= Nuragic complex of S'Arcu 'e Is Forros =

S'Arcu 'e Is Forros
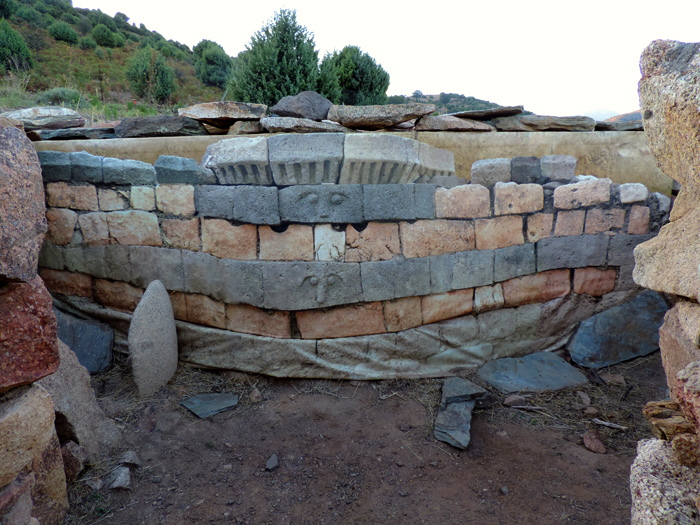
- Interactive map of S'Arcu 'e Is Forros
- Type: Village
- Periods: Bronze Age
- Cultures: Nuragic civilization
- Location: Villagrande Strisaili, Sardinia, Italy

The complex of S'Arcu 'e Is Forros is an important archaeological site located in the village of Villagrande Strisaili, in the province of Nuoro.

== Description ==
The site has lived two main constructive moments: the first included in the Middle Bronze Age and the second in the transition period between the Bronze Age and the first Iron Age.

The complex consisting of a megaron temple, about 17 meters long, surrounded by a fence called temenos, and other buildings of worship and housing, including also genuine metal casting workshops. Nearby is also present a trilobed complex nuraghe. Inside of the megaron temple an altar decorated with sculpted stylized human faces has been discovered.

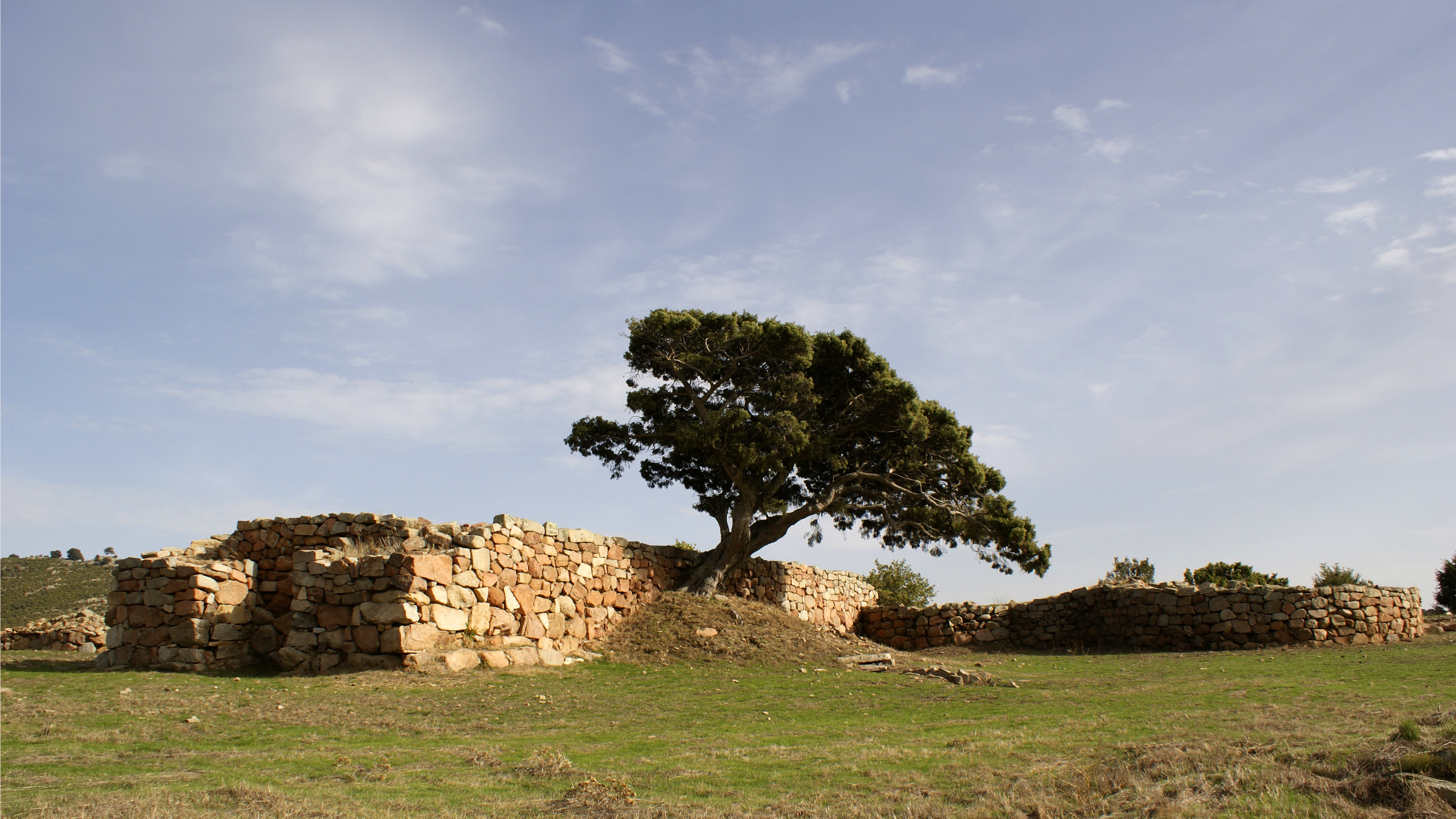
View

S'Arcu 'e Is Forros was a village-sanctuary and probably the most important metallurgical center of Nuragic Sardinia, a large trading center with Etruria and the eastern Mediterranean. Important finds have been recovered in the site such as bronze and iron objects, an Egyptian scarab and an inscribed Canaanite amphora containing what has been classified by some scholars as a Philistine inscription.
