= Gremanu =

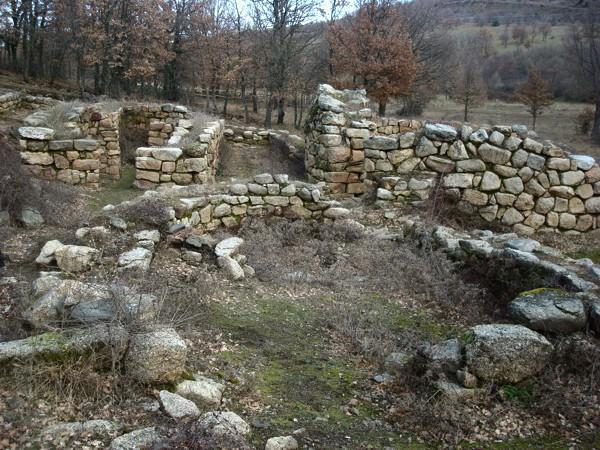
- Interactive map of Gremanu
- Type: Village
- Periods: Bronze Age
- Cultures: Nuragic civilization
- Location: Fonni, Sardinia, Italy

The nuragic sanctuary of Gremanu is a sacred nuragic area located in the territory of Fonni, in the province of Nuoro.

The site, dating back to the late Bronze Age and located at more than 1000m altitude, is made up of a stone huts village and several sacred buildings enclosed in a rectangular enclosure devoted to the cult of the waters, including a megaron temple and a particular circular temple.

The sanctuary is refurnished by an aqueduct, the only (currently known) example of a Nuragic aqueduct that served the village and the sanctuary of Germanu. The settlement covers about 7 hectares, and is divided into two parts: the first includes wells and streams, and the second has residential and religious areas.
