= Necropolis of Santu Pedru =

Archaeological site in Alghero, Italy

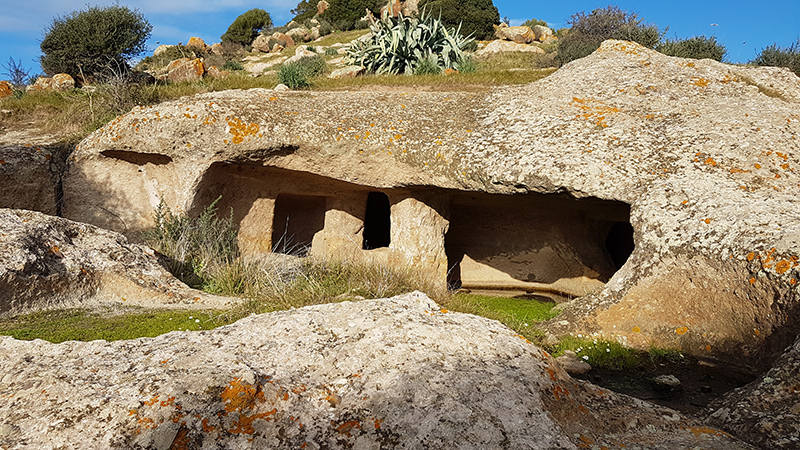
- Interactive map of Necropolis of Santu Pedru
- Type: Burial
- Periods: Neolithic, Chalcolithic, Bronze Age
- Cultures: Pre-Nuragic Sardinia
- Location: Alghero, Sardinia, Italy

The necropolis of Santu Pedru is an archaeological site of the municipality of Alghero, Sardinia.

Located near the road to Uri, the necropolis consists of 10 Domus de Janas tombs. Dating back to the pre-Nuragic period (third millennium BC), the burial site was used for about a millennium by the cultures of Ozieri, Abealzu-Filigosa, Monte Claro, Bell Beaker and Bonnanaro.

== Gallery ==
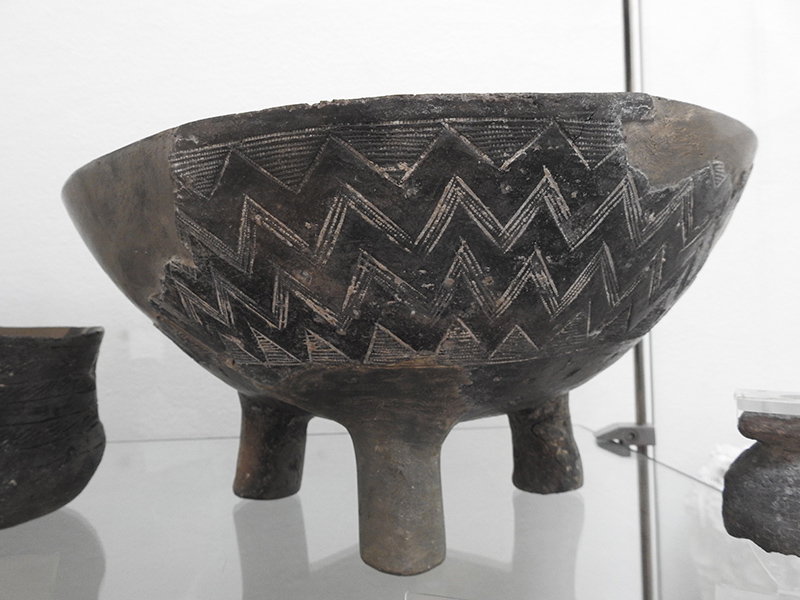
Tripod footed bowl, Bell Beaker culture

== Bibliography ==
- E. Contu, Necropoli ipogeica di Santu Pedru (Alghero-Sassari), in Sardegna, a cura di A. Moravetti, collana "Guide archeologiche", 2, Forlì, A.B.A.C.O., 1995, pp. 19–25;
- A. Moravetti.-V. Mazzarello-P. Bandiera, The necropolis of hypogea in Santu Pedru (Alghero-Sassari). New Data, in Sardinia. Papers of the EAA Third Annual Meeting at Ravenna 1997, 3, collana "BAR, international series", 719, Oxford, Archaeopress, 1998, pp. 7–19;
- Contu, 1964 = E. Contu, La tomba dei vasi tetrapodi in località Santu Pedru (Alghero-Sassari), in Monumenti Antichi dei Lincei, Roma, XLVII, 1964, coll. 1-196
- E. Contu, Alghero. La tomba dei vasi tetrapodi, in località S. Pedru, in I Sardi. La Sardegna dal paleolitico all'età romana, Milano, Jaca Book, 1984, pp. 223–224
- A. Moravetti, La tomba II della necropoli ipogeica di S. Pedru (Alghero-Sassari), in Sardinia Antiqua. Studi in onore di Piero Meloni, Cagliari, Edizioni della Torre, 1992, pp. 97–122
- Moravetti, 1996 = A. Moravetti, Necropoli ipogeica di Santu Pedru (Alghero-Sassari), in Sardegna, collana "Preistoria e Protostoria Guide archeologiche", 2, Forlì, A.B.A.C.O., 1996, pp. 19–25
- A. Moravetti, Nuovi scavi nella necropoli ipogeica di Santu Pedru (Alghero-Sassari). La Tomba VII, in Multas per gentes. Studi in onore di Enzo Cadoni, Sassari, EDES, 2000, pp. 251–278
- Melis, 2009 = Paolo Melis, Lo scavo della Tomba X nella necropoli ipogeica di Santu Pedru (Alghero - Sassari) : una domus de janas delle prime fasi del Neolitico Recente, in “Rivista di scienze preistoriche”, Vol. 59 (2009), pp. 93-114
- Demartis, 1998 = Museo nazionale archeologico "G. A. Sanna" Sassari, Demartis, Giovanni Maria; Necropoli di Santu Pedru : Alghero / Giovanni M. Demartis, Viterbo, BetaGamma, 1998
