= Domus de Janas Sos Furrighesos =

Coordinates: 40.4816°N 8.972°E

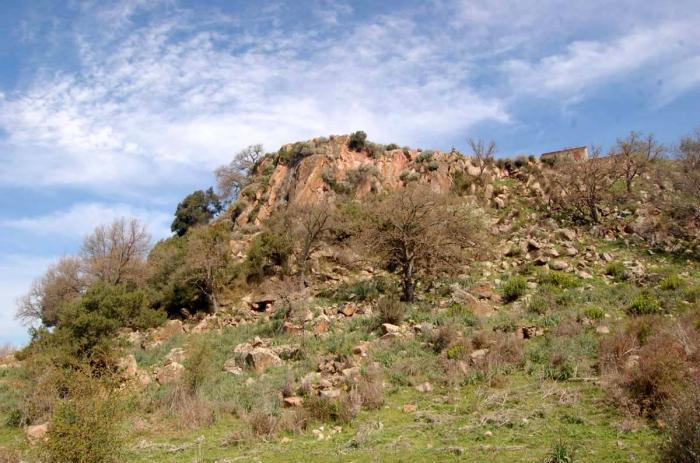
- Necropolis Sos Furrighesos
- Interactive map of Domus de Janas Sos Furrighesos
- Type: Burial
- Periods: Neolithic, Chalcolithic, Bronze Age
- Cultures: Pre-Nuragic Sardinia
- Location: Anela, Sardinia, Italy

UNESCO World Heritage Site
- Part of: Funerary Tradition in the Prehistory of Sardinia – The domus de janas
- Criteria: Cultural: iii
- Reference: 1730-017
- Inscription: 2025 (47th Session)

The Domus de Janas Sos Furrighesos is an archaeological site located in the municipality of Anela, Sardinia.

It is a necropolis dug into the rock of the ridge of the volcanic plateau of Pianu Oschiri, which overlooks the Tuvu 'e carru stream.

== Description ==
The necropolis consists of 18 domus de janas, dug on three overlapping horizontal levels, for a maximum height of 3 m above ground level. Based on the materials found during the excavations, the burials have been dated to a period between the late Neolithic (San Michele culture, 3200-2800 BC) and the early Bronze Age (Bonnanaro culture, 1800-1600 BC). The tombs were accessible thanks to notches carved into the rocks, an accurate system of channels conveyed rainwater and infiltration water downwards and to the sides of the tomb doors, preserving decorations, bodies and funeral furnishings from humidity and decay. The entrances were closed with wooden or stone doors.

Tomb IX, also called sa tumba de su re (the king's tomb), consists of a single cell. The entrance door is highlighted by a stele (4.05 m high, 4.02 m wide) sculpted in relief and divided by a horizontal strip shaped like a trapezium into two sections: the upper one is a lunette and the lower one is a trapezium. The band that surrounds the stele laterally and above has the same relief. The stele was sculpted in times following the excavation of the hypogeum (1600-1800 BC) during the Archaic Nuragic period. Above this architectural party, on a flat stretch there are three recesses containing three baetyl pillars held in place by rock chips and oblong pebbles arranged in a knife-edge pattern. The cell has a rectangular plan (4.05 x 2.20 x 1.65 m), the ceiling and walls are decorated with engravings. The latter were made with different techniques: with hammer, linear, with polissoir and with dotted lines, from the Roman era or early medieval era. The hammer carvings date back to different eras from the Abealzu-Filigosa culture to the Bronze Age.

== Gallery ==
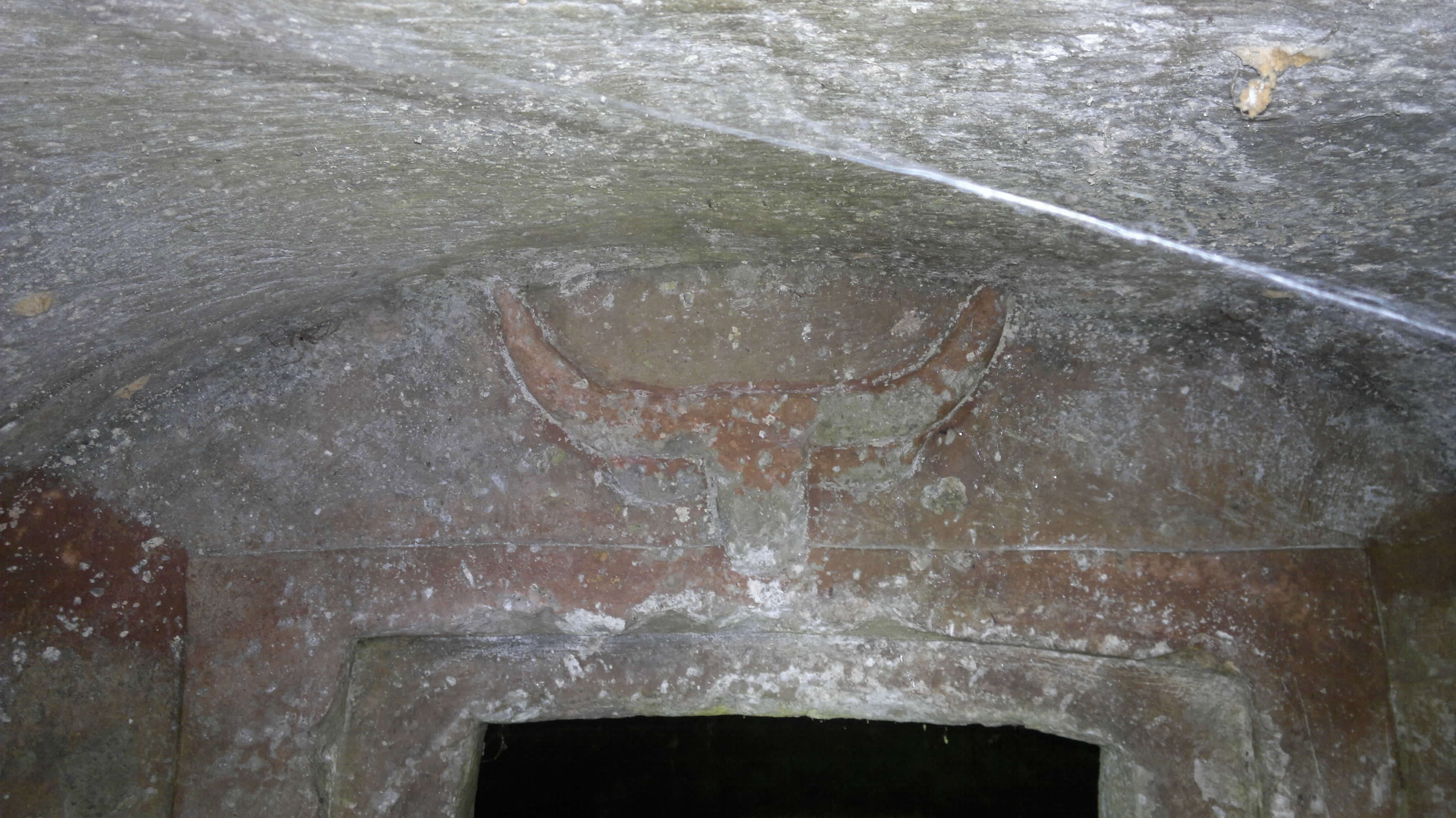
Protome taurina

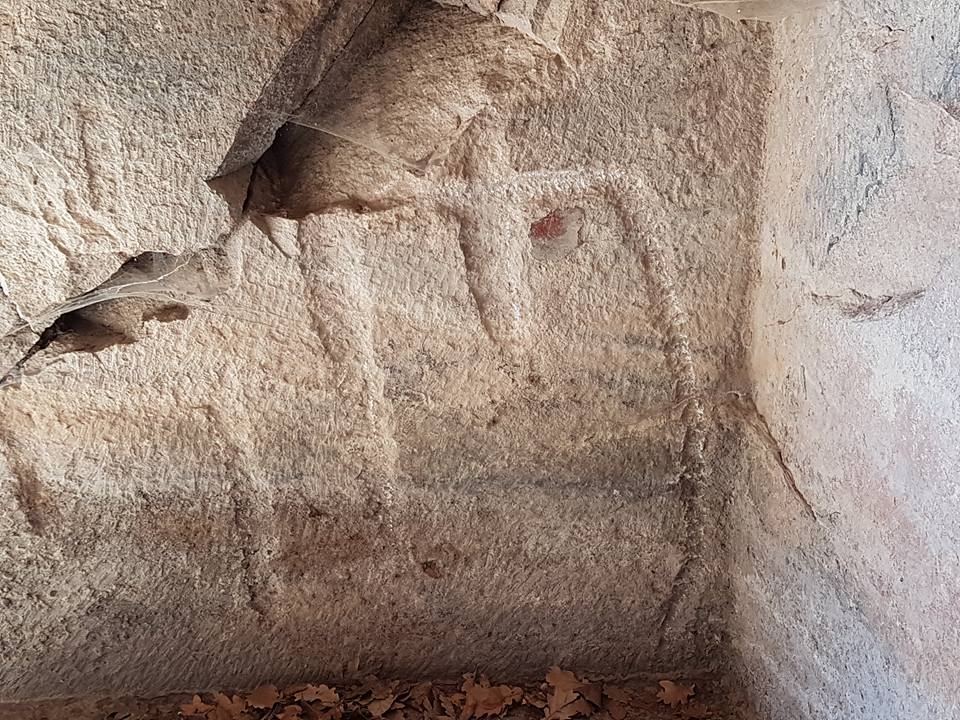
Petroglyph

== Bibliography ==
- Joseph Tanda – Art and religion of prehistoric Sardinia in the necropolis of Sos Furrighesos – Anela (SS) – Chiarella Publishing 1984;
- Giuseppa Tanda, Massimo Vanzi, Carla Mannu, Riccardo Dessì – Prehistoric art in Sardinia. Methods, techniques, results – University of Cagliari 2014;
- Alberto Moravetti, Paolo Melis, Lavinia Foddai and Elisabetta Alba – Prehistoric Sardinia – Autonomous Region of Sardinia 2017.
