= Necropolis of Montessu =

Archeological site in Villaperuccio, Sardinia, Italy

Coordinates: 39.1333°N 8.6686°E

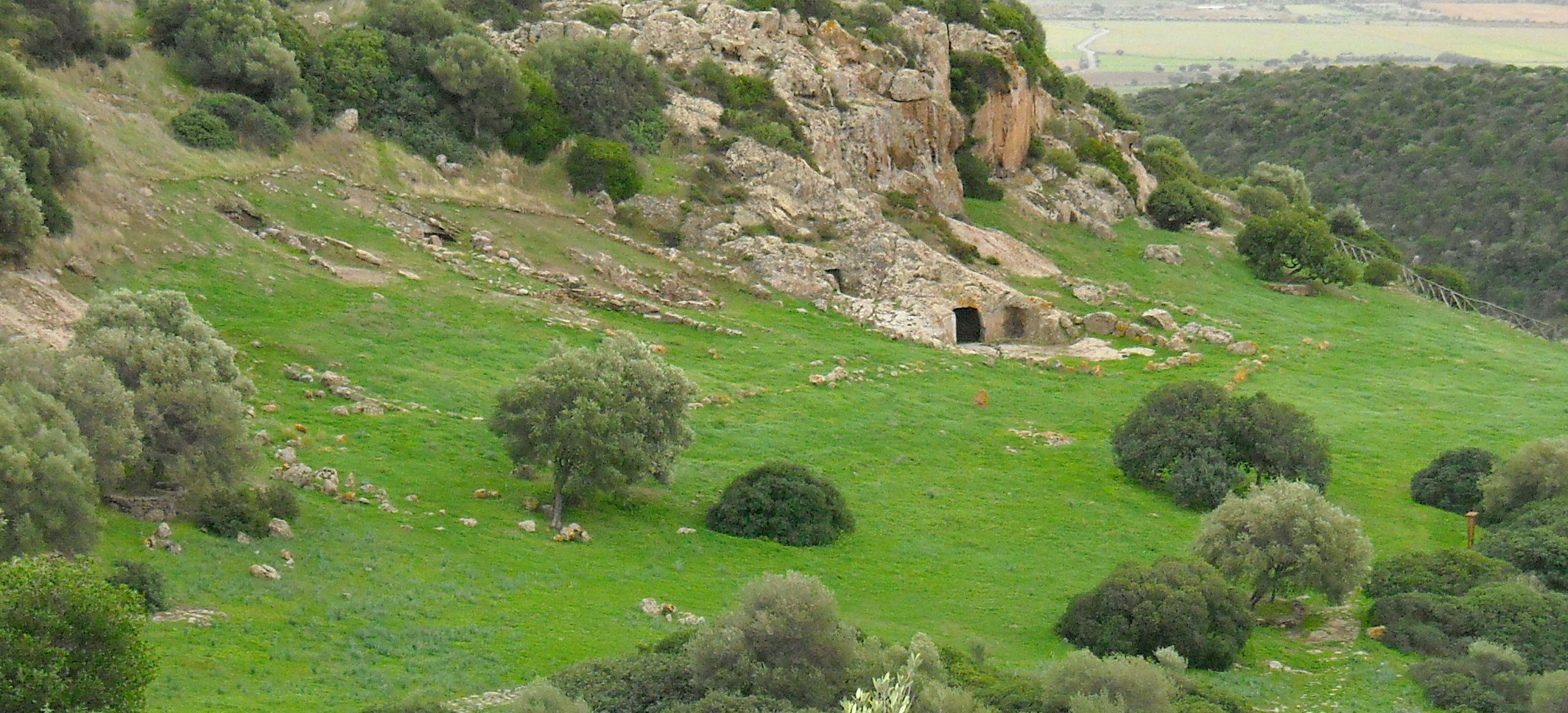
- Interactive map of Necropolis of Montessu
- Type: Burial
- Periods: Neolithic, Chalcolithic, Bronze Age
- Cultures: Pre-Nuragic Sardinia
- Location: Villaperuccio, Sardinia, Italy

UNESCO World Heritage Site
- Part of: Funerary Tradition in the Prehistory of Sardinia – The domus de janas
- Criteria: Cultural: iii
- Reference: 1730-027
- Inscription: 2025 (47th Session)

The necropolis of Montessu is an archaeological site located in the municipality of Villaperuccio, Sardinia.

The necropolis is located on the southern flanks of the hill of Sa Pranedda, a few kilometers north of Villaperuccio. Set within a large natural amphitheater, it has about forty domus de janas and is considered one of the largest and most important archaeological site of Sardinia.

Dating back to pre-Nuragic period (third millennium BC), this burial site was used for about a millennium during which alternated the cultures of Ozieri, Abealzu-Filigosa, Monte Claro, Bell Beaker and Bonnanaro.

Some domus de janas feature engraved patterns in relief such as spirals, concentric symbols and bull horns.

== Bibliography ==
- Enrico Atzeni, "Montessu (Santadi)", in Rivista di Scienze preistoriche, XXVII, 1972, p. 477 ss.;
- M. Frau-R. Monticolo, Sulcis: guida archeologica: Calasetta, Carbonia, Carloforte, Giba, Masainas, Narcao, Nuxis, Perdaxius, Piscinas, Portoscuso, S. Giovanni Suergiu, S. Anna Arresi, Santadi, S. Antioco, Teulada, Tratalias, Villaperuccio, Firenze, Arte e Natura,1990, pp. 34–36.
