= Necropolis of Anghelu Ruju =

Archaeological site in Alghero, Italy

Coordinates: 40.6325°N 8.3267°E

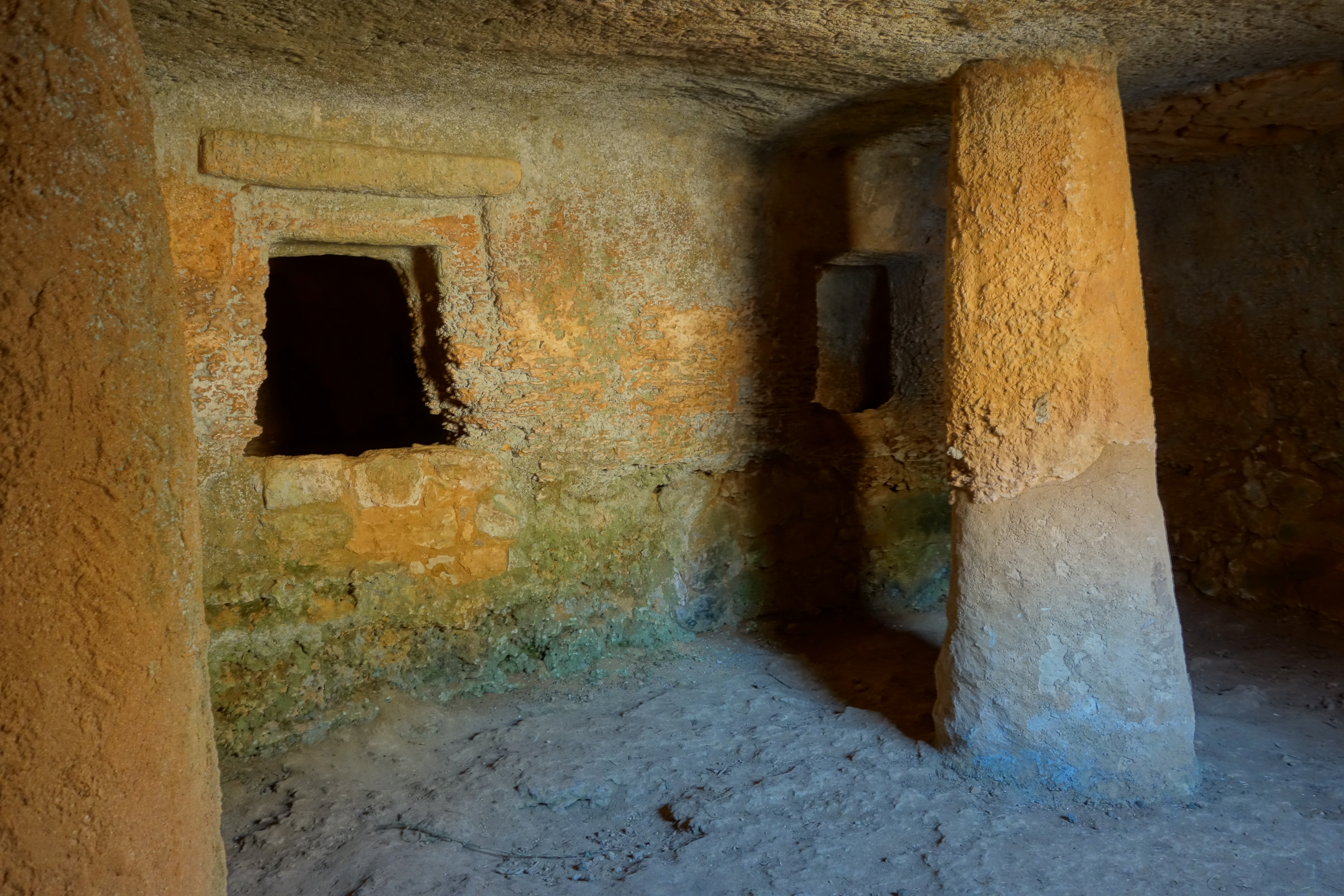
- Entrance of one of domus de janas
- Interactive map of Necropolis of Anghelu Ruju
- Type: Burial
- Periods: Neolithic, Chalcolithic, Bronze Age
- Cultures: Pre-Nuragic Sardinia
- Location: Alghero, Sardinia, Italy

UNESCO World Heritage Site
- Part of: Funerary Tradition in the Prehistory of Sardinia – The domus de janas
- Criteria: Cultural: iii
- Reference: 1730-001
- Inscription: 2025 (47th Session)

The necropolis of Anghelu Ruju is a pre-Nuragic archaeological site located north of the city of Alghero, Province of Sassari, Sardinia. It is the largest necropolis of pre-Nuragic Sardinia.

The necropolis was discovered accidentally in 1903 during the excavations for the construction of a farmhouse, in the winery of Sella&Mosca. A human skull and a tripod vessel were found on that occasion. Following these findings, the archaeologist Antonio Taramelli carried out, the following year, the first excavations of the site discovering ten domus de janas. Later 21 others came to light and further research works led to 38 domus discovered.

Within the many chambers are numerous finds of grave goods (vases, statuettes of the hypothesized "mother goddess", weapons, necklace beads etc.), which allow us to date the necropolis to the Late Neolithic (Ozieri culture 3200-2800 BC) and they prove its use even in the Copper and the early Bronze Age, between 2800 and 1600 BC, (cultures of Abealzu-Filigosa, Monte Claro, Bell Beaker, Bonnanaro). Furthermore, finds of flint tools, mace-heads, arrowheads, axes and beads suggest a culture which emphasized hunting and warrior prowess; whereas silver rings, copper daggers appearing to originate from Spain, an awl which likely was from southern France, a copper ring of an eastern European style, and an axe which was from the British Isles indicate that Sardinia was heavily involved in this time period with a great deal of international trade. The Sardinians, for their part, were known to possess an ample amount of valuable obsidian from Monte Arci, a long-dormant volcano on the island.

Among the most striking features of the Necropolis are the numerous carvings of long-horned bulls' heads, in and around at least three of the tombs. These have been hypothesized to support the "Mother Goddess" theory, as well as to suggest a sort of a Sun cult.

== Gallery ==
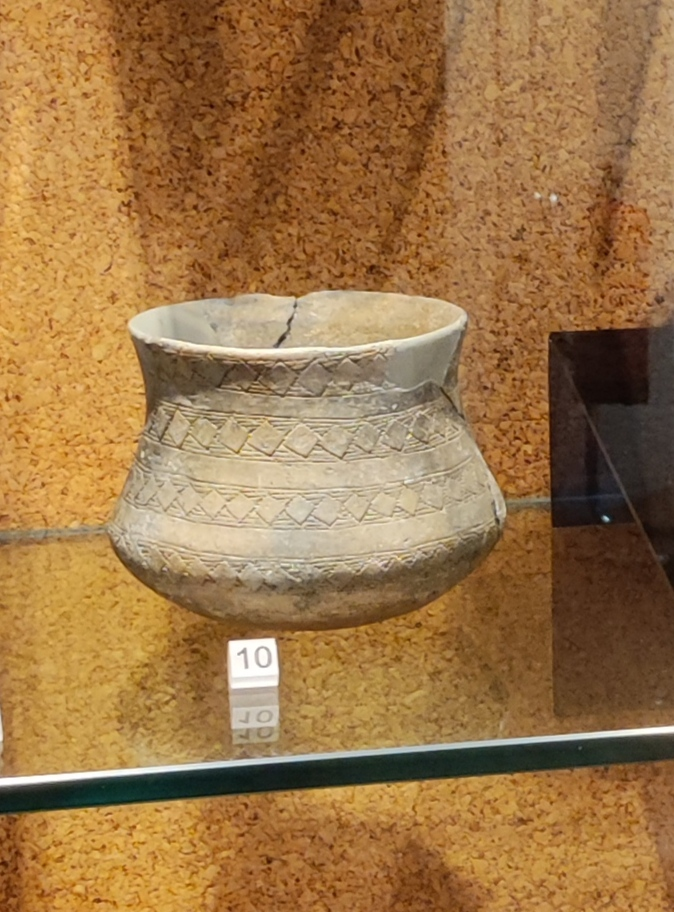
Ceramic vessel, Bell Beaker culture

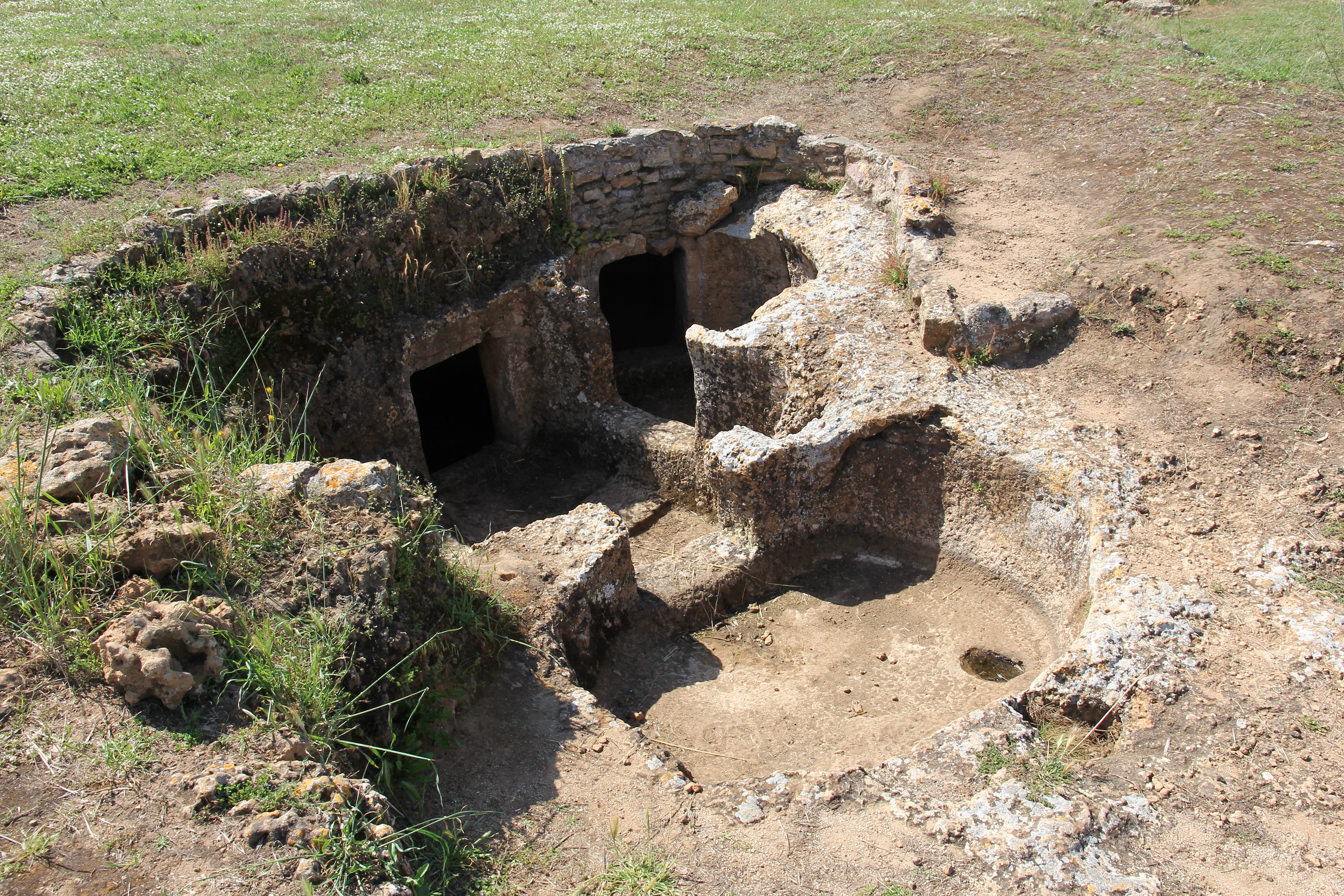
One of the several tombs

== Bibliography ==
- A. Taramelli, Scavi nella necropoli a grotte artificiali di Anghelu Ruju, in Notizie degli Scavi di Antichità, 1904, pp. 301–351;
- A. Taramelli, Alghero: nuovi scavi nella necropoli preistorica di Anghelu Ruju, in Monumenti Antichi dei Lincei, XIX, 1909, coll. 397–540;
- D. Levi, La necropoli di Angelu Ruju e la civiltà eneolitica della Sardegna, in Studi Sardi, X-XI, 1952, pp. 5–51;
- J. Audibert, Préhistoire de la Sardaigne-Résultats de mission archéologique, in Bulletin di Museé d'Anthropologie préhistorique de Monaco, 5, 1958, pp. 189–246;
- E. Contu, Notiziario Sardegna, in Rivista di Scienze Preistoriche, 1968, pp. 421–430;
