= Antonio Taramelli =

Italian archaeologist (1868–1939)

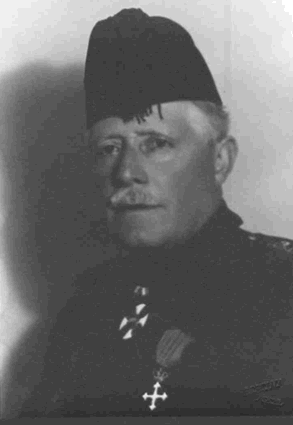
Antonio Taramelli

Antonio Taramelli (Udine, November 14, 1868 - Rome, May 7, 1939) was an Italian archaeologist.

== Biography ==
He was the son of the geologist Torquato Taramelli, and he is best known for his research in Sardinia. After graduating in literature at the University of Pavia and in archeology at the National School of Archeology, he began his career in the field of the archaeological research and the protection and preservation of the cultural heritage. He became interested in the Punic site of Sant'Avendrace (Cagliari), Sulci, Cornus and Bithia, the Nuragic sites at Santa Vittoria, Paulilatino, Abbasanta, Sarroch, the necropolis of Anghelu Ruju (Alghero) and that of Sant'Andrea Priu (Bonorva). His research were crucial for the knowledge of Sardinian nuragic and prenuragic funerary rites. He also promoted the restoration of various medieval monuments of the Island.

Among the positions he got there was the direction of the Museo archeologico nazionale di Cagliari (National Archaeological Museum of Cagliari) and the direction of the archaeological excavations in the territory of the city. His area of expertise came to include the entire region when it became "Sovrintendente di I classe agli scavi e musei archeologici della Sardegna". It was also active in the academic world: he devoted himself to teaching in the University of Cagliari occupying the chair of archeology as a lecturer. He was welcomed as a member of the Accademia dei Lincei, a great recognition came to him even when he was appointed a senator of the Kingdom of Italy in 1934.
