= Domus de Janas =

Type of chamber tomb found in Sardinia, Italy

Funerary Tradition in the Prehistory of Sardinia – The domus de janas
UNESCO World Heritage Site
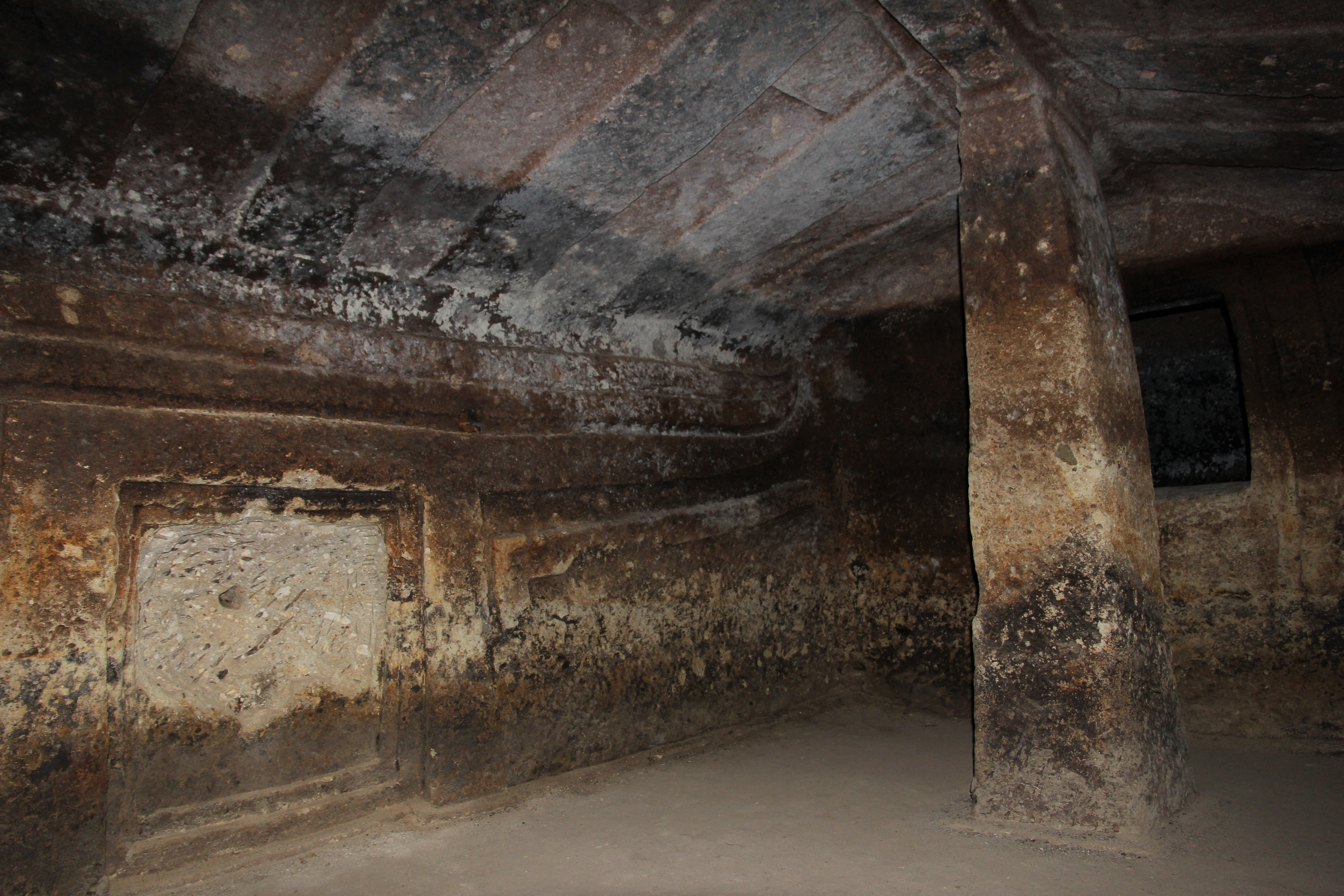
- Necropolis of Monte Siseri, Putifigari

- Location within Italy
- Location: Sardinia, Italy
- Criteria: iii
- Reference: 1730
- Inscription: 2025 (47th Session)
- Coordinates: 40.085°N 8.951°E

Domus de Janas (Sardinian for 'House of the Fairies' or, alternatively, 'House of Witches') are a type of pre-Nuragic rock-cut chamber tomb found in Sardinia. They consist of several chambers quarried out by the people of the San Ciriaco through Ozieri cultures and subsequent cultures, resembling houses in their layout.

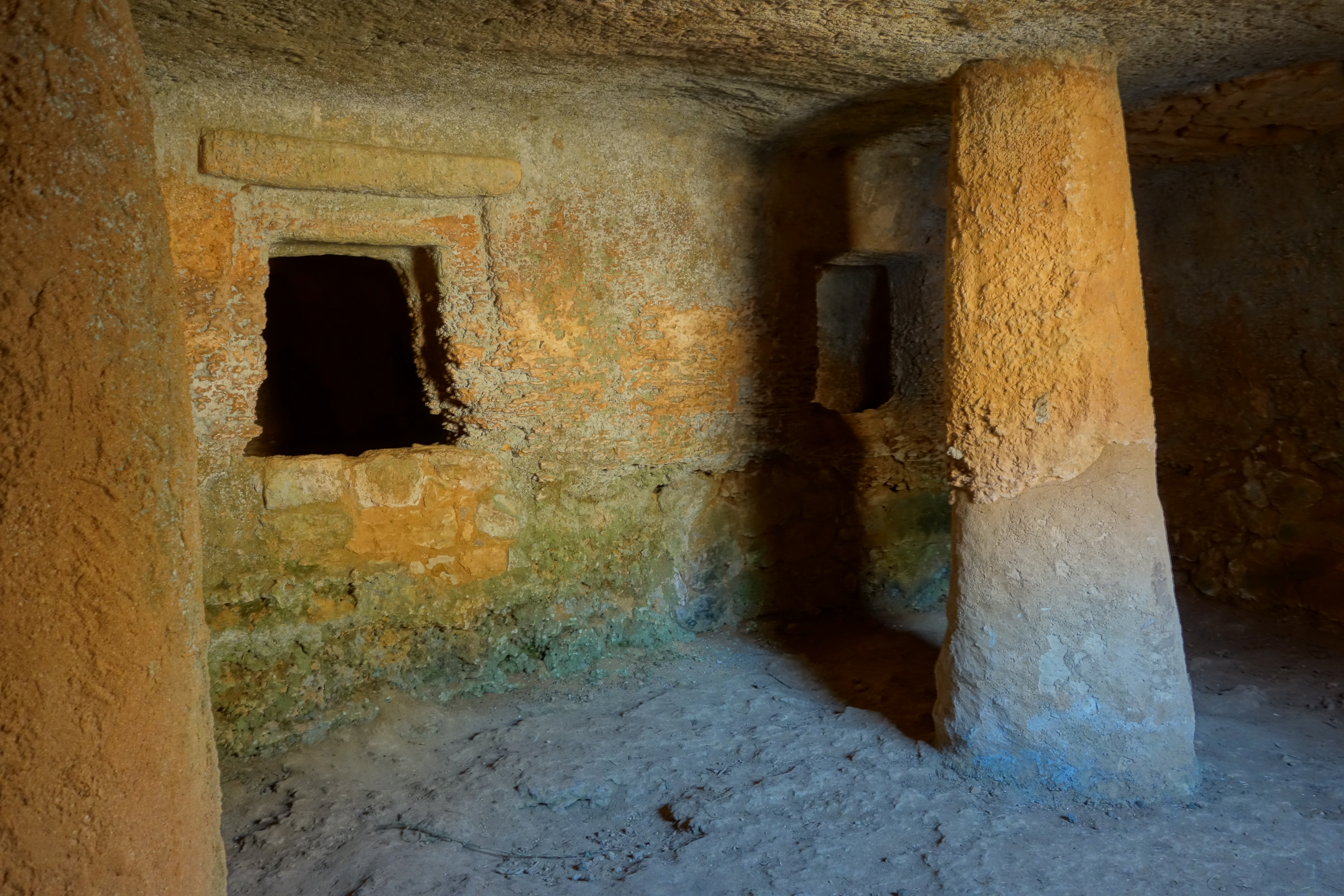
Domus de Janas, Necropolis of Anghelu Ruju

Built mostly between 3400 and 2700 BC, they date to the late Neolithic, Chalcolithic and early Bronze Age, including the Bell Beaker period. A necropolis of them at the site of Anghelu Ruju, near Alghero, consists of 38 tombs. Other large sites are those of Montessu, near Villaperuccio, and of Sant'Andrea Priu at Bonorva. Many other domus de janas can be found throughout the island, with the exception of Gallura (where the deceased were usually buried in megalithic circles, such as that those of Li Muri).

The shape of the internal chambers can vary from that of a rounded hut with conical or triangular ceiling. The walls are often decorated with reliefs or etchings depicting magical and religious symbols such as spirals, zig-zag motifs and bull's horns. It was discovered that these neolithic murals are arguably the oldest known examples of egg tempera murals.

Carved or painted false doors appear in about 20 tombs mostly located in northwestern Sardinia, an example being some of the tombs of the necropolis of Anghelu Ruju, which are variously datable from the Ozieri to the Bonnanaro cultures (c.3200 – 1600 BCE). The earliest examples predate the appearance of false doors in Ancient Egyptian tombs. These false doors usually appear on the back wall of the main chamber, and are represented by horizontal and vertical frames and a projecting lintel. Sometimes the door is topped with painted or carved U-shaped bull horns, inscribed inside each other in a variable number.

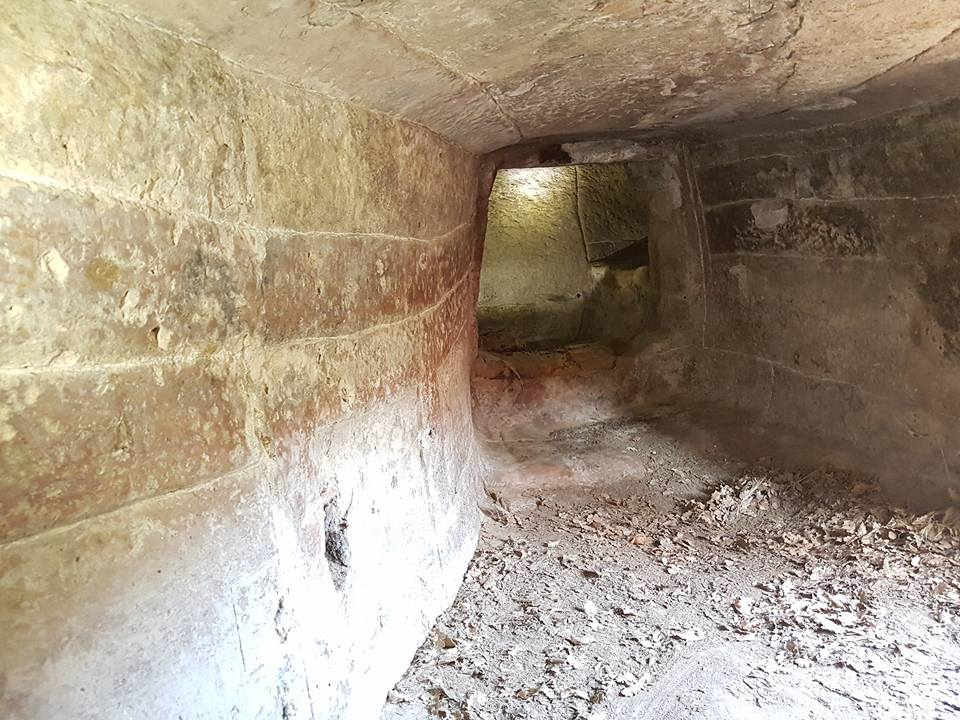
Domus de Janas Sos Furrighesos, Anela

The corpses, painted with red ochre like the tomb's walls, were buried together with common life objects, jewels and tools. According to archaeologist Giovanni Lilliu, they were buried under shells of molluscs; according to other theories, they were left outside the tomb, being put inside only after they had reduced to a skeleton.

In 2021, the Domus de Janas were nominated for the World Heritage List. In July 2025, they were inscribed as a UNESCO World Heritage Site under the listing "Funerary Tradition in the Prehistory of Sardinia – The domus de janas".

== Gallery ==
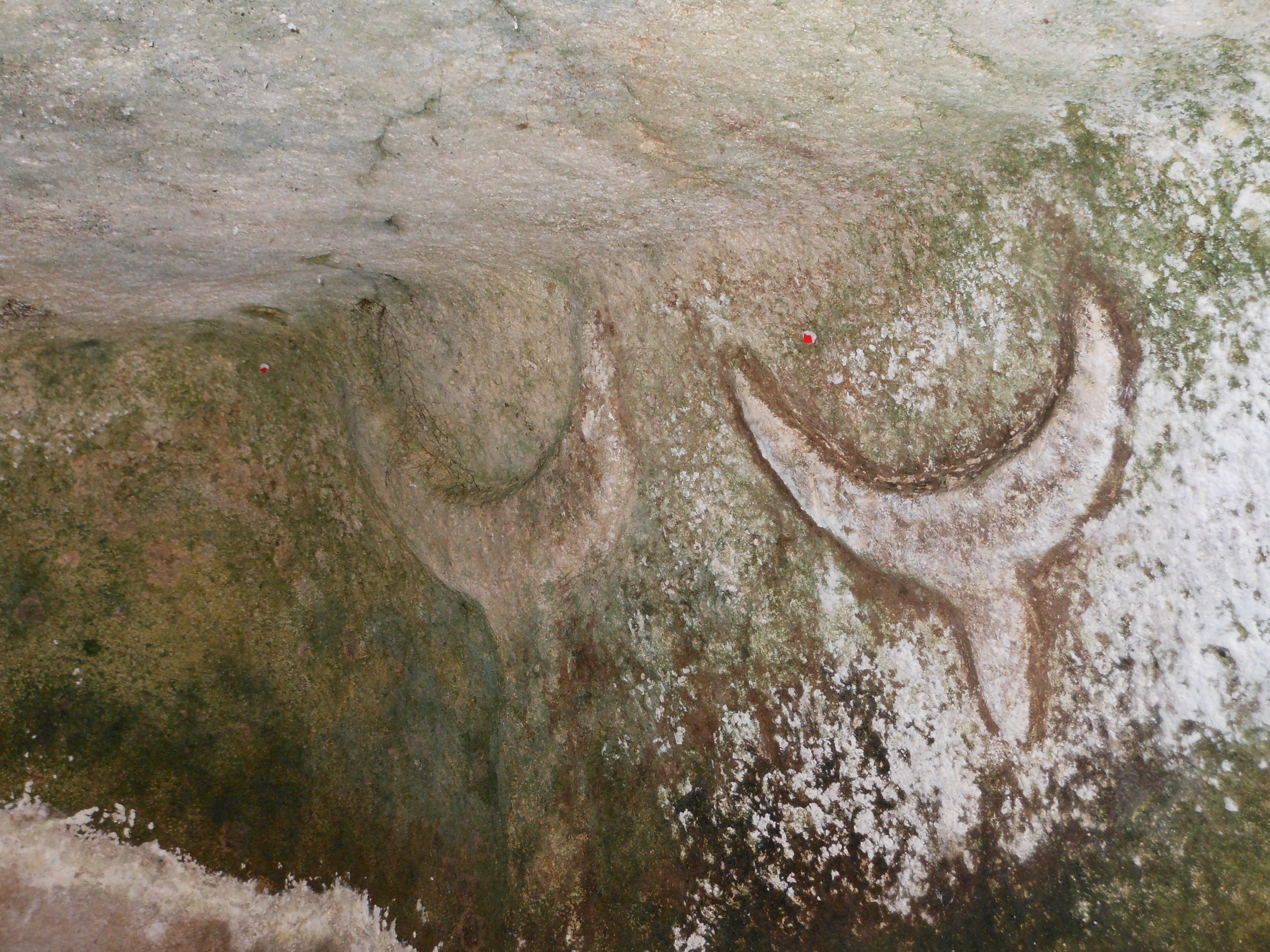
Bull's horns, necropolis of Su Crucifissu Mannu, Porto Torres

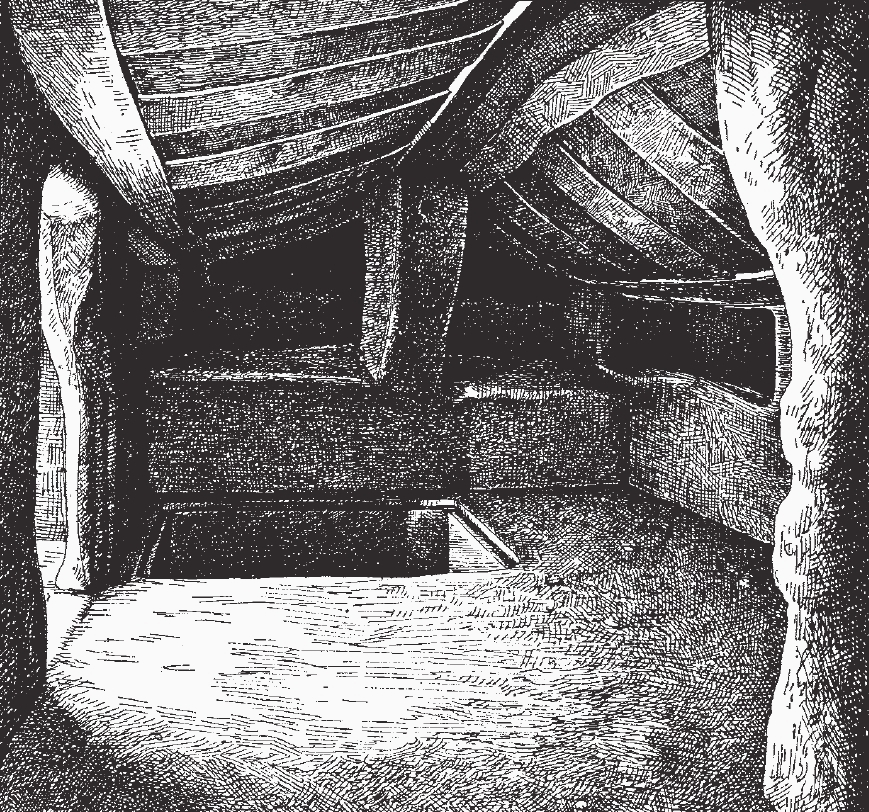
Interior of one of the Domus de Janas of Sant'Andrea Priu, Bonorva.

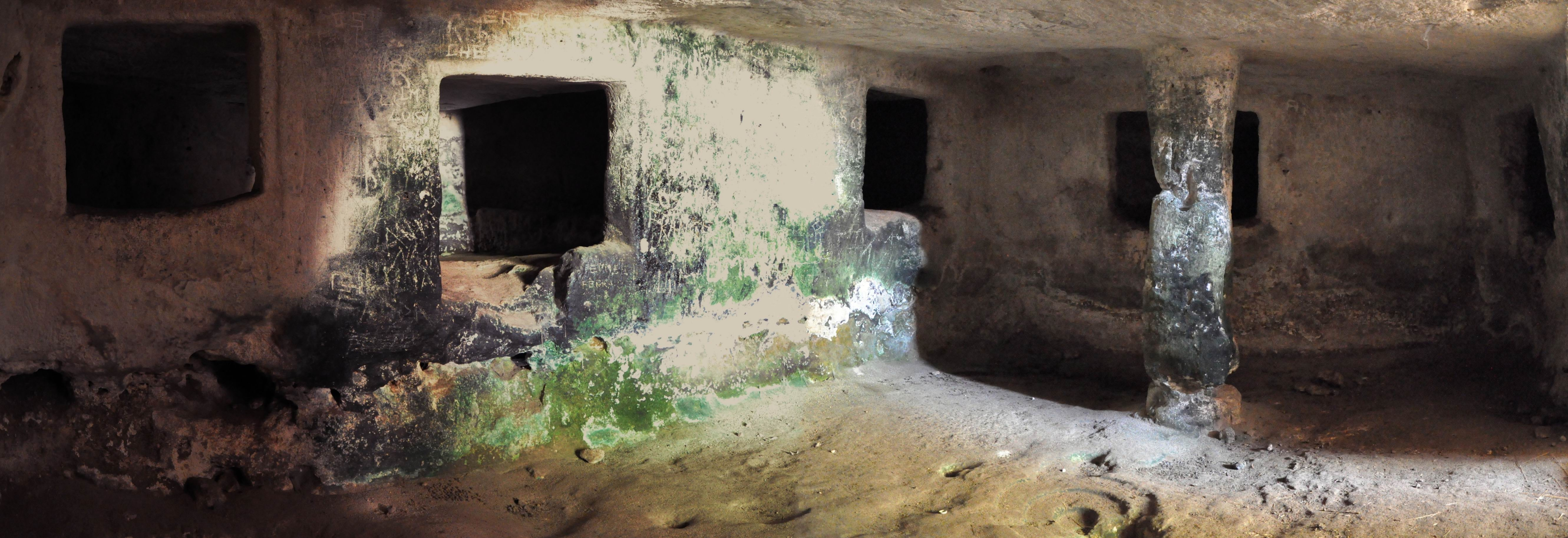
Domus de Janas of S'Elighe Entosu.

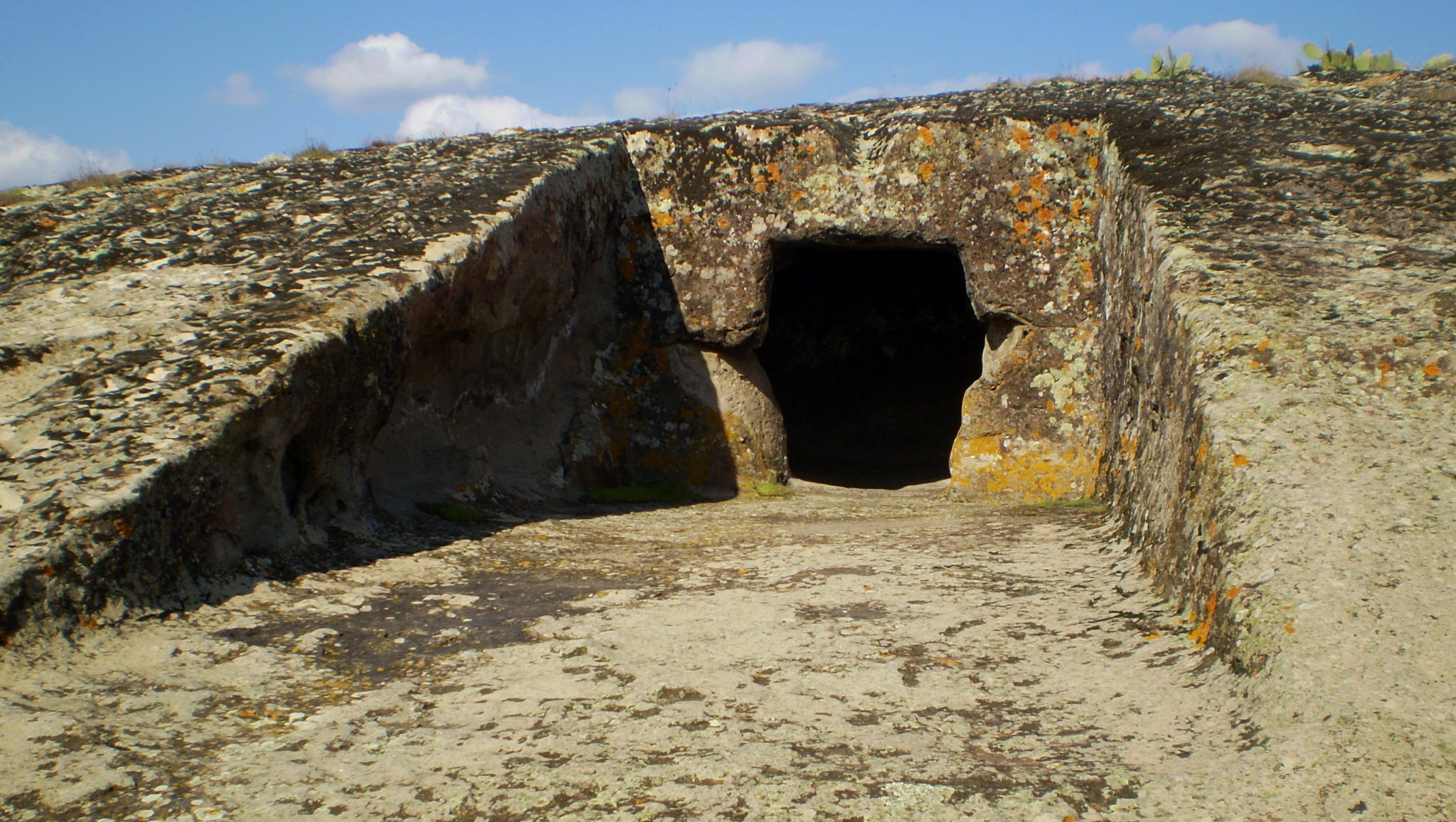
Entrance of the domus de janas of Genna Salixi, Ruinas

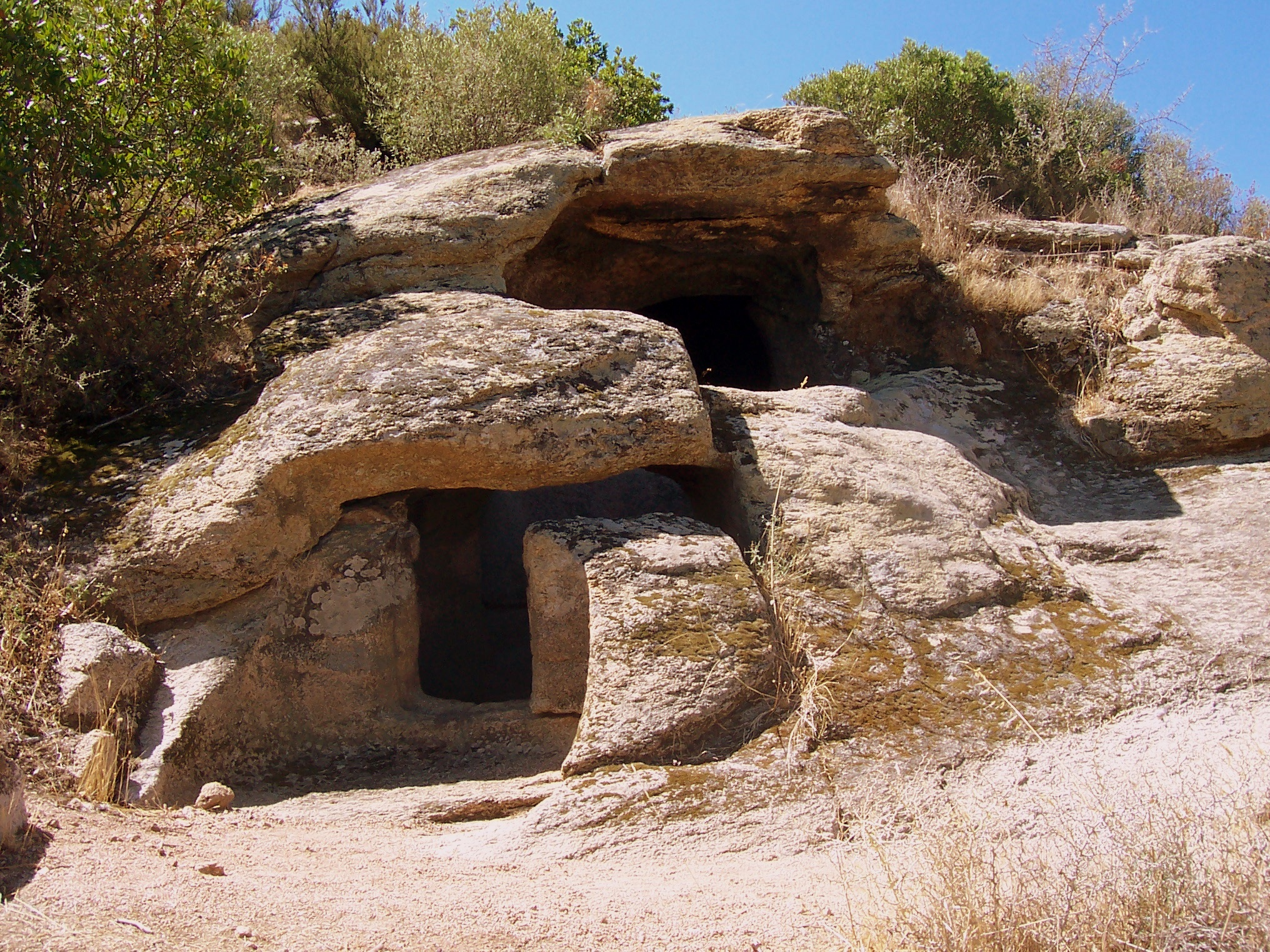
Domus de Janas in Lotzorai

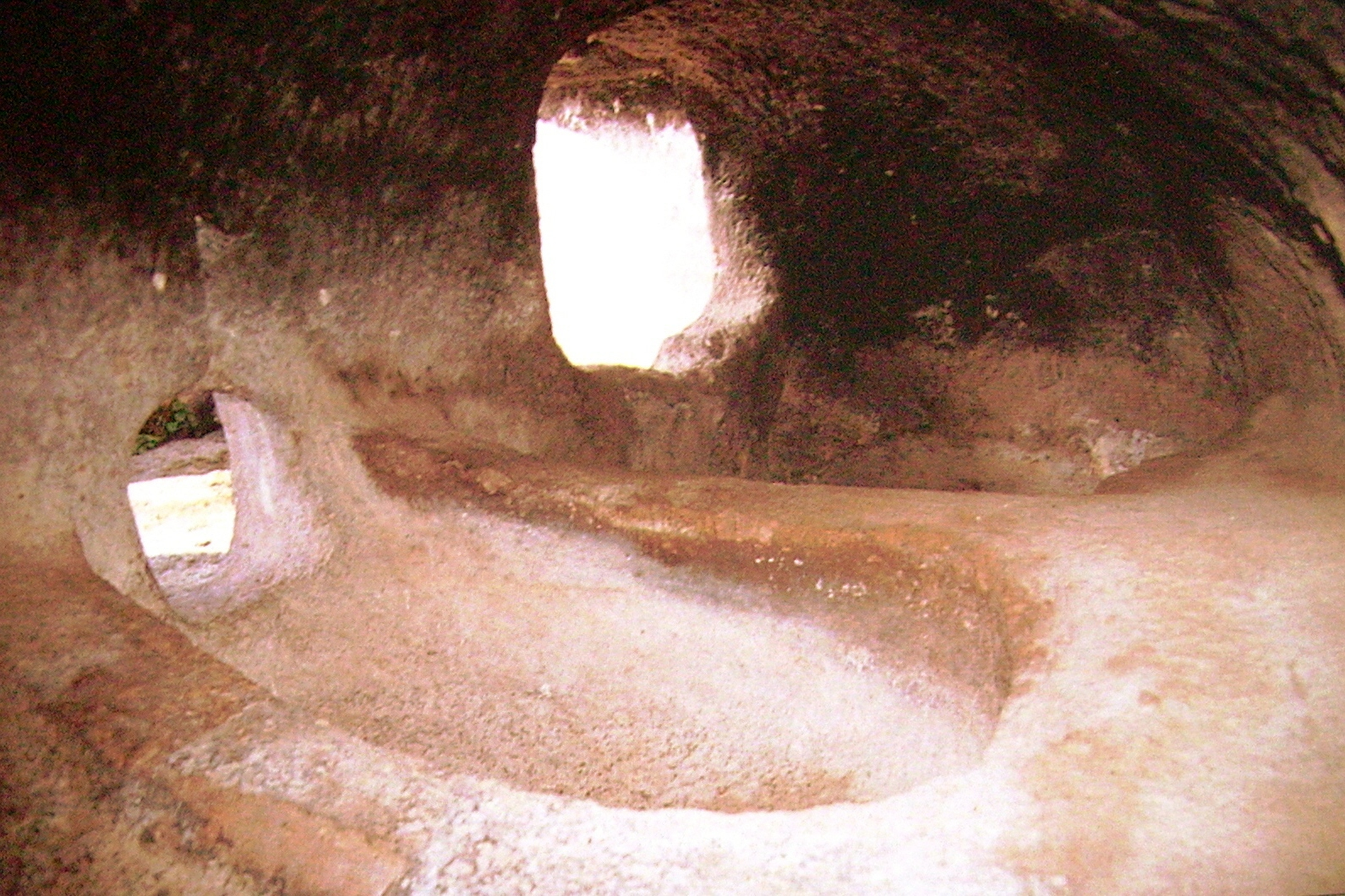
Interior of a Domus de Janas

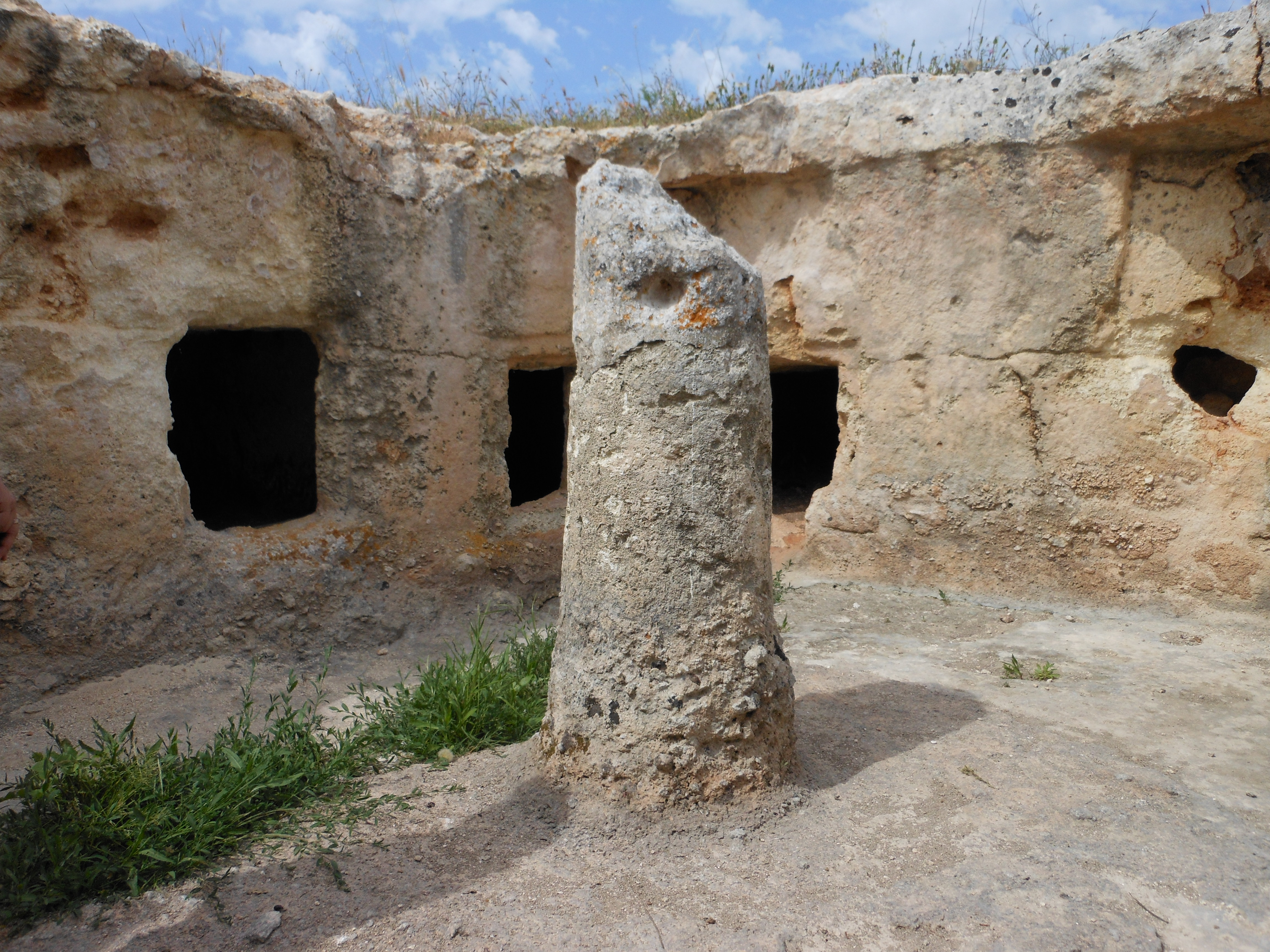
Su Crucifissu Mannu

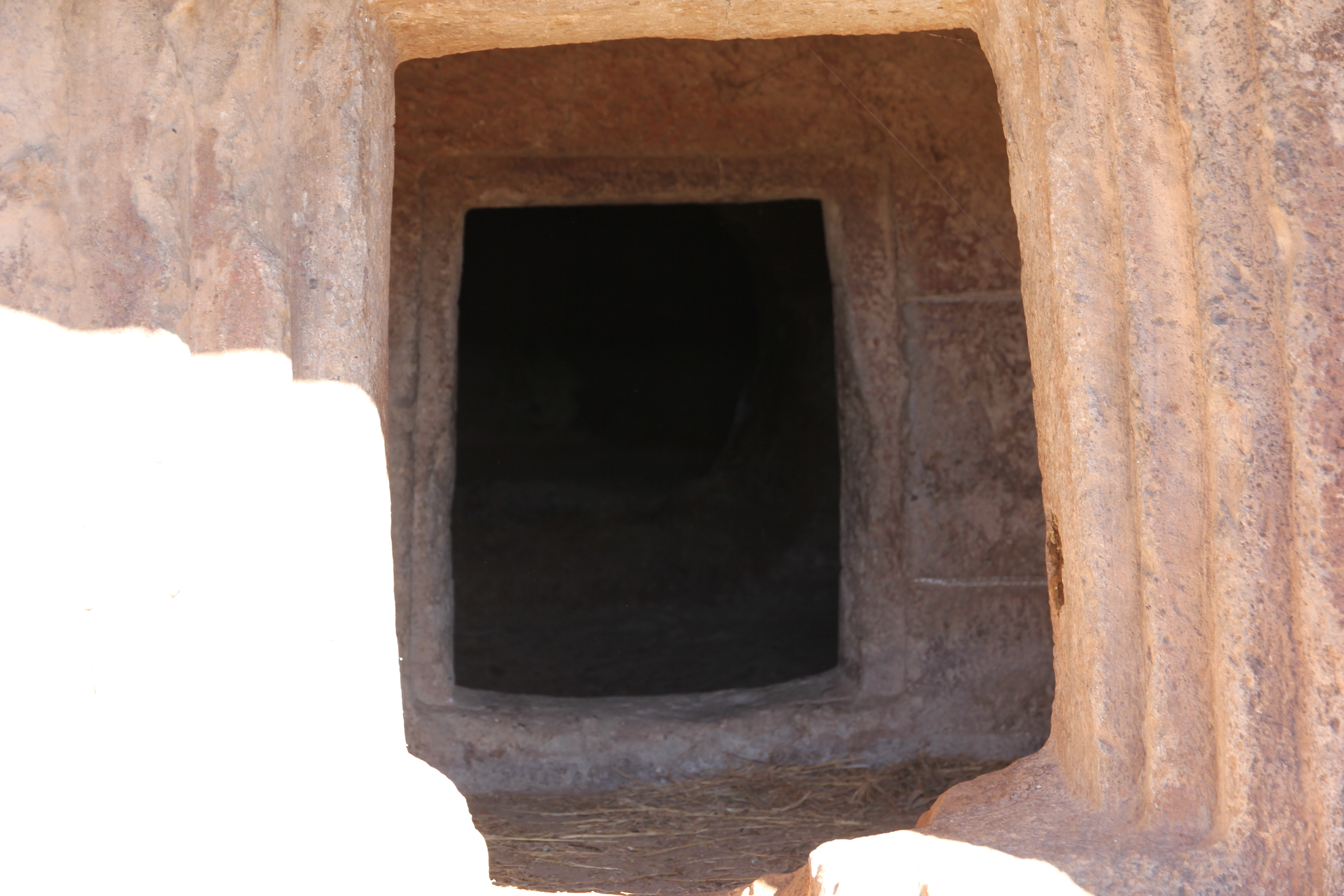
Necropolis of Arzolas de Goi, Nughedu Santa Vittoria

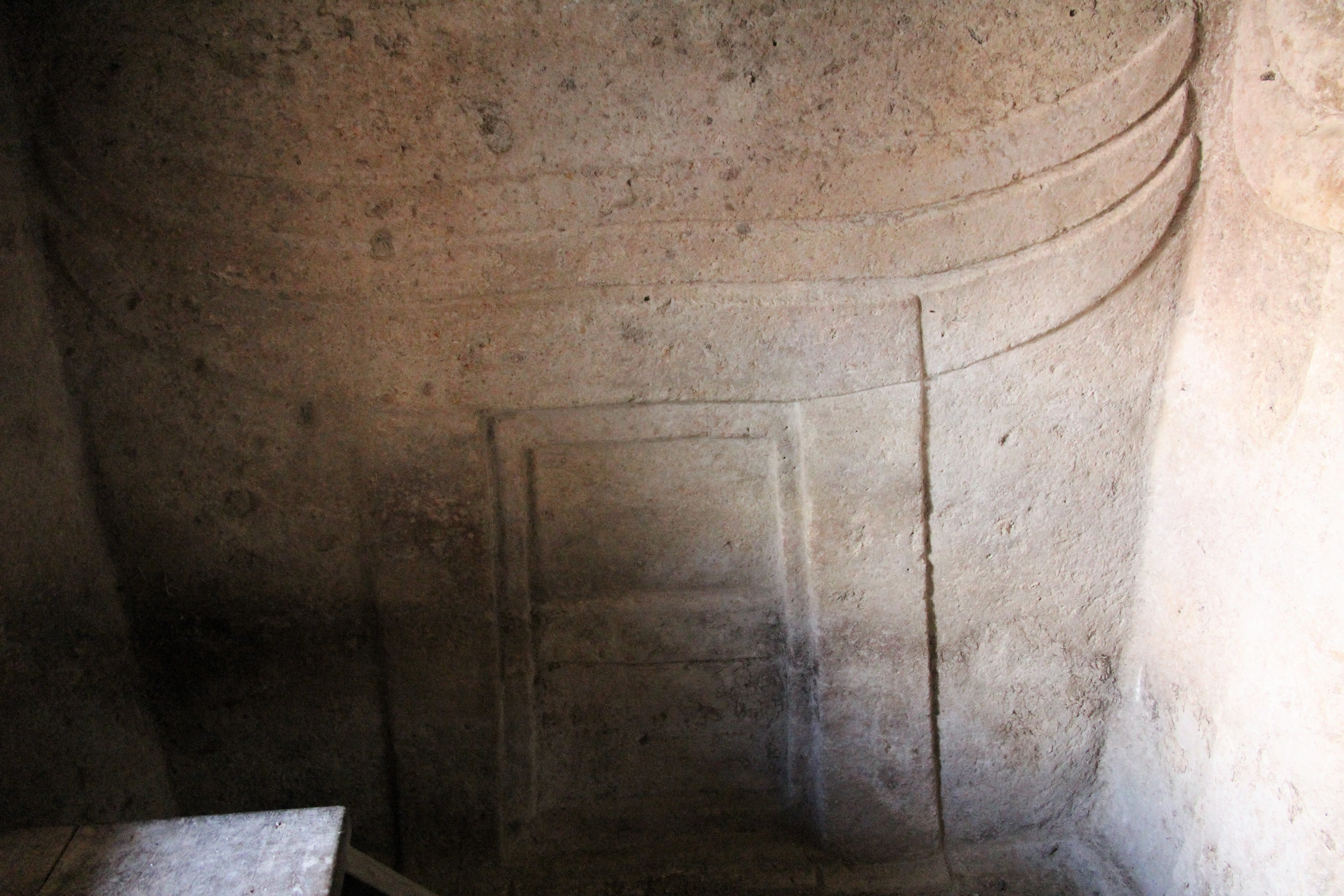
Pre-Nuragic false door topped with bull horns, from Putifigari

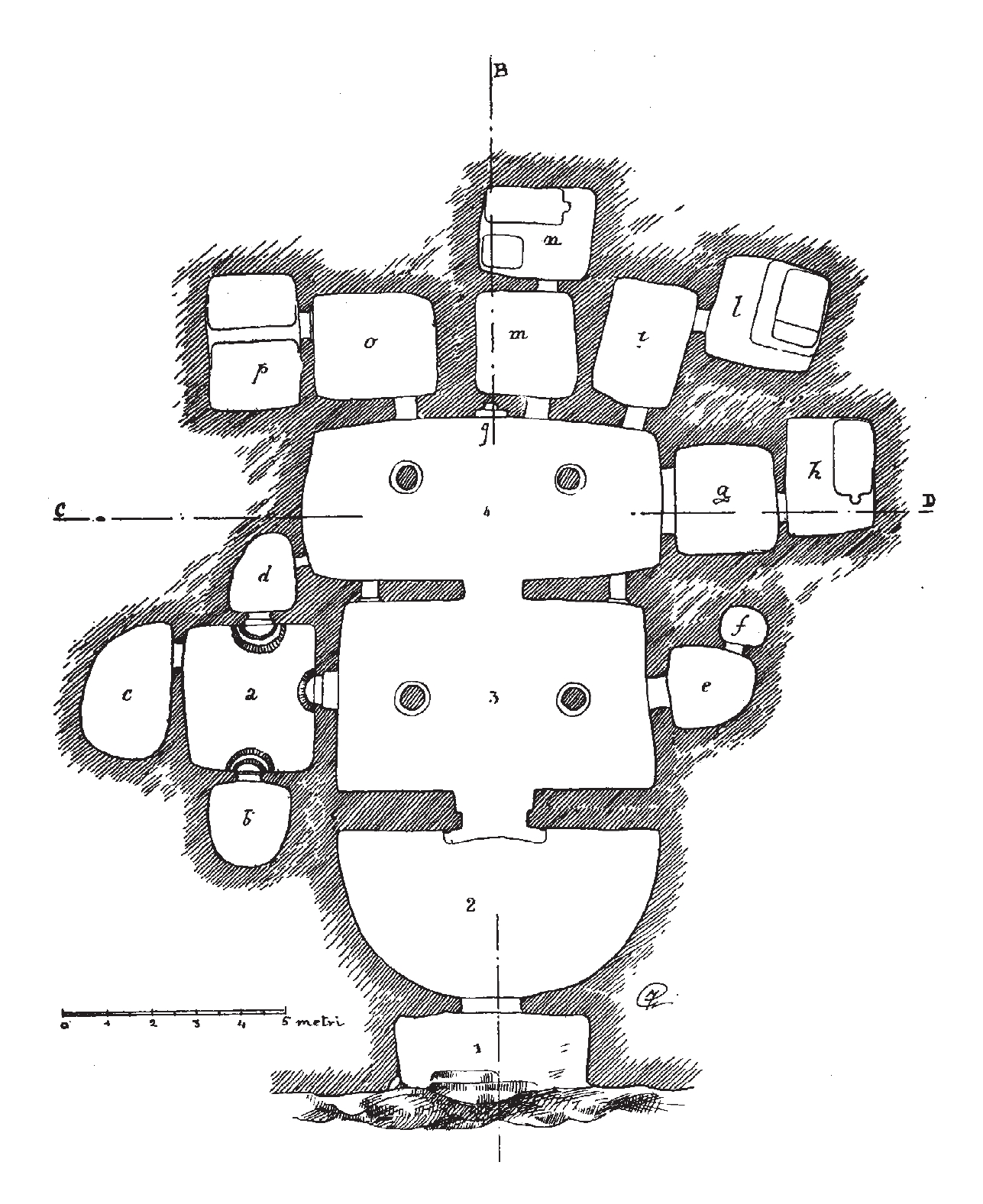
Plan of the Tomb of the Chief, Necropolis of Sant'Andrea Priu.

== See also ==
- History of Sardinia
- Pre-Nuragic Sardinia
- Necropolis of Santu Pedru
- Hypogeum
- Enchanted Moura

== Bibliography ==
- Giovanni Lilliu, La civiltà dei Sardi dal neolitico all'età dei nuraghi, Torino, Edizioni ERI, 1967
- AA.VV. La civiltà in Sardegna nei secoli, Torino, Edizioni ERI
- AA.VV., Ichnussa. Sardegna dalle origini all'età classica, Milano, 1981
- Alberto Moravetti, Guide archeologiche Sardegna 2, 1995
