= Necropolis of Is Calitas =

Archaeological site in Soleminis, Italy

- Necropoli di Is Calitas (Italian)
- Location within Italy
- 39°20′05″N 9°11′22″E
- Type: Necropolis
- Cultures: Pre-Nuragic Sardinia
- Location: Soleminis, Sardinia, Italy
- Region: Sardinia

History
- Built: 2nd millennium BC

Site notes
- Management: Superintendence for the Archaeological Heritage in the Provinces of Cagliari and Oristano (Soprintendenza per i Beni Archeologici per le province di Cagliari e Oristano)
- Public access: No

The necropolis of Is Calitas is an archaeological site located in the municipality of Soleminis, in the province of South Sardinia.

== Description ==
The tomb, located on the top of a small hill, is of the pit type, dug partly in the ground and partly in the rock, and was probably covered with stone slabs.

The objects found, including ceramics, bronze objects and necklaces, are attributable to the Bonnanaro culture (first half of the 2nd millennium BC) and show in part a derivation from the previous Bell Beaker culture, in particular of its Central European variant.

The site was excavated in 1995 by Maria Rosaria Manunza.

== Physical anthropology ==
Since it was a collective burial, 79 skeletons were recovered during the excavations which made it possible to establish that the buried population was fairly tall (average height for men 169 cm, women 154 cm), robust and did not suffer from particular pathologies. 21 skulls recovered in the tomb had been studied, 14 are dolichocephalic and 7 brachycephalic.

== Bibliography ==
- Maria Rosaria Manunza, Cuccuru cresia arta. Indagini archeologiche a Soleminis, Grafica del Parteolla, 2005
