= Necropolis of Su Crucifissu Mannu =

Archaeological site in Porto Torres, Sardinia

Coordinates: 40.8103°N 8.4442°E

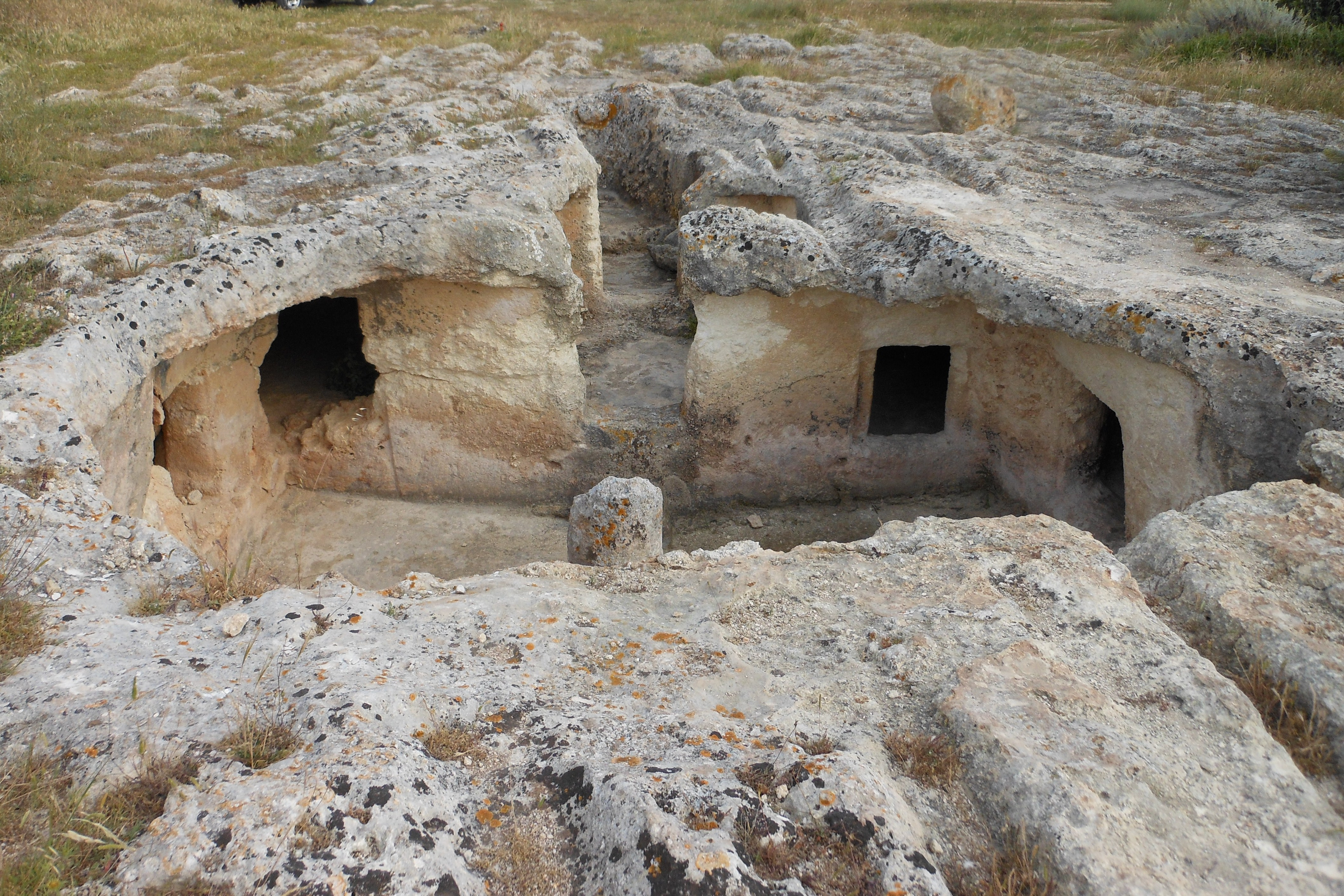
- Interactive map of Necropolis of Su Crucifissu Mannu
- Type: Burial
- Periods: Neolithic, Chalcolithic, Bronze Age
- Cultures: Pre-Nuragic Sardinia
- Location: Porto Torres, Sardinia, Italy

UNESCO World Heritage Site
- Part of: Funerary Tradition in the Prehistory of Sardinia – The domus de janas
- Criteria: Cultural: iii
- Reference: 1730-007
- Inscription: 2025 (47th Session)

The necropolis of Su Crucifissu Mannu (in English: The great crucifix) is an archaeological site located in the municipality of Porto Torres, Sardinia.

The necropolis includes at least twenty-two domus de janas, all made in the period between the Neolithic (IV millennium BC ) and the Copper Age (III millennium BC) and intensely used until the time of Bonnanaro culture (1800–1600 BC).

Some internal chambers are decorated with symbolic elements (stylized bull's horns) and architectural elements (steps, false doors, lintels) typical of the period, carved in relief in the rock.

== Gallery ==
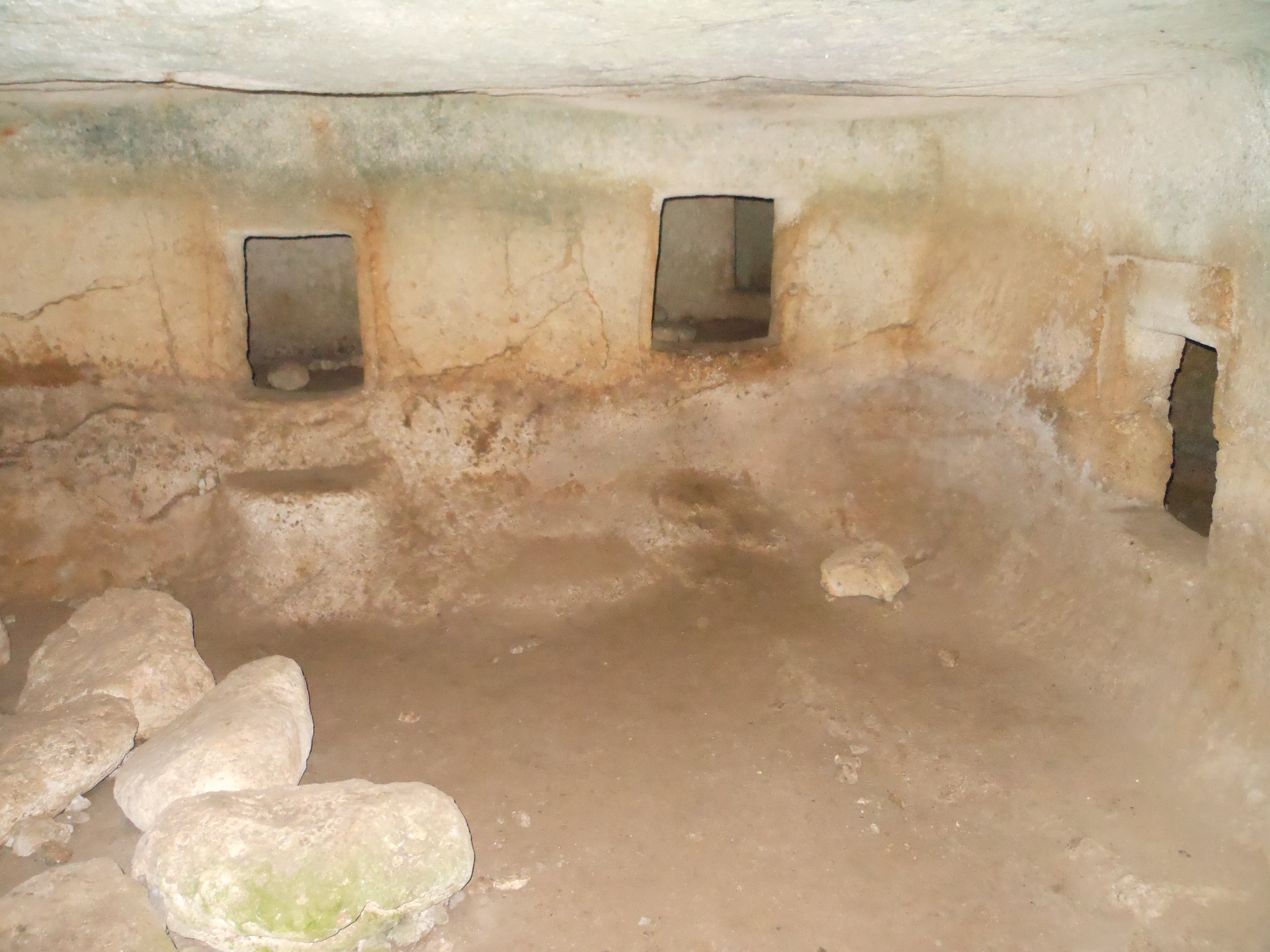

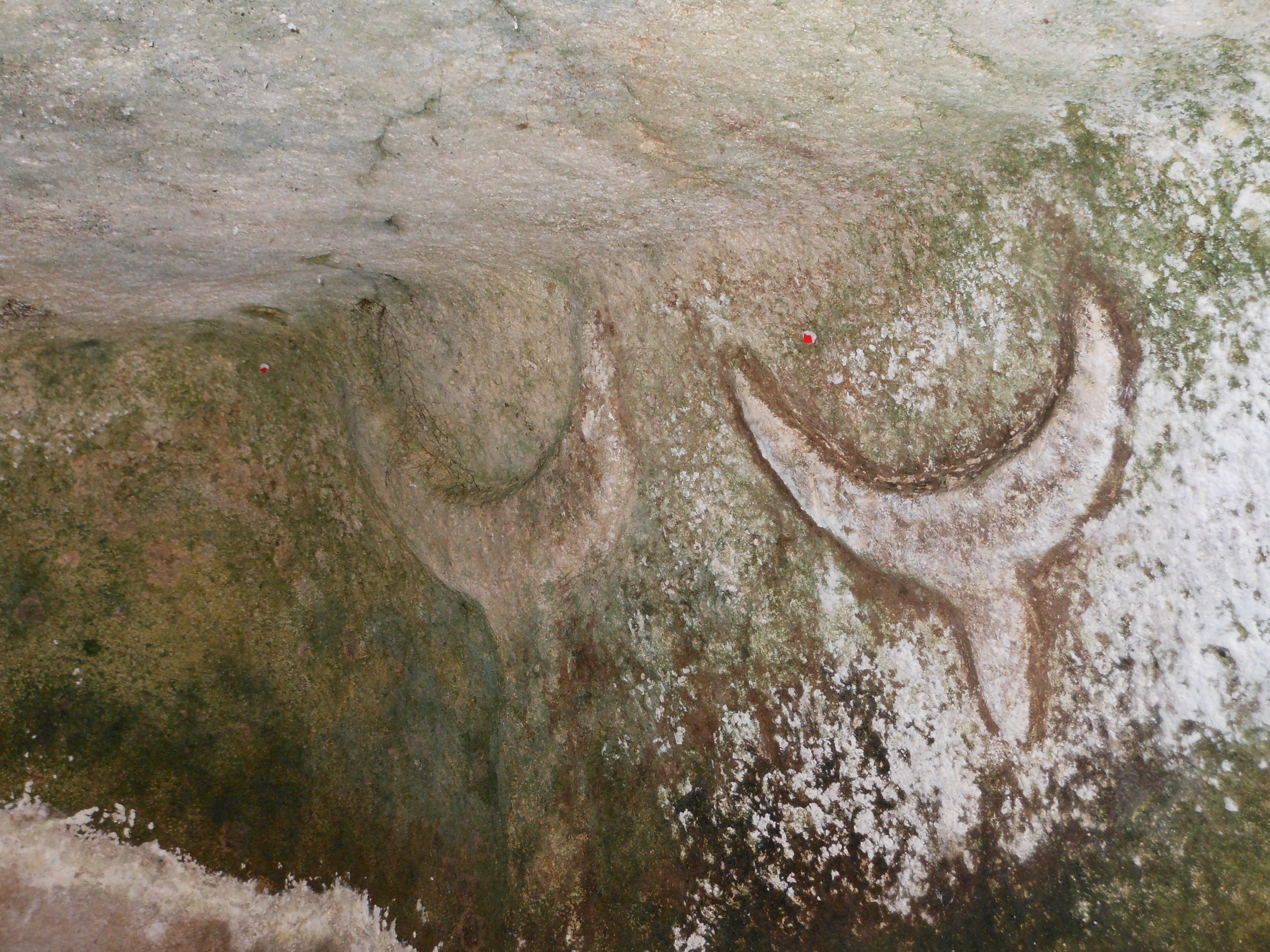

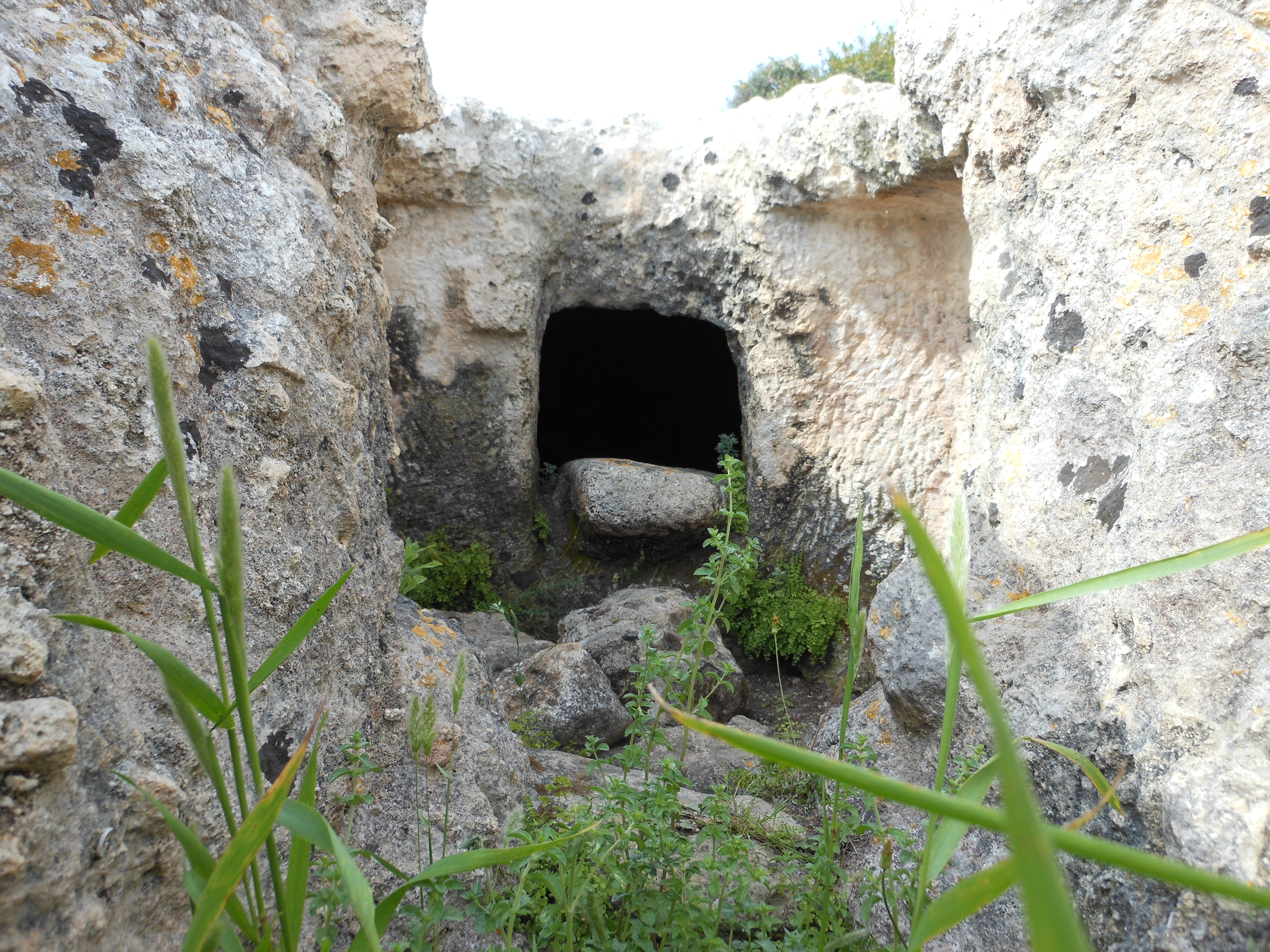

== Bibliography ==
- Maria Luisa Ferrarese Ceruti, La tomba XVI di Su Crucifissu Mannu e la Cultura di Bonnanaro, in Bullettino di Paletnologia Italiana, nuova serie, XXIII, vol. 81, 1972–1974, Roma 1976, pp. 113–210
- Maria Luisa Ferrarese Ceruti, Le necropoli di Su Crucifissu Mannu-Porto Torres e Ponte Secco-Sassari, in La Cultura di Ozieri. Problematiche e nuove acquisizioni, Ozieri, 1989, pp. 37–47
- Giovanni Maria Demartis, Tomba V di Montalè – Sassari. Necropoli di Su Crucifissu Mannu- Porto torres, Collana Il triangolo della Nurra, 2–4, Viterbo, 1998, Betagamma editrice
