= Necropolis of Sant'Andrea Priu =

Archaeological site in Bonorva, Italy

Coordinates: 40.4214°N 8.8469°E

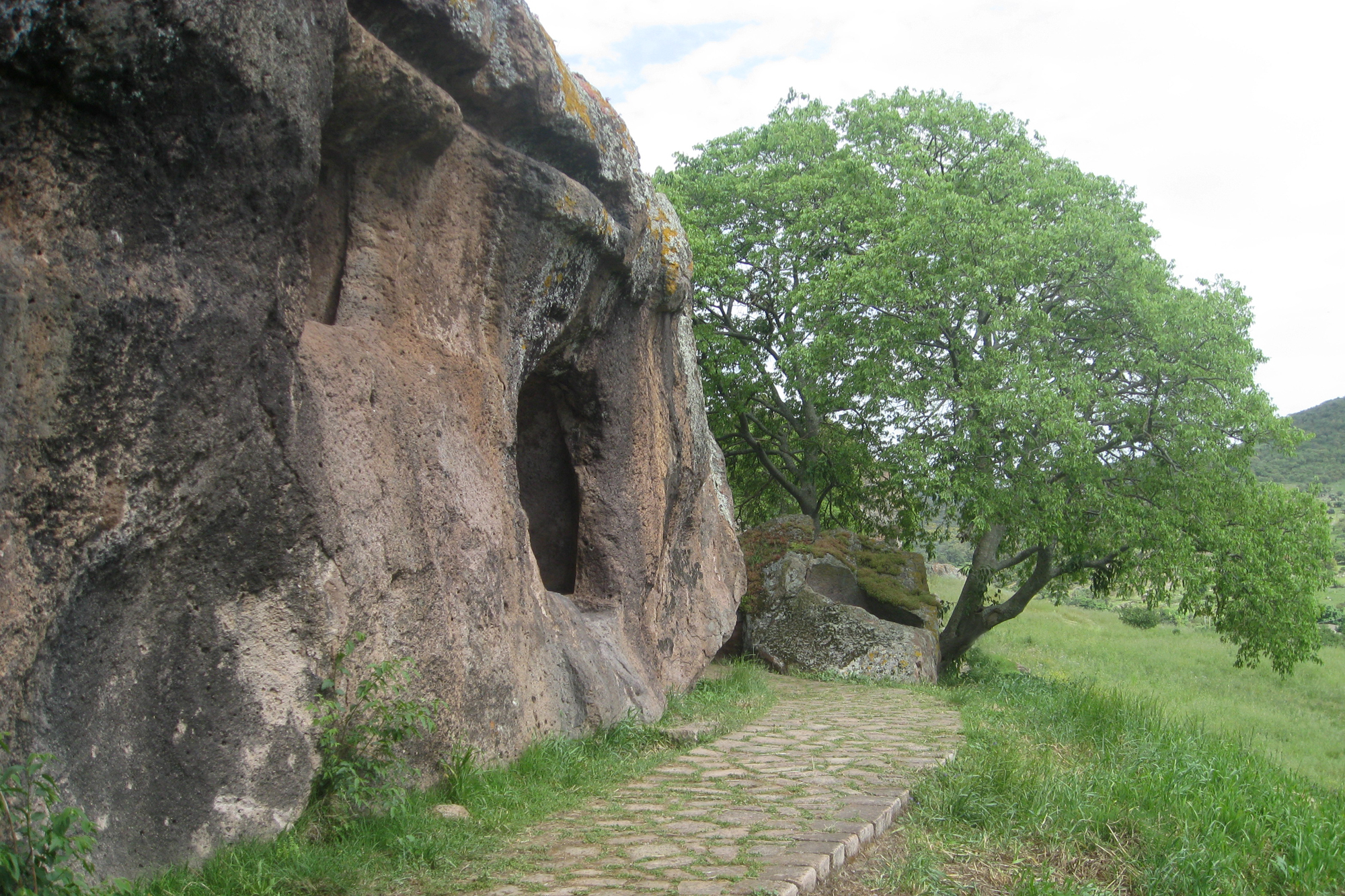
- Interactive map of Necropolis of Sant'Andrea Priu
- Type: Burial
- Cultures: Pre-Nuragic Sardinia
- Location: Bonorva, Sardinia, Italy

UNESCO World Heritage Site
- Part of: Funerary Tradition in the Prehistory of Sardinia – The domus de janas
- Criteria: Cultural: iii
- Reference: 1730-015
- Inscription: 2025 (47th Session)

The necropolis of Sant'Andrea Priu is an archaeological site located on the south side of the fertile plain of Saint Lucia, in the municipality of Bonorva, Sardinia. The complex, one of the most important of the island, is composed of twenty domus de janas; one of them with its eighteen rooms appears to be one of the largest hypogean tombs of the Mediterranean basin.

The necropolis is located on the front of a trachytic outcrop high 10 m and long 180; entrances to the domus are all within a few meters in height from the ground level and some of them are difficult to access because of the detachment of a substantial part of the rock face. The interior of the domus de janas is a faithful reproduction of the houses of that time, with many architectural details (beams, joists, lintels, jambs, pillars and wainscoting perimeter), tending to recreate an environment similar to that where the deceased had spent his existence.

Chronologically, the complex is dated to the Ozieri culture of the Final Neolithic (3500–2900 BC) with partial use and also structural changes of some tombs which continued until the Middle Ages.

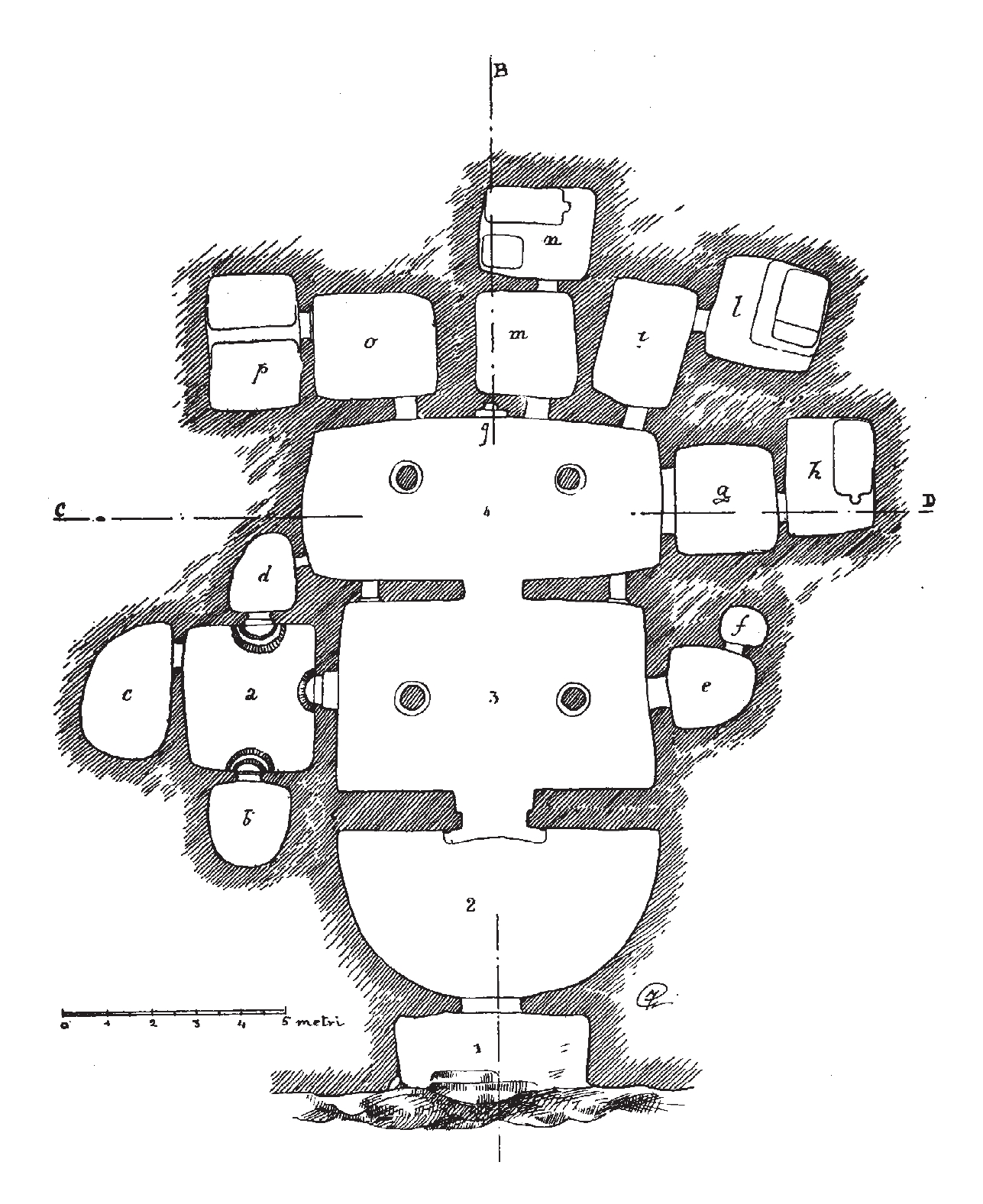
Chief tomb plan

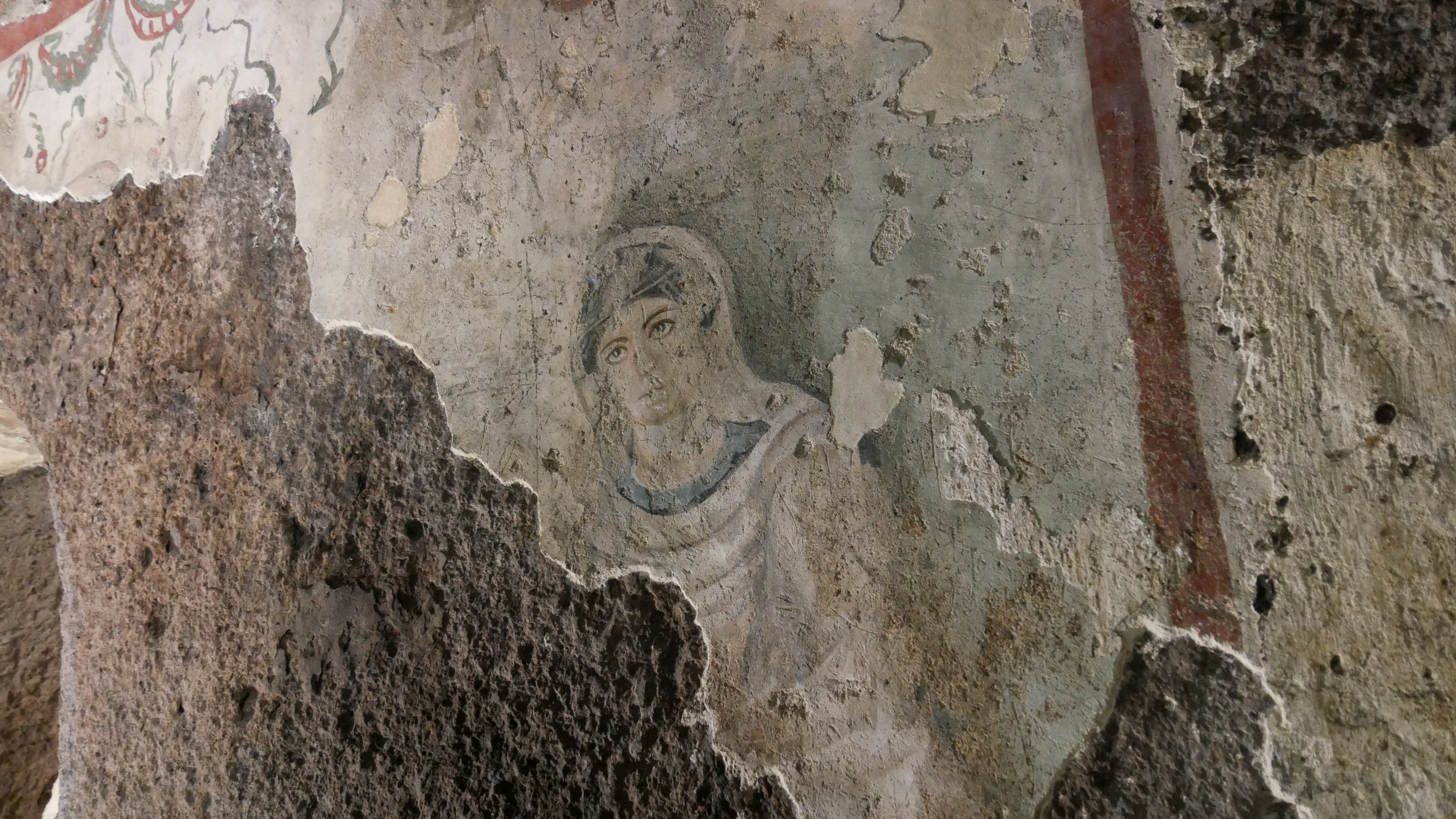
Early Christian fresco

Among the domus, three of them, the Tomb of the Chief, the Circular Hut tomb and the Chamber tomb, are of particular importance for their spectacularity and their high degree of conservation.

== Bibliography ==
- G. Spano, Catacombe di Sant'Andrea Abriu presso Bonorva, in Bullettino Archeologico Sardo 11, II, 1856, pp. 170–179
- A. Taramelli, Fortezze, recinti, fonti sacre e necropoli preromane nell'agro di Bonorva, in Monumenti Antichi dei Lincei, vol. XXXV, Roma 1919, coll. 765–904
- A. Malatesta, Il cosiddetto campanile della necropoli nuragica di S. Andria Priu (Bonorva), in Rivista di scienze preistoriche, IX, 1954, pp. 105–113
- G. Lilliu, La civiltà dei Sardi: dal neolitico all’età dei nuraghi, Torino, ERI, 1975, p. 113 ss.
- V. Santoni, Nota preliminare sulla tipologia delle grotticelle artificiali funerarie in Sardegna, in Archivio storico sardo, II, 1976, pp. 3–49
- C. Zervos, Le civilisation de la Sardaigne du debut de l'eneolithique à la fin de la période nouragique, Paris, 1959 (traduzione e ristampa, Roma, 1980, Libreria Scientifica Internazionale, pp. 246–257)
- R. Caprara, La necropoli di sant'Andrea Priu, Collana Sardegna Archeologica – Serie Guide e itinerari, 3, Sassari, 1983, Carlo Delfino editore
- A. Foschi, Bonorva (Sassari) Loc. S. Andrea Priu, in I Sardi, Milano, Jaca Book, 1984, pp. 287–289
- G. Deriu, L'insediamento umano medioevale nella curatoria di Costa de Addes, Sassari, Magnum, 2000; Cagliari, Logus Mondi Interattivi, 2012 https://web.archive.org/web/20120819194007/http://www.logus.it/ebookCatalogo.html
- G. Deriu – S. Chessa, Meilogu, tomo II, Cargeghe, Documenta, 2014, scheda "Priu (Abriu o Frius)".
