= Midi =

Midi or MIDI may refer to:

== Music ==
- MIDI, a communications protocol for media interfaces
- Midi (Hi-Fi system), a type of integrated hifi audio system
- Midi, Maxi & Efti, a Swedish musical group with African influences from the early 1990s
- Black Midi, an English rock band

== Entertainment ==
- Berliner (format) or "midi", a newspaper format with pages normally measuring about 470 mm × 315 mm (18 1/2 in × 12 3/8 in)

== People ==
- Domnall Midi (before 715–763), King of Mide and High King of Ireland
- Donnchad Midi (died 797), King of Mide from about 766, son of Domnall Midi
- General Midi (DJ), British breakbeats DJ, real name Paul Crossman
- Jin Midi (134 BC – 86 BC), Han dynasty official of Xiongnu ethnicity

== Transport ==
- Bedford Midi, a medium-sized panel van produced in the period 1986—94 by GM Vauxhall
- Mitsubishi Fuso Aero Midi, a medium-duty bus built by Mitsubishi Fuso
- Brussels-South railway station, known as Bruxelles-Midi in French

== Geography ==
- Southern France (in colloquial French and some contexts in English)
- Midi-Pyrénées, a former administrative region of France
- Midi District, district of Hajjah Governorate in Yemen

== Other uses ==
- MITI, in Japan is the Ministry of International Trade and Industry
- Midi skirt, a mid-calf length skirt (1970s)
- Mid-IR Interferometric instrument or MIDI, a former instrument of the Very Large Telescope in Chile
- Multi-Indicator Drought Index, a summary map of drought conditions in the U.S. published by the NOAA National Weather Service’s Climate Prediction Center
- The Midi, the most recently created size of crossword puzzle for New York Times Games, with a size between that of the regular puzzle and the Mini.
