= Soleminis =

Soleminis Solèminis
- Comune
- Comune di Soleminis
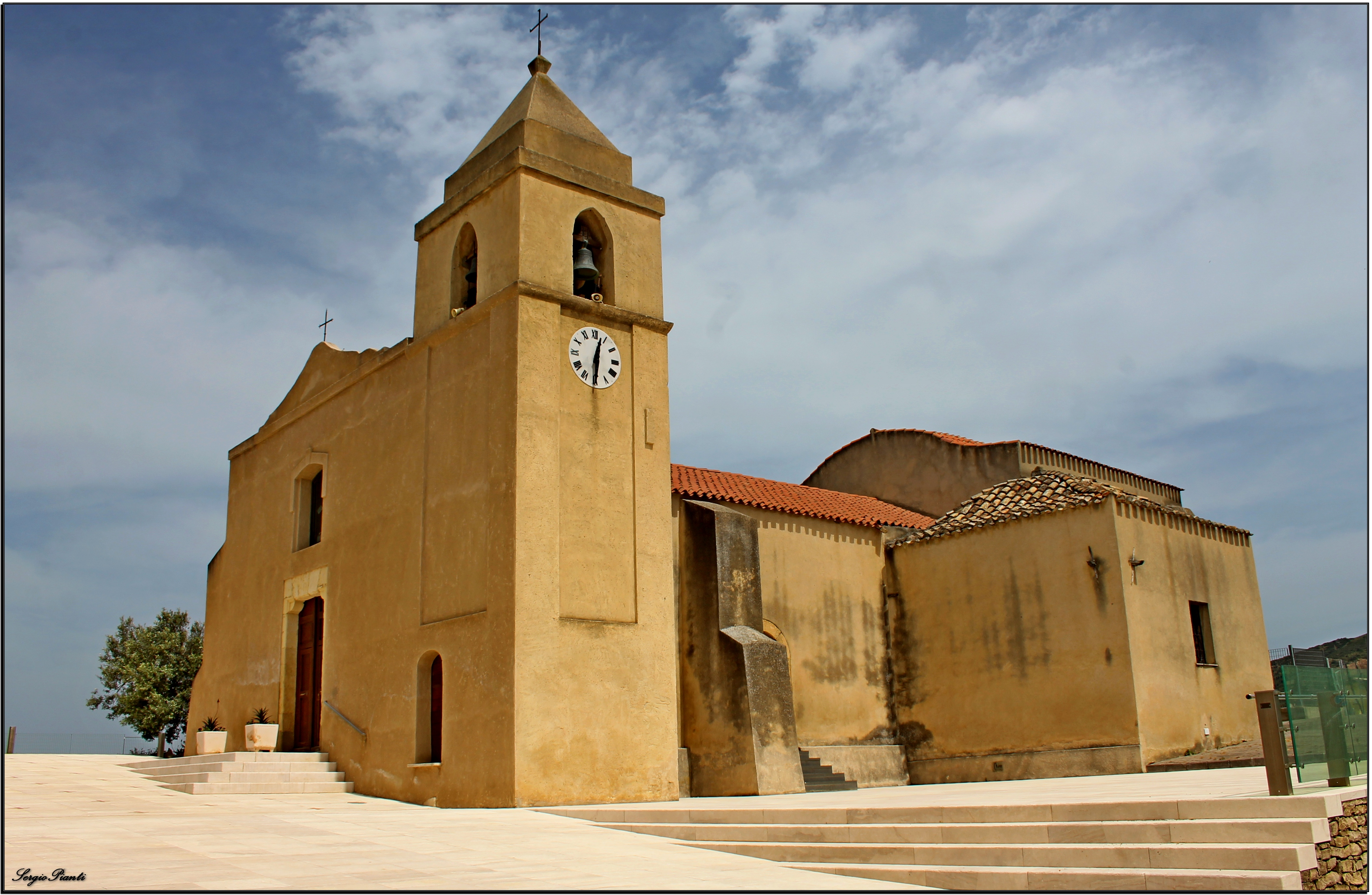
- Church of St. James

- Location within Sardinia
- Coordinates: 39°21′N 9°11′E
- Country: Italy
- Region: Sardinia
- Metropolitan city: Cagliari (CA)

Area
  - Total: 13.0 km^{2} (5.0 sq mi)

Population (Dec. 2004)
  - Total: 1,698
  - Density: 131/km^{2} (338/sq mi)
- Time zone: UTC+1 (CET)
  - Summer (DST): UTC+2 (CEST)
- Postal code: 09040
- Dialing code: 070

Soleminis (Sardinian: Solèminis) is a comune (municipality) in the Metropolitan City of Cagliari in the Italian region Sardinia, located about 15 kilometres (9 mi) northeast of Cagliari. As of 31 December 2004, it had a population of 1,698 and an area of 13.0 square kilometres (5.0 mi^{2}).

Soleminis borders the following municipalities: Dolianova, Serdiana, Settimo San Pietro, Sinnai.

== Demographic evolution ==
Historical population

Year	Pop.	±%
1861	465	—
1871	350	−24.7%
1881	374	+6.9%
1901	382	+2.1%
1911	461	+20.7%

Year	Pop.	±%
1921	518	+12.4%
1931	557	+7.5%
1936	635	+14.0%
1951	765	+20.5%
1961	858	+12.2%

Year	Pop.	±%
1971	970	+13.1%
1981	1,179	+21.5%
1991	1,338	+13.5%
2001	1,587	+18.6%

Source: Data from ISTAT

== See also ==
- Necropolis of Is Calitas
