= Bonnanaro culture =

2nd millennium BCE, protohistoric Archaeological culture in Sardinia

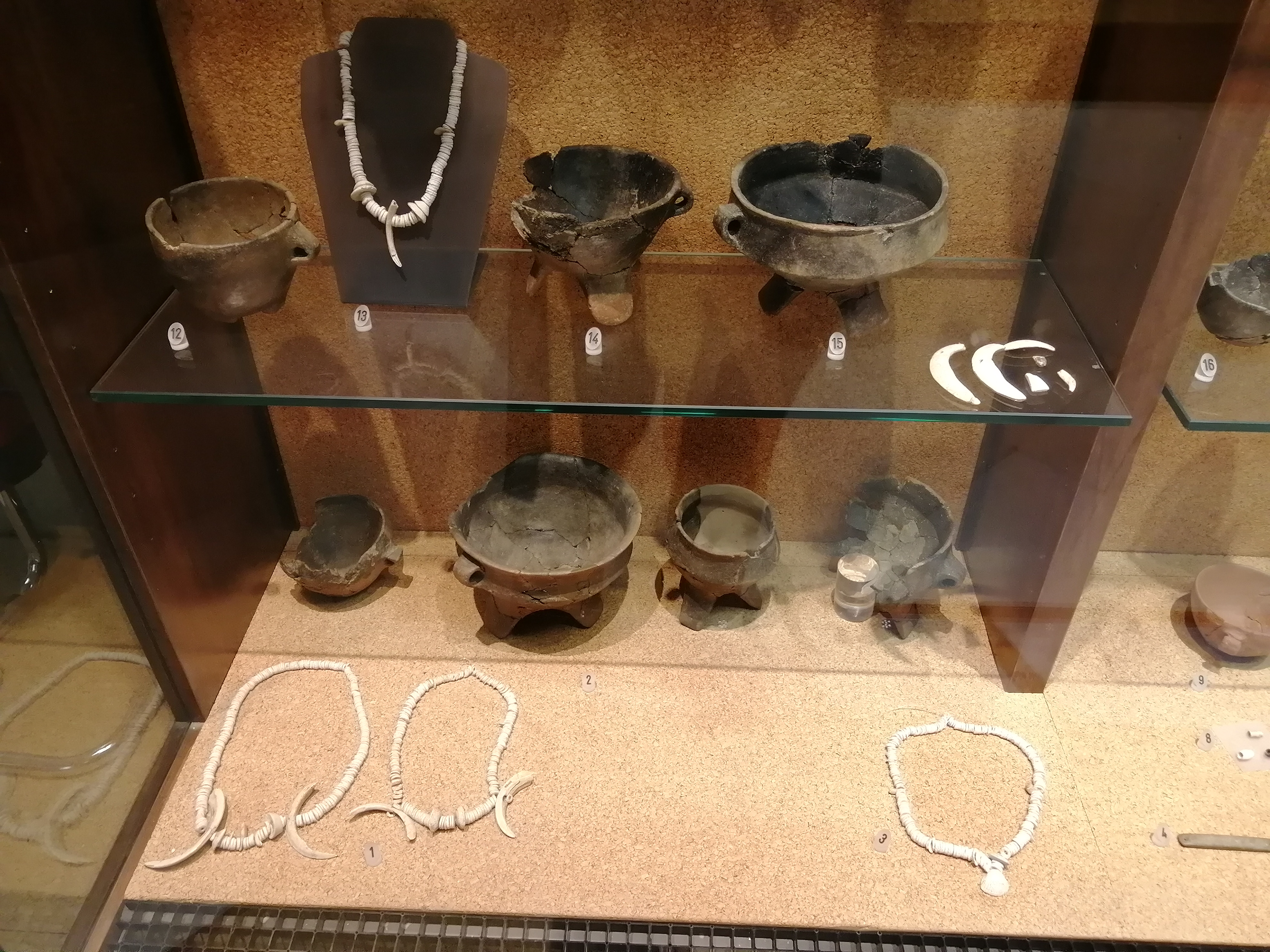
Necklaces and ceramics from the necropolis of Is Calitas, Soleminis

The Bonnanaro culture is a protohistoric culture that flourished in Sardinia during the 2nd millennium BC (1800–1600 BC), considered to be the first stage of the Nuragic civilization. It takes its name from the comune of Bonnanaro in the province of Sassari where in 1889 the eponymous site was discovered.

== Chronology ==
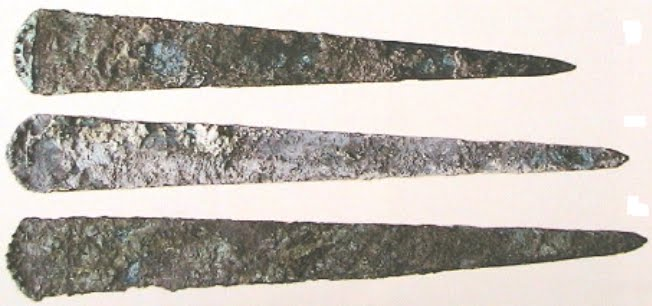
Swords of the Bonnanaro culture (A2 phase) from the Hypogeum of Sant'Iroxi, Decimoputzu

The Bonnanaro culture is divided chronologically into two main phases:

Phase	Dates
Bonnanaro A1 Corona Moltana	1800–1650 BC
Bonnanaro A2 Sant'Iroxi	1650–1600 BC

== Origin ==
According to Giovanni Lilliu the people who produced this culture probably originated in Central Europe and the Polada culture/Rhône culture area. From a material culture point of view, the Bonnanaro culture shows influences of the preceding pan-European Bell Beaker culture, the post-Beaker (epicampaniforme) Polada culture from northern Italy, the Remedello culture, Rinaldone culture and El Argar culture.

M.Perra (1997) theorizes a season of conflict between the Chalcolithic natives and the groups of Beaker heritage which caused a general involution, typical of this historical phase.

== Description ==
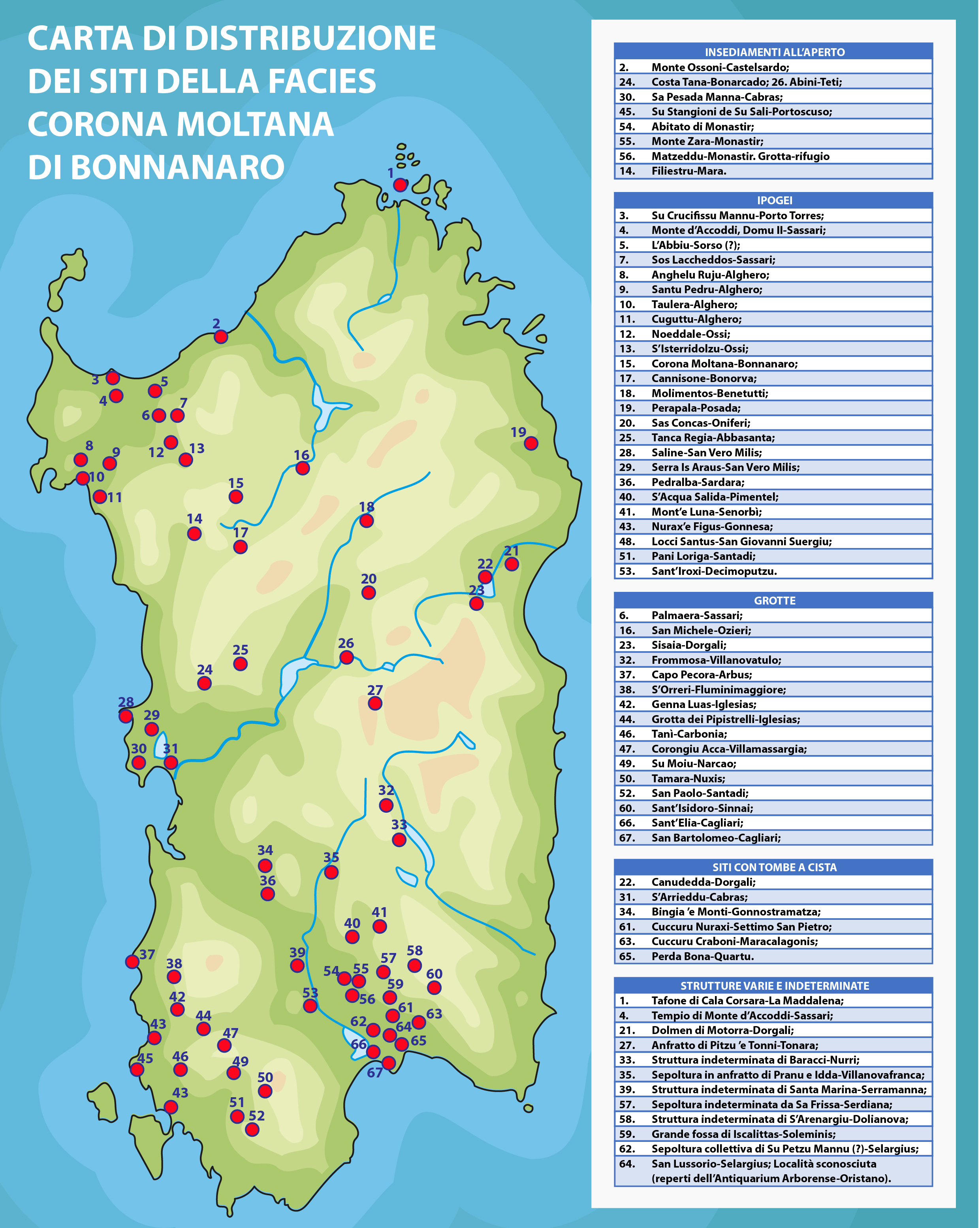
Sites of the Corona Moltana phase

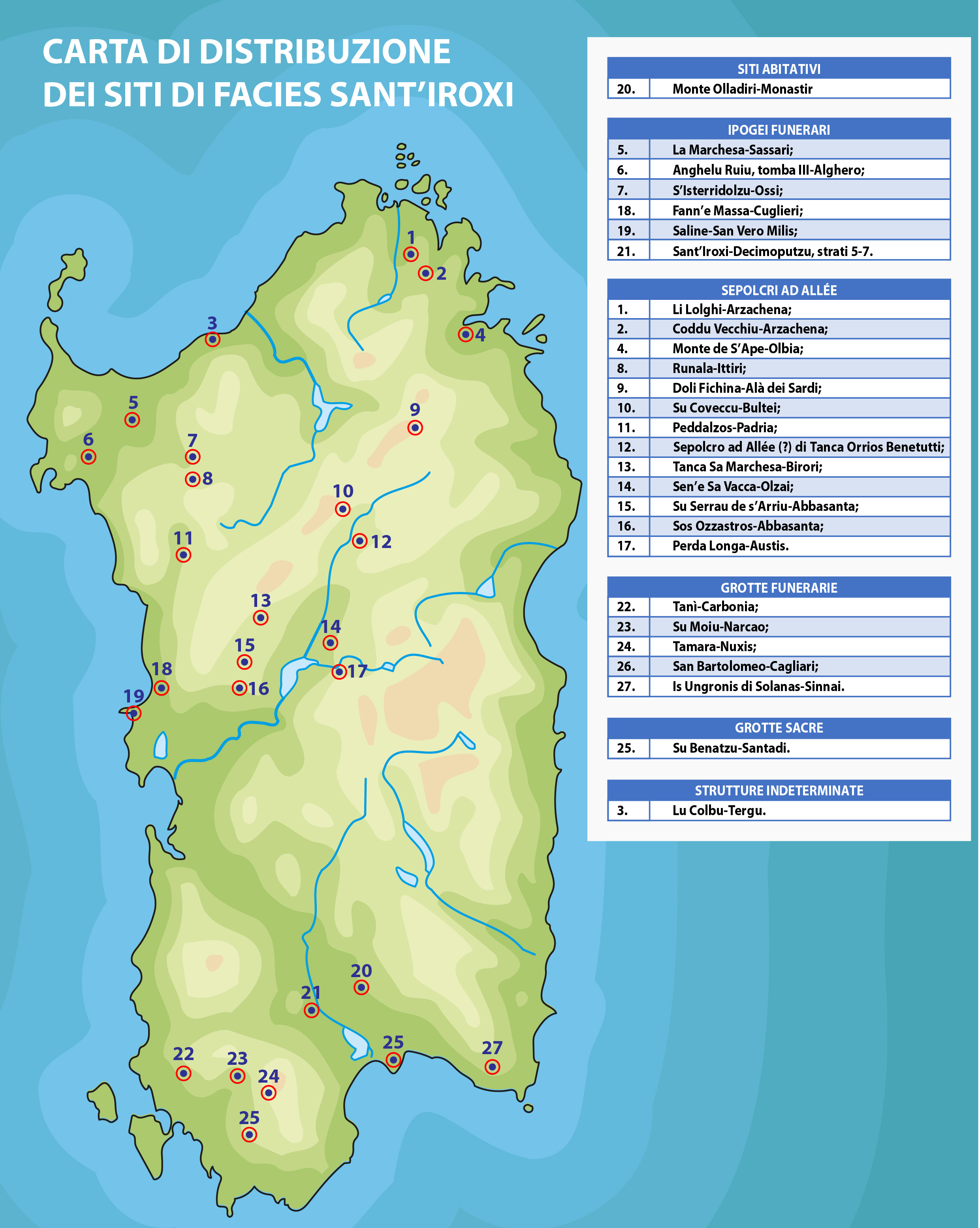
Sites of the Sant'Iroxi phase

Bonnanaro sites, mostly burials, are scattered throughout Sardinian territory, with a higher concentration in the mining regions of Nurra and Sulcis-Iglesiente and in the Campidano. Ceramics were smooth and linear without decorations and characterized by handles. Numbers of metal objects increased and the first swords of arsenical bronze appeared.

Metal objects may have been partly imported from continental Europe. Copper awls found in the necropolis of Anghelu Ruju show a chemical composition similar to that of artifacts from the Remedello area, in Lombardy. Other imports may be represented by necklaces with deer teeth, found at various sites in the southern Campidano, which show similarities with contemporary ones from the Veneto region, and by an El Argar-type sword from southern Sardinia.

Only four settlements of this culture are known: Su Campu Lontanu Florinas, Sa Turricula Muros, Costa Tana Bonarcado and Abiti Teti. The houses had a base of masonry while the roof was made of wood and branches.

It is still uncertain whether the first "protonuraghi" or "pseudonuraghi" were built at this time, or in the successive Sub-Bonnanaro culture (or Bonnanaro B) of the Middle Bronze Age (1600–1330 BC), although C14 on organic finds from the Protonuraghe Bruncu Madugui (Gesturi) suggest that it was built sometime around 1820 BC. The Proto-Nuraghi were megalithic edifices which are considered the precursors of the classic Nuraghi. They are horizontal buildings characterized by a long corridor with rooms and cells.

The Bonnanaro grave typologies include the domus de janas, caves, cists and allée couvertes.

== Physical anthropology ==
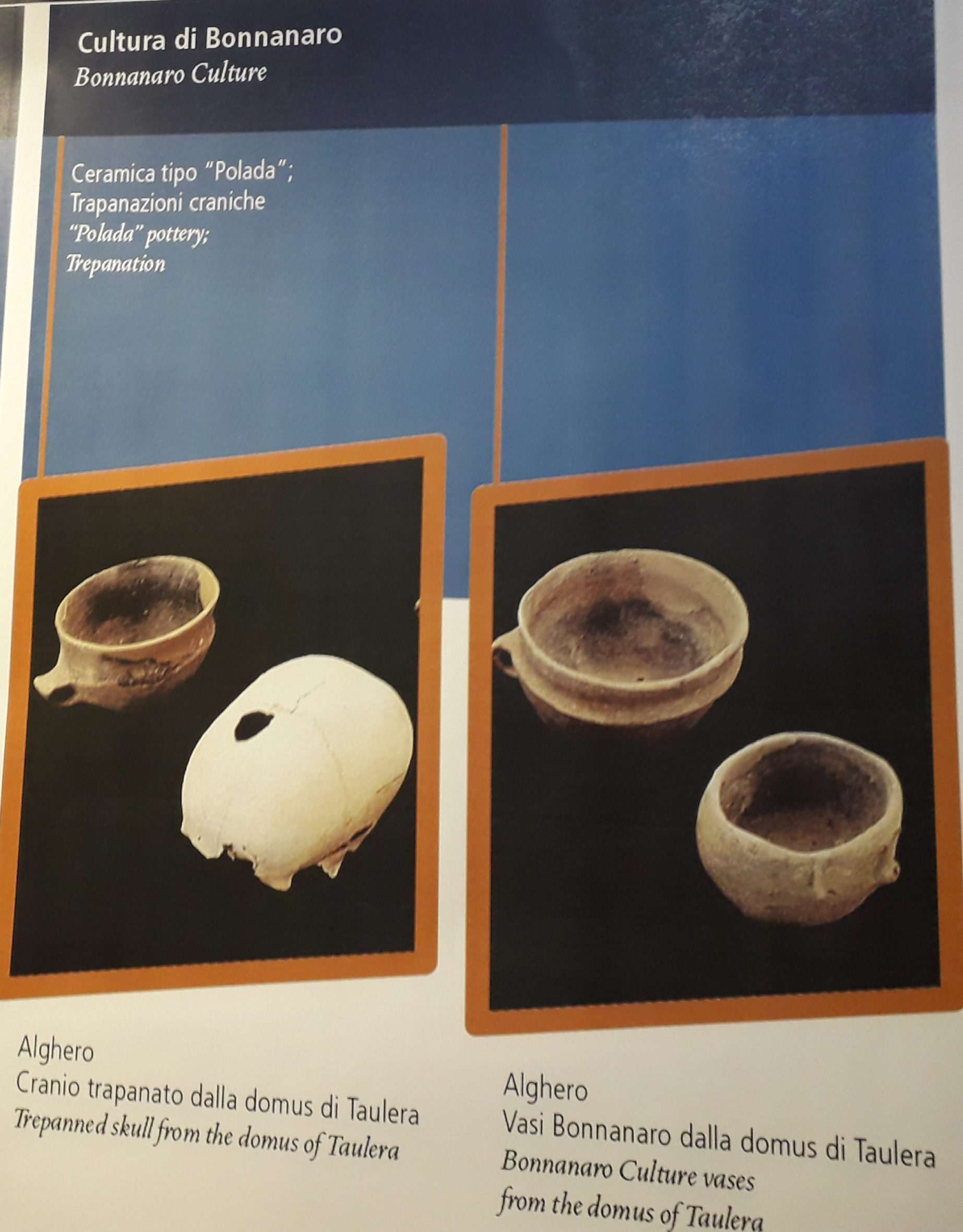
Informative panel about the Bonnanaro culture. A trepanned skull is shown in the lower left

About 200 human skeletons of the period show that the Bonnanaro population (phase A1) was composed mainly of dolicochepalic individuals (67%) with a minority of brachycephalics (33%), the latter concentrated in the north-western portion of the island. The average height was 1.62 m for men and 1.59 m for women. The Bonnanaro population suffered from osteoporosis, hyperostosis, anemia, caries and tumors. Cranial trepannation was practiced.

Morphometric comparisons conducted by Franco Germanà (1984) highlighted the greatest similarities with Eneolithic human groups (Monte Claro, Anghelu Ruju, Rinaldone-Gaudo, SOM, a sample from Portugal, and the German Bell Beaker) and with Bronze Age groups from the north-western Mediterranean (Polada groups from the French Midi and Catalans from the 2nd millennium BC).

A study by G. D'Amore, S. Di Marco, G. Floris, E. Pacciani, and E. Sanna from 2010, which analyzed craniofacial morphometric variations in Sardinia from the Late Neolithic to the present, found a lower morphological differentiation between the populations of the Bonnanaro culture and the contemporary samples from the Italian Peninsula compared to earlier and later Sardinian populations.

== Paleogenetics ==
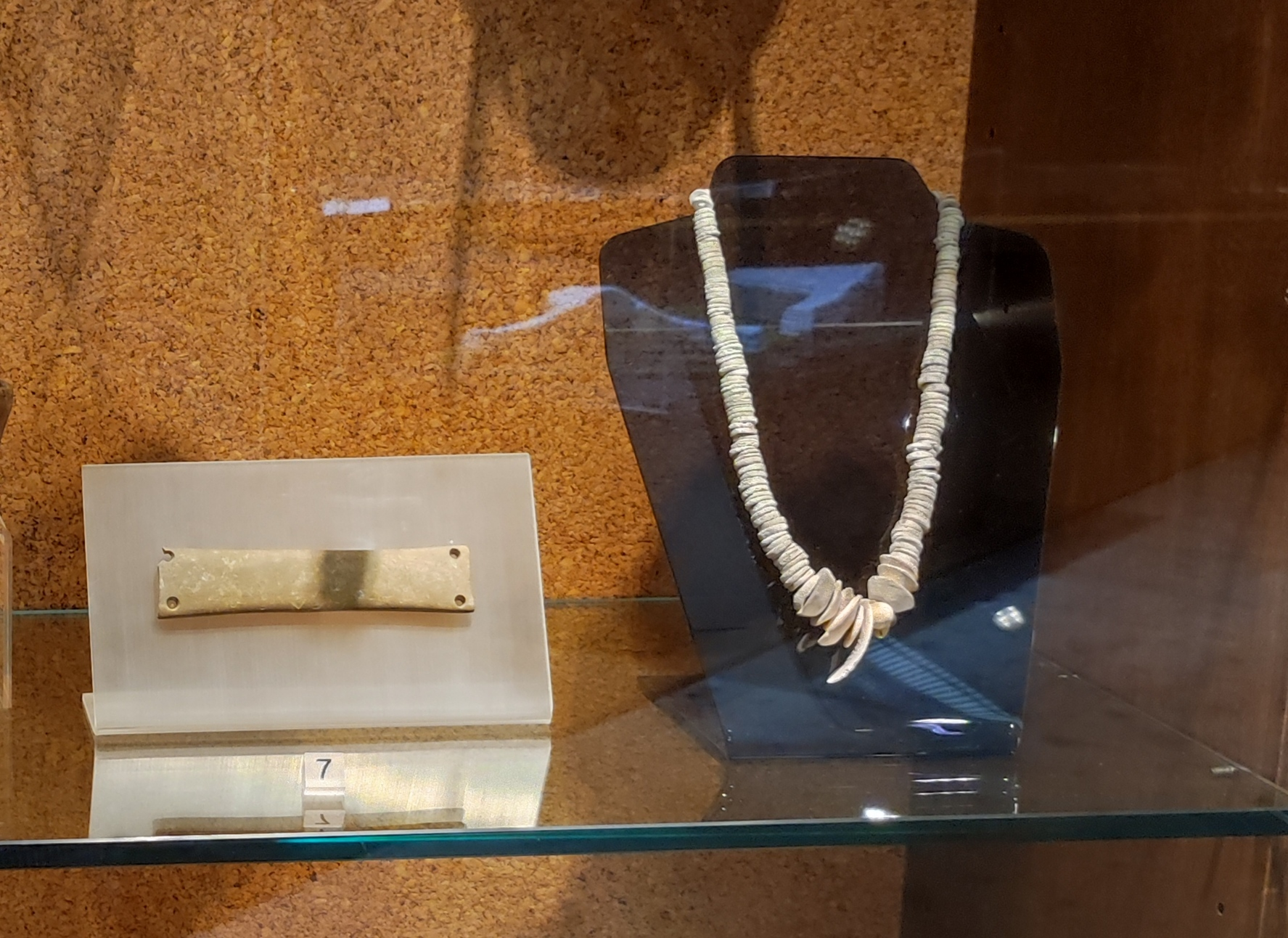
Stone wrist-guard and necklace from Cuccuru Nuraxi, Settimo San Pietro

A 2022 study by Marjusha Chintalapati et al. found evidences of moderate steppe-related ancestry (although minoritarian compared to Western Hunter-Gatherer and Early European Farmer ancestries) in some of the Early Bronze Age Sardinians from the North-West (e.g. necropolis of Su Crucifissu Mannu) and Central part of the Island.

Sample	Western Hunter-Gatherers	Early European Farmers	Western Steppe Herders
SUC001	16,2%	80%	3,8%
SUC005	20,9%	77,8%	1,3%
SUC007	21,5%	68,1%	10,4%
SUC009	17,8%	79,4%	2,8%
S1250	18,5%	69,7%	11,8%
S1252	17,9%	78,3%	3,8%
ISB001	13,6%	78,1%	8,2%
PJU002	24,7%	74%	1,3%

^{(1)} - Data from Manjusha Chintalapati, Nick Patterson, Priya Moorjani (2022). Table J: qpAdm analysis of Neolithic Bronze Age groups per individual

Genetic data appears to support the hypothesis of a patrilocal society.

== See also ==
- Pre-Nuragic Sardinia
- Beaker culture in Sardinia
- Nuragic civilization
- History of Sardinia

== Bibliography ==
- Germanà, Franco (1995). L'uomo in Sardegna dal paleolitico fino all'età nuragica (in Italian). Delfino Carlo Editore. ISBN 9788871381060.
- Lilliu, Giovanni (2004). La civiltà dei Sardi. Dal Paleolitico all'età dei nuraghi (in Italian). Edizioni il Maestrale. ISBN 978-88-86109-73-4.
- Ugas, Giovanni (2005). L'alba dei nuraghi (in Italian). Cagliari: Fabula Editore. ISBN 978-88-89661-00-0.
- Webster, Gary S. (2015). The Archaeology of Nuragic Sardinia. Equinox Publishing. ISBN 978-1781791356.
