= Abealzu-Filigosa culture =

Copper Age culture in Sardinia

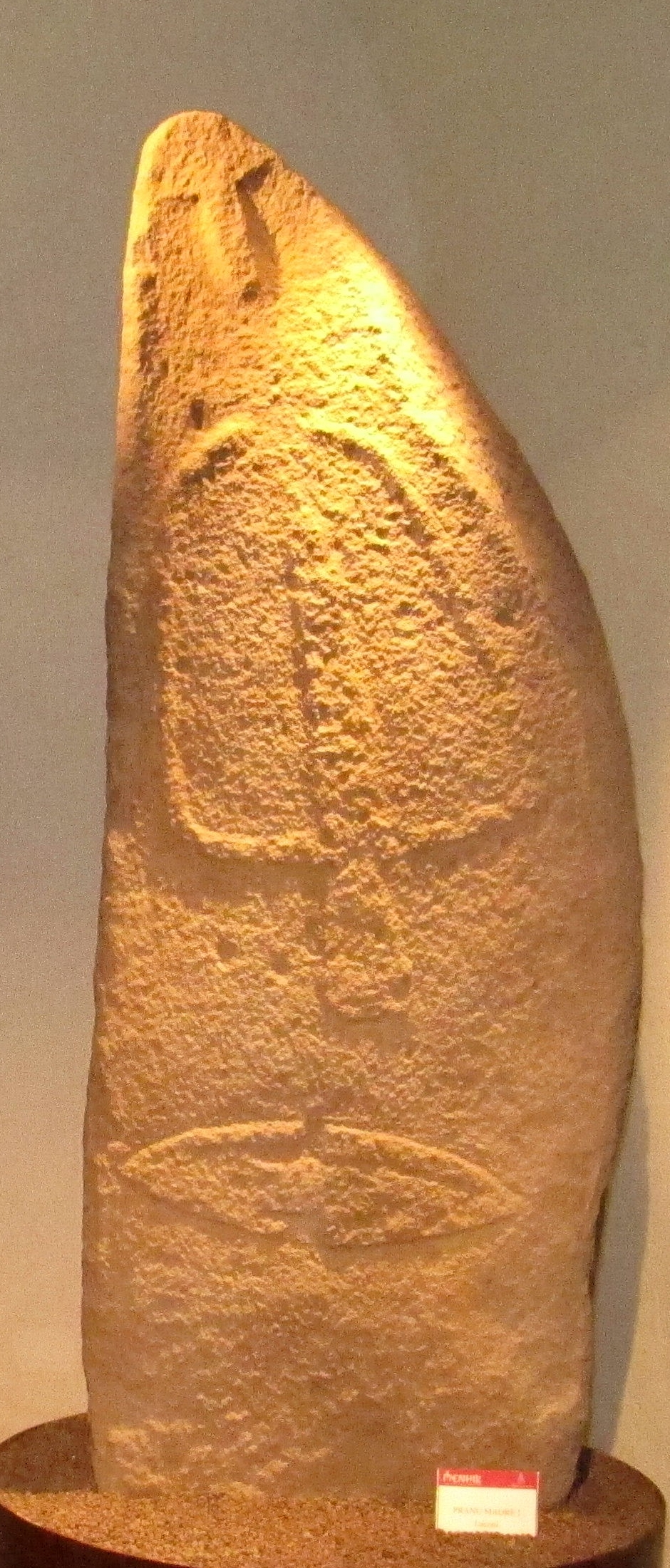
Statue menhir, Laconi

The Abealzu-Filigosa culture was a Copper Age culture of Sardinia (2700-2400 BC). It takes its name from the locality of Abealzu, near Osilo, and Filigosa, near Macomer.

The populations of this culture lived mainly in the Sassarese area and other parts of central-southern Sardinia. They still used obsidian to produce tools and weapons but copper objects, such as the daggers depicted in the Statue menhir, were becoming common. Lead and silver were also smelted. Their economy was focused on pastoralism and agriculture. They worshipped warrior ancestors and created megalithic monuments. The second phase of construction of the massive megalithic temple of Monte d'Accoddi dates to this phase.

The pottery of Abealzu show some similarities with those of the Rinaldone and Gaudo culture from the Italian Peninsula.

== See also ==
- Pre-Nuragic Sardinia
