= Monte d'Accoddi =

Neolithic archaeological site in northern Sardinia

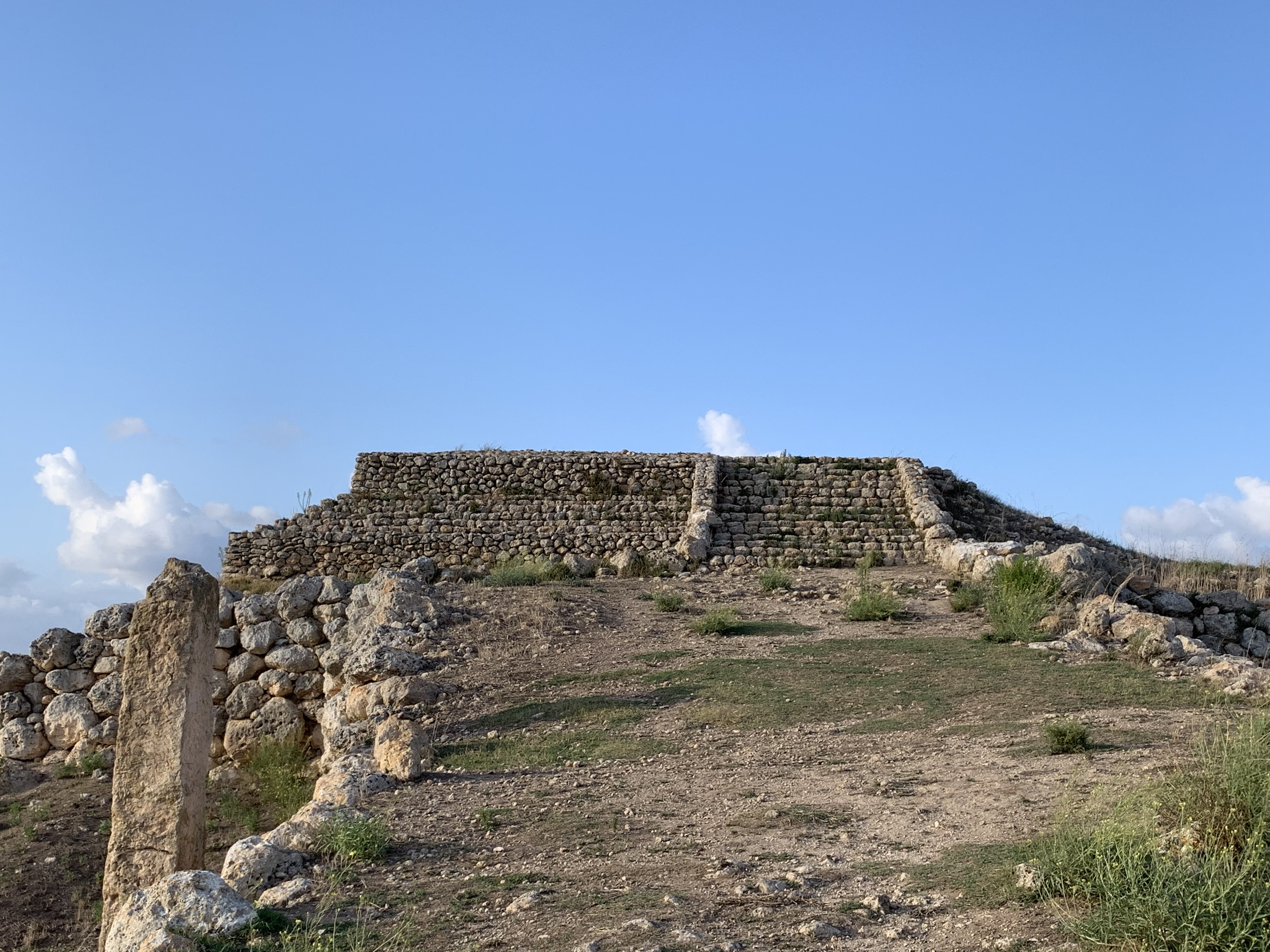
- View from the base

- Location in Sardinia, Italy
- 40°47′28″N 8°26′56″E
- Type: Monument
- Cultures: Ozieri, Abealzu-Filigosa
- Location: Sassari, Italy

History
- Built: c. 3800 BC
- Abandoned: c. 1800 BC

Site notes
- Discovered: 1954
- Condition: reconstructed
- Management: I Beni Culturali della Sardegna
- Public access: yes
- Website: Sassari, Tempio-altare di Monte d'Accoddi (in Italian)

Monte d'Accoddi is a Neolithic archaeological site in northern Sardinia, located in the territory of Sassari, Italy. The site consists of a massive raised stone platform thought to have been an altar. It was constructed by the Ozieri culture or earlier, with the oldest parts dated to around 4000–3650 BC.

== History ==
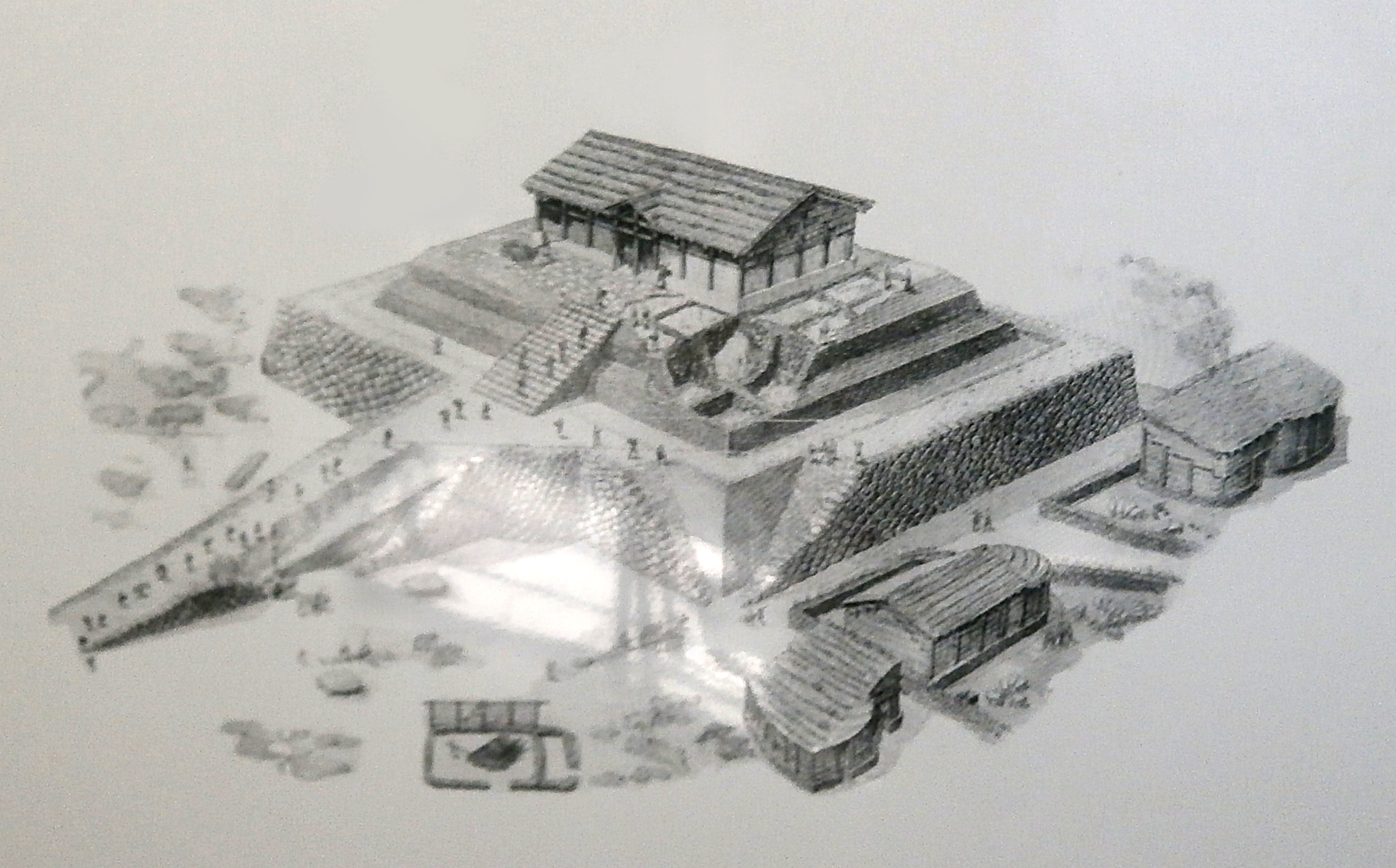
Monte d'Accoddi, reconstruction, c. 3500–3000 BC

The site was discovered in 1954 in a field owned by the Segni family. The original structure was built by the Ozieri culture or earlier c. 4000–3650 BC and has a base of 27 m by 27 m and probably reached a height of 5.5 m. It culminated in a platform of about 12.5 m by 7.2 m, accessible via a ramp. No chambers or entrances to the mound have been found, leading to the presumption it was an altar, a temple or a step pyramid. It may have also served an observational function, as its square plan is coordinated with the cardinal points of the compass.

Between 3500 and 3000 BC, the remains of the original structure were completely covered with a layered mixture of earth and stone, and large blocks of limestone were then applied to establish a second platform, forming a step pyramid (36 m × 29 m, about 10 m in height), accessible by means of a second ramp, 42 m long, built over the older one. This second temple resembles Mesopotamian ziggurats, and is attributed to the Sub-Ozieri period.

Archeological excavations from the Chalcolithic Abealzu-Filigosa layers indicate the Monte d'Accoddi was used for animal sacrifice, with the remains of sheep, cattle, and swine recovered in near equal proportions. It is among the earliest known sacrificial sites in Western Europe, providing insight into the development of ritual in prehistoric society, and earning it a designation as "the most singular cultic monument in the early Western Mediterranean".

Bell Beaker pottery appears at Monte d'Accoddi after c. 2500 BC. Finds include hemispheric bowls, cups, tripods, or tetrapods, and carenated bowls. Vessels were decorated in the 'pure Maritime style', as well as with more complex arrangements of triangles or zigzags.

The Monte d'Accoddi site appears to have been abandoned again around 1800 BC, at the onset of the Nuragic age.

Based on the evidence of architecture, ritual deposits and diagnostic pottery, G. and M. Webster argued, in 2017 & 2019, for the monument's status as a product of a migration event (probably exilic) initiated from Mesopotamia, during the first half of the 4th millennium BC.

== Surrounding area ==
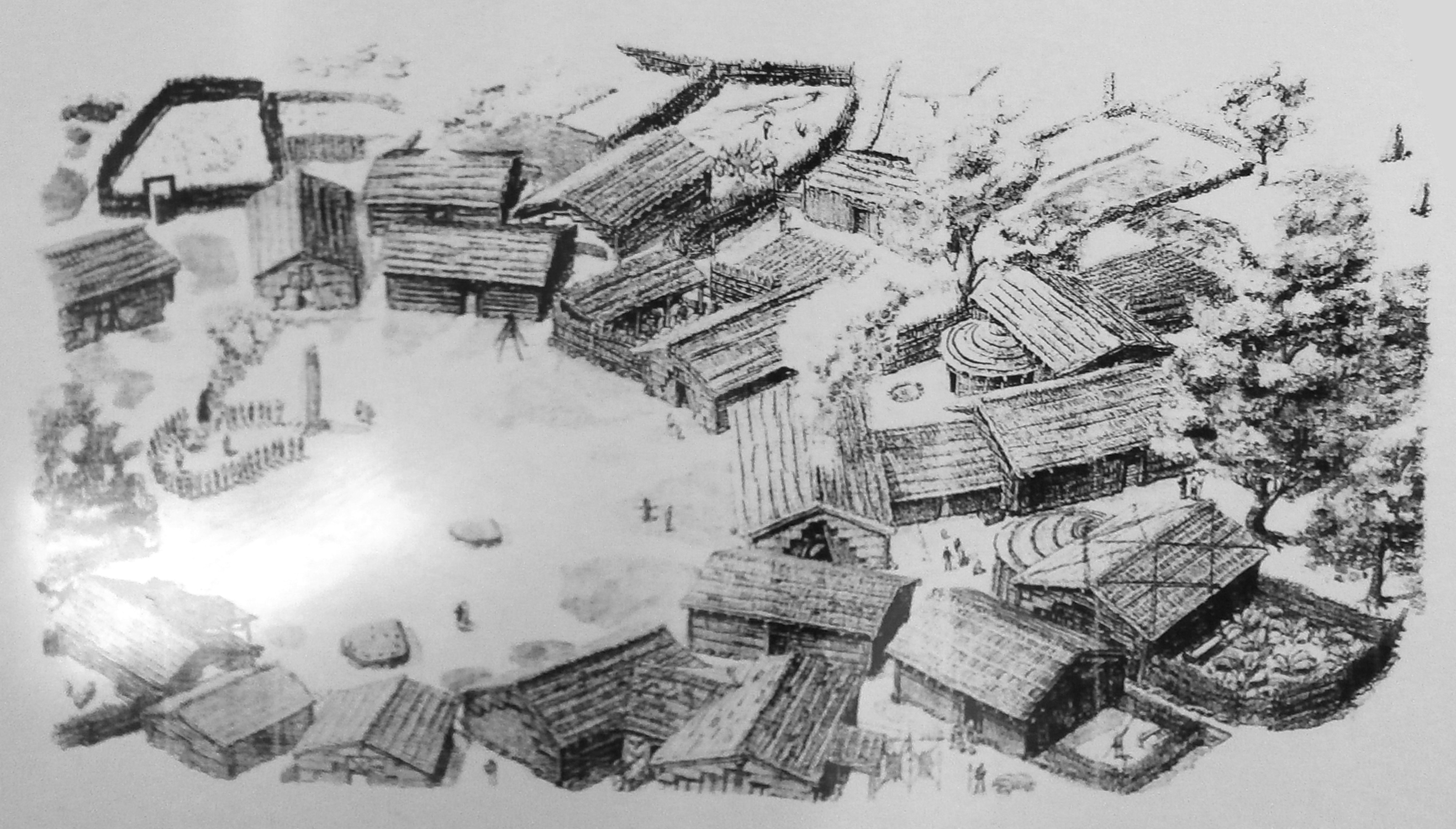
Monte d'Accoddi settlement, reconstruction

The surroundings of the Monte d'Accoddi have been excavated in the 1960s, and have provided the signs of a considerable sacred center. Near the south-eastern corner of the monument there is a dolmen, and across the ramp stands a considerable menhir, one of several standing stones which was formerly found in the vicinity. The foundations of several small structures (possibly residential) were excavated, and several mysterious carved stones. The most impressive of these is a large boulder carved into the shape of an egg and then cut through on a subtle curving three-dimensional line.

== Reconstruction ==
The monument was partially reconstructed during the 1980s. It is open to the public and accessible by the old route of SS131 highway, near the hamlet of Ottava. It is 14.9 km from Sassari. The bus from Sassari to Porto Torres stops nearby, but the stop is not in a very safe place. The opening times vary throughout the year.

== Gallery ==
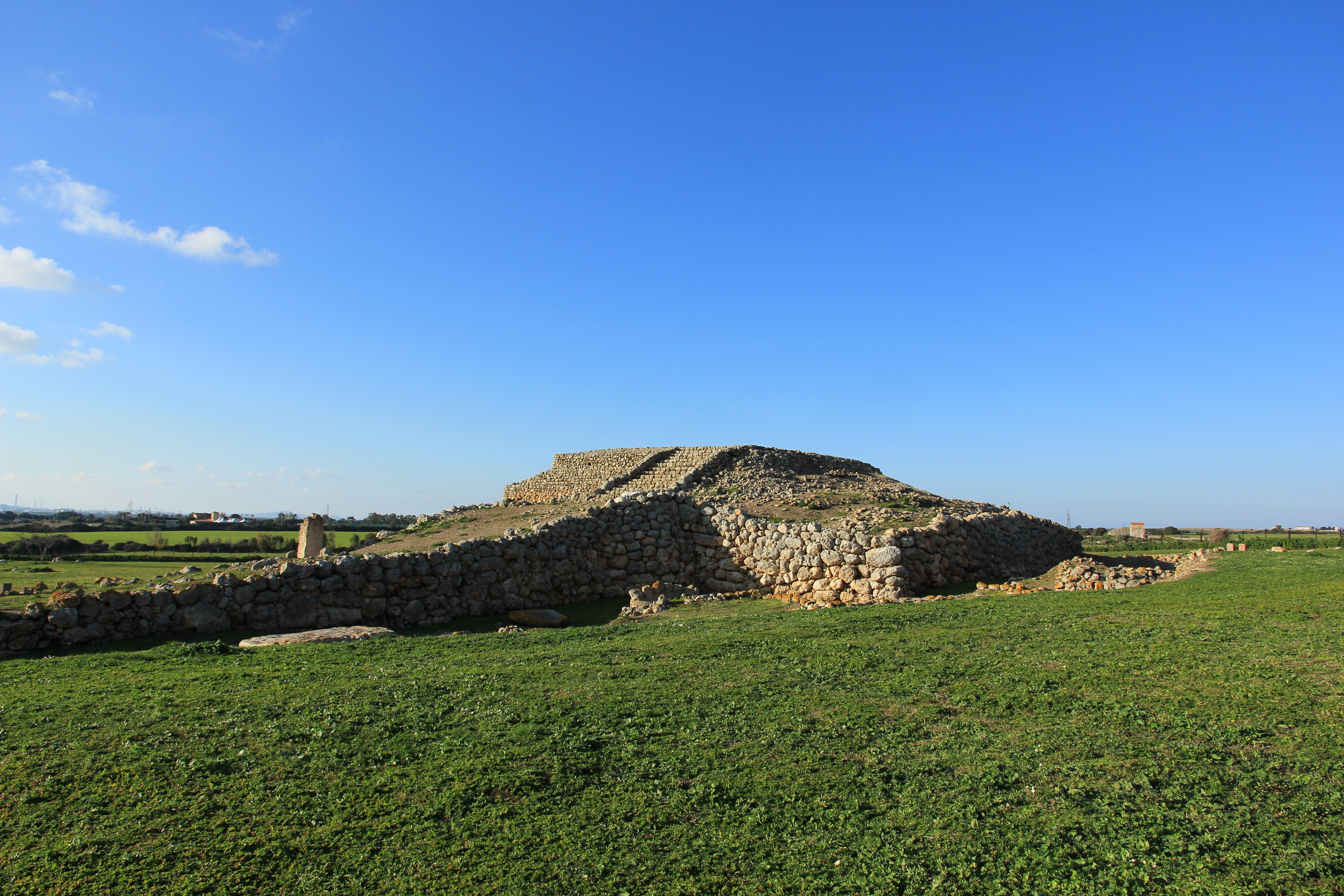
Monte d'Accoddi

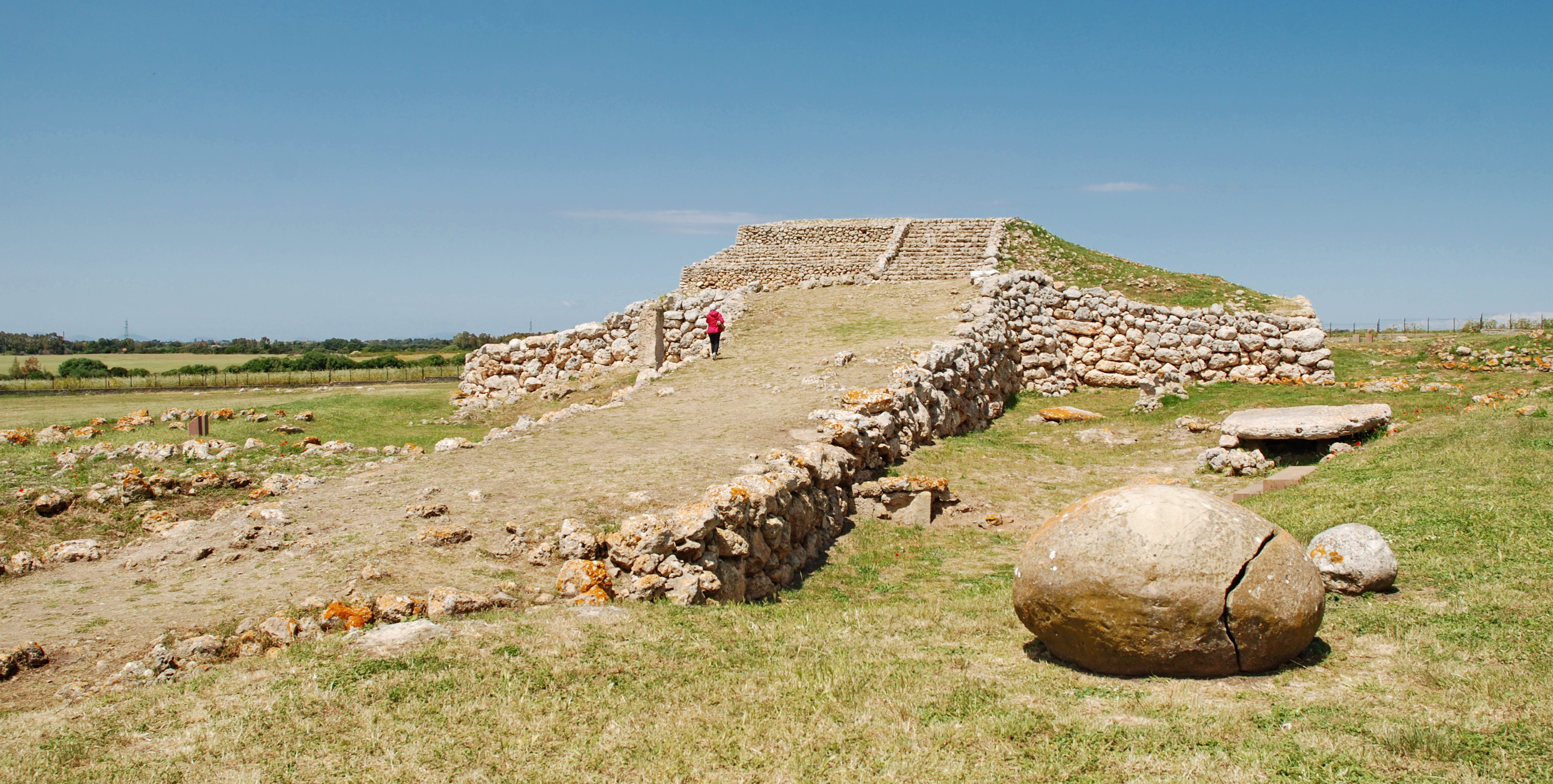
The dolmen and a carved boulder in the foreground

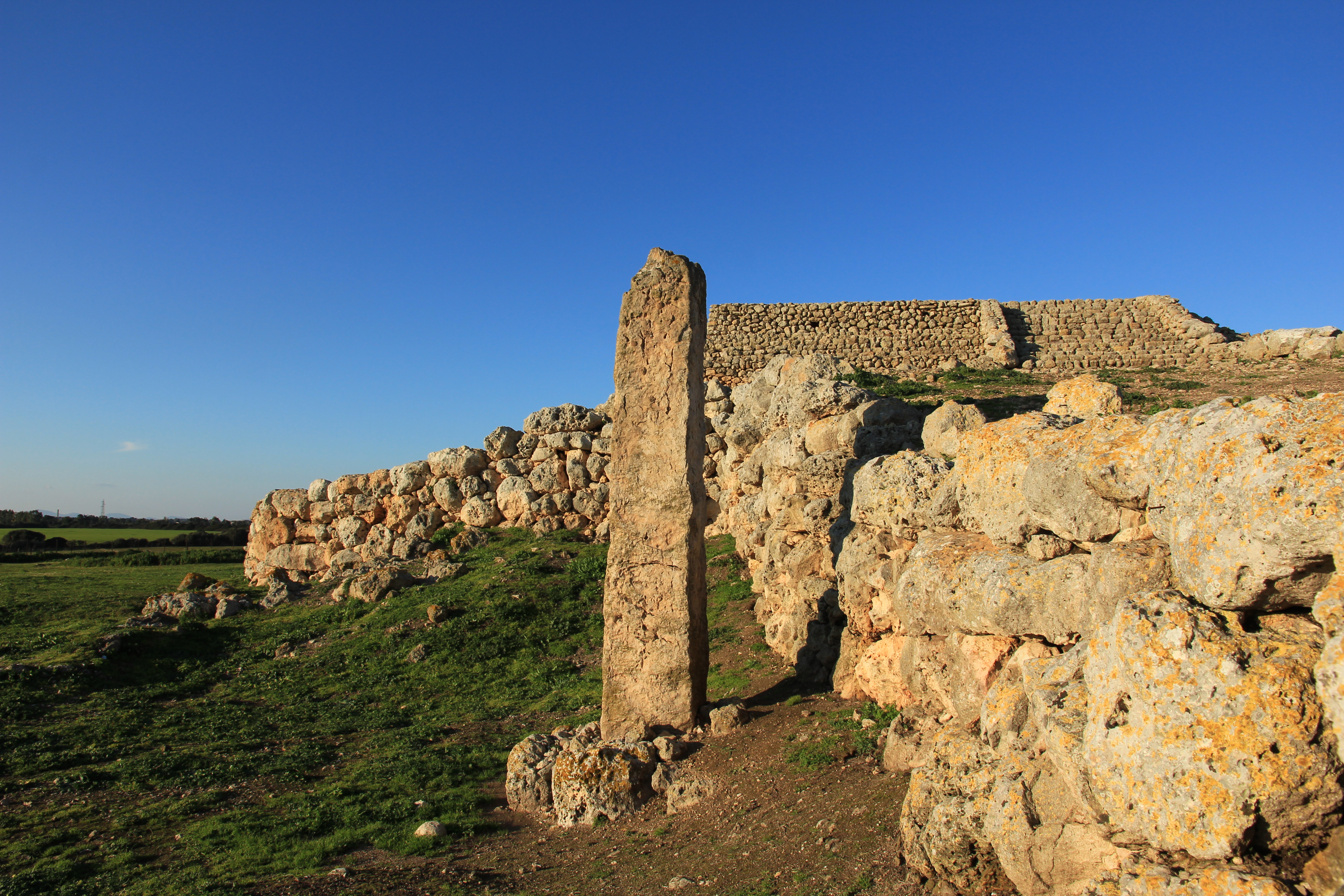
The menhir (standing stone)

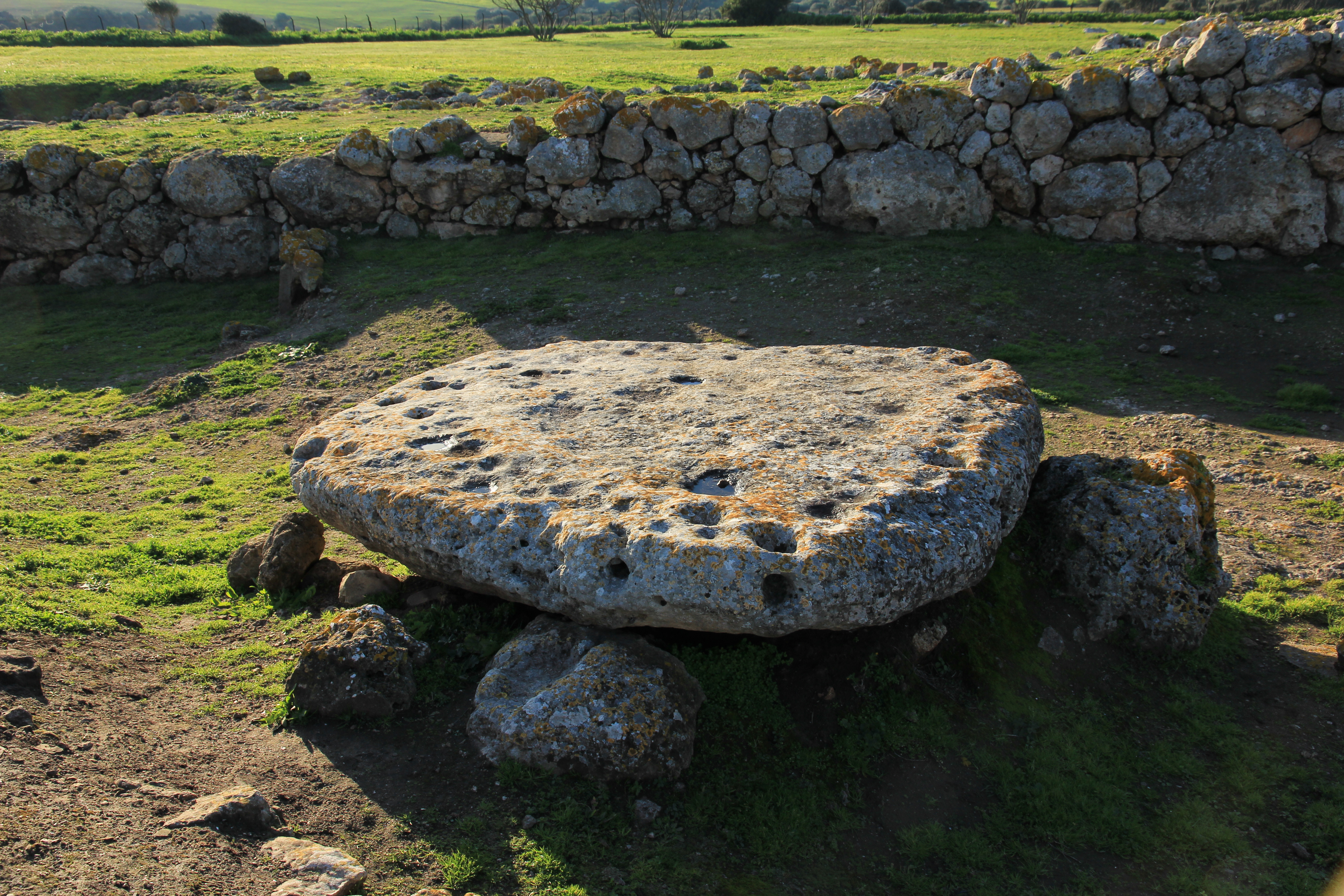
One of the altars

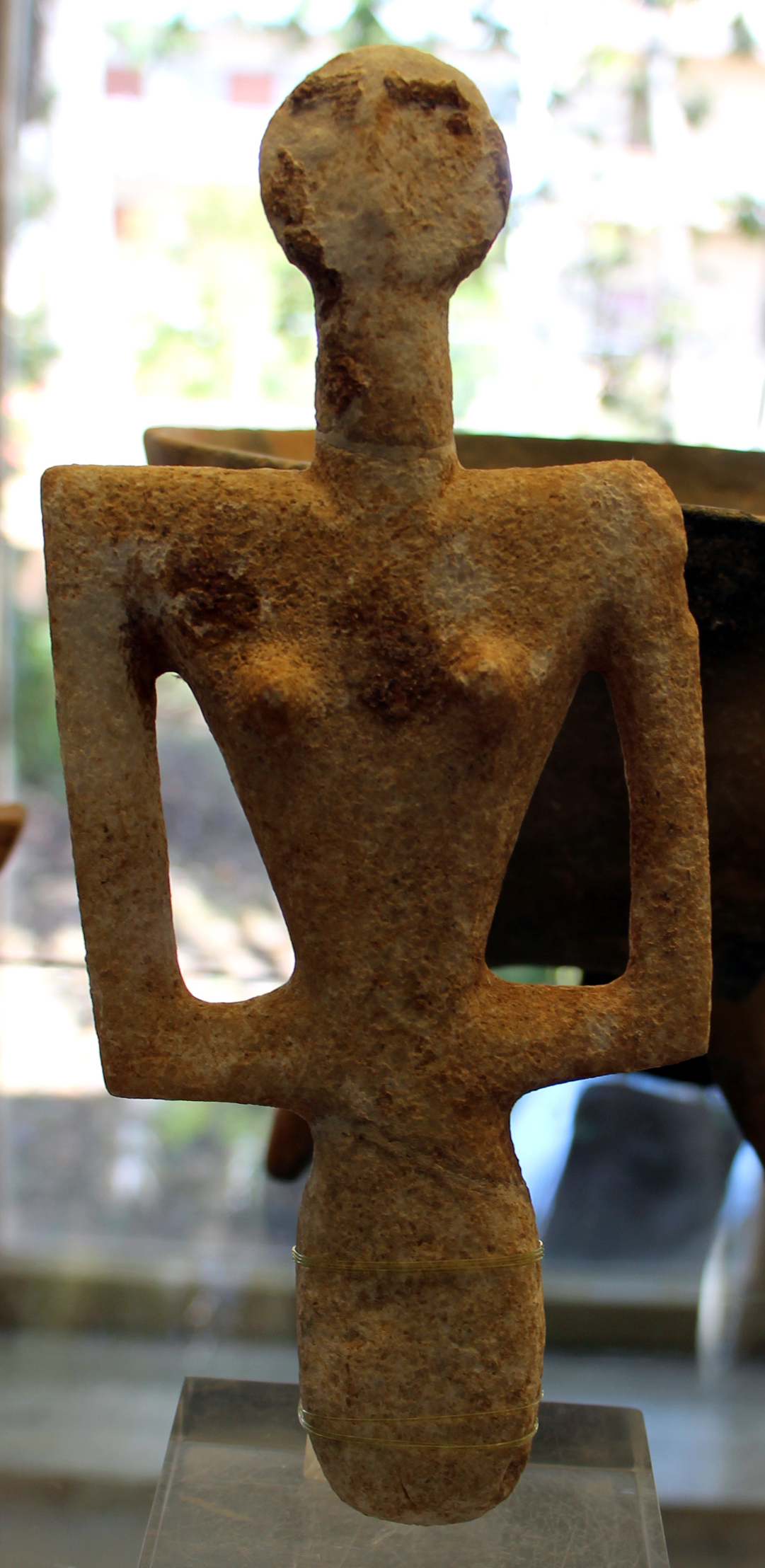
Female statuette recovered from the site, dated to 3200–2700 BC

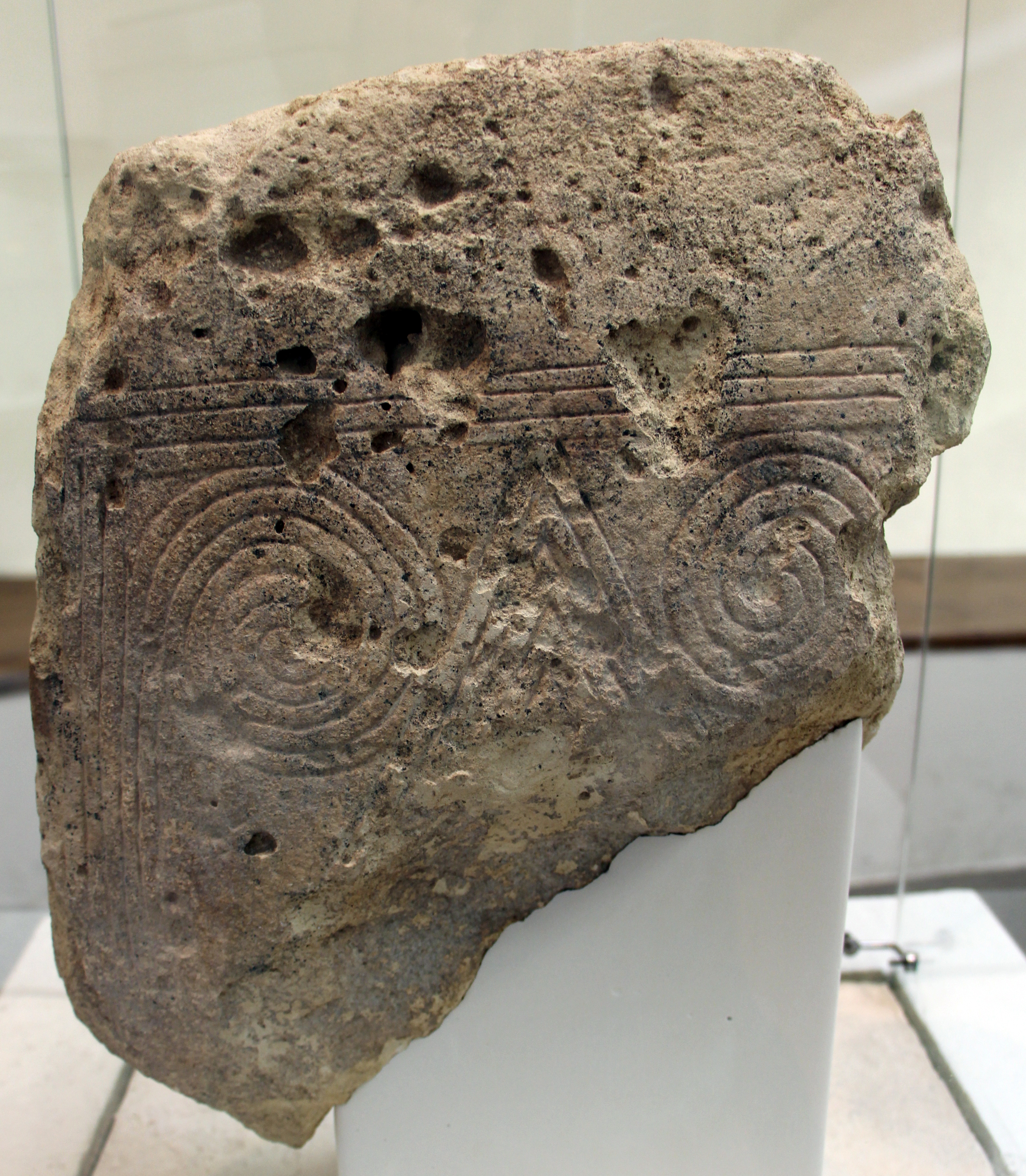
Ozieri stele, c. 3500–2700 BC, from Monte d'Accoddi

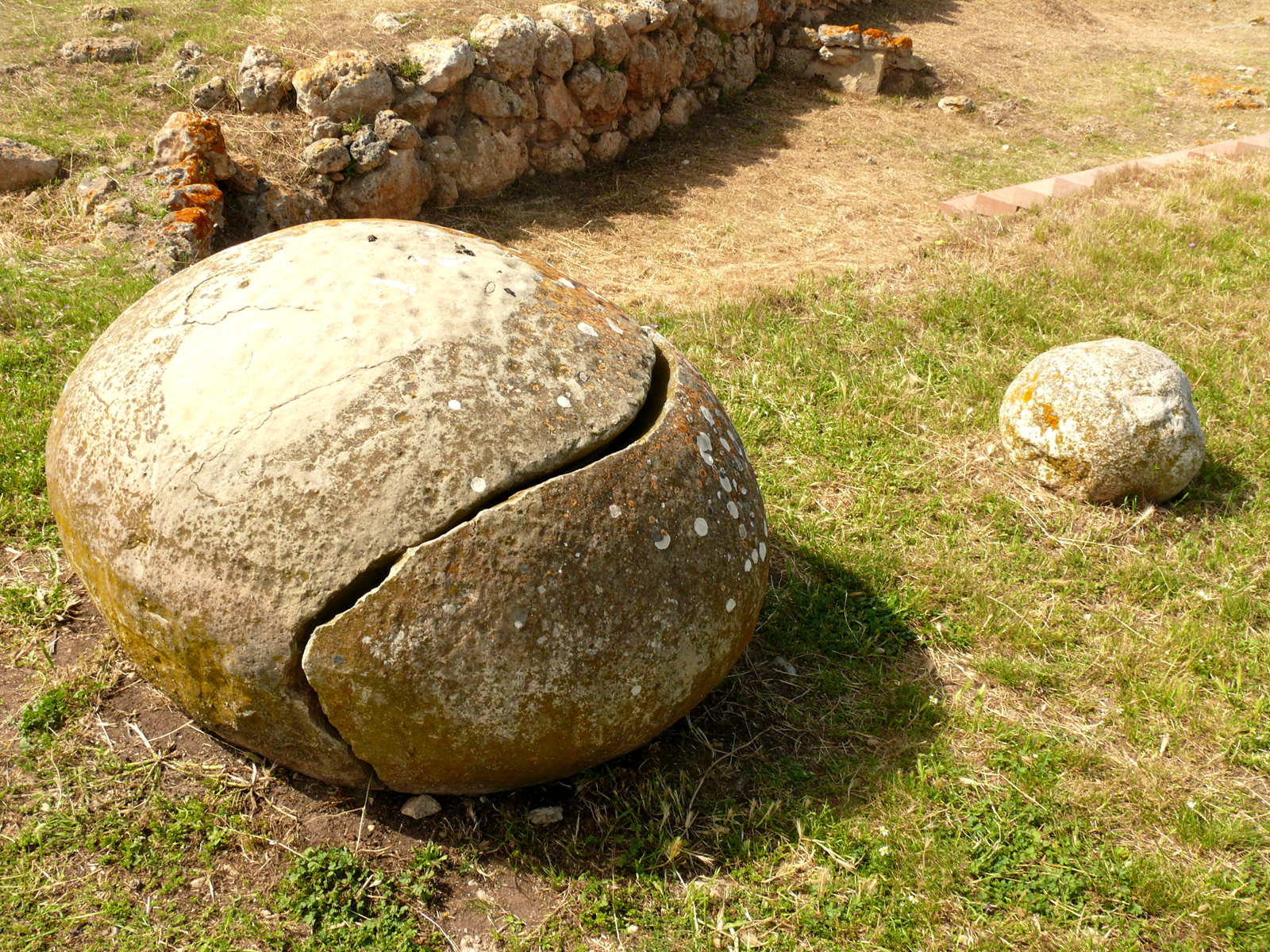
The carved boulder

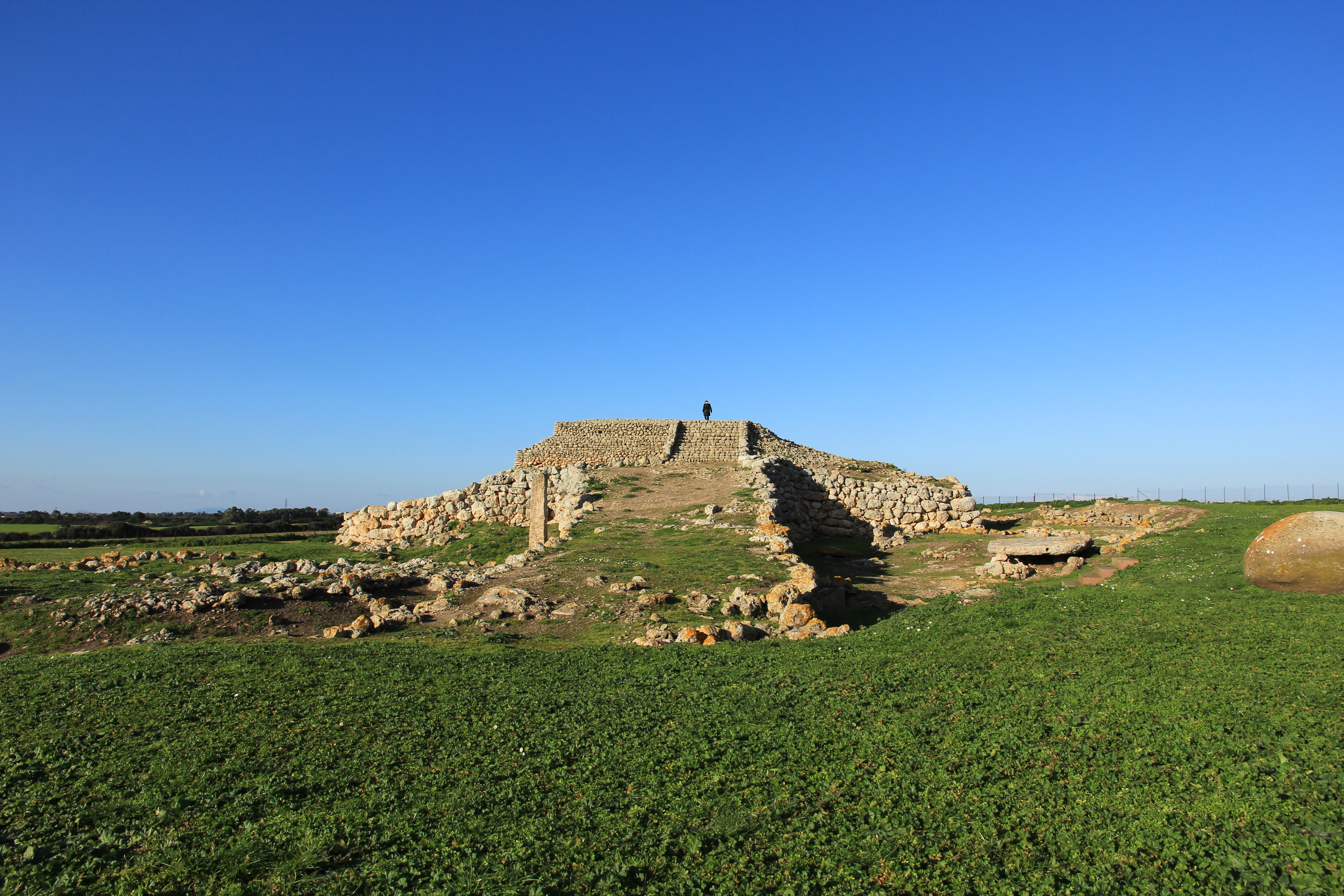

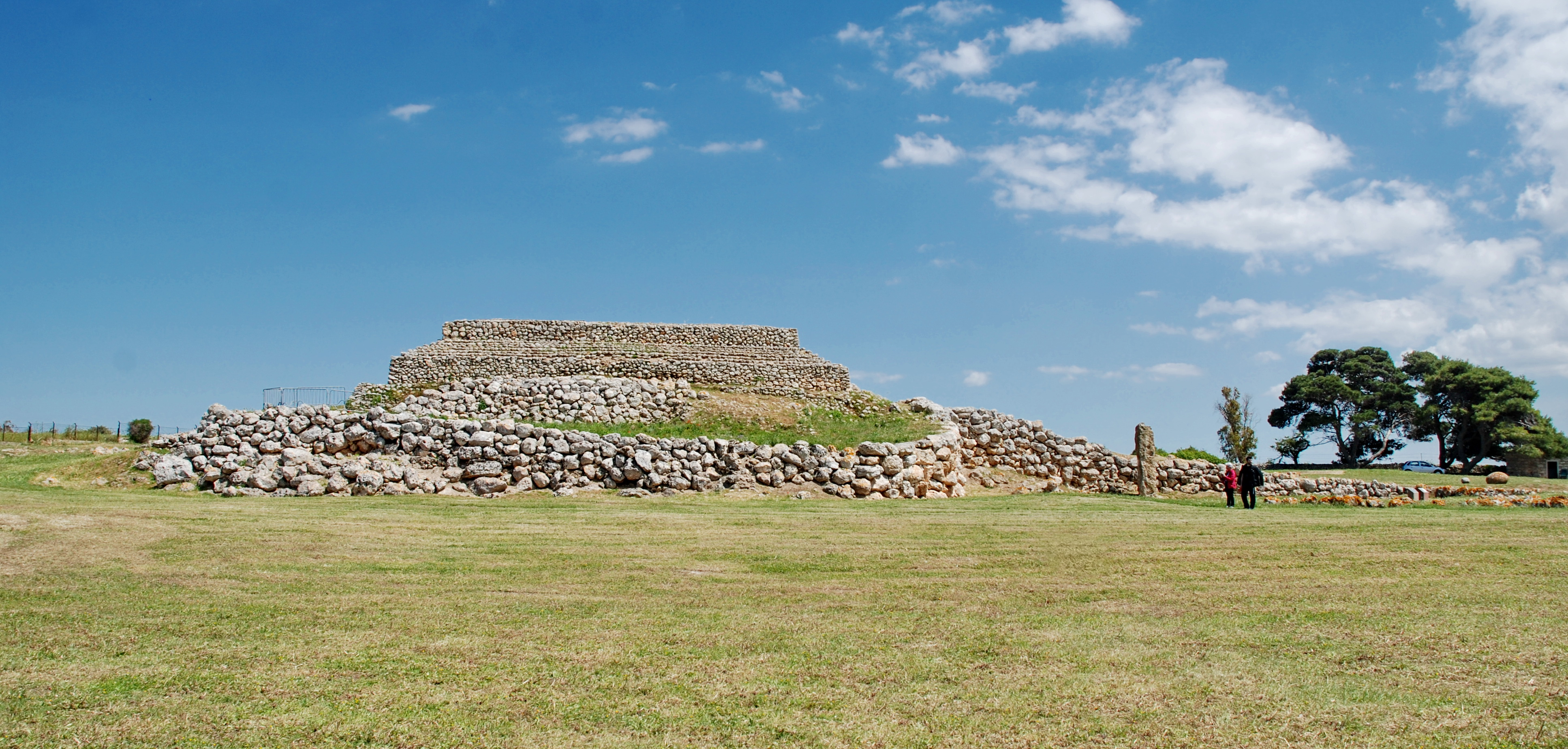

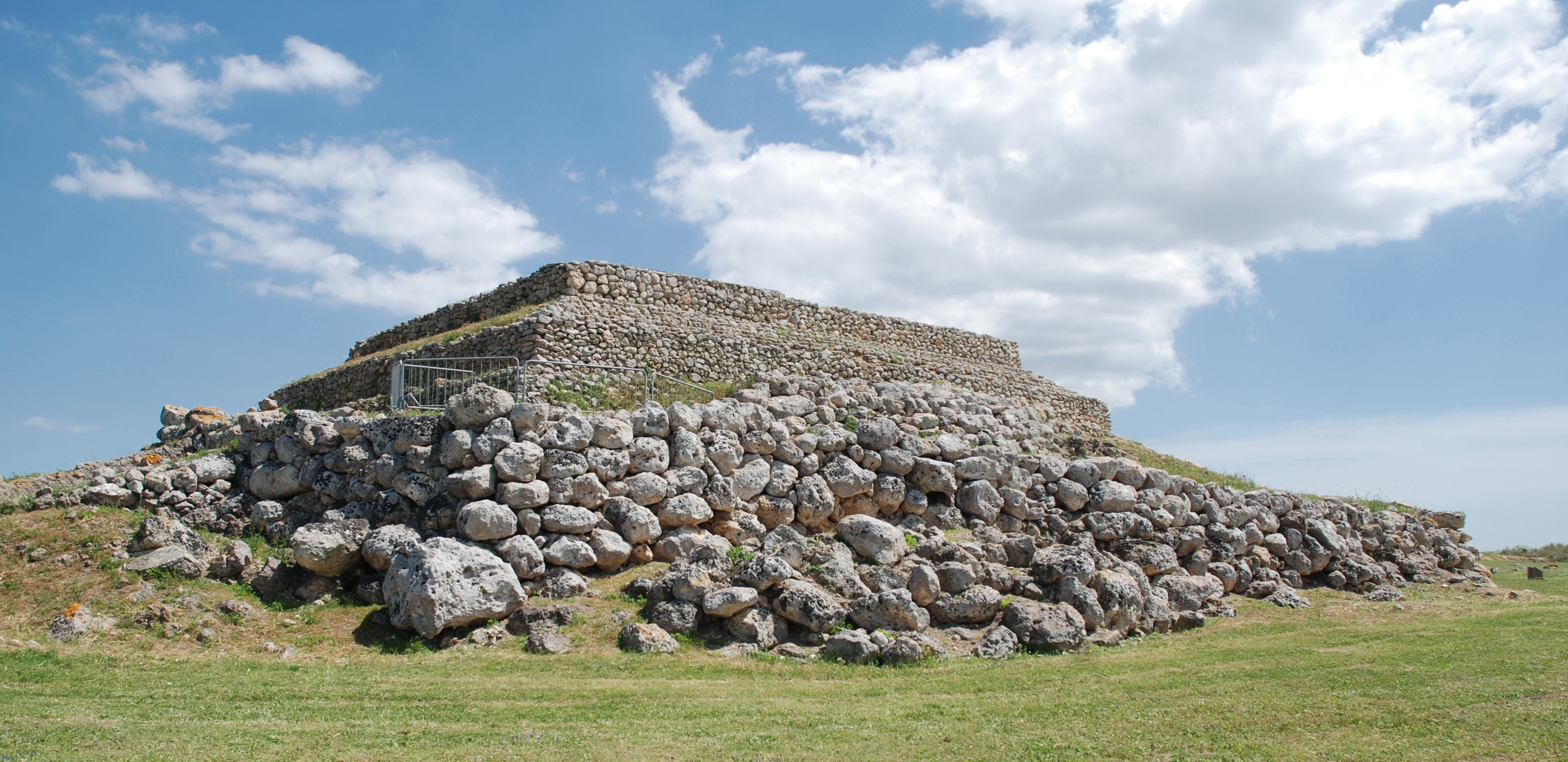

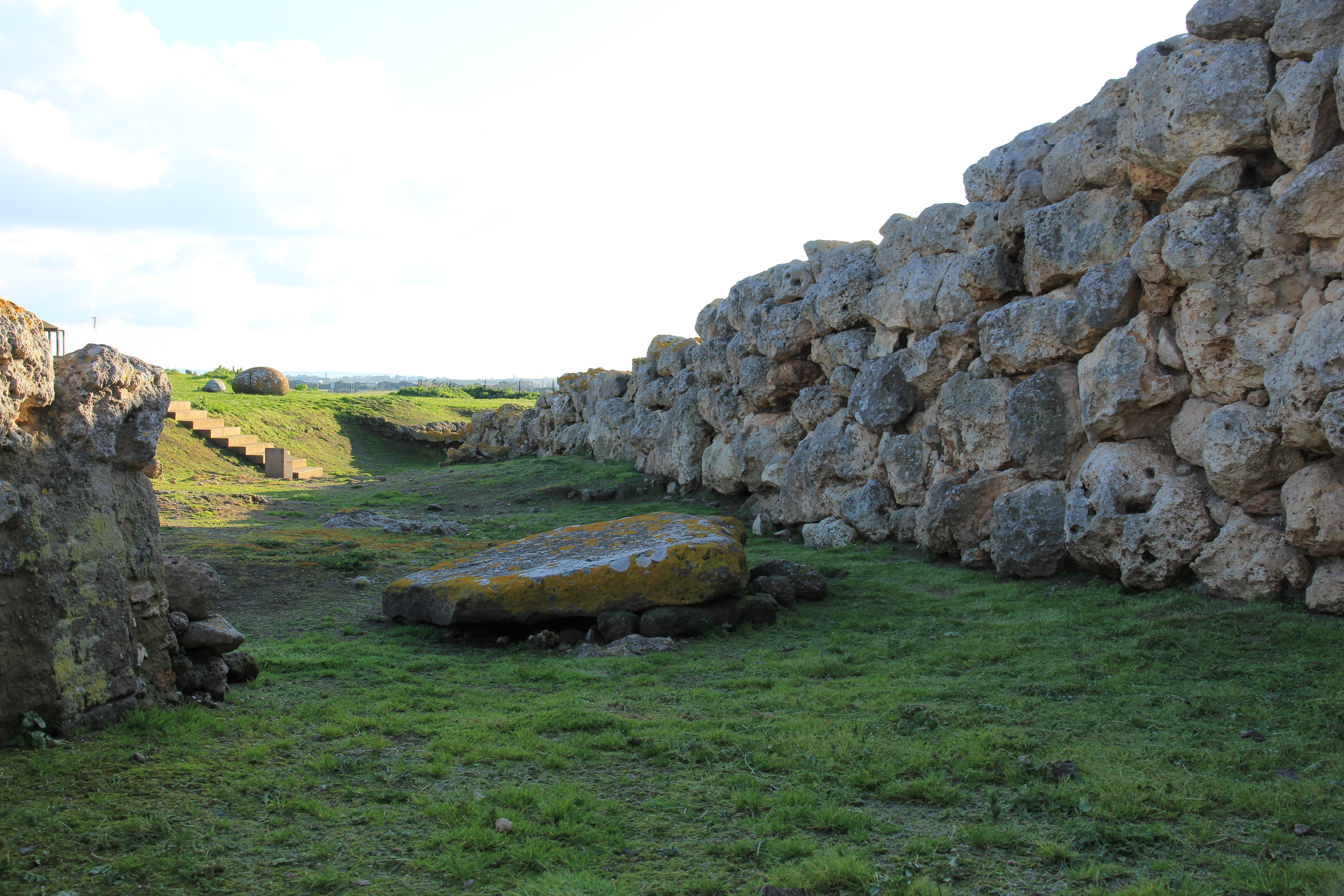

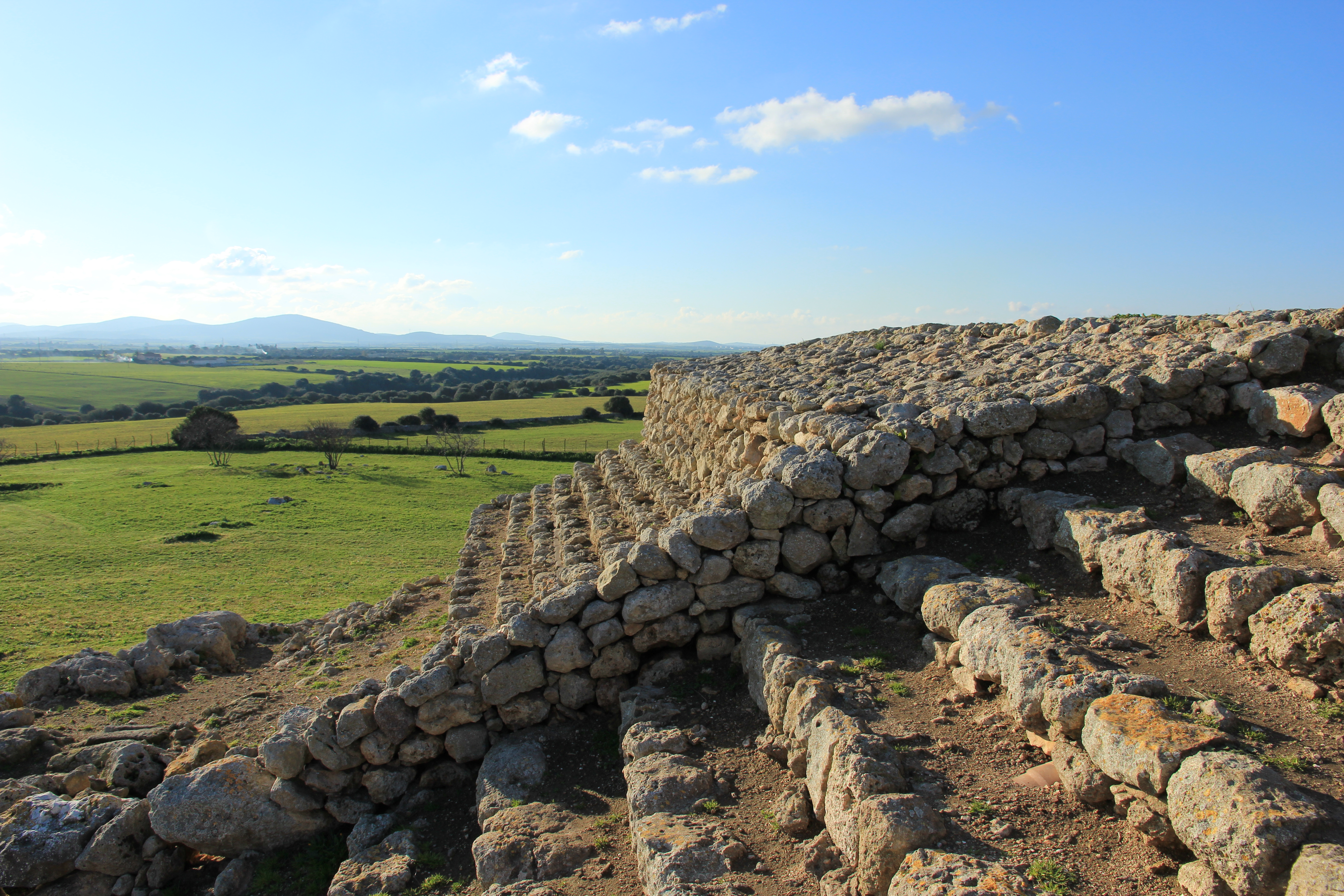

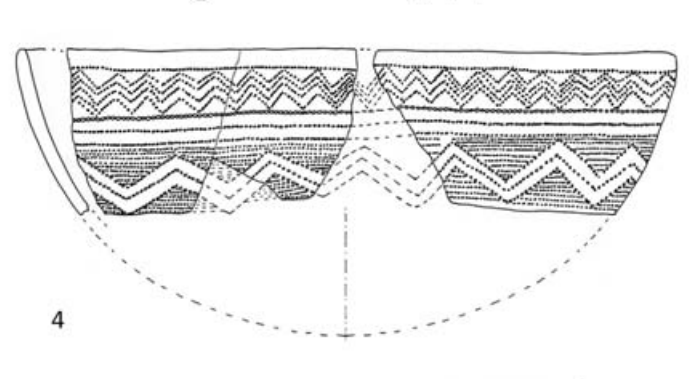
Bell Beaker pottery, c. 2500 BC.

== Sources ==
- Ercole Contu, Monte d'Accoddi (Sassari). Problematiche di studio e di ricerca di un singolare monumento preistorico, Oxford 1984.
- S. Tinè, S. Bafico, T. Mannoni, "Monte d'Accoddi e la Cultura di Ozieri", in La Cultura di Ozieri: problematiche e nuove acquisizioni, Ozieri 1989, pp. 19–36.
- Ercole Contu, "L'altare preistorico di Monte d'Accoddi" Sardegna Digital Library
- Contu, Ercole (2000). The Prehistoric Altar of Monte d'Accoddi (PDF). Sassari: Carlo Delfino editore. ISBN 88-7138-206-4. Archived from the original (PDF) on 2013-04-12.
- "Monte D'Accoddi: where in Italy you'll feel like you're in Mesopotamia"
- G. Webster and M. Webster 2017. Punctuated Insularity. The Archaeology of 4th and 3rd millennium Sardinia, Oxford: BAR International Series 2871; Webster, G. 2019. "Identifying Monte D'Accoddi, Sardinia's 4th-millennium ziggurat", Sardinia, Corsica et Baleares Antiquae XVII, 39-59.
