= Arzachena culture =

4000 B.C. Corsican and Sardinian culture

The Arzachena culture was a pre-Nuragic culture of the Late Neolithic Age occupying Gallura (the northeastern part of Sardinia) and part of southern Corsica from approximately the 4th to the 3rd millennium BC. It takes its name from the Sardinian town of Arzachena.

== Overview ==
Arzachena culture is best known for its megalithic structures, such as the characteristic "circular graves" and menhirs. Both the funerary architecture and the material culture show similarities with contemporary cultures in Catalonia, Languedoc, Provence and Corsica.

In contrast to the people of the contemporary Ozieri culture in the rest of Sardinia, the people of the Arzachena culture were organized in an aristocratic and individualistic society focused on pastoralism rather than arable farming. The Arzachena aristocracy buried their dead in megalithic monuments in the shape of a circle, with a central chamber containing a single individual, while on the rest of the island the Ozieri people buried their dead in collective hypogeum tombs called Domus de Janas.

Among the megalithic circles of Corsica, notable examples include those of Monte Revincu (Santo Pietro di Tenda), Ciutalaghia (Appietto), Monte Rotundu (Sotta), Tivolaggiu (Porto Vecchio) and Vascolacciu (Figari).

== Gallery ==
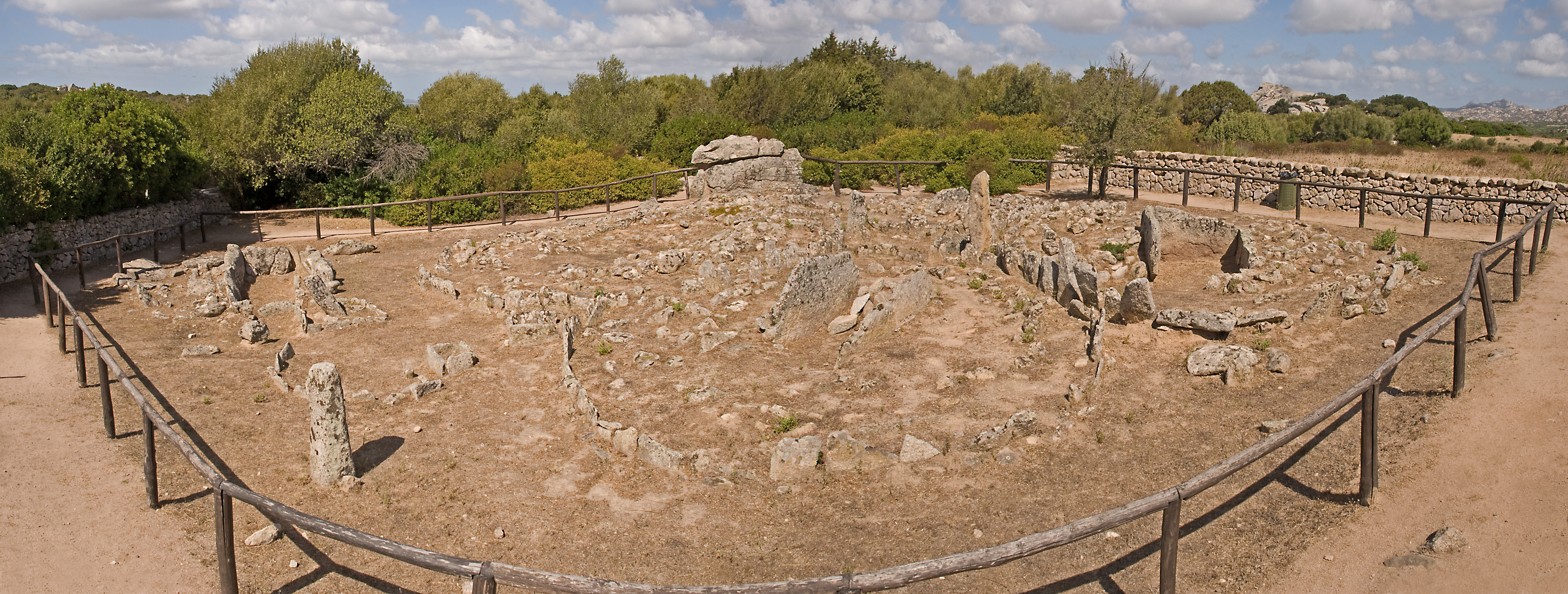
Circular graves of Li Muri at Arzachena

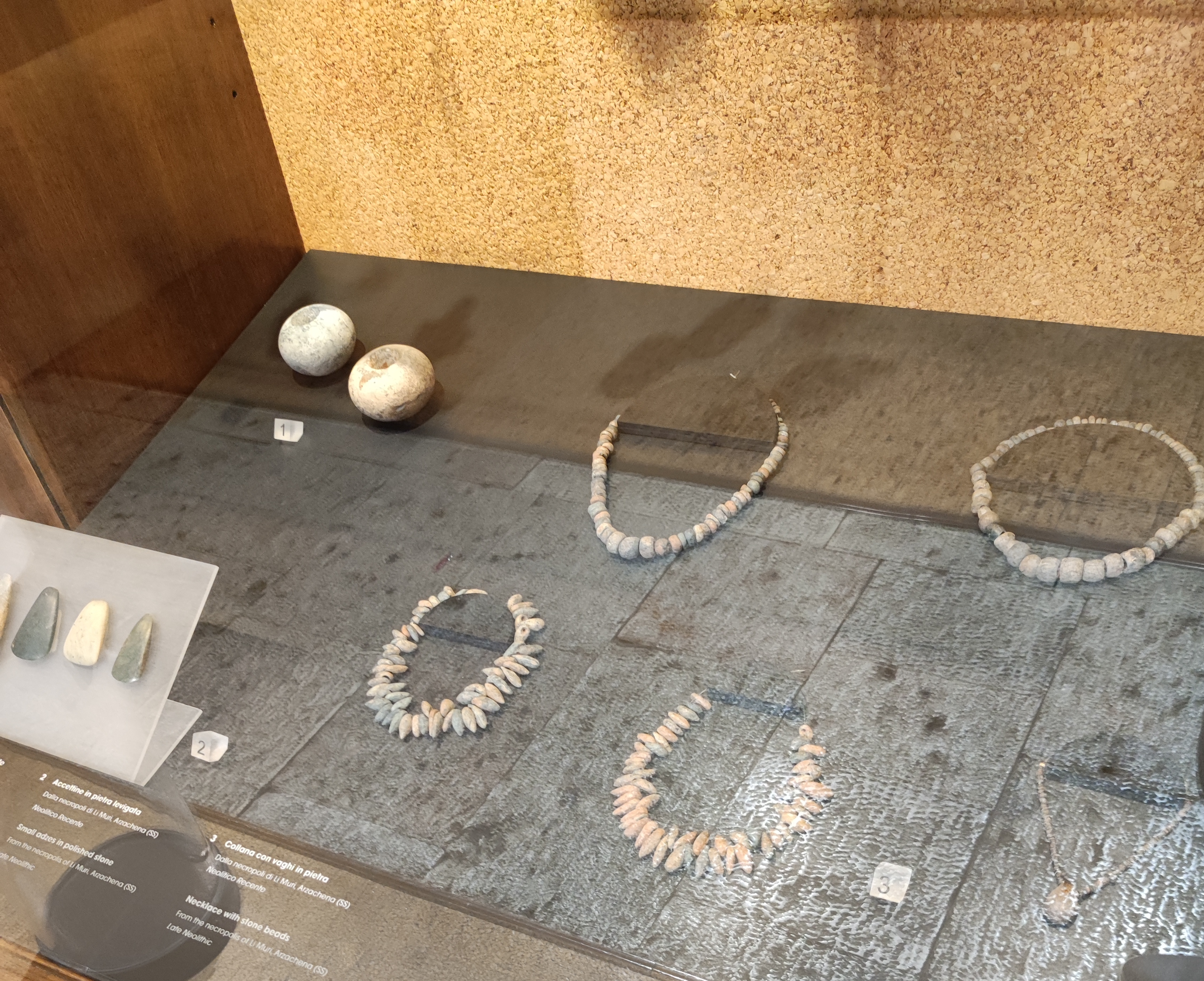
Finds from Li Muri

== See also ==
- Pre-Nuragic Sardinia
- Ozieri culture

== Bibliography ==
- AA.VV. La civiltà in Sardegna nei secoli - Torino - Edizioni ERI.
