= Necropolis of Is Loccis-Santus =

Archaeological site in Sardinia, Italy

- Necropolis of Is Loccis-Santus
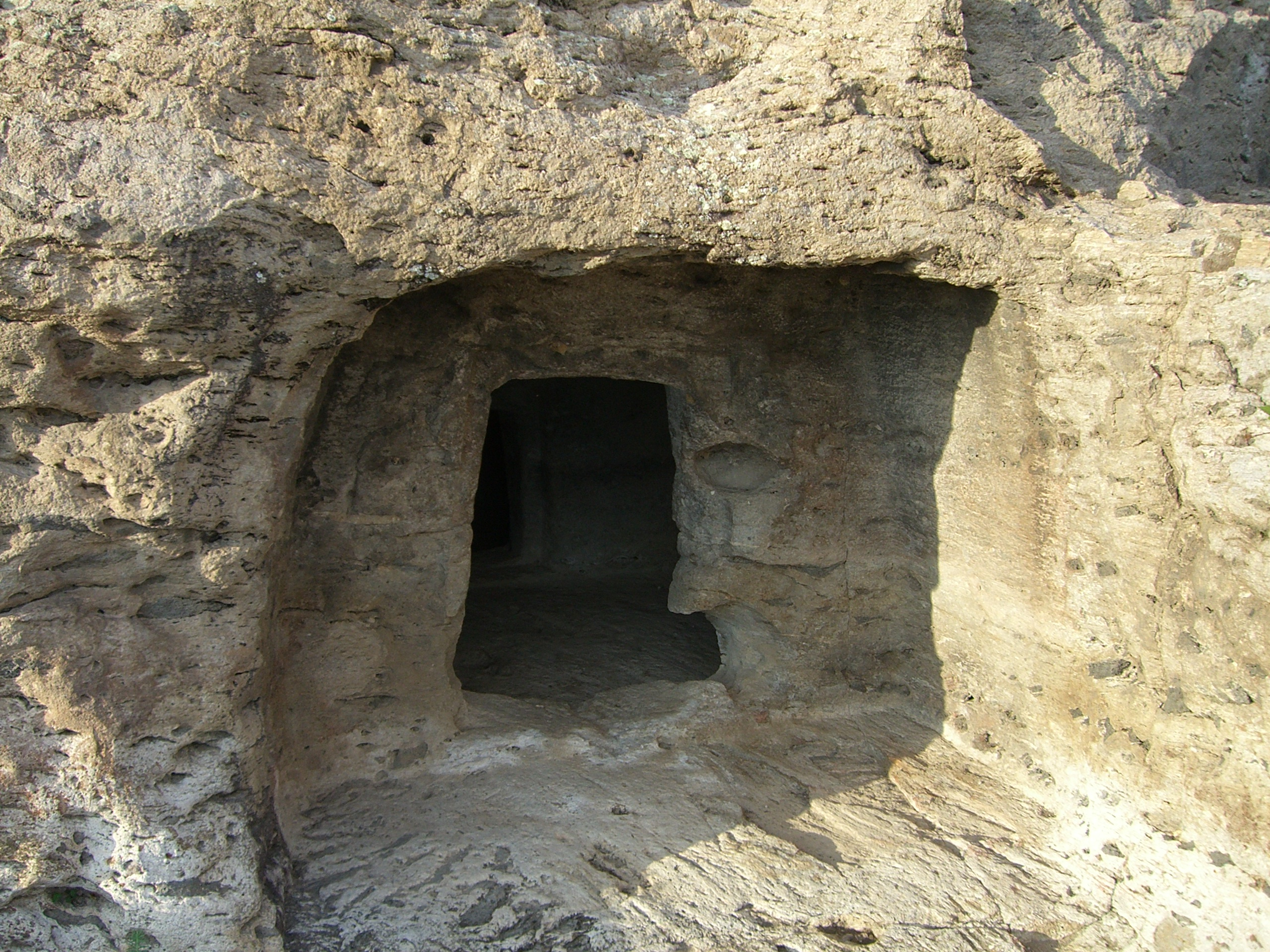

- Location within Italy
- 39°7′10.56″N 8°29′34.8″E
- Type: Necropolis
- Cultures: Pre-Nuragic Sardinia
- Location: San Giovanni Suergiu, Sardinia, Italy
- Region: Sardinia

Site notes
- Management: Soprintendenza per i Beni Archeologici per le province di Cagliari e Oristano
- Public access: Yes

The necropolis of Is Loccis-Santus is an archaeological site located in the municipality of San Giovanni Suergiu, Sardinia, Italy.

Dated to the 4th–3rd millennium BC and used until the early centuries of the 2nd millennium BC, consists of thirteen Domus de janas. The artefacts found inside the tombs, mostly ceramics and other grave goods, are attributable to the Ozieri culture, Abealzu-Filigosa culture, Monte Claro culture, the Bell Beaker and Bonnanaro culture and are now exposed in the Villa Sulcis museum of Carbonia.

On top of the hill where the necropolis is located there is a monotower nuraghe, built in the Nuragic era, and some buildings dating back to World War II.

== Gallery ==
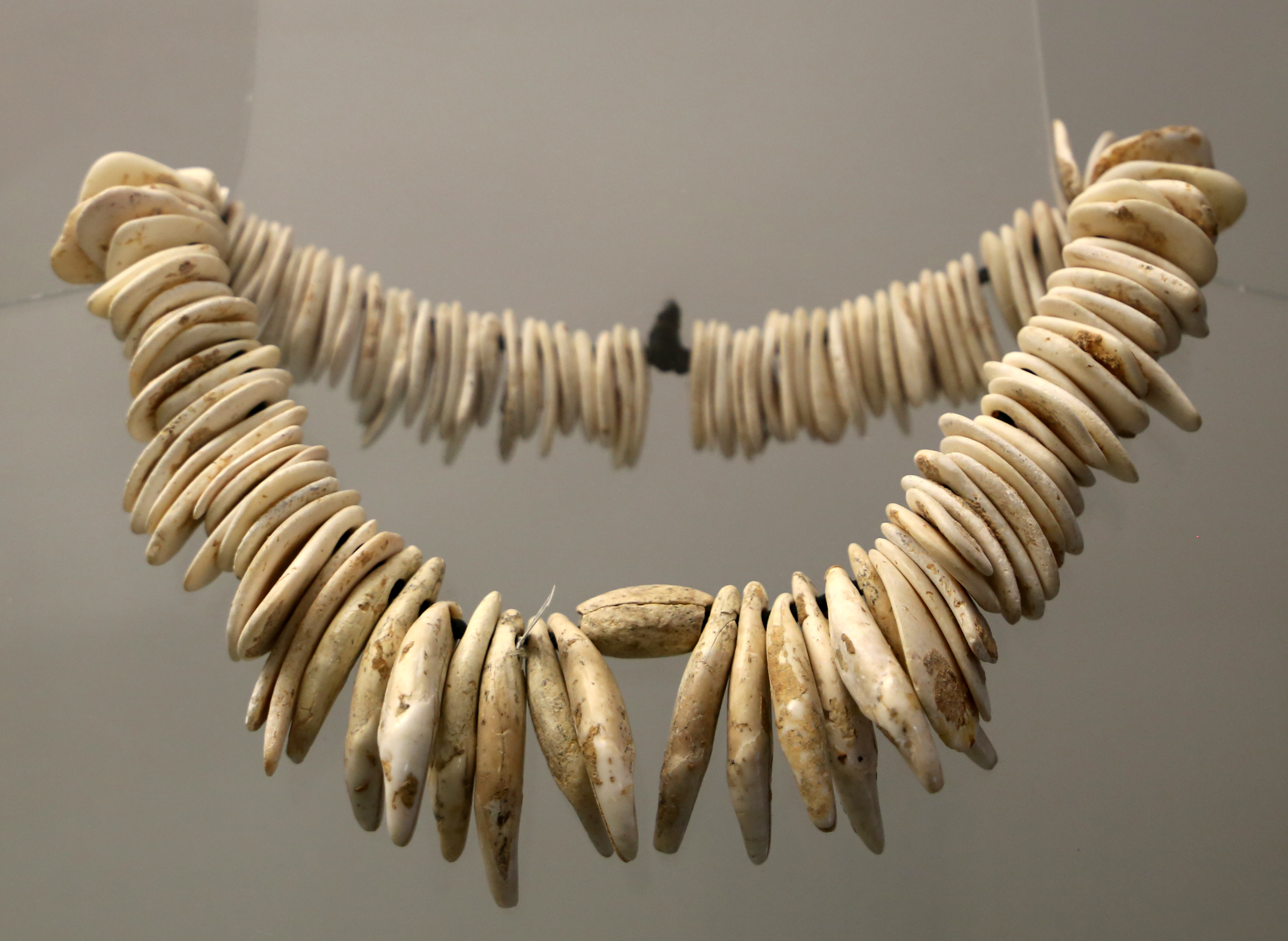
Necklace, Bell Beaker culture

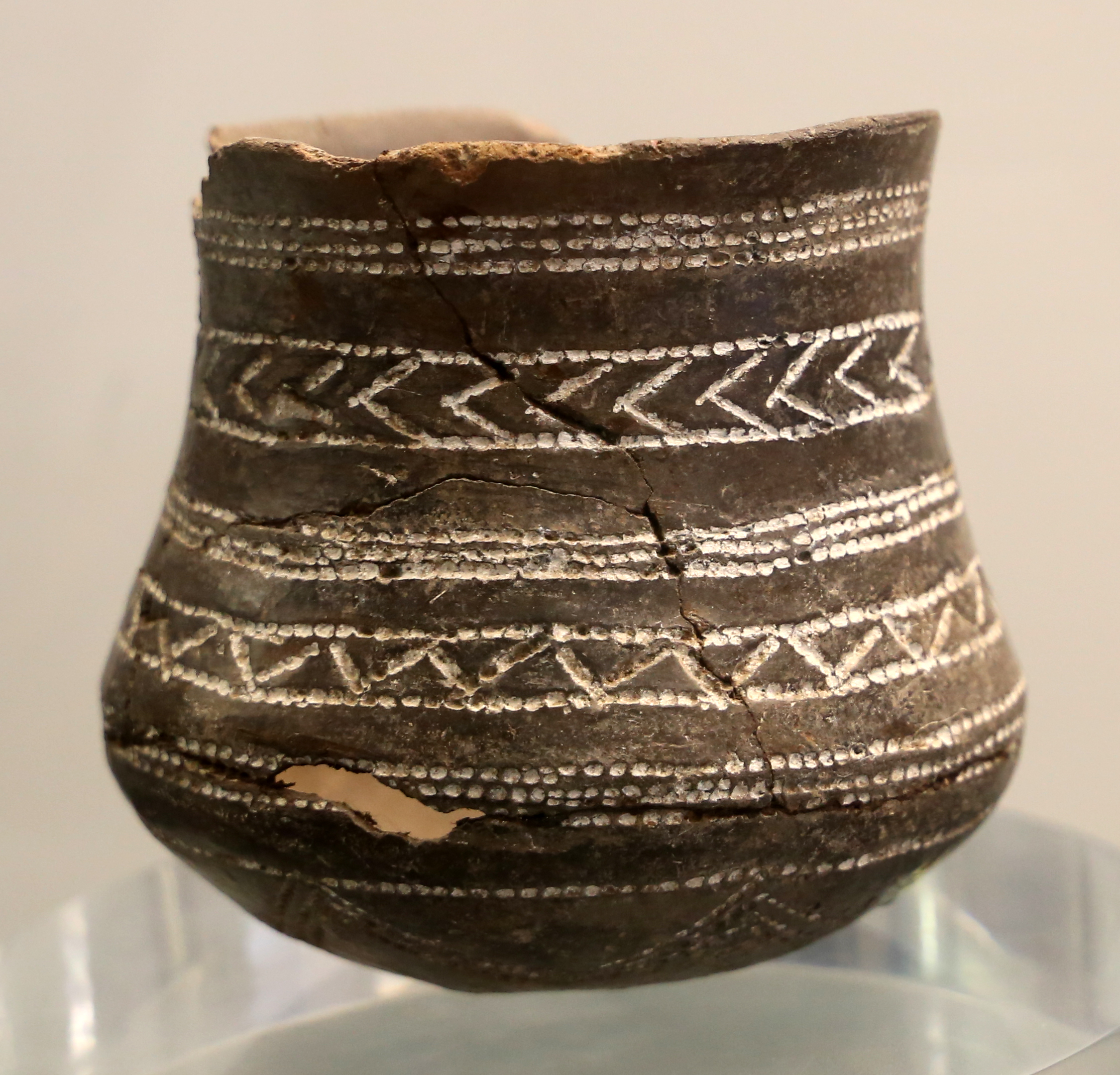
Bell Beaker

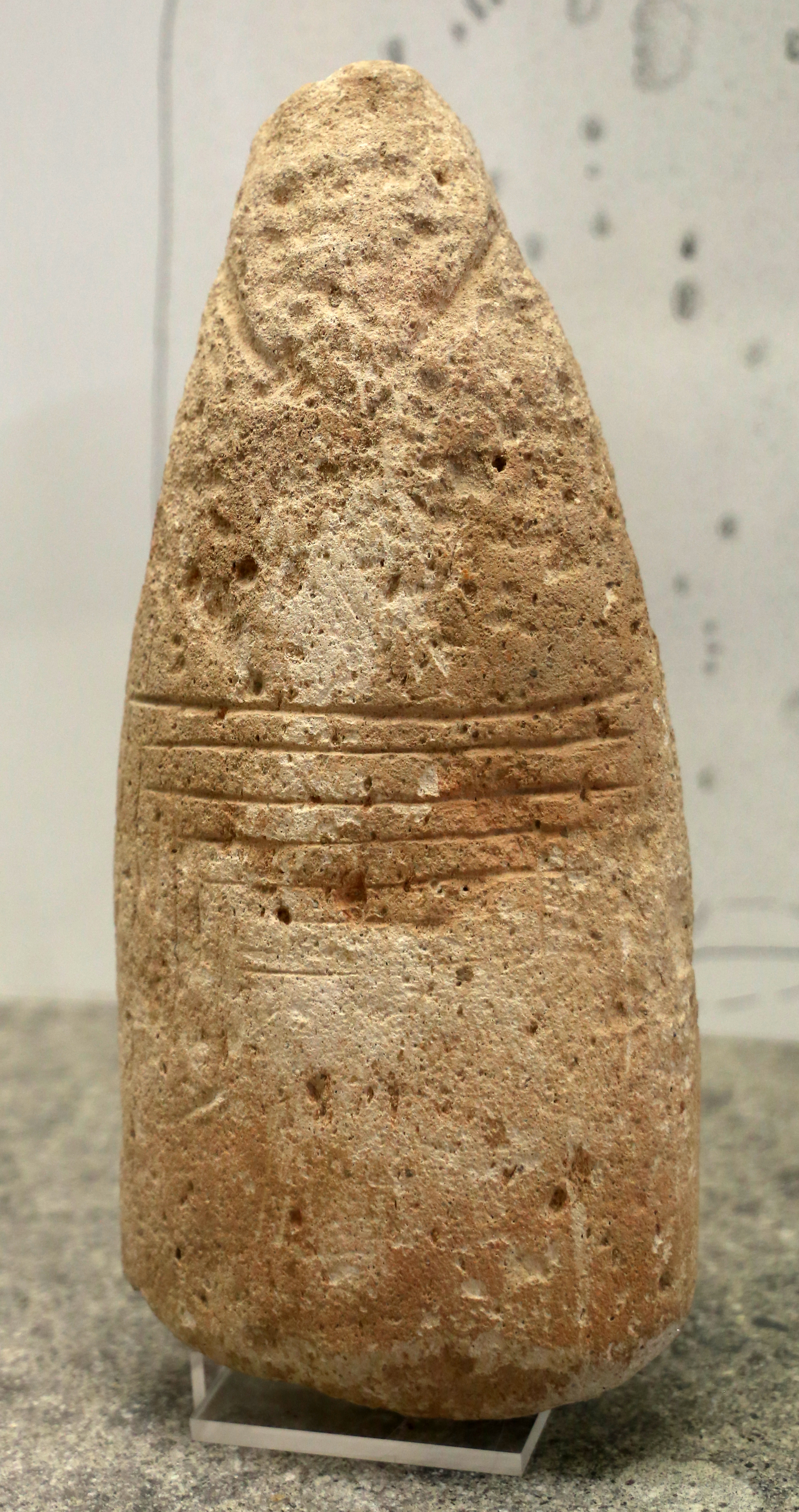
Idol, Abealzu-Filigosa culture

== Bibliography ==
- Enrico Atzeni, La "cultura del vaso campaniforme" nella necropoli di Locci-Santus (San Giovanni Suergiu), in Carbonia e il Sulcis: archeologia e territorio, Oristano, S'Alvure, 1995, pp. 119–143;
- Giovanni Lilliu, La civiltà dei Sardi dal paleolitico all'età dei nuraghi, Turin, Nuova ERI, 1988, pp. 161, 276, 432;
- Giovanni Lilliu, Preistoria e protostoria del Sulcis, in Carbonia e il Sulcis: archeologia e territorio, a cura di V. Santoni, Oristano, S'Alvure, 1995, pp. 13–50.
