= Ozieri culture =

Prehistoric culture on Sardinia

The Ozieri culture (or San Michele culture) was a prehistoric pre-Nuragic culture, while older scholarship placed the Ozieri culture between 3200 and 2800 BCE. Modern radiocarbon dating and Bayesian chronological modeling have pushed its origins back by nearly a millennium. Current consensus places the classic Ozieri I phase between 4200 and 3400 cal. BCE, with the transitional Sub-Ozieri phase continuing down to 2800 BCE. The Ozieri was the culmination of the island's Neolithic culture and takes its name from the locality where early findings connected with it have been found, the cave of San Michele near Ozieri, in northern Sardinia. The Ozieri existed contemporaneously with the Arzachena culture, sharing some similarities, and its influence also extended to nearby Corsica.

== History ==
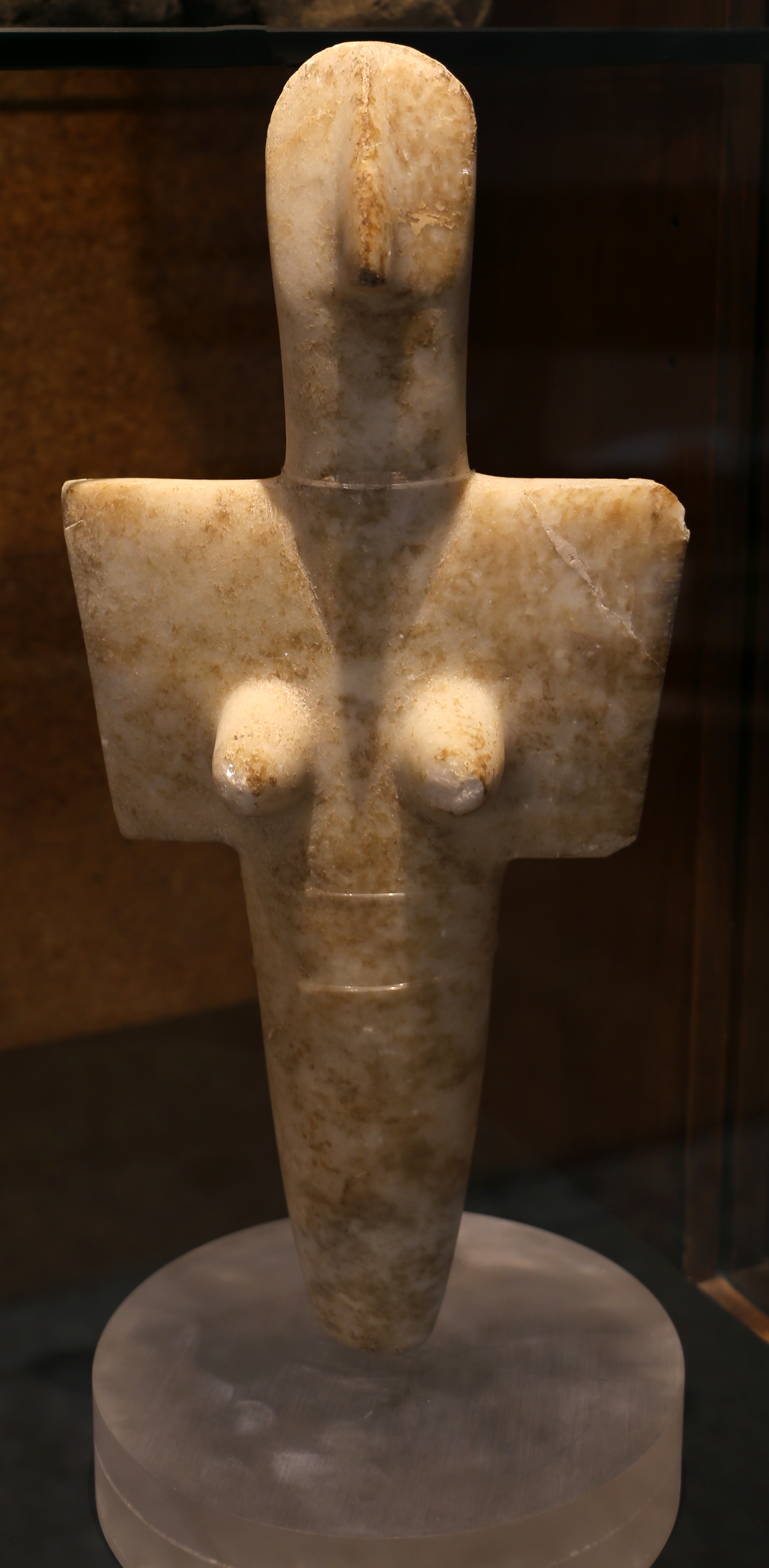
A statuette of the Mediterranean mother goddess, found at Senorbì.

Archaeological excavations have identified some 200 Ozieri sites, located both in plain and mountain areas, but with a preference for low ridges, and largely organized around an economy of Hunter-gatherers mixed with an initial presence of husbandry and agriculture. The settlements consisted of small stone huts, with a circular (rarely rectangular) wall supporting a wooden frame with a ceiling of boughs. One, near Sestu, consisted of 60 huts. Another, near Mogoro, included 267 huts, perhaps also erected on poles driven into the ground, with pavements composed of limestone slabs, basalt cobbles, or clay. Su Coddu, the largest known settlement, consisted of more complex structures and multiple room dwellings; located near Selargius, it has been partially built over by modern development, limiting the present understanding of its size. The finding of unique tools and objects in individual huts, and early evidence of metal-working, suggests the Ozieri culture was well organized and specialized.

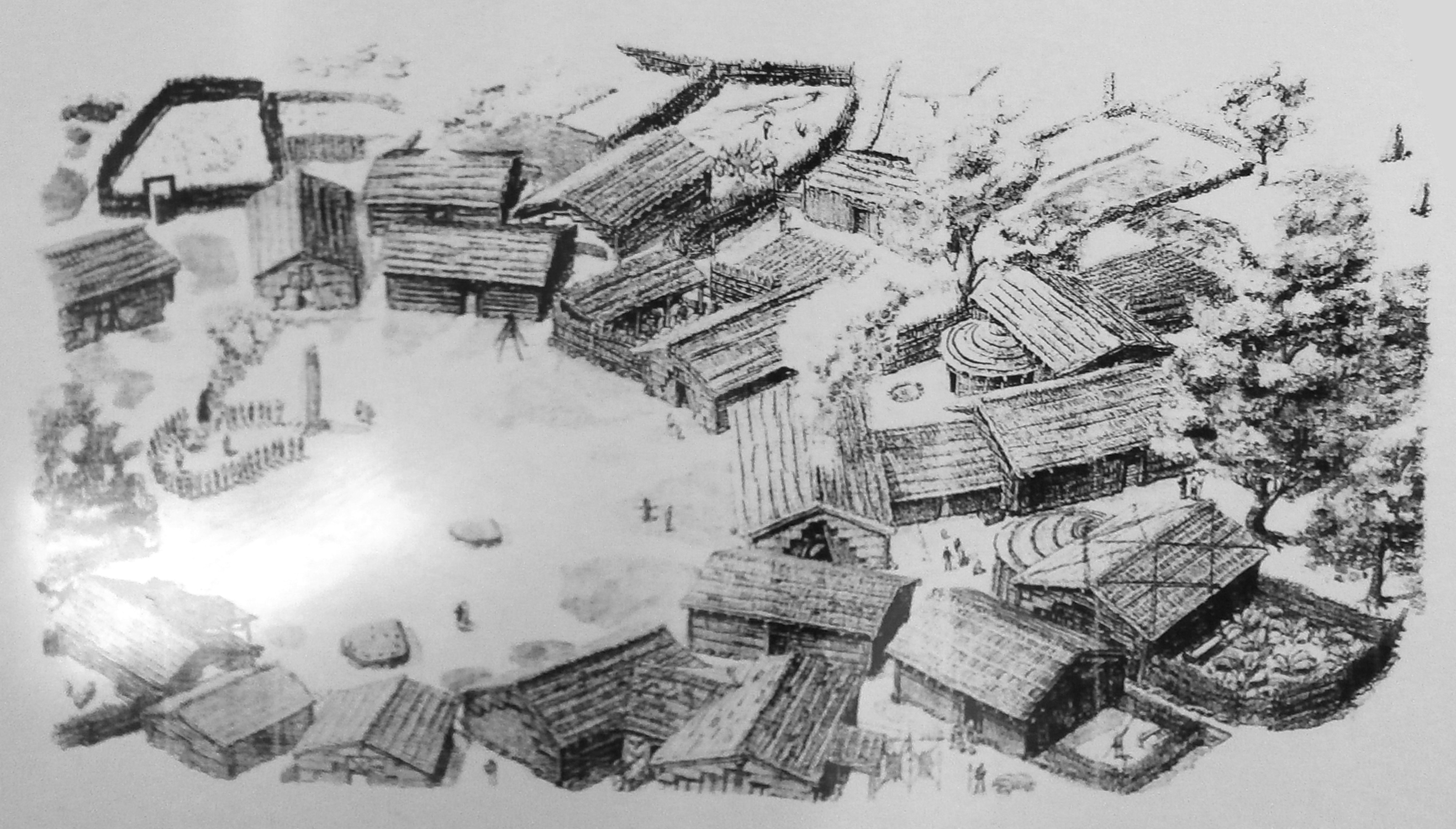
Ozieri village of Monte d'Accoddi

The villages had no walls, and findings of weapons in the tombs are scarce, indicating the Ozieri civilization was perhaps a peaceful one, very different from the later Nuragic civilization. The tombs consisted of rock-cut hypogeous structures that later became known as domus de janas, which were built underground or in rock faces, with the largest example being the Necropolis of Anghelu Ruju. Some tombs, of more monumental appearance, belonged perhaps to chiefs, in the fashion of those in Crete. The Ozieri burial practices differ from what is found in the region of Gallura (as a feature of the contemporaneous Arzachena culture), where the dead were interred in Megalithic circles.

The Ozieri produced finely made ceramic pottery with complex patterns, incisions, and surface decoration. Archaeological excavations held in 1914 and 1949 found fine worked vases with geometrical motifs carved in the clay and colored with red ochre. The oldest ones were still rather crude, while the more recent examples were more refined and slender. Such ceramics were a novelty for prehistoric Sardinia, since up to that point they had been considered typical of the Cyclades and Crete. The development of the Ozieri culture, therefore, probably stemmed from contacts with other eastern Mediterranean civilizations, in particular from the area of Neolithic Greece. The Ozieri culture appears to have been much involved in the obsidian trade, due to rich deposits on the island, which may have led to increased trading contact.

Figurines recovered indicate the Ozieri may have worshiped a mother goddess, with the most well known example being an alabaster statuette found at Ponto Ferro Tomb, Senorbì, and sharing some stylistic characteristics with later Cycladic figures. Female statuettes similar to those of the Ozieri culture have also been found in Malta. Bull horns were recovered from tombs and elsewhere, indicating the sacred bull was also an important concept.

The religious center of the Ozieri culture may have been the Monte d'Accoddi, a massive stone structure that was probably an altar, and has been called "the most singular cultic monument in the early Western Mediterranean".

== Gallery ==
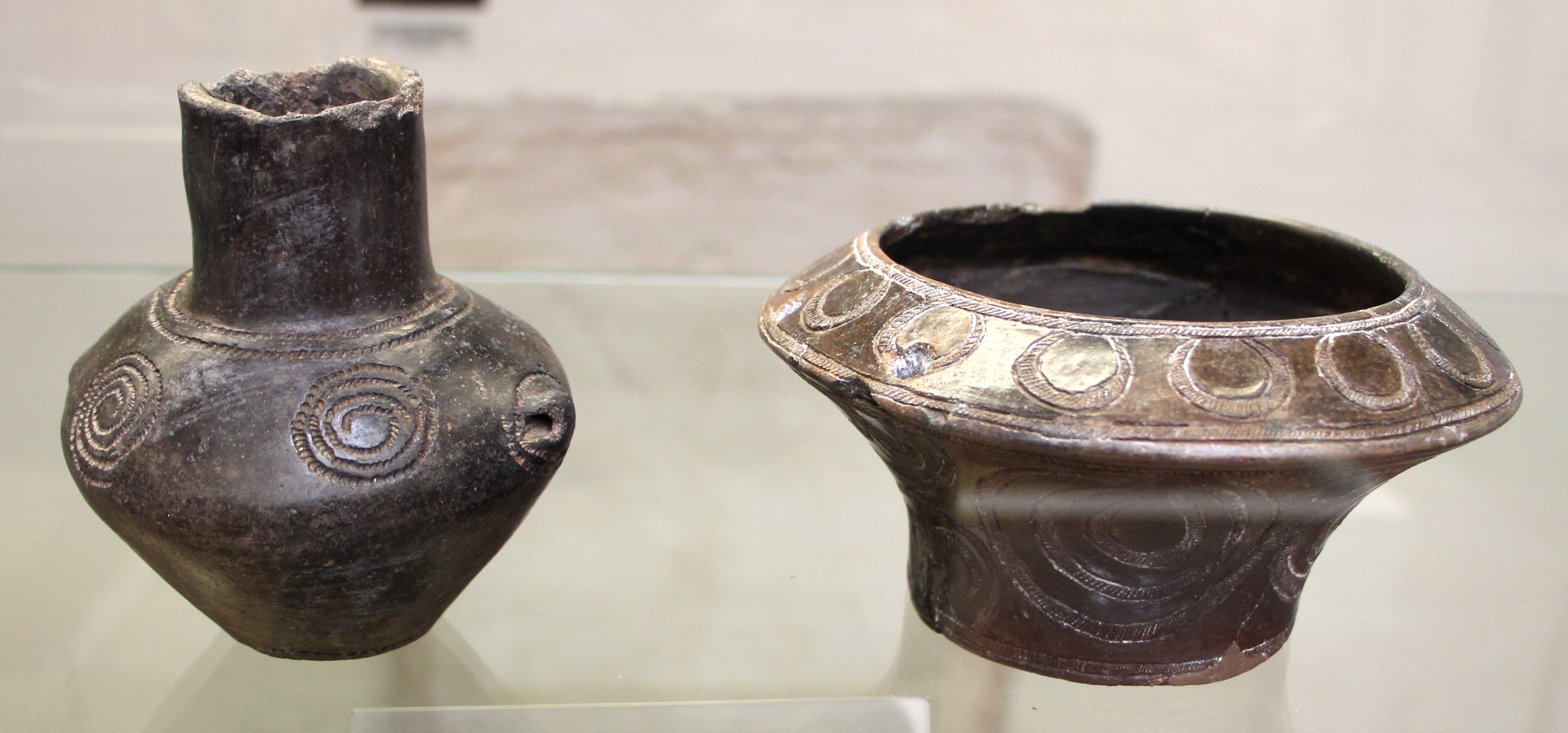
Ozieri pottery in its characteristic forms

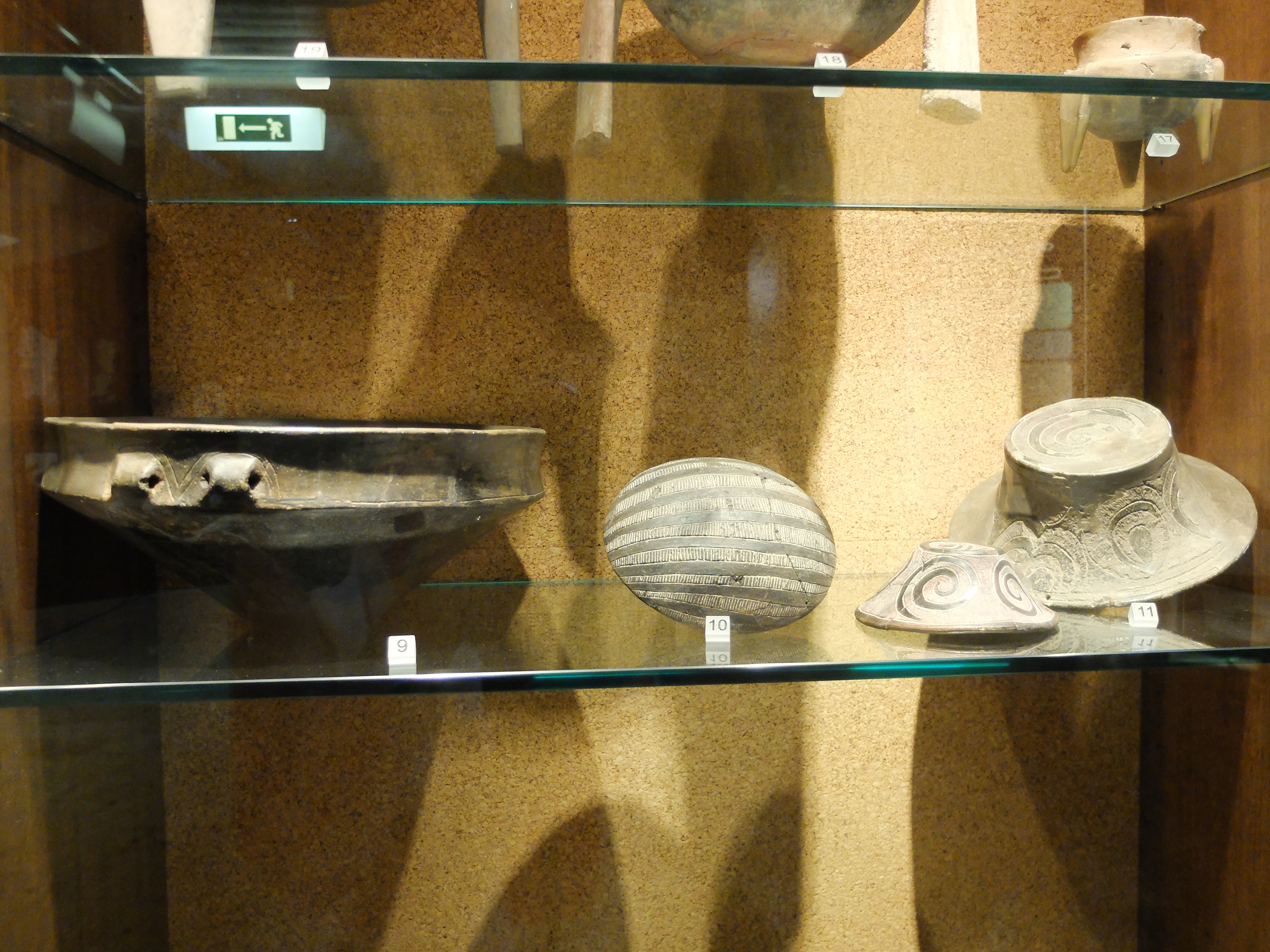
Pottery

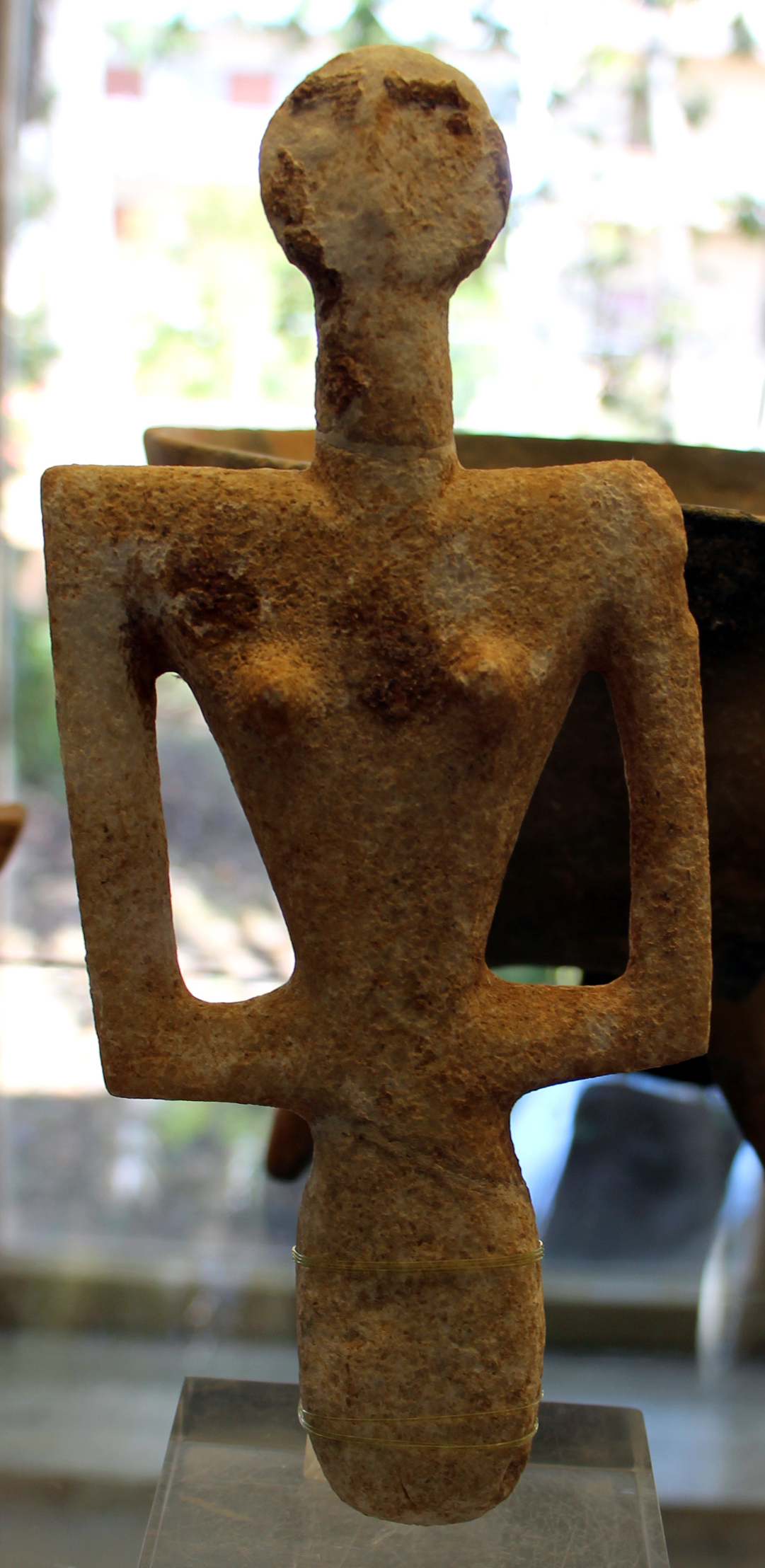
Female statuette found at Monte d'Accoddi

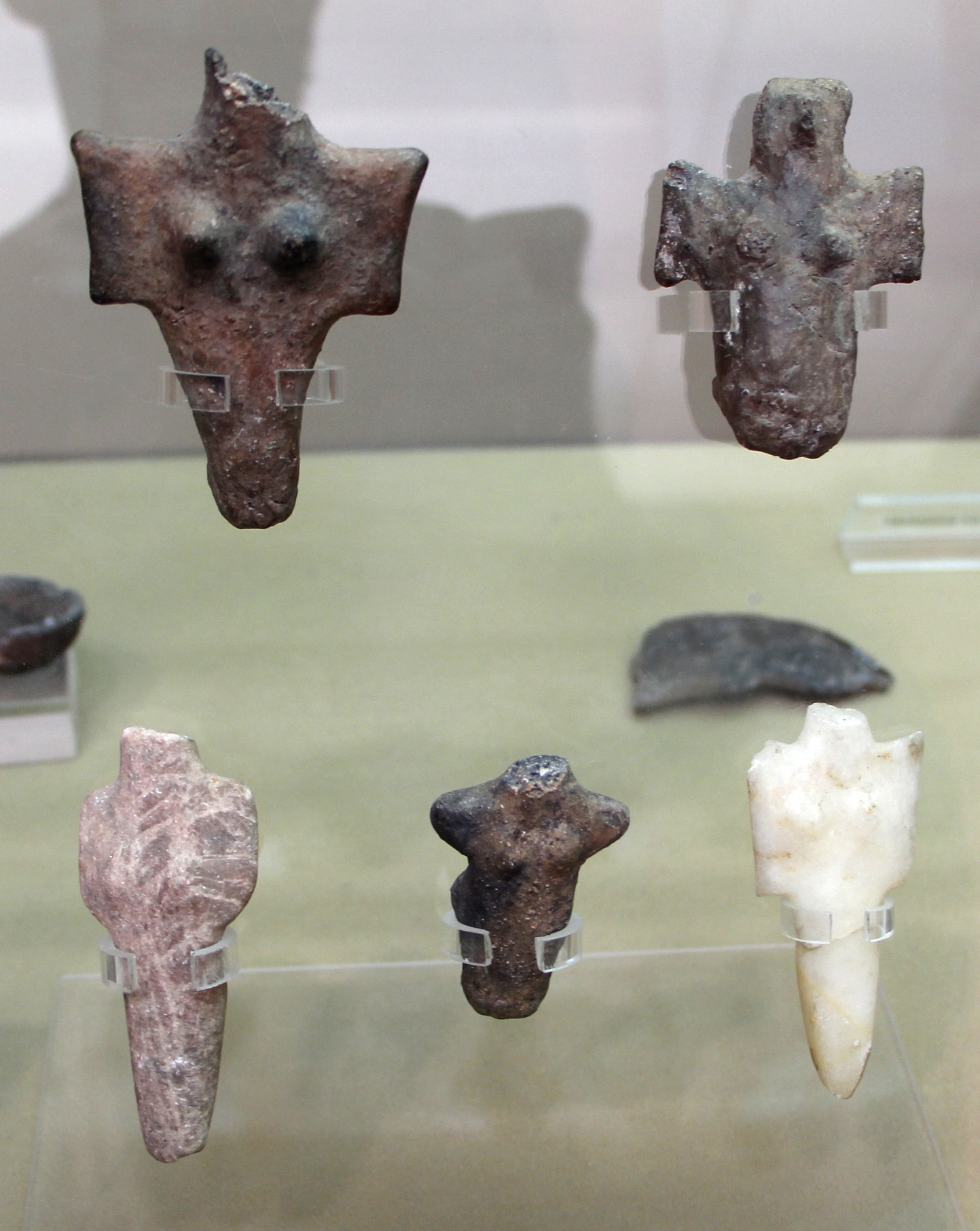
Female statuettes at the Museo Archeologico Nazionale G.A. Sanna

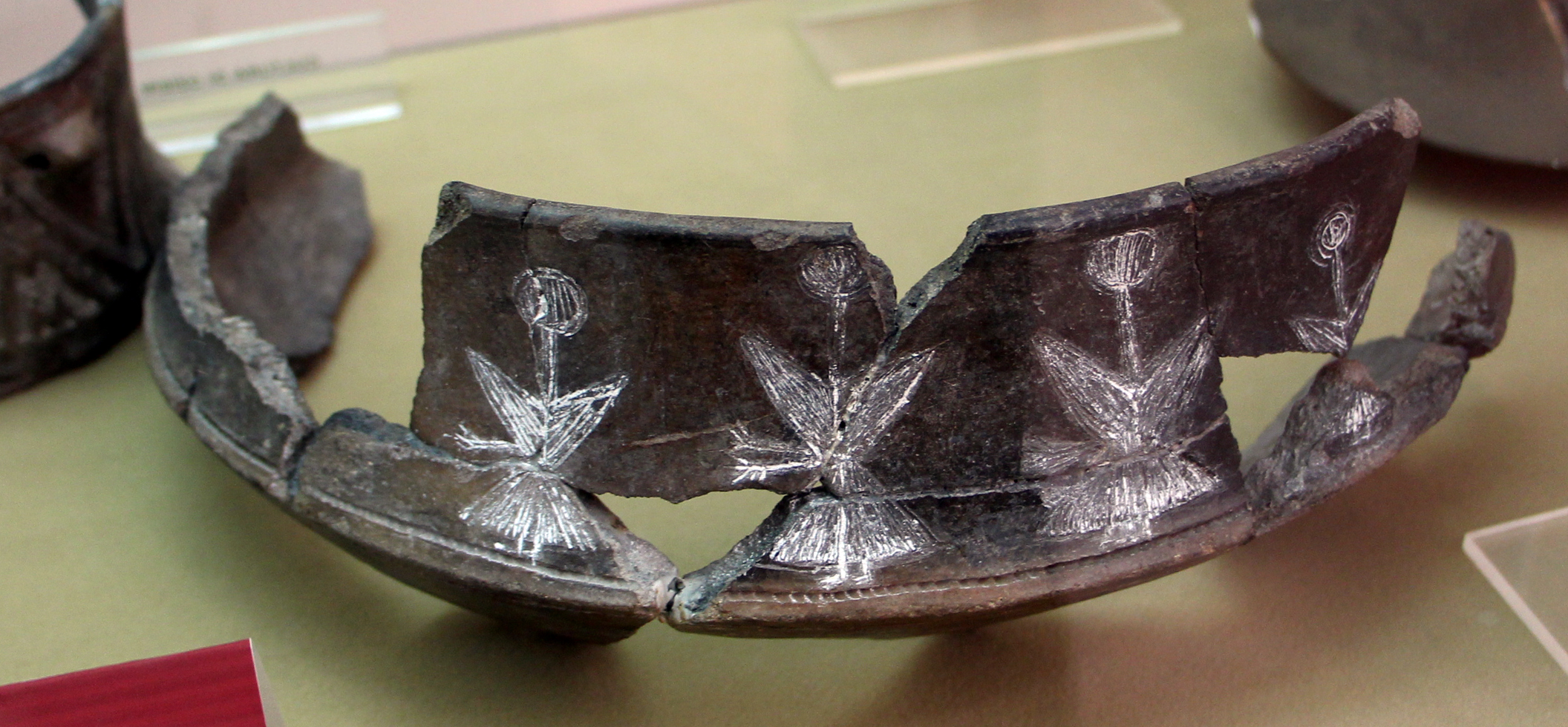
Potsherd with human figures

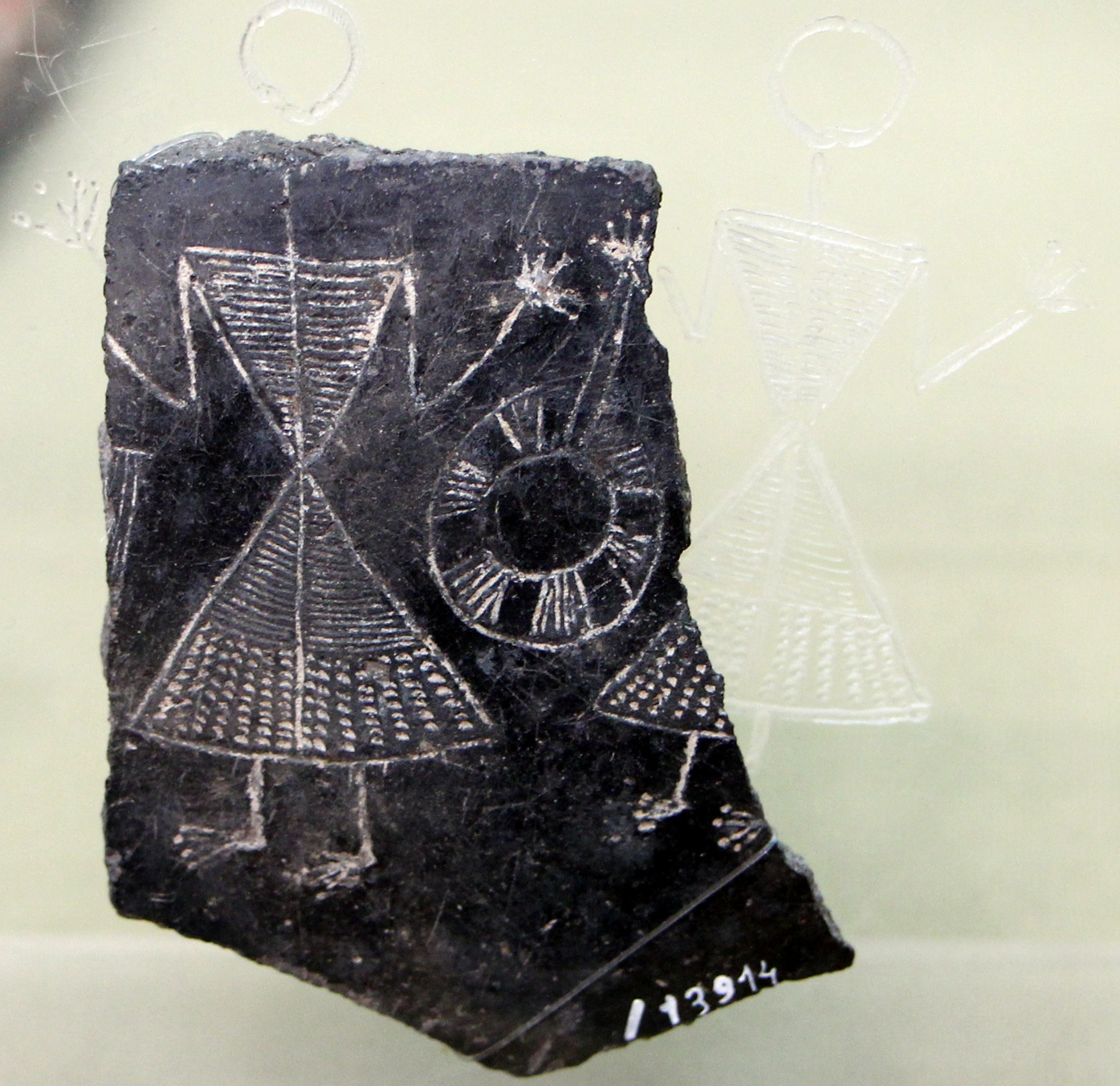
Potsherd with human figures

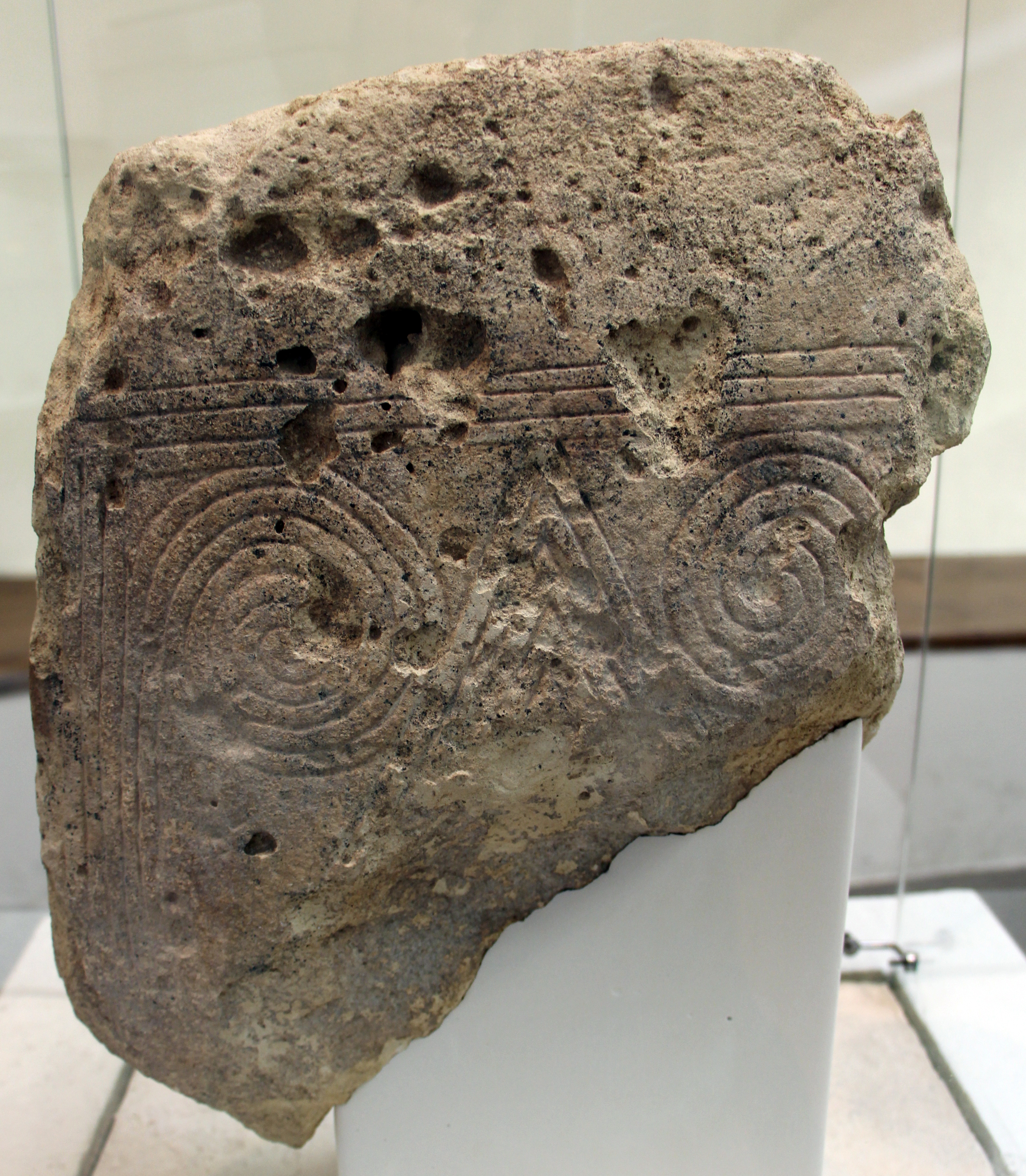
Stele with female figure

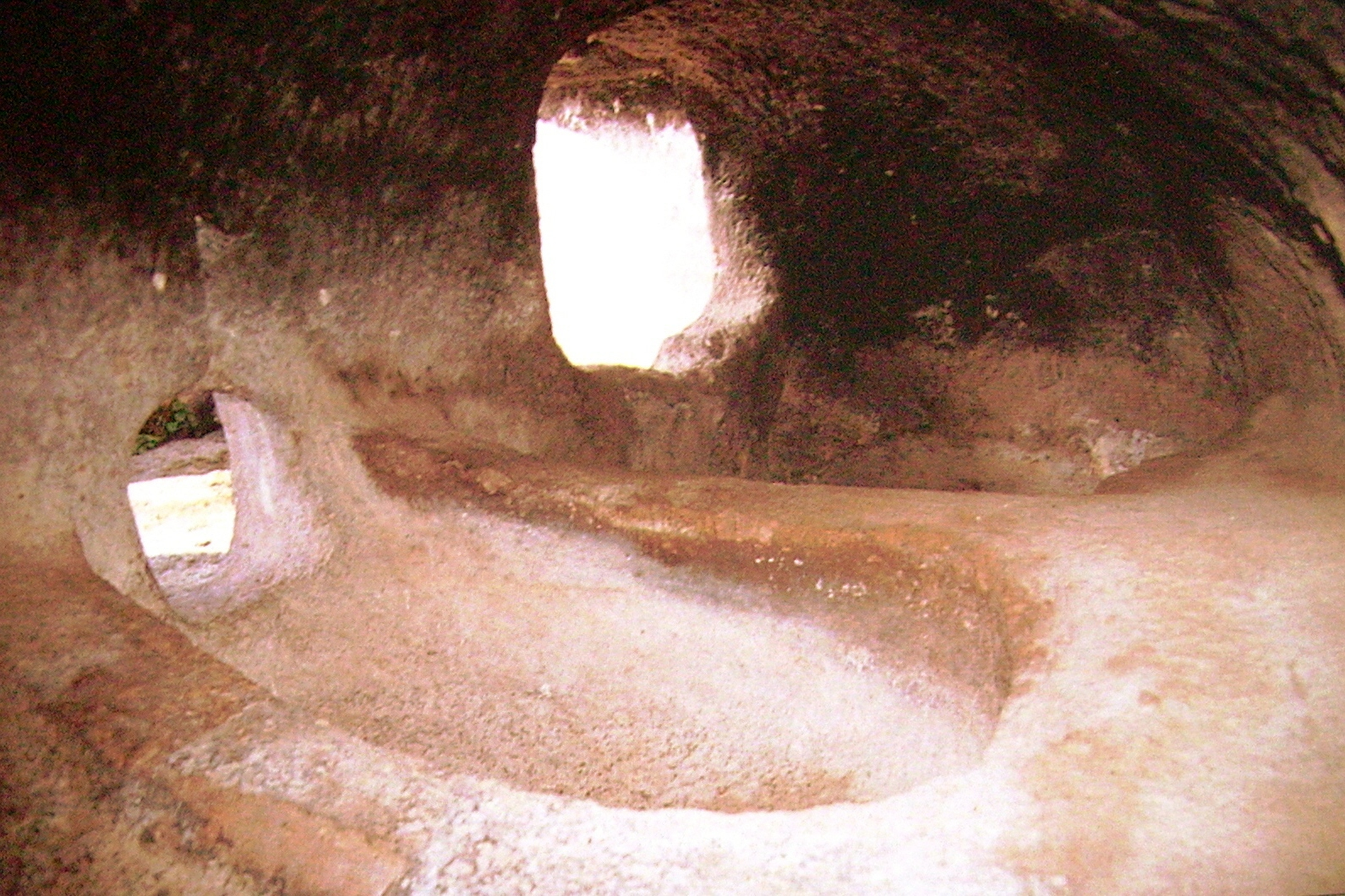
Domus de janas of the necropolis of Montessu, Villaperuccio

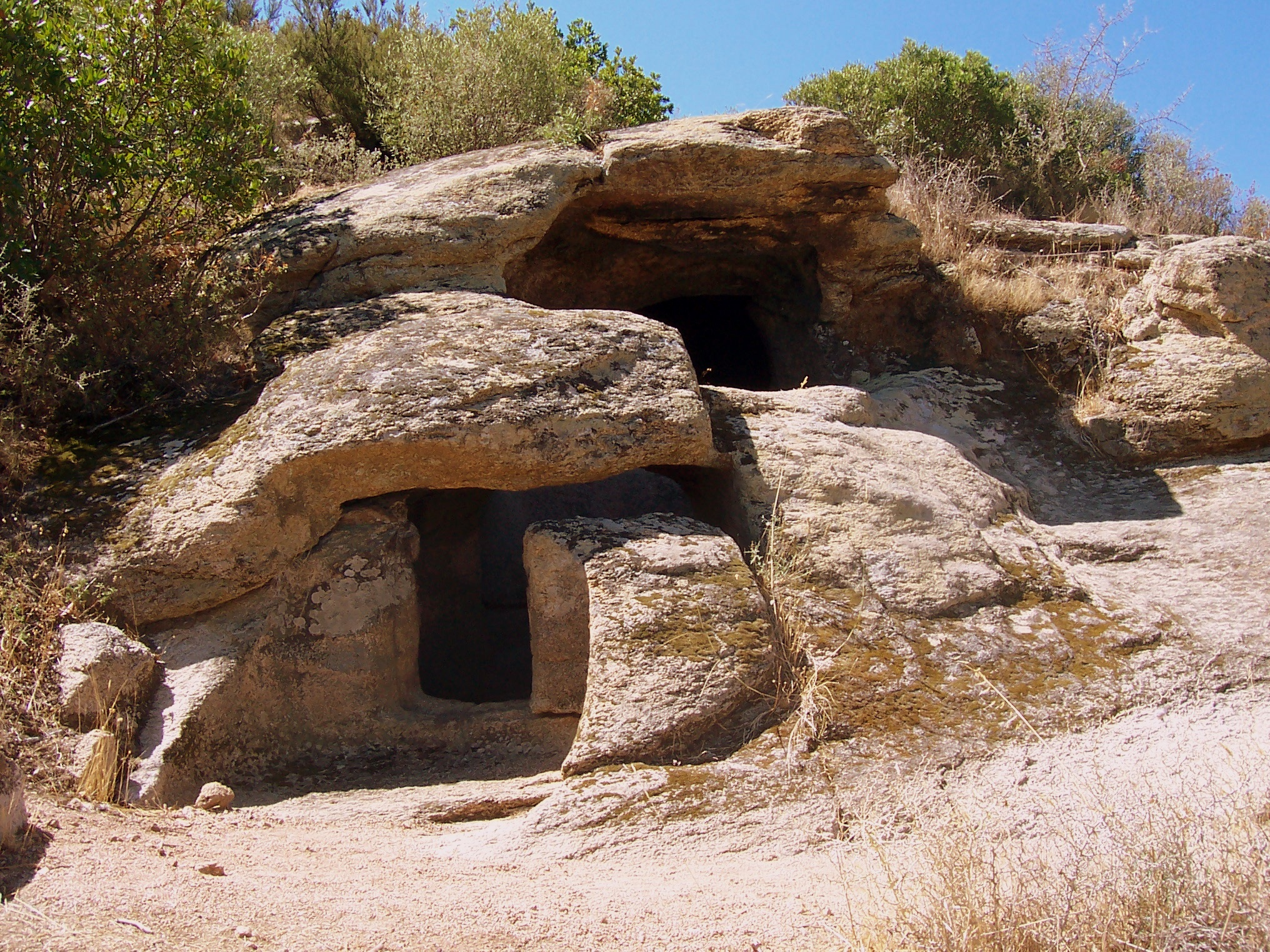
Domus de janas of Lotzorai

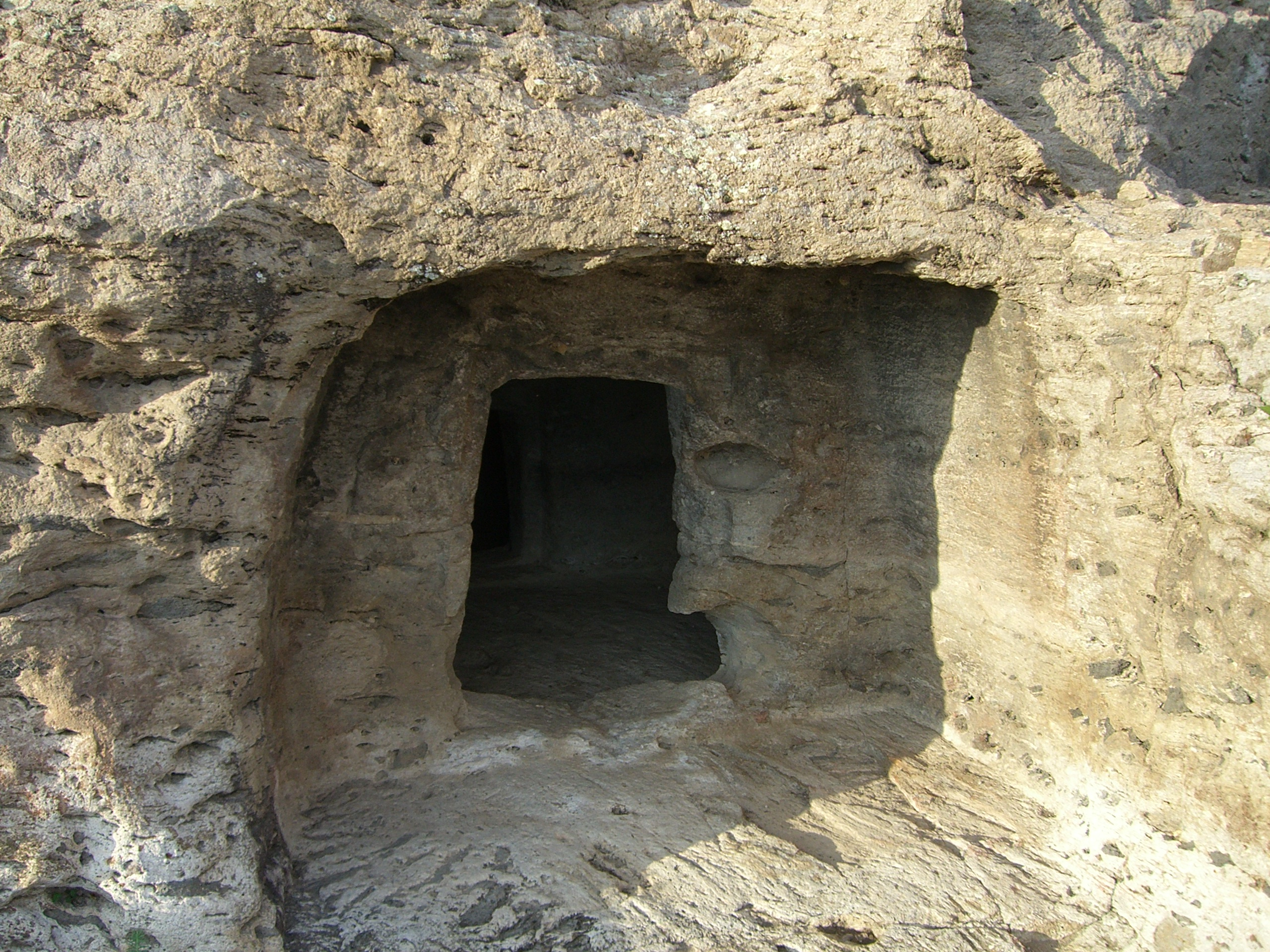
Domus de janas of the necropolis of Is Loccis-Santus, San Giovanni Suergiu

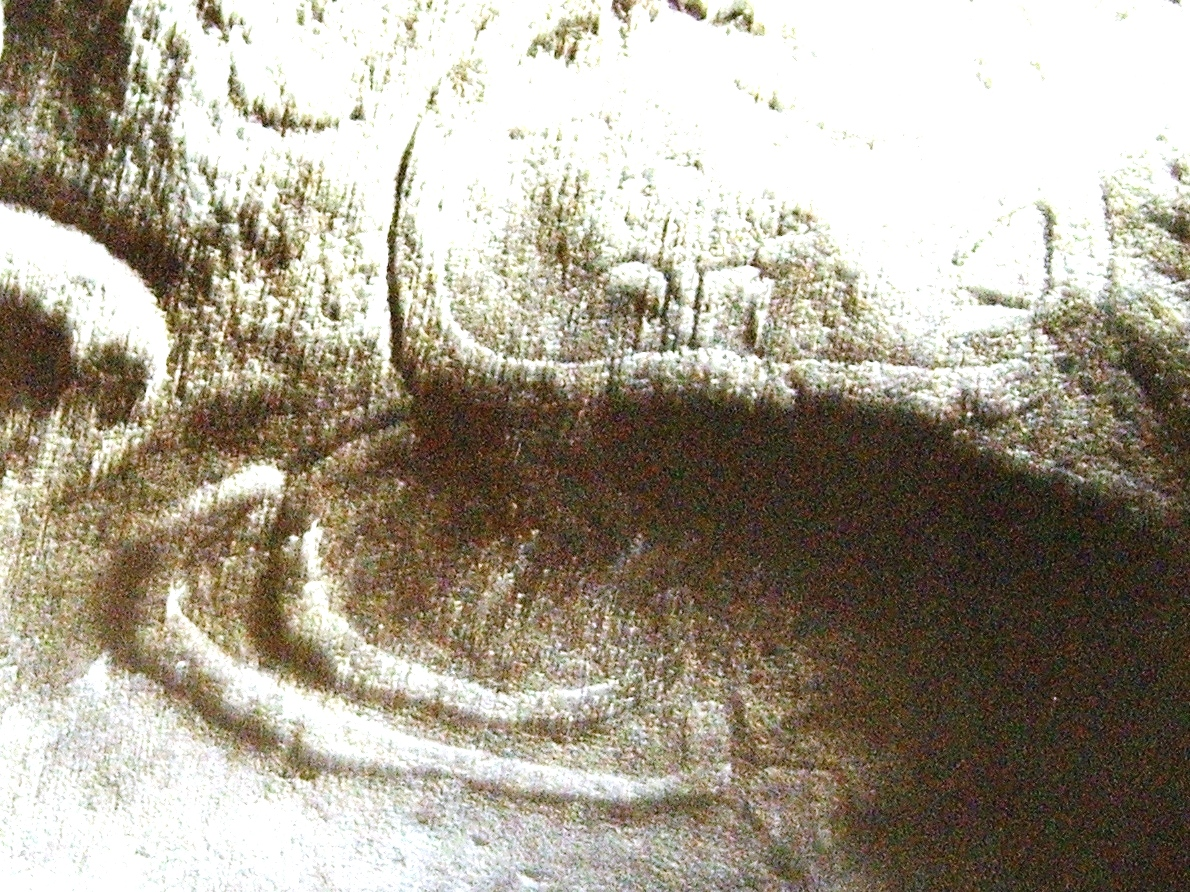
Bull horns sculpted in funerary niche inside a domus de janas
