= Necropolis of Li Muri =

Ancient site in Sardinia, Italy

Coordinates: 41.0701°N 9.3215°E

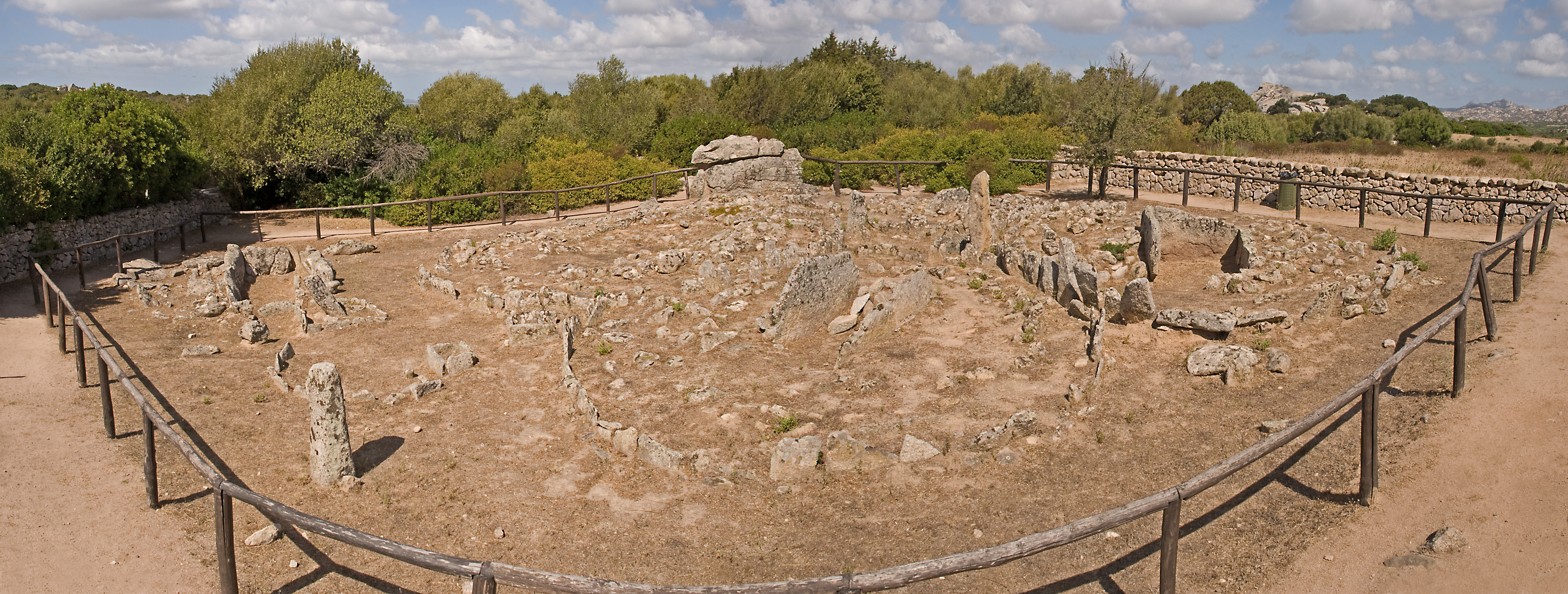
- Interactive map of Necropolis of Li Muri
- Type: Burial
- Periods: Neolithic
- Cultures: Pre-Nuragic Sardinia
- Location: Arzachena, Sardinia, Italy

The Necropolis of Li Muri is an archaeological site located in the municipality of Arzachena, Sardinia.

== Description ==
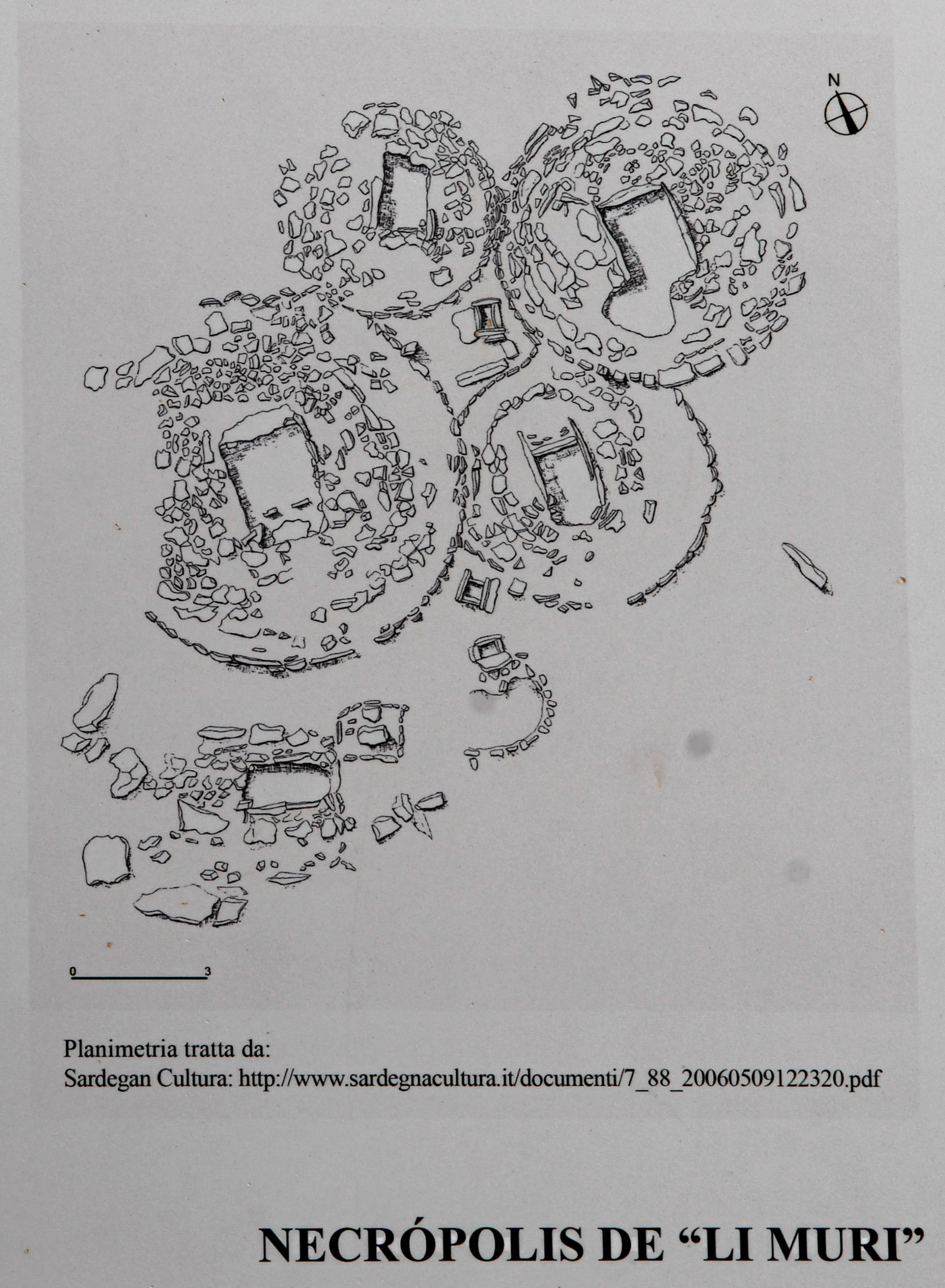
Plan of the site

The necropolis, thought to be a product of the Neolithic Arzachena culture and dating from the second half of the fourth millennium BC, is composed of five stone cists. Four of the cists are surrounded by stone circles that originally marked the limits of the mound of earth and rubble that was erected over the burial.

Bodies were interred inside the cists, probably individually (unlike in the rest of Sardinia where the graves were usually collective). The dead were accompanied by grave goods including pottery, stone vessels, hatchets and beads necklace of steatite and gemstones.

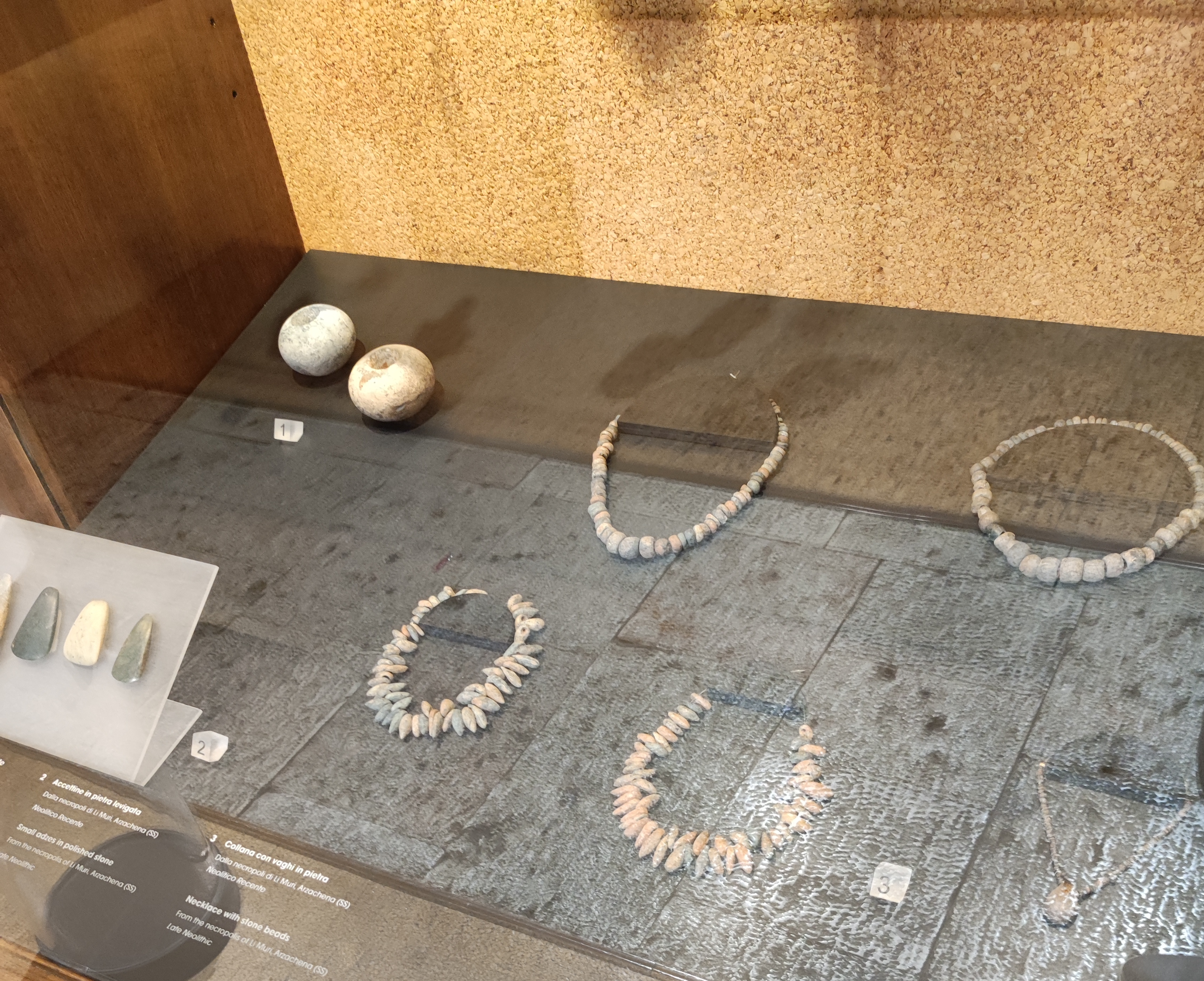
Finds in the National Archaeological Museum, Cagliari

The architecture of the necropolis shows strong similarities with contemporary sites of Corsica, Provence and the Pyrenees.

The necropolis forms part of the Arzachena Archaeological Park along with two other antiquities: the Nuraghe Albucciu and the Giants' grave of Coddu Vecchiu.

== Bibliography ==
- Paola Mancini, Gallura preistorica, 2011.
