= Beaker culture in Sardinia =

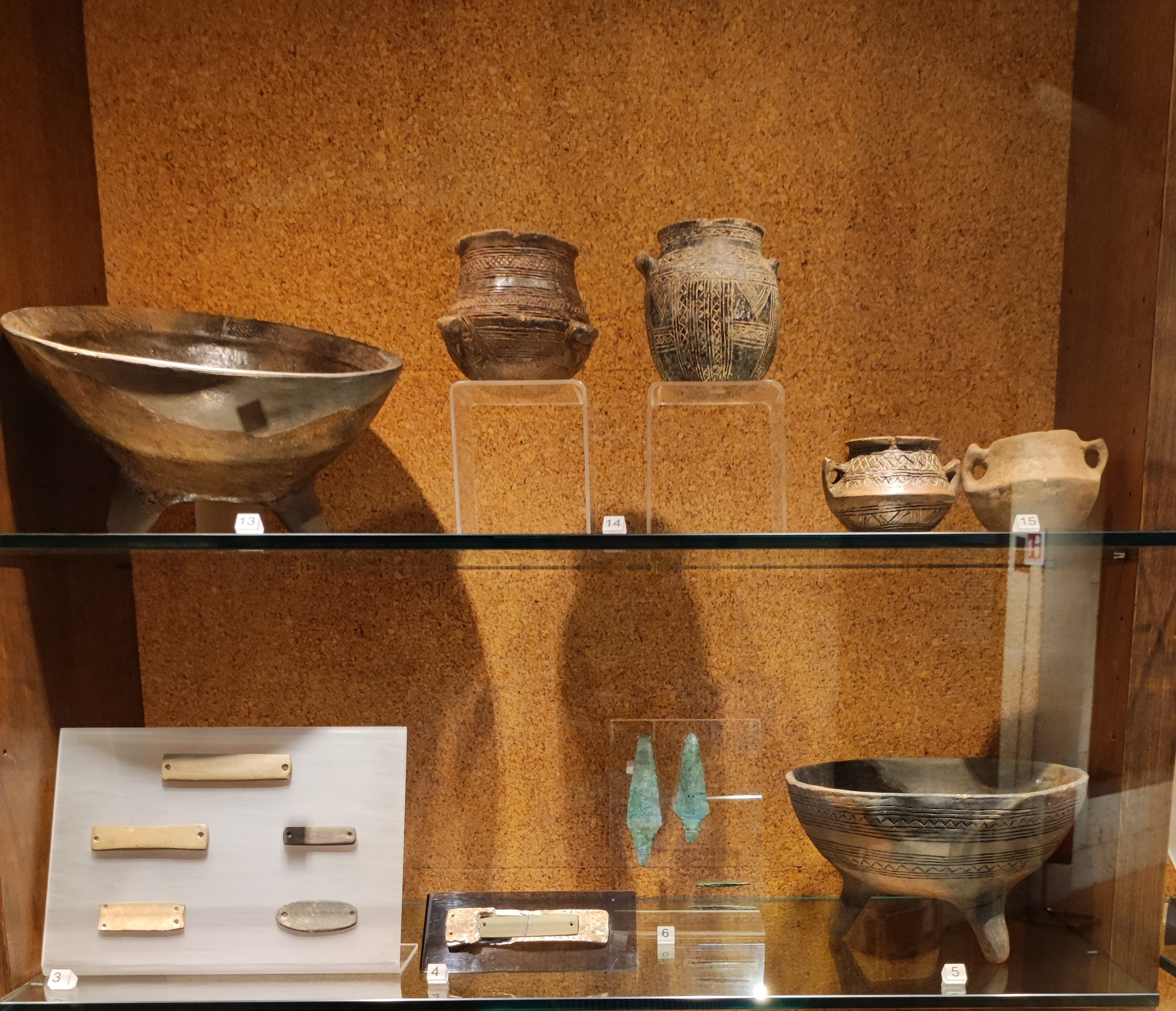
Bell Beaker material from various localities of Sardinia

The Beaker culture in Sardinia appeared circa 2100 BC (or according to other datations in 2300 BC or earlier) during the last phase of the Chalcolithic period. It initially coexisted with and then replaced the previous Monte Claro culture in Sardinia, developing until the Early Bronze Age circa 1900–1800 BC. Then, the Beaker culture mixed with the related Bonnanaro culture, considered the first stage of the Nuragic civilization.

== Chronology ==
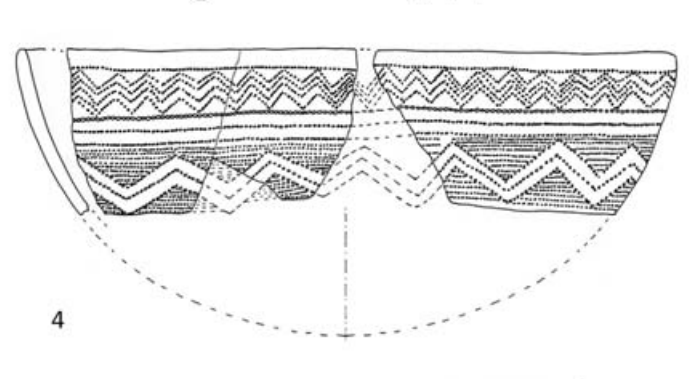
Bell Beaker pottery from Monte d'Accoddi.

The European Beaker culture is characterized by the use of classic bell-shaped ceramics. The different styles and decorations of these ceramics allow the Sardinian Beaker culture to be split into three main chronological phases:

- A1 Maritime-International phase (c. 2100–2000 BC) with strong Iberian and Provençal influences
- A2 Italian-Sulcitan phase (c. 2000–1900 BC) in which appear obvious influences from Central Europe
- B Undecorated Beaker phase (c. 1900–1800 BC), documented in the sites of "Lu Marinaru" and "Padru Jossu"

The various phases show the succession of two main components: the first "Franco-Iberian" (Catalonia and Southern France) and the second "central European" (throughout the Italian Peninsula). Thus, it seems likely that the Beaker culture was brought to the island over a long period of time by different waves of migrants from different regions of Europe. Sardinia was in turn the intermediary that brought Beaker materials to Sicily.

== Finds ==
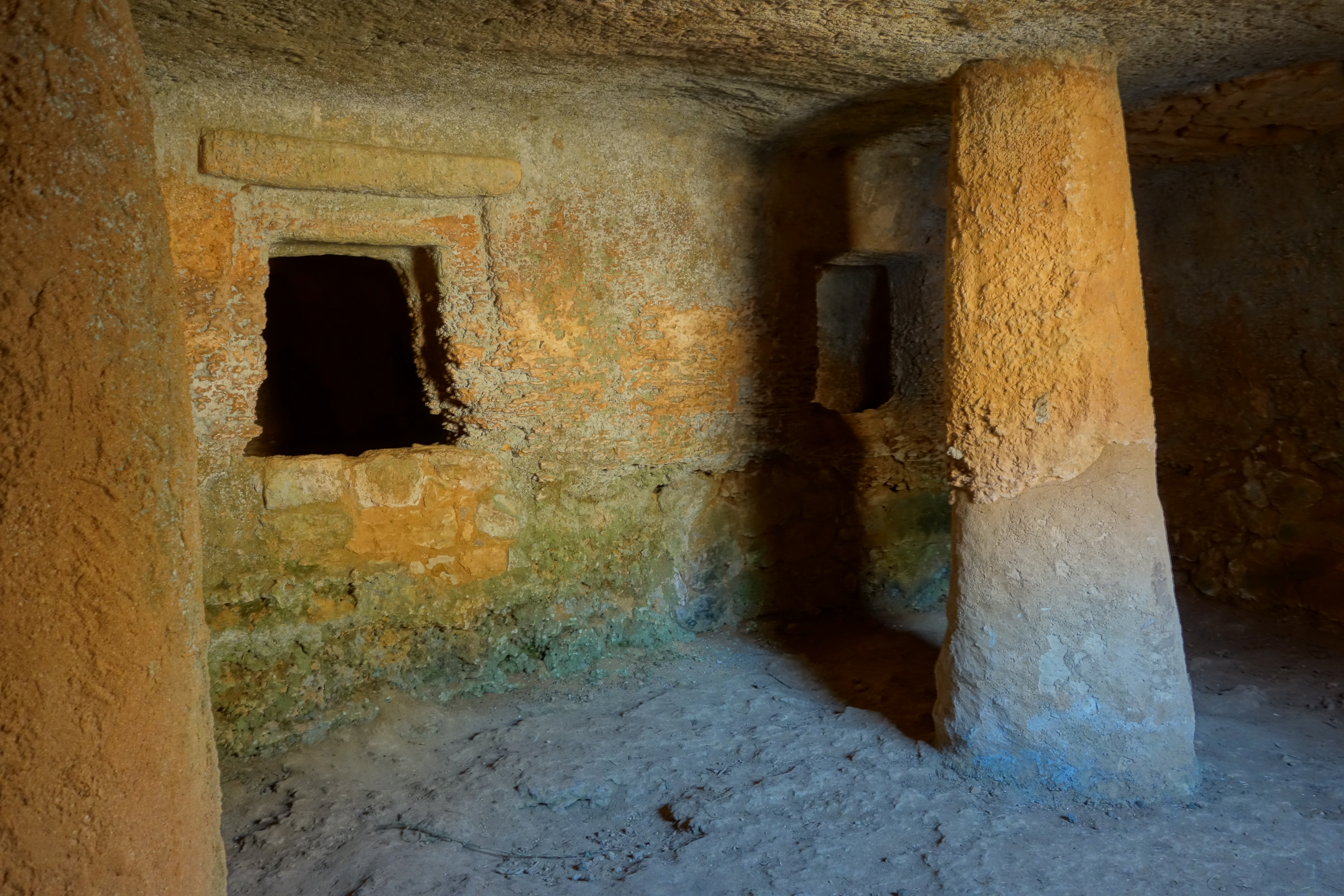
One of the domus de janas of the Necropolis of Anghelu Ruju, Alghero

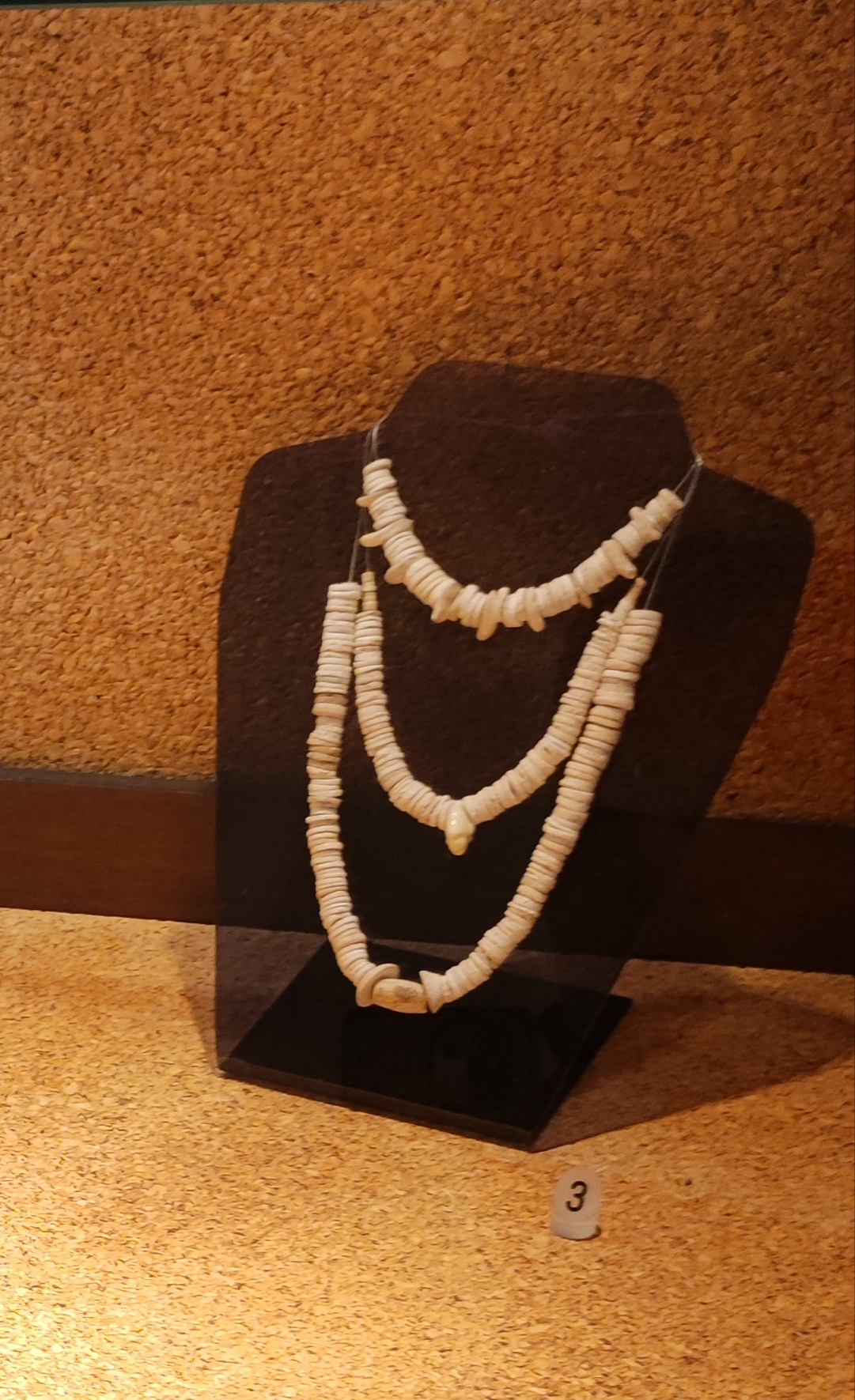
Necklace from Cape Sant'Elia, Cagliari

Beaker finds have been found at about seventy sites in Sardinia; they are concentrated mostly along the western coast of the island, from the Nurra region to Sulcis-Iglesiente, and in Campidano, with some settlement in the east, in Dorgali and in the Sarrabus.

Almost all Beaker finds are from burials (generally in pre-existing domus de janas, but also documented from individual burials within stone cists at Santa Vittoria-Nuraxinieddu near Oristano). The objects found include, besides the ceramics, the characteristic brassards (stone wrist-guards) to protect the forearms of archers, flint arrowheads and various ornaments including necklaces made of shells or tusks and buttons with a V-shaped perforation.

Metal objects include copper daggers with a triangular blade and pins. Gold artifacts appeared for the first time on the island (collier from the tomb of Bingia 'e Monti of Gonnostramatza).

== Settlements ==
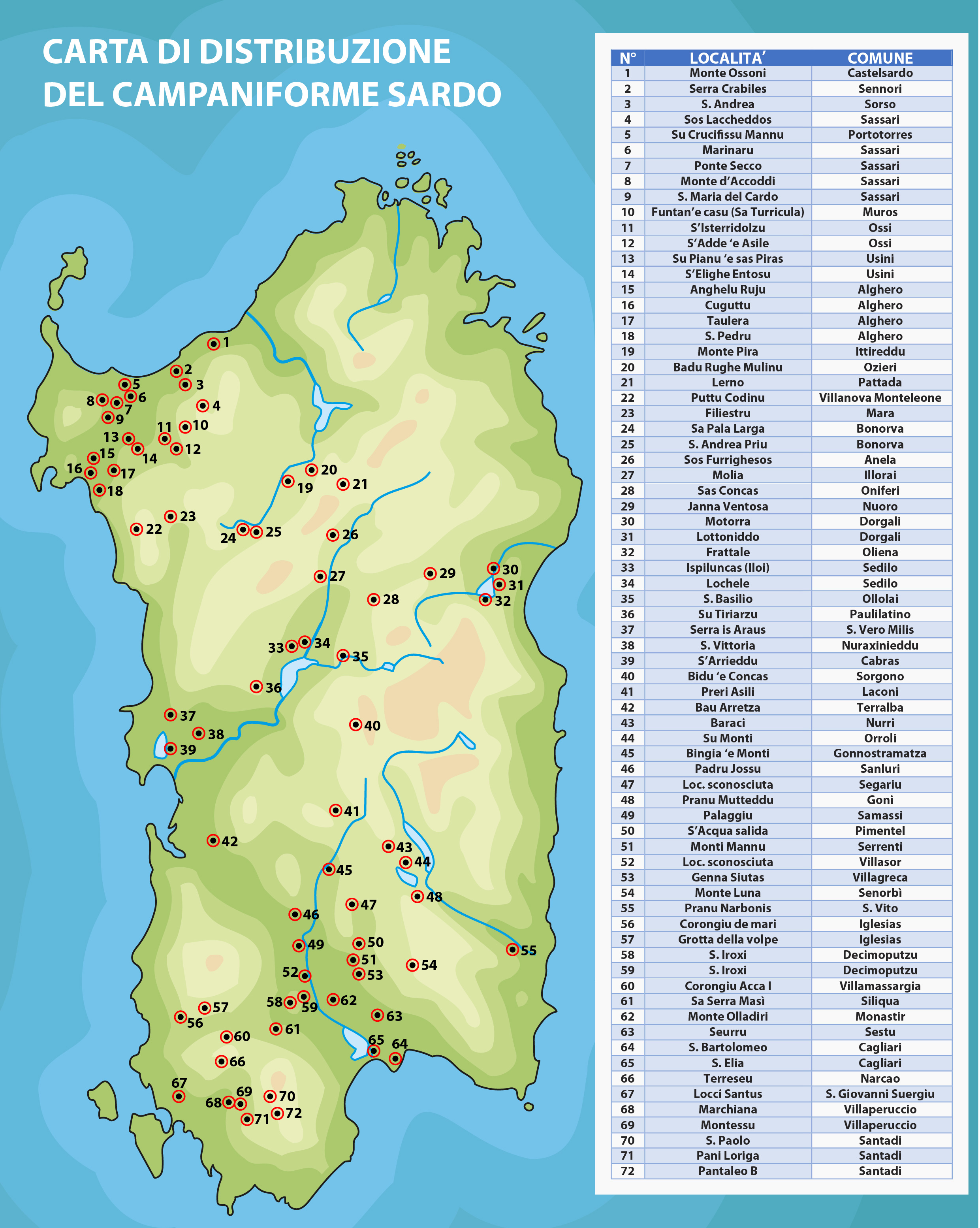
Beaker sites in Sardinia

The old open-air Monte Claro villages disappear almost completely after centuries of occupation (possibly due to climate change or tribal clashes with the newcomers) and only three settlements specifically attributable to this culture are known (Monte Ossoni in Castelsardo, Monte Ollàdiri in Monastir and Palaggiu in Samassi). This could mean that the Beaker bearers were nomadic people dwelling in tents or caves that depended mainly on the cultivation of wheat and the raising of sheep and goats (diet, as in Great Britain, was characterized by a high intake of animal proteins).

Beaker-bearing entities may have induced forced migration of the Monte Claro culture in refuge settlement such as Biriai (Oliena).

A unicum in Sardinia is represented by the site of Guardiole, on the island of Caprera. The complex, made up of a large rectangular megalithic enclosure and other buildings, shows evident similarities with the Beaker settlement of Ferrandell Olleza, on the island of Majorca.

== Religion ==
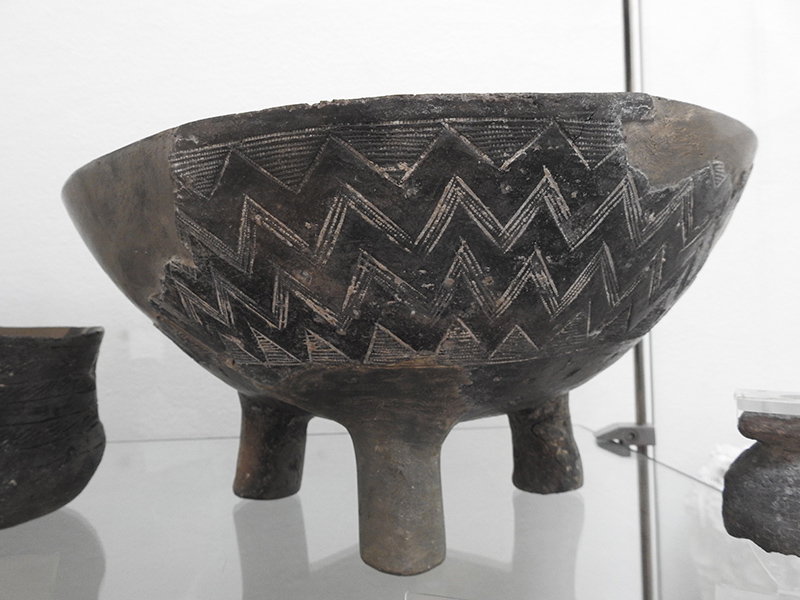
Tetrapod vase, Necropolis of Santu Pedru

The locations where Beaker people may have performed religious rituals are not known. The discovery of Beaker fragments near the megalithic altar of Monte d'Accoddi does not seem to be related to attendance for religious purposes, but rather indicates the sporadic continuity of activity around a monument already abandoned, perhaps following Beaker raids.

The remains of animals in the tomb of Padru Jossu (Sanluri) suggest sacrifices in honor of a lunar deity or the deceased.

One must think that the introduction of the Bell Beaker culture was due to the arrival of a new ethnic group which, although numerically a minority, brought profound changes in the political, economic and religious reality of the island. The new men who came from the sea are linked to pastoral experiences, they bring with them a lunar cult and they try to impose, partially succeeding, their patriarchal and at the same time hierarchical conception of society

— Giovanni Ugas, Facies campaniformi dell'ipogeo di Padru Jossu (1998)

== Physical anthropology ==
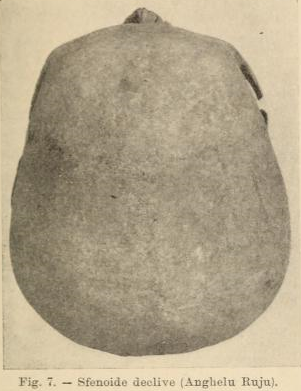
Brachycephalic skull from Anghelu Ruju (Giuseppe Sergi, La Sardegna, 1907)

Anthropological studies have shown that the Beakers were of a different physical type (shortheads) to the previous inhabitants of the island (longheads). About 15% of the skulls studied, belonging to this culture, are described as brachycephalic.

At Anghelu Ruju, the height of the individuals of the Beaker and Bonnanaro cultures ranged from 1.42 m to 1.72 m. A preliminary survey of the deceased at the hypogean-megalithic tomb of Pranu Siara (Suelli) has shown that they were characterized by robustness and tall stature.

== Paleogenetics ==
A genetic study published in Nature Communications in February 2020 examined the remains of a number of individuals identified with the Bell Beaker culture in Sardinia. According to the authors:

While we cannot exclude influx from genetically similar populations (e.g., early Iberian Bell Beakers), the absence of Steppe ancestry suggests genetic isolation from many Bronze Age mainland populations—including later Iberian Bell Beakers.

— Marcus, Joseph H.; et al. (February 24, 2020). "Genetic history from the Middle Neolithic to present on the Mediterranean island of Sardinia"

According to a 2022 study by Rémi Tournebize et al., the appearance of the Bell Beaker culture coincides with a founder effect on the Island (4114 ± 366 years ago).

Another 2022 study by Manjusha Chintalapati et al., found that a moderate steppe-related ancestry arrived in Sardinia in ~2600 BC.

Genetic data appears to support the hypothesis of a patrilocal society.

== See also ==
- Pre-Nuragic Sardinia
- Chalcolithic Europe

== Bibliography ==
- Ugas, Giovanni (2005). L'Alba dei Nuraghi. Cagliari: Fabula editrice. ISBN 88-89661-00-3.
- Germanà, Franco (1995). L'uomo in Sardegna dal paleolitico fino all'età nuragica.
- Lai, Luca (2008), The Interplay of Economic, Climatic and Cultural Change Investigated Through Isotopic Analyses of Bone Tissue: The Case of Sardinia 4000–1900 BC
- Webster, Gary; Webster, Maud (2017), Punctuated Insularity. The Archaeology of 4th and 3rd millennium Sardinia, Oxford: BAR International Series 2871
