= Tomb of Bingia 'e Monti =

Archaeological site in Sardinia, Italy

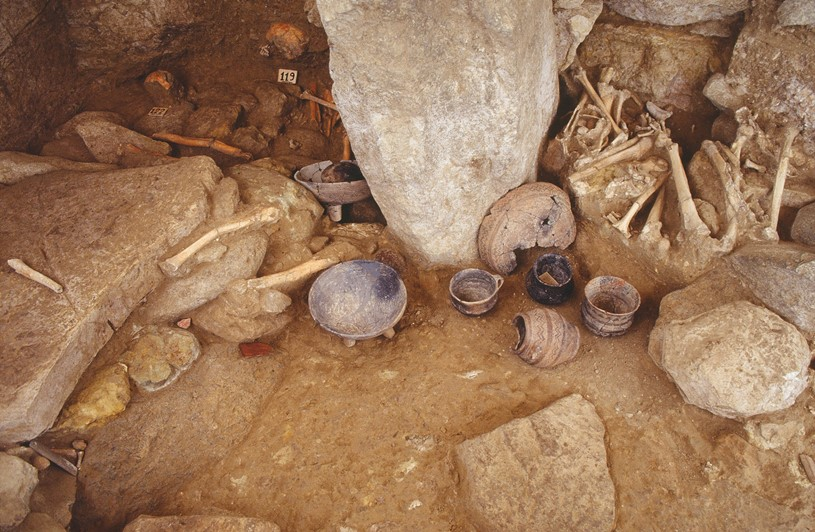
- Interactive map of Tomb of Bingia 'e Monti
- Type: Burial
- Periods: Chalcolithic, Bronze Age
- Cultures: Pre-Nuragic Sardinia
- Location: Gonnostramatza, Sardinia, Italy

The tomb of Bingia 'e Monti is a pre-Nuragic archaeological site located in the municipality of Gonnostramatza, in the province of Oristano, Sardinia.

The tomb has the peculiarity of being halfway between hypogeism and megalithism. It consists of a compartment carved into the rock and another room whose sides are four large stone blocks and other small stones, capped with lintels.

It was used between the Chalcolithic and Early Bronze Age by the people of the Monte Claro culture, the Bell Beaker culture, and the Bonnanaro culture. Excavations have uncovered, in addition to numerous skeletal remains, several objects including a gold torc, the oldest artifact of this material ever found in Sardinia.
