= Necropolis of Pranu Muttedu =

Ancient site in Sardinia, Italy

- Necropolis of Pranu Muttedu
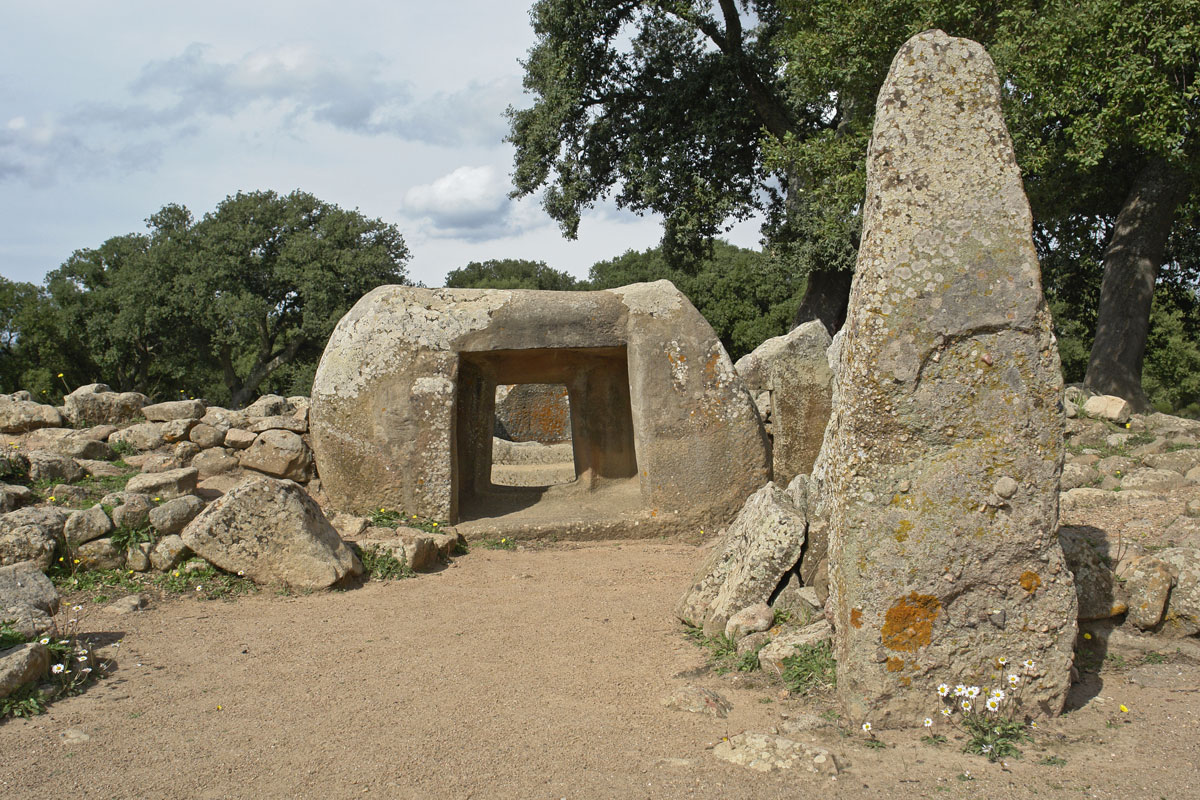

- Location within Italy
- 39°34′03.49″N 9°16′04.79″E
- Type: Necropolis
- Cultures: Pre-Nuragic Sardinia
- Location: Goni, Sardinia, Italy
- Region: Sardinia

Site notes
- Management: Soprintendenza per i Beni Archeologici per le province di Cagliari e Oristano
- Public access: Yes
- Website: http://www.pranumuttedu.com/

UNESCO World Heritage Site
- Part of: Funerary Tradition in the Prehistory of Sardinia – The domus de janas
- Criteria: Cultural: iii
- Reference: 1730-026
- Inscription: 2025 (47th Session)

The necropolis of Pranu Muttedu is one of the most important funerary areas of pre-Nuragic Sardinia and is located near Goni, a small village in the Metropolitan City of Cagliari.

The complex has the second highest known concentration of menhirs in Sardinia (about sixty, variously distributed in pairs, groups or arrays).

== Description ==
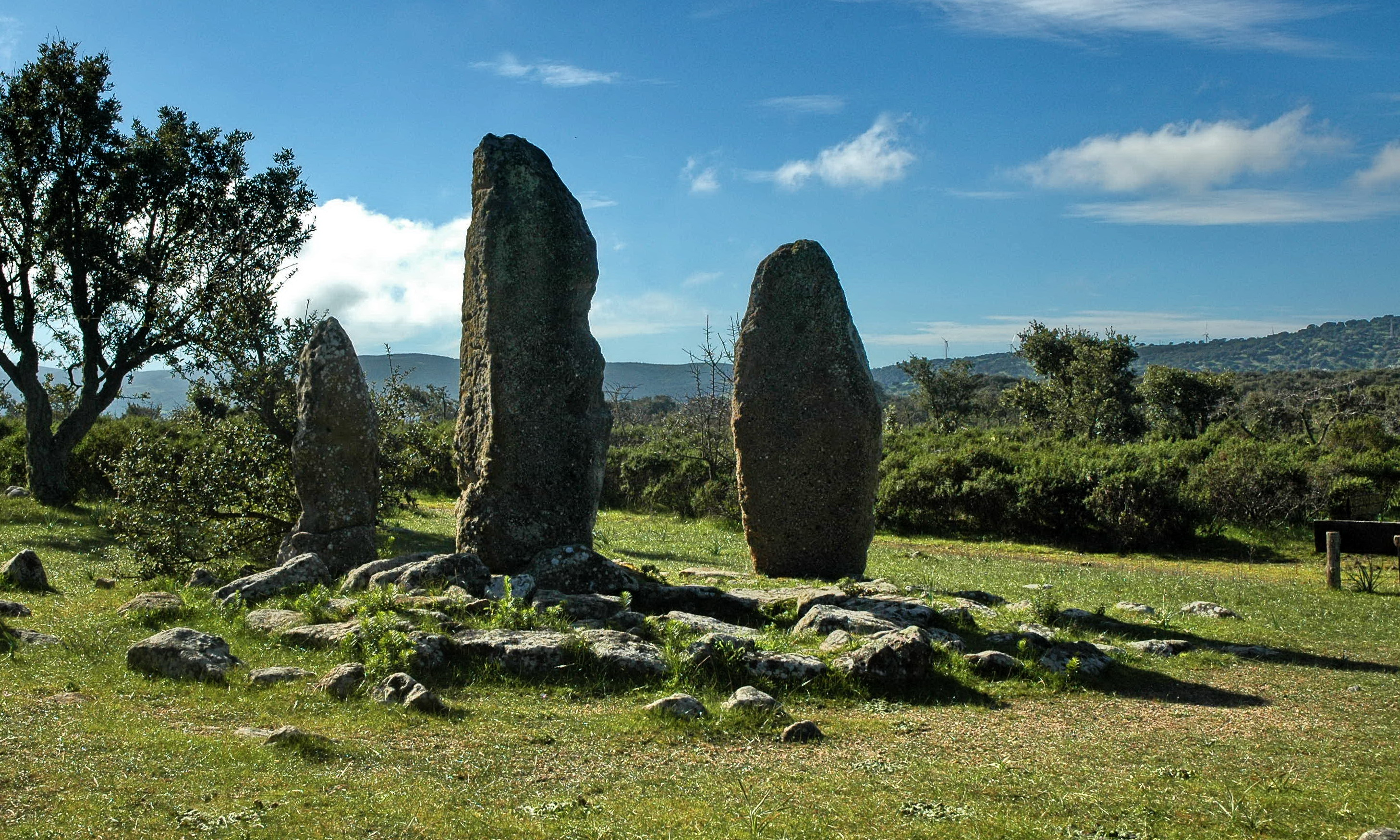
Triad of menhirs

The park covers an area of about 200,000 square meters. The complex features a high concentration of menhirs—around sixty—second only to the vast site of Biru 'e Concas in Sorgono, where roughly 200 menhirs have been recorded. These are arranged in pairs, alignments, or groups.

Other monuments include funerary chambers of various types, originally covered by a tumulus and enclosed within megalithic circles built with stone blocks arranged in concentric rings.

The area also contains several domus de janas.

One of the most widely circulated guidebooks on Sardinia has described the site as the "Sardinian Stonehenge".

The complex has been excavated by Enrico Atzeni, on several occasions since 1980. The site was used from the Late Neolithic period (Ozieri culture) to the Copper Age.

== Gallery ==
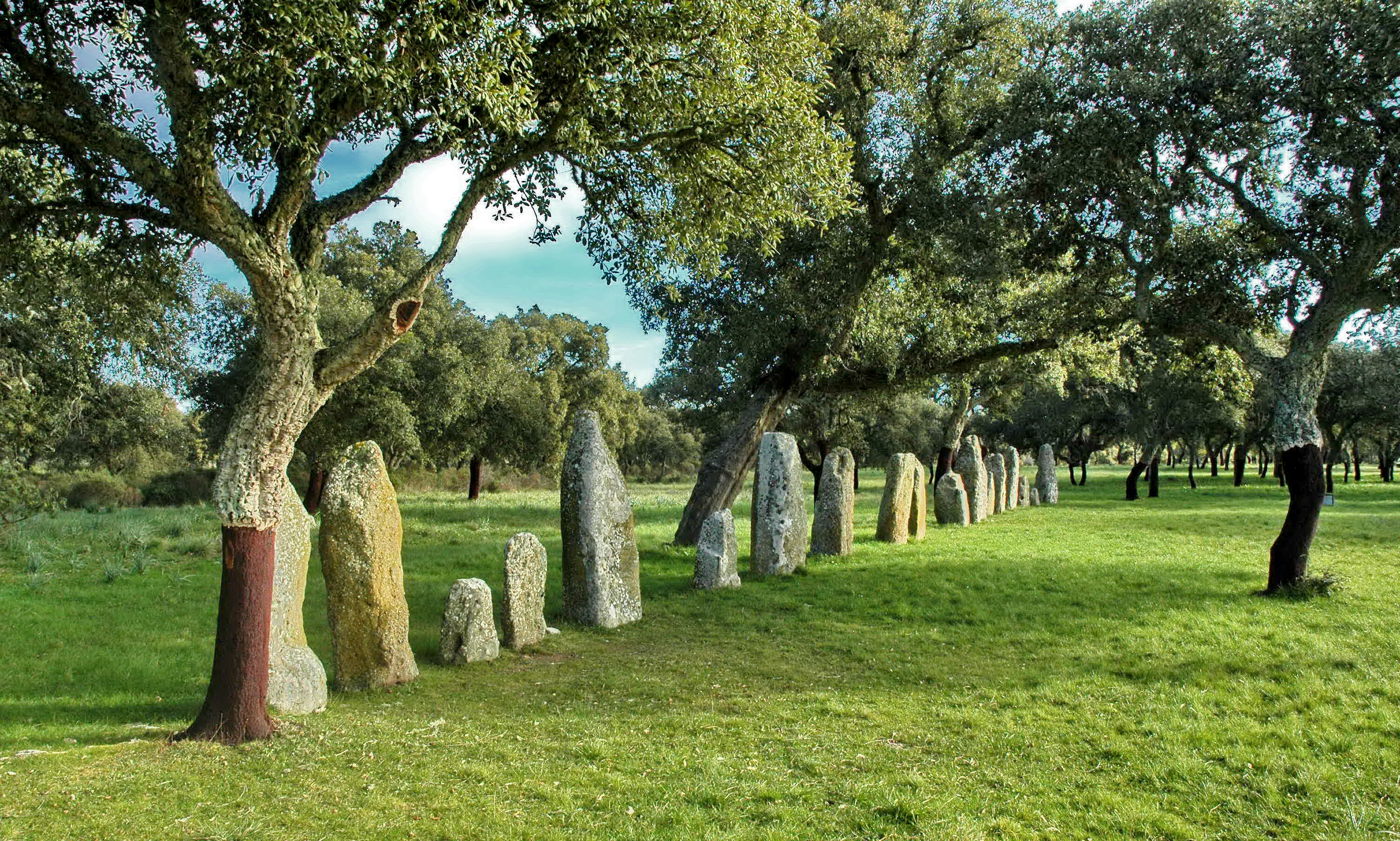

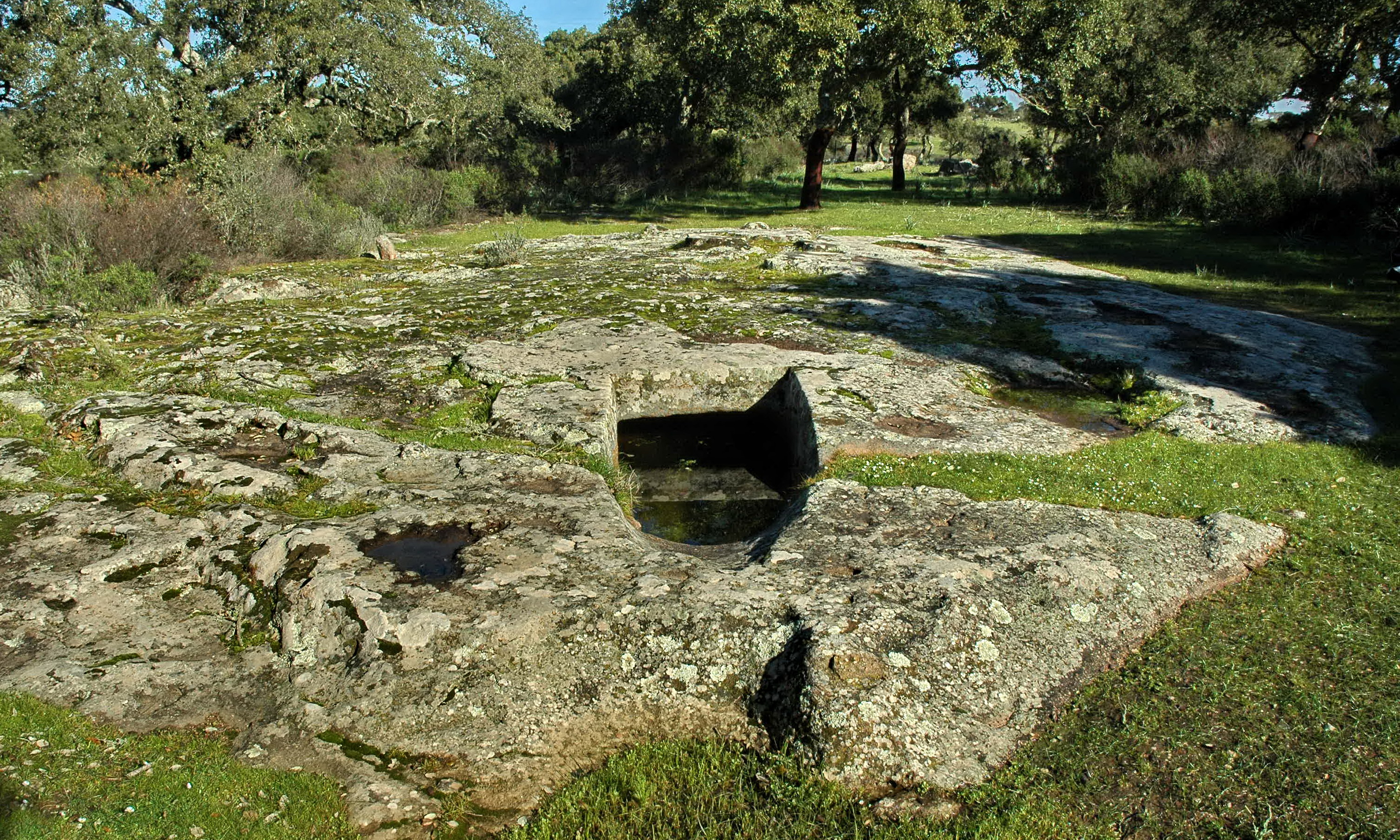

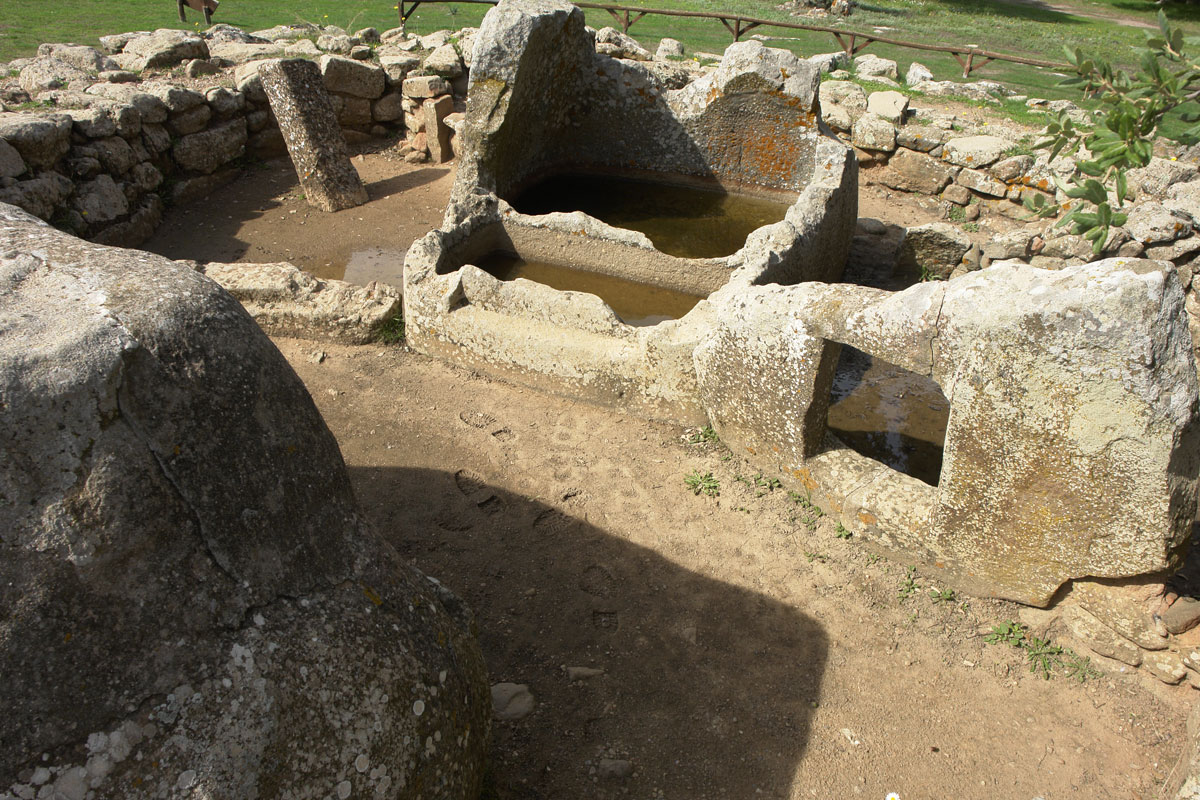

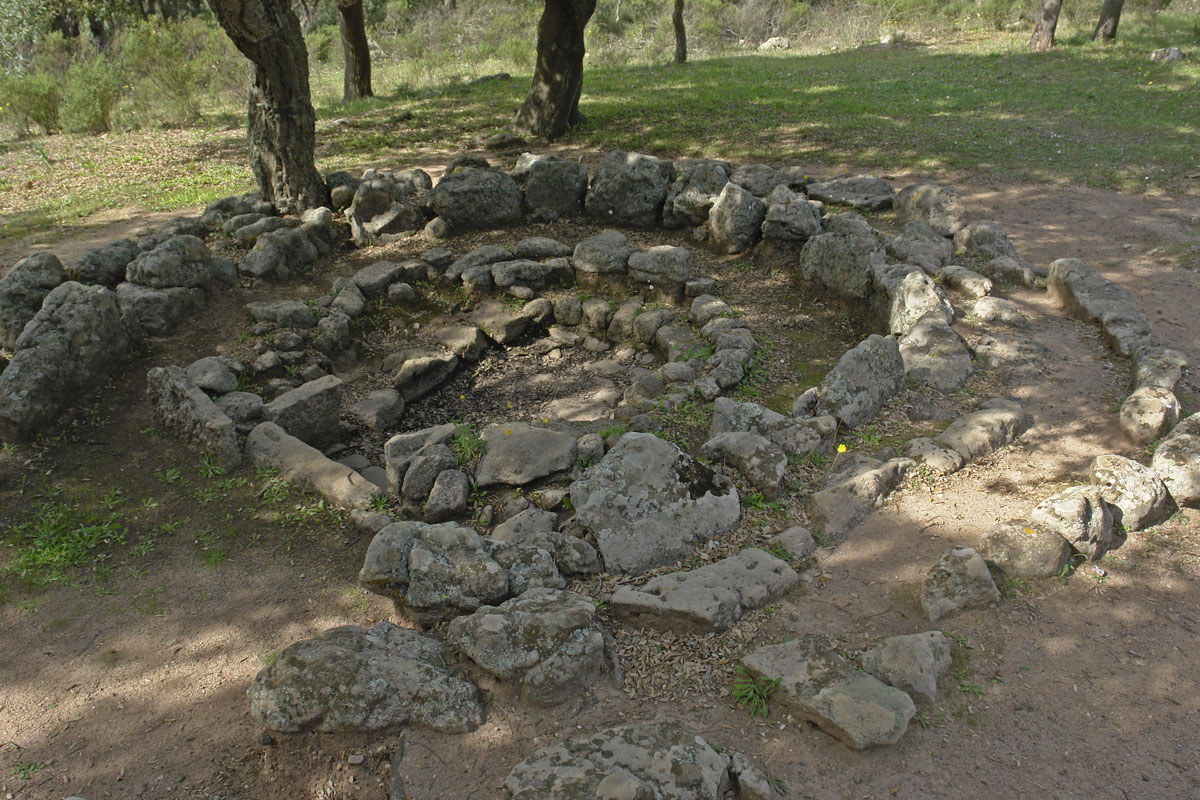

== Bibliography ==
- G. Lilliu, La civiltà dei Sardi dal paleolitico all'età dei nuraghi, Torino, Nuova ERI, 1988;
- E. Atzeni-D. Cocco, Nota sulla necropoli megalitica di Pranu Muttedu-Goni, in La Cultura di Ozieri. Problematiche e nuove acquisizioni, Ozieri, Il Torchietto, 1989, pp. 201–216.
- Goni, Menhir e sepolture megalitiche di Pranu Muttedu
