= Casteddu de Fanaris =

Archaeological site in the Province of South Sardinia, Italy

Coordinates: 39.3444°N 8.8389°E

The Casteddu de Fanaris (Castle of Fanaris in English) is an important archaeological site located in the municipality of Decimoputzu, along the border with the town of Vallermosa, in the Province of South Sardinia.

The site, dating back to the late Bronze Age (1300–1000 BC), is a complex-type nuraghe that consists of a central tower surrounded by eight additional towers to form a bastion. The bastion is surrounded by a megalithic wall with five towers with loopholes. For its construction were used mainly granite boulders, a material available near the site.

The fort is located at 147 meters above the sea level and occupies a strategic position to control the access road that from the Iglesiente lead to the Campidano plain.
