= Tomb of Padru Jossu =

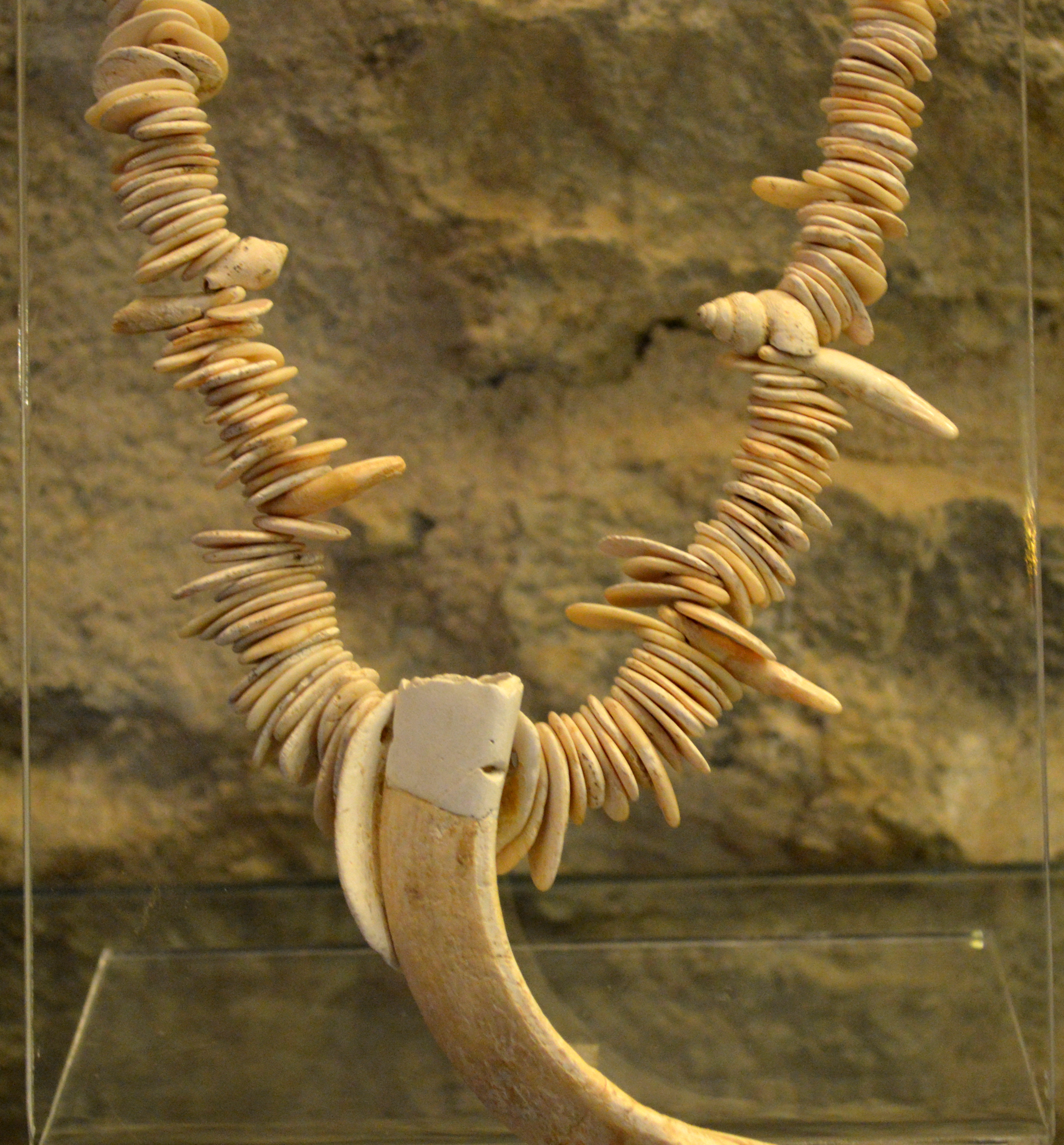
- Necklace from Padru Jossu
- Type: Burial
- Periods: Chalcolithic, Bronze Age
- Cultures: Pre-Nuragic Sardinia
- Location: Sanluri, Sardinia, Italy

The tomb or hypogeum of Padru Jossu is a prenuragic archaeological site situated in the territory of Sanluri, in the province of Medio Campidano.

The hypogeum was carved from the sandstone and consists of a rectangular chamber; the entrance of the tomb was located in the west wall. The site was used during the Chalcolithic and the Early Bronze Age by the people of the Monte Claro culture and the Bell Beaker culture. Among the unearthed funerary objects are reported pottery, necklaces, silver and copper artifacts and stone wrist-guards. The remains of animal skeletons are assumed to be ritual offerings in honor of the deceased.

About 20 skulls belonging to the Beaker layer show an heterogeneous population in which indigenous peoples (77% dolichocephalics) lived together with people who came from outside (23% brachycephalics).

== Bibliography ==
- Germanà, Franco (1995). L'uomo in Sardegna dal paleolitico fino all'età nuragica.
