= Hypogeum of Sant'Iroxi =

- Ipogeo di Sant'Iroxi (Italian)
- Tomb of the warriors
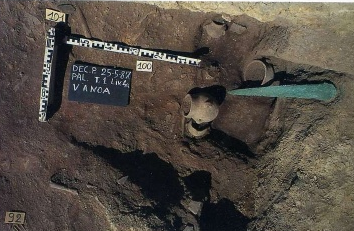
- Sant'Iroxi

- Location within Italy
- 39°20′10″N 8°55′13″E
- Type: Necropolis
- Cultures: Pre-Nuragic Sardinia
- Location: Decimoputzu, Sardinia, Italy
- Region: Sardinia

History
- Built: 4th millennium BC

Site notes
- Management: Superintendence for the Archaeological Heritage in the Provinces of Cagliari and Oristano (Soprintendenza per i Beni Archeologici per le province di Cagliari e Oristano)
- Public access: No

The Hypogeum of Sant'Iroxi (also known as the Tomb of the warriors) is an archaeological site located near the town of Decimoputzu in the province of South Sardinia.

== Dating ==
The site (a domus de janas), discovered in 1987, dates back to 3000 BC in the late Neolithic Age, and was used for about 1,500 years by the nearby village to which it belonged, from the Ozieri culture period until that of Bonnannaro.

== Grave goods ==
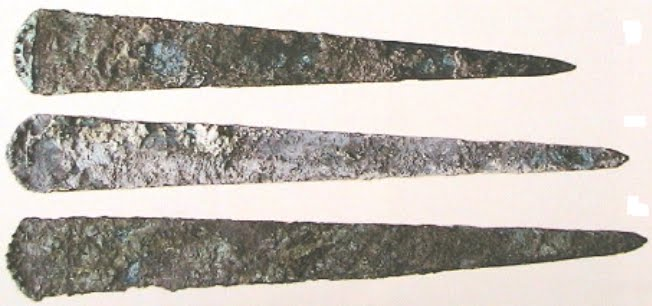
Swords from Sant'Iroxi

It owes its name (Tomb of the warriors) to the large number of skeletons (more than 200), deposited in 13 chronological strata, and for the rich military kit, dated to c. 1650-1600 BC, which includes swords and daggers of arsenical copper (19 in all). The swords and triangular blades range in length from 27 up to 66 cm and show some similarities to the swords of the El Argar culture (southeastern Spain). The kit is kept at the National Archaeological Museum of Cagliari.

== Bibliography ==
- Ugas, Giovanni (1990). La tomba dei guerrieri di Decimoputzu (in Italian). Cagliari: Edizioni della Torre. ISBN 6600001364.
