= Decimoputzu =

Decimoputzu Deximeputzu / Déximu de Putzu (Sardinian)
- Comune
- Comune di Decimoputzu
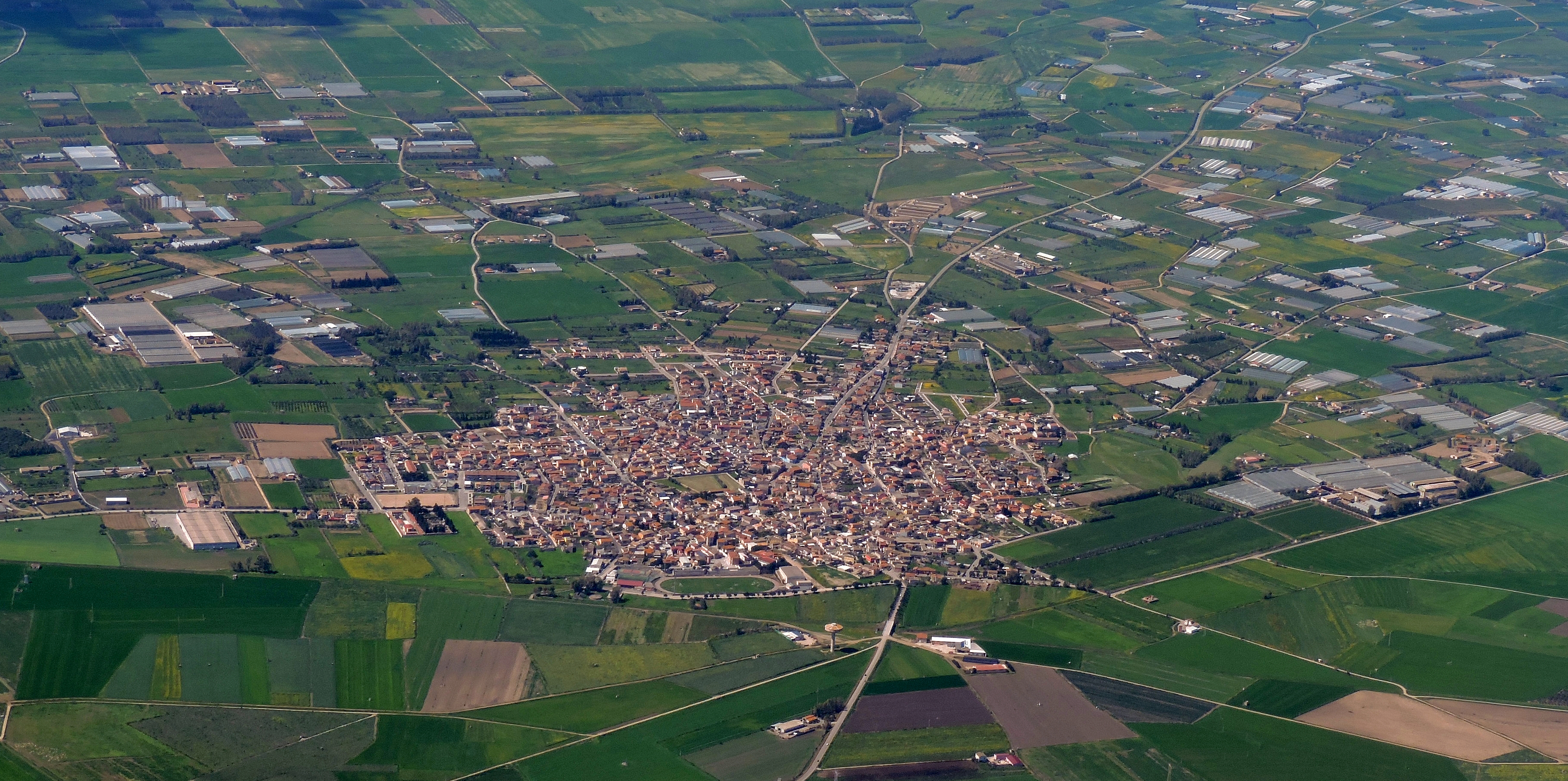

- Coat of arms

- Location within Sardinia
- Coordinates: 39°20′N 8°55′E
- Country: Italy
- Region: Sardinia
- Metropolitan city: Cagliari (CA)

Government
  - Mayor: Antonino Munzittu

Area
  - Total: 44.8 km^{2} (17.3 sq mi)
- Elevation: 17 m (56 ft)

Population (30 November 2010)
  - Total: 4,272
  - Density: 95.4/km^{2} (247/sq mi)
- Demonym: Putzesi
- Time zone: UTC+1 (CET)
  - Summer (DST): UTC+2 (CEST)
- Postal code: 09010
- Dialing code: 070
- Patron saint: Madonna delle Grazie

Decimoputzu (Sardinian: Deximuputzu or Deximu de Putzu) is a comune (municipality) of about 4,000 inhabitants in the Metropolitan City of Cagliari in the Italian region Sardinia, located about 20 kilometres (12 mi) northwest of Cagliari.

Decimoputzu borders the following municipalities: Decimomannu, Siliqua, Vallermosa, Villasor, Villaspeciosa.

== See also ==
- Casteddu de Fanaris
- Hypogeum of Sant'Iroxi
