= Pre-Nuragic Sardinia =

Period in the prehistory of Sardinia

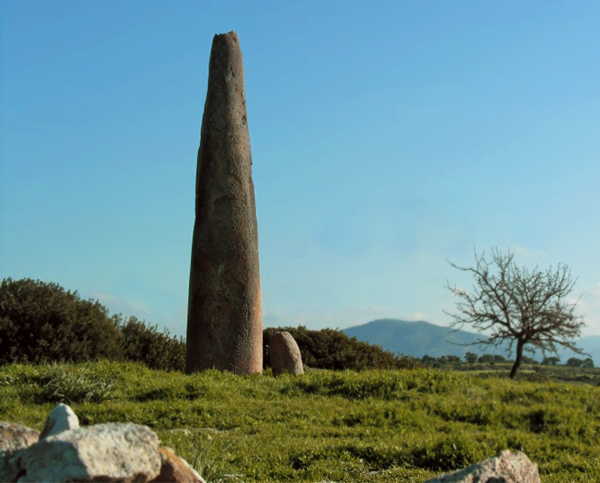
Menhir of monte Corru Tundu, Villa Sant'Antonio

The Pre-Nuragic period refers to the prehistory of Sardinia from the Paleolithic until the middle Bronze Age, when the Nuragic civilization flourished on the island.

Since writing had not yet been invented, the only source of information on man's lifestyles in this period is therefore archaeological data. In particular, objects, artefacts, tangible traces that present characteristics that can be considered an expression of the material culture of a population or ethnic group.

== Paleolithic ==
The discovery of Paleolithic lithic workshops indicate a human presence in Sardinia in the period between 450,000 and 10,000 years ago.

According to the researchers, a hominid nicknamed "Nur" was the first to colonize the current territory of the island about 250,000 years ago, in the Lower Paleolithic; based on studies of a phalanx found in the Nùrighe caves of Cheremule, the researchers supposed that he may have been a pre-Neanderthal, but some have expressed doubts, assuming a morphological distance from hominids.

During the last ice age sea levels were lower by about 130 meters; at that time Sardinia and Corsica formed a single large island, separated from Tuscany only by a narrow arm of sea.

The oldest remains of Homo sapiens in Sardinia date back to the Upper Paleolithic; their tracks have been found in the central part of Sardinia in the "Corbeddu cave" of Oliena.

== Mesolithic ==
Mesolithic human remains have been found at the "Su Coloru cave" of Laerru, in northern Sardinia (Anglona). The material culture suggest that these people came to Sardinia from the Italian Peninsula after a difficult navigation with rudimentary boats.

The oldest complete human skeleton (renamed "Amsicora") was found in 2011 in the territory of Arbus, it dates back to about 7,000 BC, the period of transition between the Mesolithic and the Neolithic.

Obsidian trade in prehistory. The Monte Arci (province of Oristano) was one of the most important sources of this material in the western Mediterranean region

== Neolithic ==
=== Su Carroppu culture ===
The culture of Su Carroppu represents the earliest phase of the Neolithic in Sardinia (6th millennium BC). Since 1968, the excavations carried out by archaeologists Enrico Atzeni and Gérard Bailloud in a rock shelter on the limestone hills in the territory of Sirri called "Su Carroppu", found various coarse ceramics of a black-grey color decorated with the imprint of Cerastoderma edule along with tools made of obsidian from the Monte Arci.

There were also found the remains of ancient meals, with the discovery of bones of animals such as deer, Prolagus sardus, wild boar, thus documenting an economy based on farming, hunting and fishing. The presence of two human skeletons, along with ornaments made of shells, according to the researchers witnessed the customs of burial cave.

The culture of Su Carroppu has correspondence in Corsica, the Italian Peninsula and the Iberian Peninsula, but especially the findings in Sardinia and Corsica confirm the key role of these two islands to understanding the neolithization of the north-west Mediterranean Sea.

=== Grotta Verde culture ===
The Grotta Verde culture is named after a cave located at Capo Caccia near Alghero, where important finds were made in 1979. It has been dated to the second phase of the Early Neolithic in the mid-fifth millennium BC .

This culture was present in the north-west part of Sardinia and was characterized by the production of refined pottery, decorated with a toothed tool .

On a vase found in the cave the handles depicted, in a stylized manner, human heads with small nose, eyes and mouth played. According to archaeologist Giovanni Lilliu, this would be the first anthropomorphic representation in Sardinian prehistory.

On a wall inside the cave unusual graffiti were also found - another singular testimony to these people.

=== Filiestru culture ===
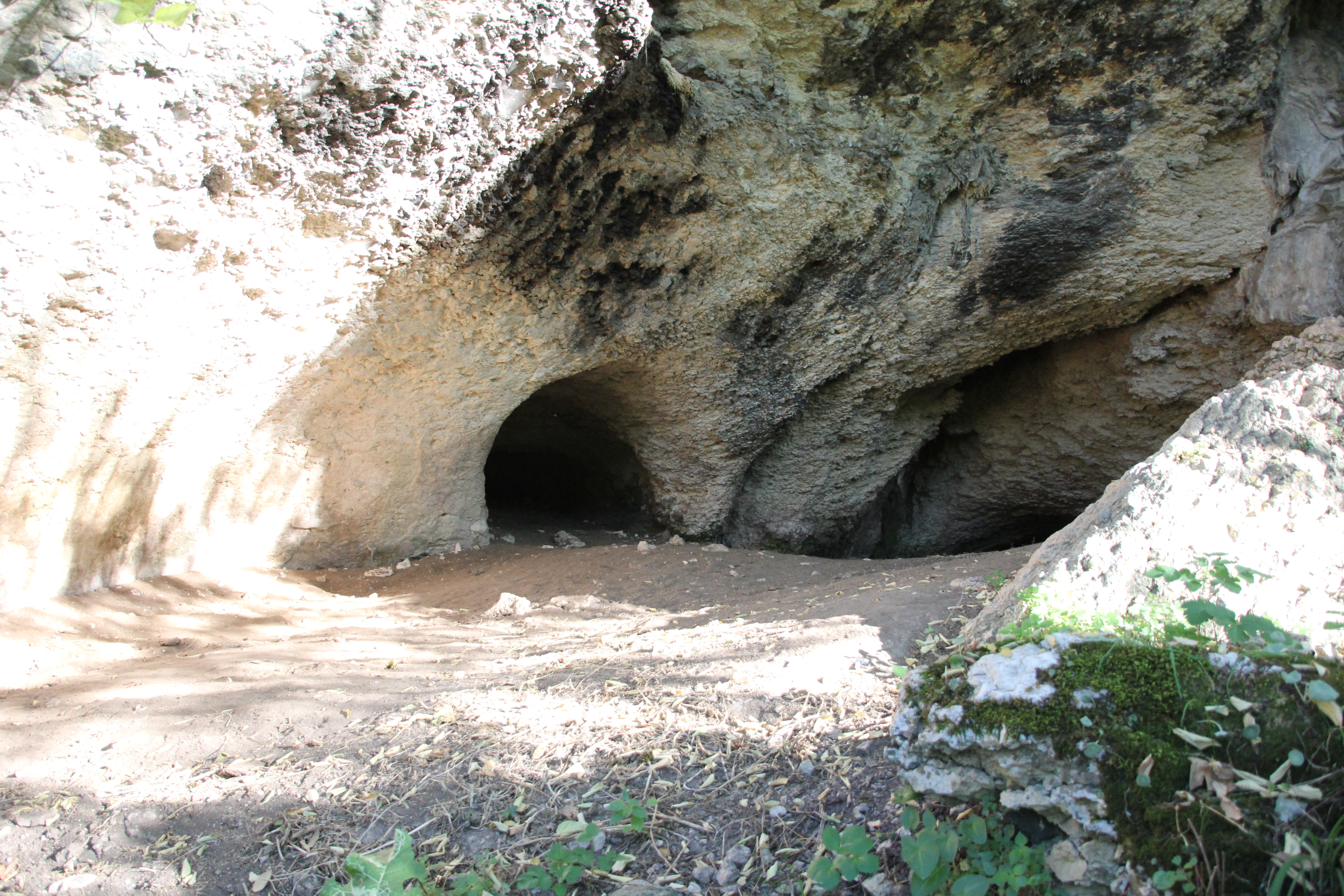
Mara, Filiestru cave

In 1971 the priest and caver Renato Loria found in the territory of Mara, between Villanova Monteleone and Bosa, a ravine of about sixty square meters. The cave was subsequently investigated by the archaeologists VR Switsur and David H. Trump, who discovered a sequence of different cultures spread over a very long period of time.

The oldest of these cultures has been dated to the late fifth millennium BC; findings show that this culture was developed by people dedicated to agriculture, husbandry, hunting and fishing. The researchers noted the almost complete disappearance of the earlier forms of pottery decoration and the appearance of large greenstone rings, also common in Corsica and the Italian peninsula. These findings led the researchers to argue that during that period the Sardinian populations had close trade relations with the Mediterranean Neolithic communities of southern France, the Iberian Peninsula, the Italian peninsula and Sicily.

=== Bonu Ighinu culture ===
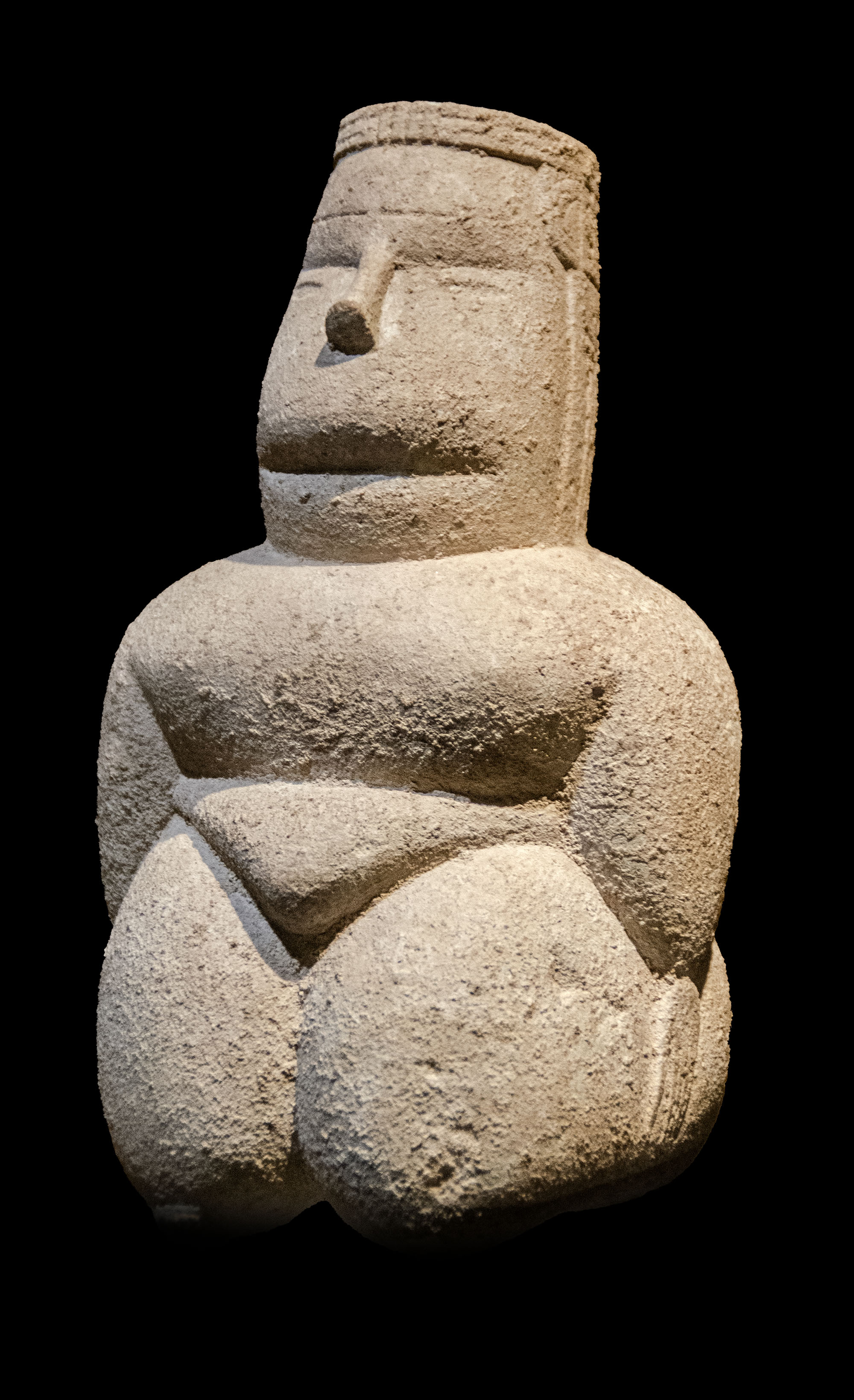
Mother Goddess from Cuccuru s'Arrius, Cabras

The Bonu Ighinu culture prevailed from 4000 BC up to 3400 BC . It takes its name from the "Sanctuary of Our Lady of Bonu Ighinu" ("good neighbor" in Sardinian language), in the municipality of Mara, near which is the "cave of de Tintirriolu", a place in which were discovered a considerable amount of pottery with zoomorphic and anthropomorphic handles. It spread widely throughout most of the island and one of the most important villages was that of "Puisteris" in Mogoro.

It is regarded by archaeologists as the first culture in Sardinia using artificial cavities as graves and is the natural evolution of the previous Filiestru culture, whose cave is located in the same area.

The artifacts related to the village and necropolis of "Cuccuru S'Arrius" show a well-organized society. At this site there have been numerous discoveries of female figurines depicting the so-called "Mother Goddess", whose postulated worship was widespread in much of Europe and in the Mediterranean during the Neolithic, represented in many different ways: standing, sitting, or while breastfeeding. The site "Cuccuru S'Arrius" is indicated by many scholars belonging to the culture of San Ciriaco.

=== San Ciriaco culture ===
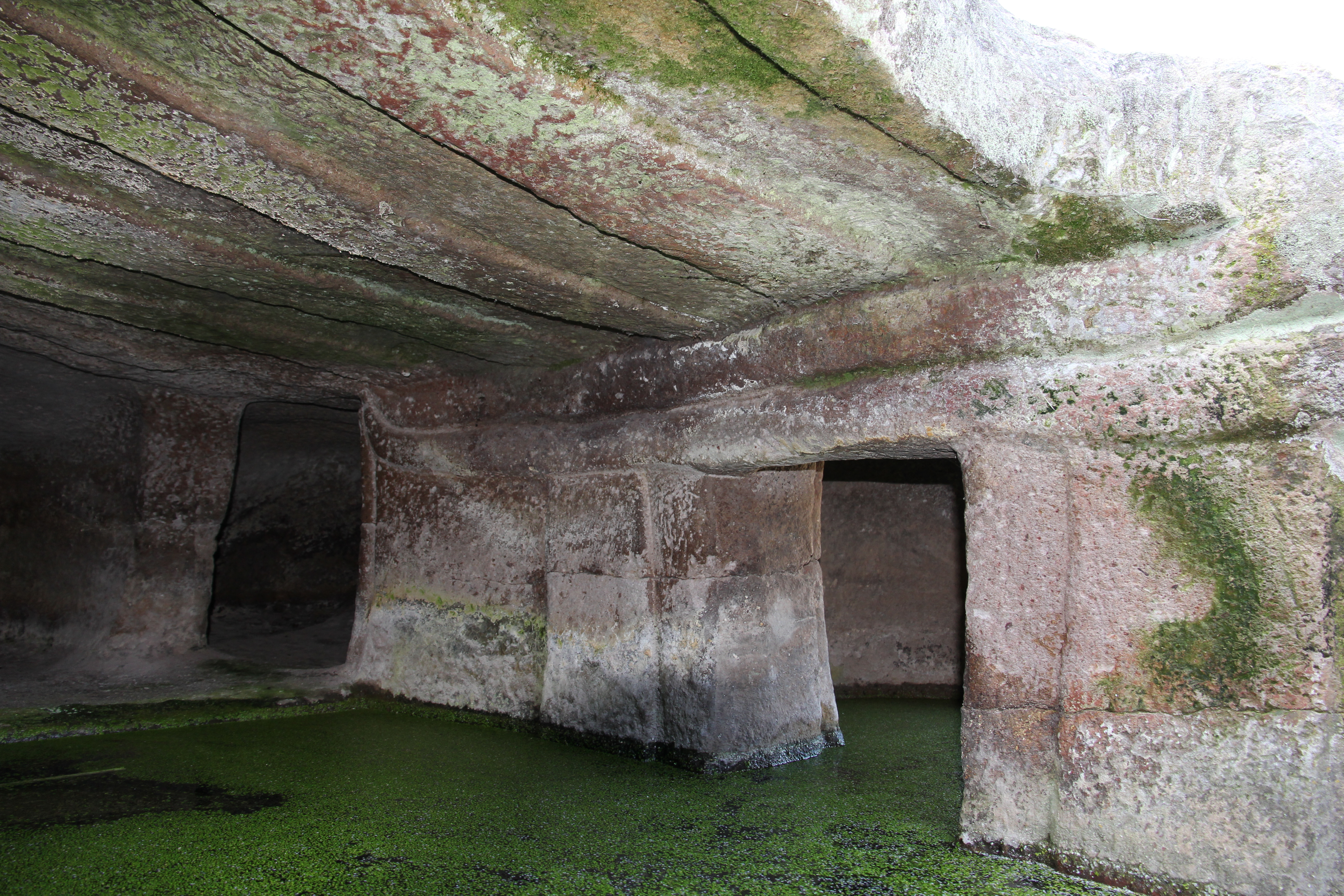
Domus de Janas of Su Murrone, Chiaramonti

The San Ciriaco culture (3400-3200 BC) characterizes the end of the Middle Neolithic. It is regarded by archaeologists as a cultural link between the Bonuighinu and the Ozieri and is currently undergoing an exact definition.

It takes its name from the Church of St Cyriacus of Terralba, a municipality in the province of Oristano, near which was found a prehistoric village full of evidences.

During this phase were built the first Domus de Janas, a type of hypogean tomb that will spread throughout the island, with the exception of Gallura.

=== Arzachena culture ===
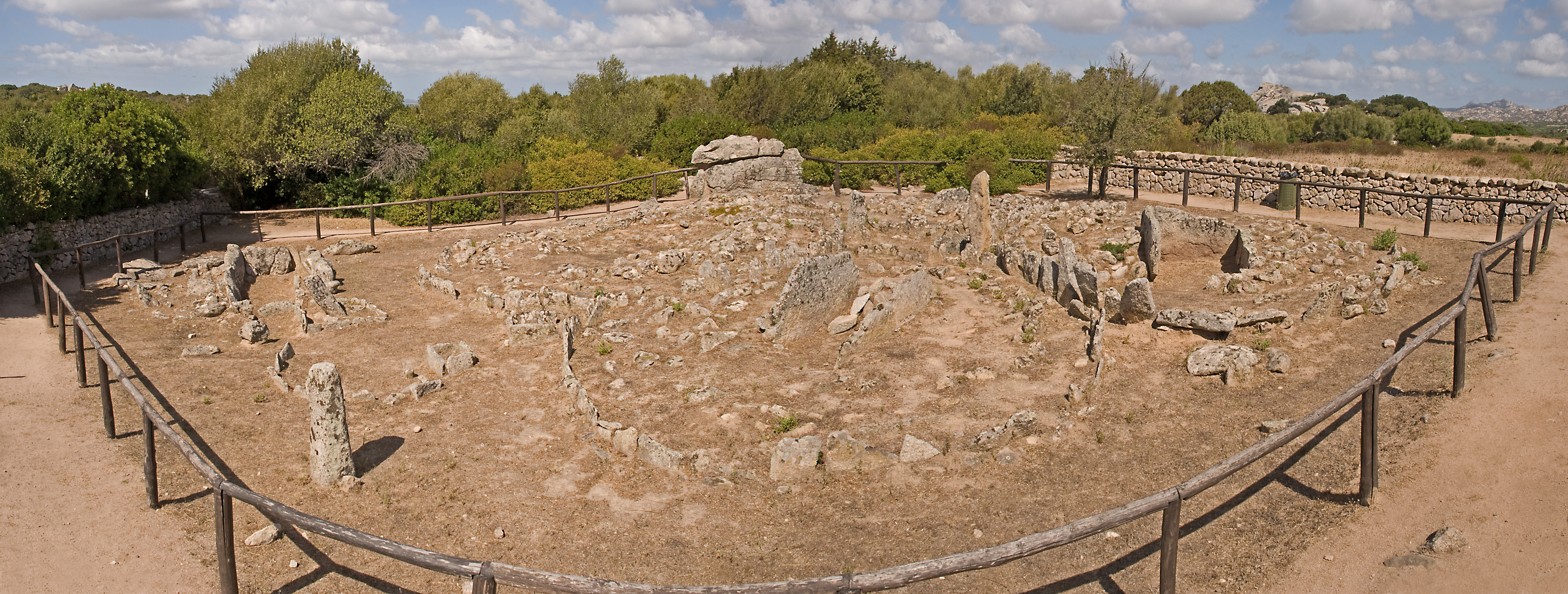
Circular graves at Li Muri, Arzachena

The Arzachena culture interested mainly the Gallura region and some other eastern parts of the island with ramifications also in southern Corsica: for this reason it is also referred as "Corsican-Gallurese cultural aspect".

The large "circular graves" of Gallura mark the debut of the megalithism in Sardinia, one of the oldest in the western Mediterranean. The grave goods included items such as refined cups of soapstone, knives of flint, small triangular hatchets of hardstone and necklace of green soapstone.

=== Ozieri culture ===
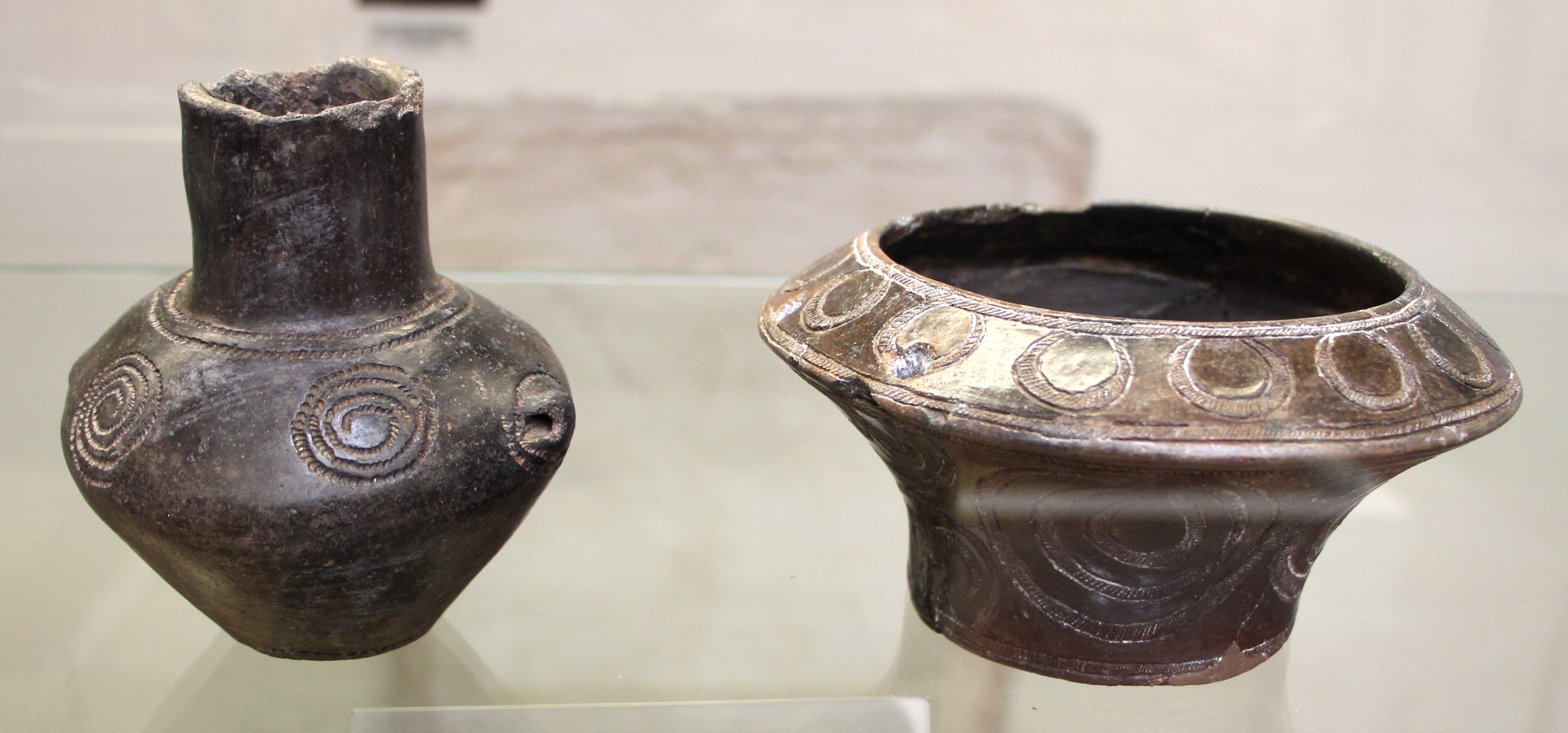
Pottery of the Ozieri culture

The Ozieri culture (3200-2700 BC), also known as the "culture of St. Michael", is named after the homonymous cave in the municipality of Ozieri where were found important evidences. In fact, in that site were found finely crafted vases, elegantly decorated with geometric designs incised on clay and painted with red ocher. The older are round in shape and just finished, while those of a later period are highly stylized and more refined.

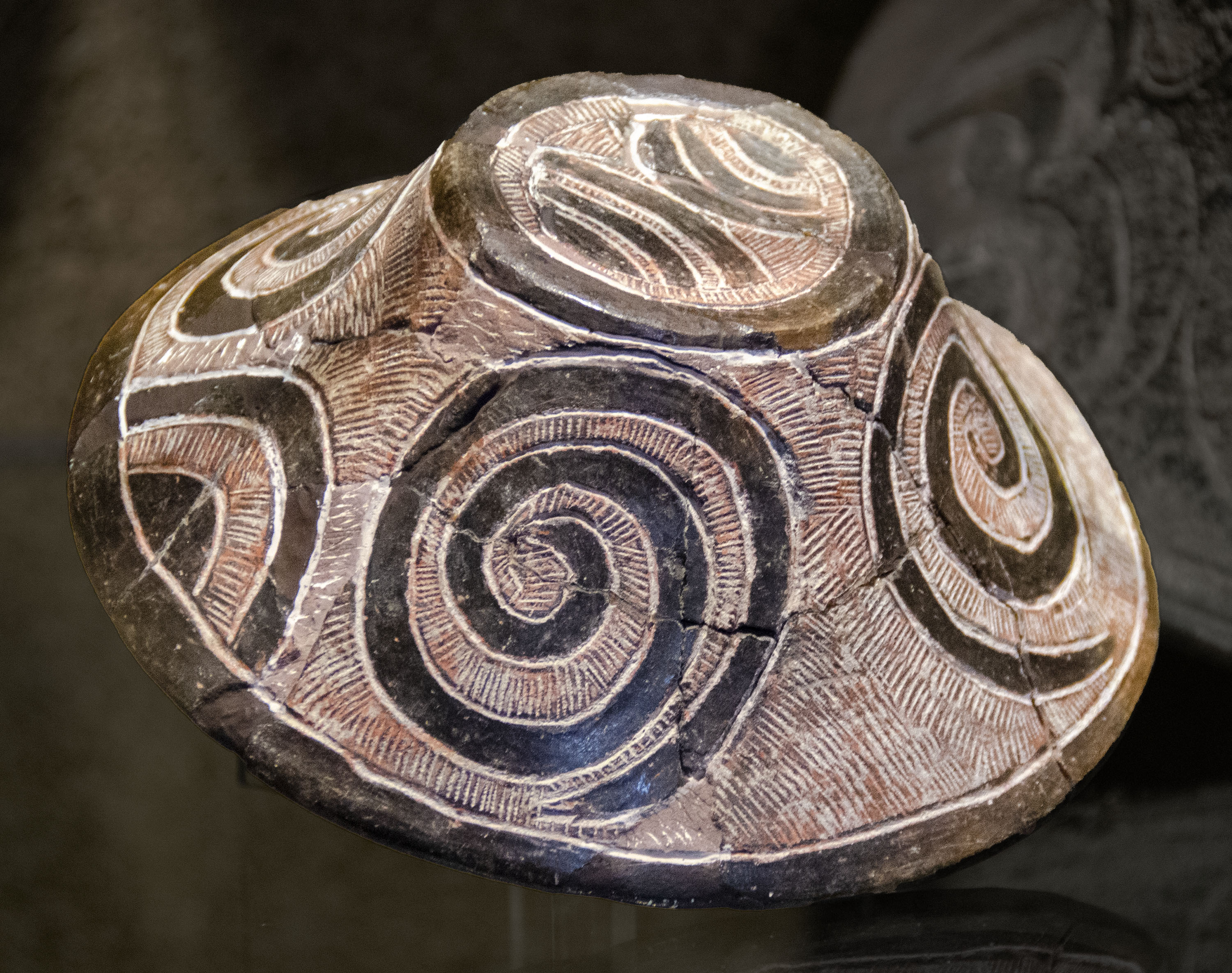
Cup

Scholars consider this type of pottery as new to the Neolithic Sardinia and until then similar artifacts were considered as typical of the Cyclades islands and Crete. As a result of significant trade with those distant islands, new manufacturing techniques, new knowledge in metallurgy and new lifestyles appeared in Sardinia. These findings demonstrated unequivocally the strong cultural and commercial exchange elapsed between the Sardinians pre-nuragic peoples and Neolithic Greece.

Based on these important findings scholars agree in defining the culture of Ozieri as the first great culture of Sardinia.

== Chalcolithic ==
=== Sub-Ozieri culture ===
The Sub-Ozieri culture (also called "Red Ozieri"), dated between 2850 and 2700 BC, is a continuation, particularly in the central and southern part of Sardinia, of the previous phase of the Late Neolithic.

Obsidian is now rarely used while metallurgy of copper and silver began to spread.

=== Abealzu-Filigosa culture ===
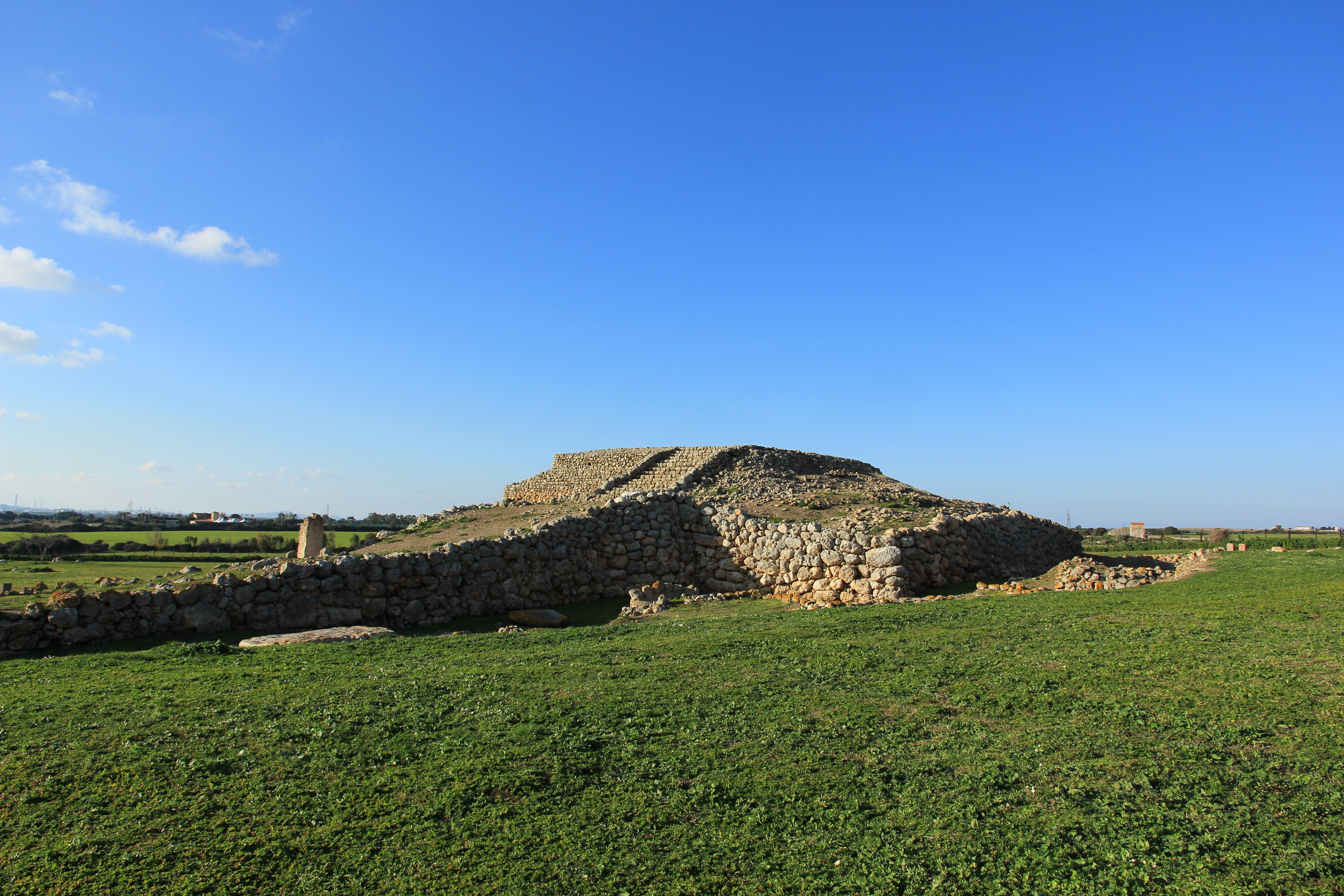
Monte d'Accoddi

The first place (Abealzu) is at Osilo, the second (Filigosa) at Macomer. This culture developed between 2700 and 2400 BC and was limited to about a dozen sites located in the area of Sassari and a few other in south-central Sardinia.

These populations deified their ancestors with the erection of the statue menhir (mainly located in the central-western Sardinia) and built or restored the large megalithic temple of Monte d'Accoddi, near Sassari, most likely dedicated to the Sun god.

Grave goods included weapons such as daggers of copper, stone hammer-axes and arrowheads of obsidian. Abelzu pottery show similarities with those of the Rinaldone culture.

=== Monte Claro culture ===
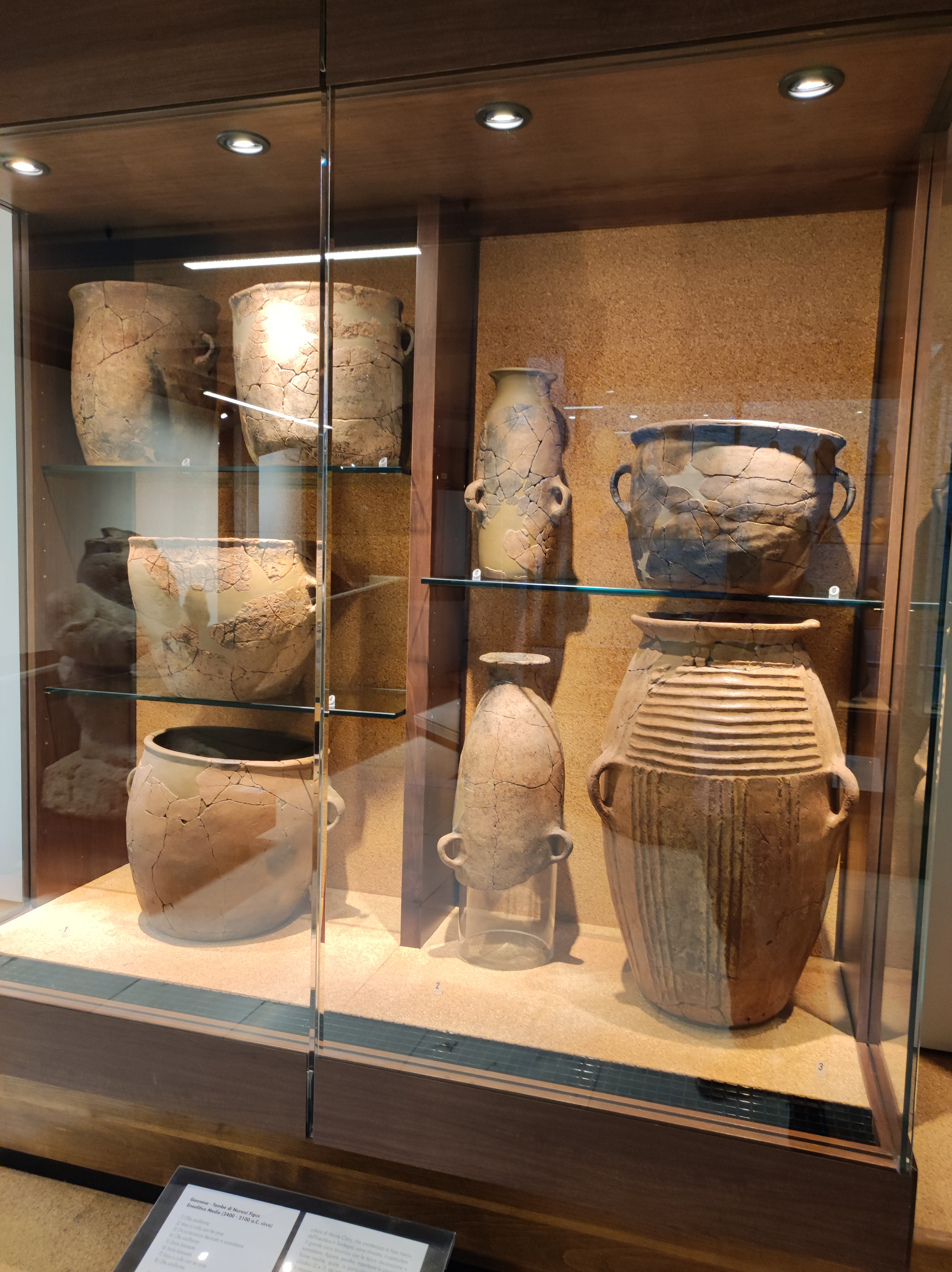
Pottery of the Monte Claro culture from Gonnesa (Nuraxi Figus)

The Monte Claro culture spread throughout the island between 2400 and 2100 BC. The main innovations are the "oven-shaped" tombs, individual graves that appeared in the Cagliari area, and the great megalithic walls of the central-northern part of the island like that of "Monte Baranta", near Olmedo.

The ceramics show eastern influences in the south and from the Fontbouisse culture (southern France) in the north.

=== Beaker culture ===
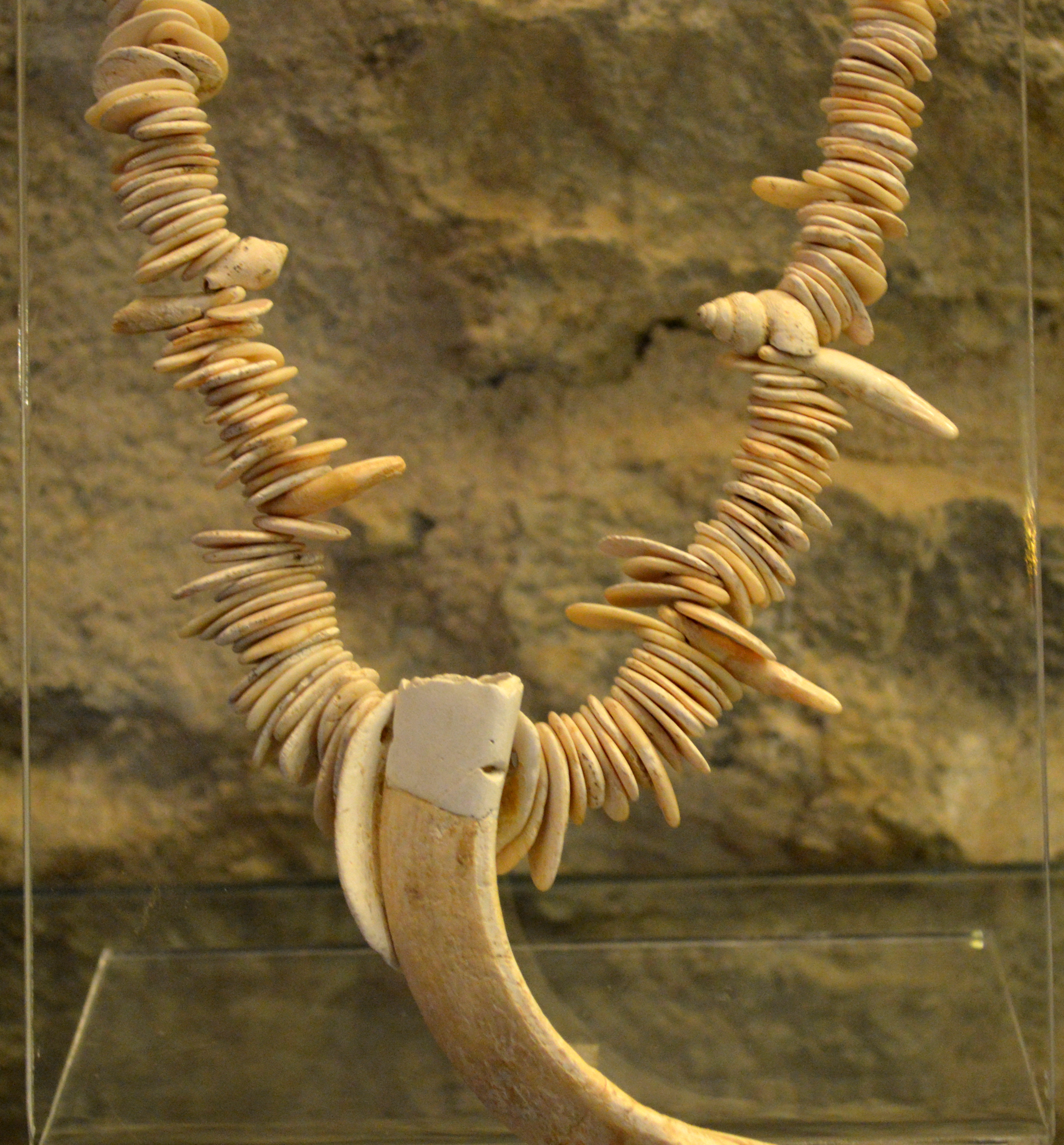
Necklace, museo di Villa Abbas, Sardara

The Beaker culture originated from outside the island; its populations mixed with people of the preceding indigenous cultures. It was diffused mainly along the west coast and the adjacent lowlands while finds in the east coast are scarce and concentrated mainly near Dorgali.

They are identifiable by the manufacturers of refined pottery, and by the use of stone wrist-guard, daggers of copper, bracelets, rings and necklaces of shells or tusks of animals. For the first time gold items appeared in island (Tomb of Bingia 'e Monti, Gonnostramatza).

The Beaker culture in Sardinia was divided in three phases:

- The older phase (2100–2000 BC) with strong Iberian and Provençal influences
- A second phase (2000–1900 BC) in which appear obvious influences from Central Europe
- A third phase (1900–1800 BC) documented in the sites of "Lu Marinaru" and "Padru Jossu" (Undecorated Beaker)

== Early Bronze Age ==
=== Bonnanaro culture ===
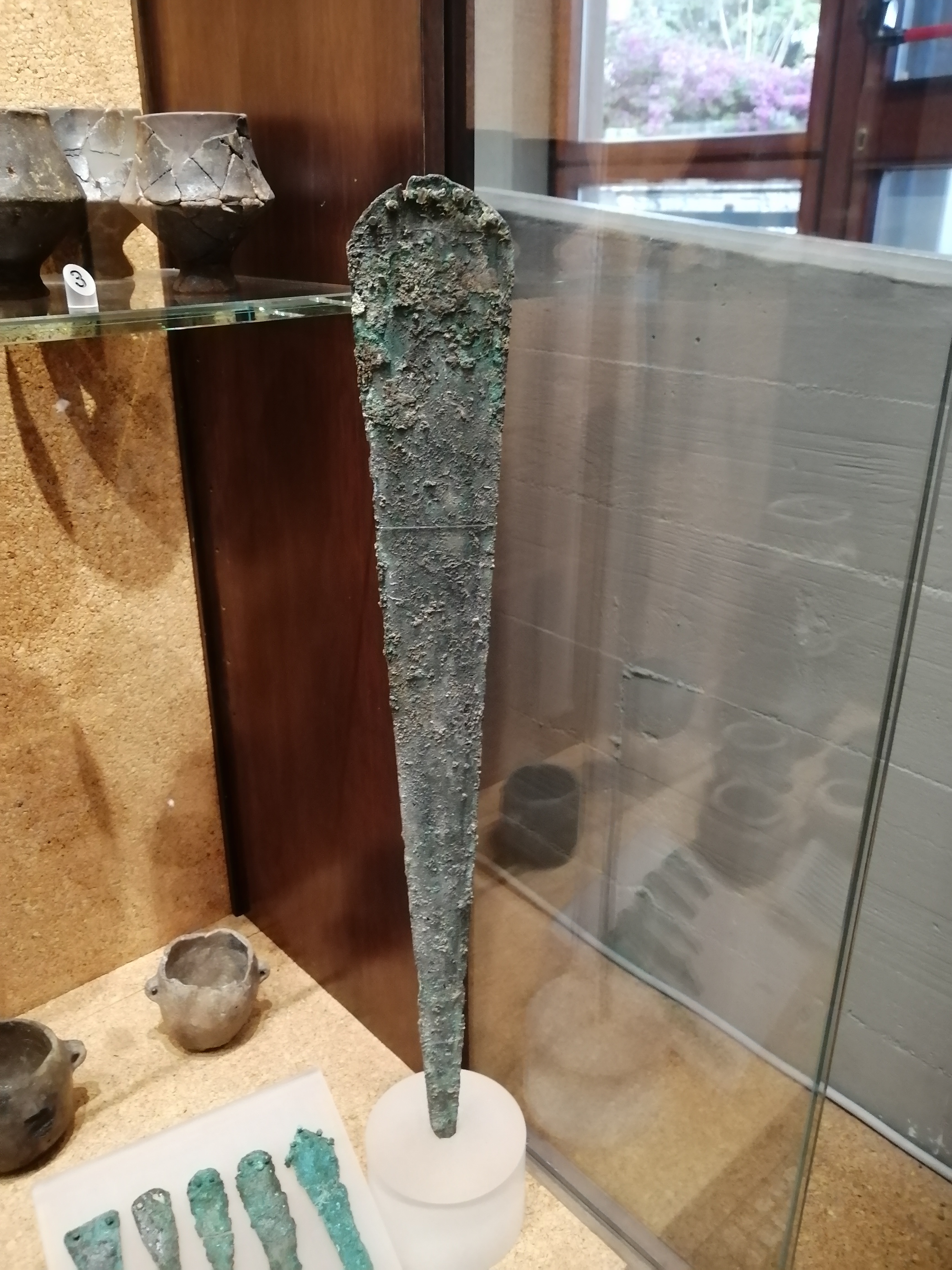
Bonnanaro A2 sword made of arsenical copper, from the Hypogeum of Sant'Iroxi, Decimoputzu

In 1800 B.C., the Bonnanaro culture, a regionalization of the previous Beaker culture with influences from the Polada culture of northern Italy, spread throughout the island.

They probably erected the first "protonuraghi" or "pseudonuraghi", but they are few in number compared to the total number of buildings. These "protonuraghi" constitute of a base with a corridor and a staircase to access the terrace.

== Genetics ==
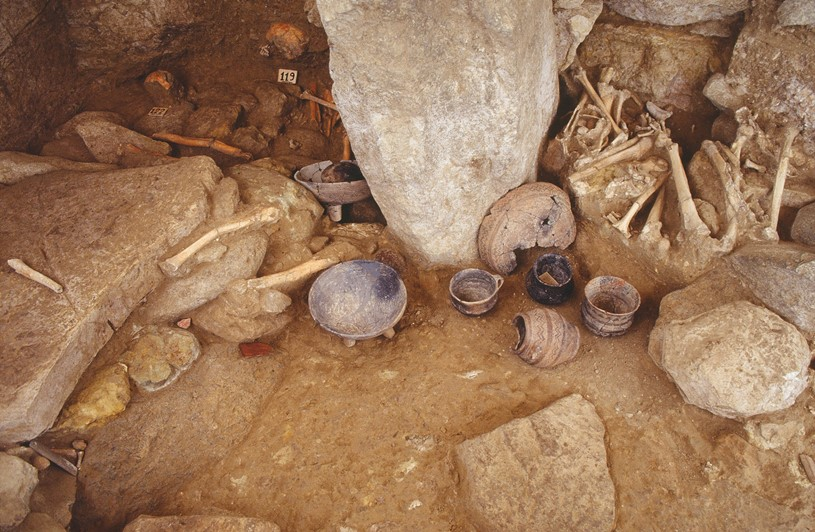
Tomb of Bingia 'e Monti, skeletal remains and Beaker pottery

According to modern archaeogenetic investigations (2020) the Neolithic Sardinians showed a greater affinity with the cardial populations of Iberia and Southern France. In the following Chalcolithic period there is substantial genetic continuity and the proportions of the ancestral components of the Western Hunter-Gatherers and of Early European Farmers remain stable, at ~17% and ~83% respectively. Similarly to the Iberian peninsula and Sicily, and in contrast to central-northern Europe, no significant amount of genes attributable to migrations from the Pontic-Caspian steppe have been identified in Sardinian Beaker individuals.

A 2022 study by Manjusha Chintalapati, Nick Patterson, and Priya Moorjania detected instead an early, modest gene flow from the Western Steppe Herders around 2600 BC.

Phenotypically Pre-Nuragic Sardinians were predominantly brown eyed, dark brown or black haired and with intermediate or mixed skin tone.

== See also ==
- Paleolithic Europe
- Neolithic Europe
- Chalcolithic Europe
- Neolithic Italy

== Literature ==
- Atzeni E., La preistoria del Sulcis-Iglesiente, AA.VV., Iglesias. Storia e Società, Iglesias, 1987
- AA.VV., Carbonia e il Sulcis. Archeologia e territorio, a cura di V. Santoni, Oristano, 1995.
- AA.VV., Ichnussa. La Sardegna dalle origini all'età classica, Milano, 1981.
- AA.VV. La civiltà in Sardegna nei secoli - Torino - Edizioni ERI.
- Barreca F., L'esplorazione topografica della regione sulcitana, Monte Sirai III, 1966
- AA.VV., La Sardegna preistorica. Storia, materiali, monumenti, 2017
- Brigaglia M., Mastino A., Ortu G. Storia della Sardegna 1. Dalle origini al Settecento, Bari, 2006.
- Casula F.C., La storia di Sardegna - Sassari 1994.
- Contu E., Monte d'Accoddi (Sassari). Problematiche di studio e di ricerca di un singolare monumento preistorico Deja Conference, BAR. s. 288. Oxford. (1984)
- Lilliu G., La civiltà dei Sardi dal neolitico all'età dei nuraghi. Torino - Edizioni ERI - 1967.
- Lilliu G., Sculture della Sardegna nuragica Verona 1962.
- Lo Schiavo F., L. Usai, Testimonianze cultuali di età nuragica: la grotta Pirosu in località Su Benatzu di Santadi
- Sirigu R., Archeologia preistorica e protostorica della Sardegna. Introduzione allo studio, Cagliari, CUEC, 2009.
- Tine S., Monte d'Accoddi 10 anni di nuovi scavi. - Sassari - 1992.
- Ugas, G. (2005). L'alba dei Nuraghi. Cagliari.
- G. Webster and M. Webster (2017). Punctuated Insularity. The Archaeology of 4th and 3rd millennium Sardinia, Oxford: BAR International Series 2871
- Gary Webster (2019). The Sardinian Neolithic: An Archaeology of the 6th and 5th Millennia BCE. BAR int. Ser. 2941. Oxford: BAR Publishing.
