= Vallermosa =

Vallermosa Biddaramosa
- Comune
- Comune di Vallermosa
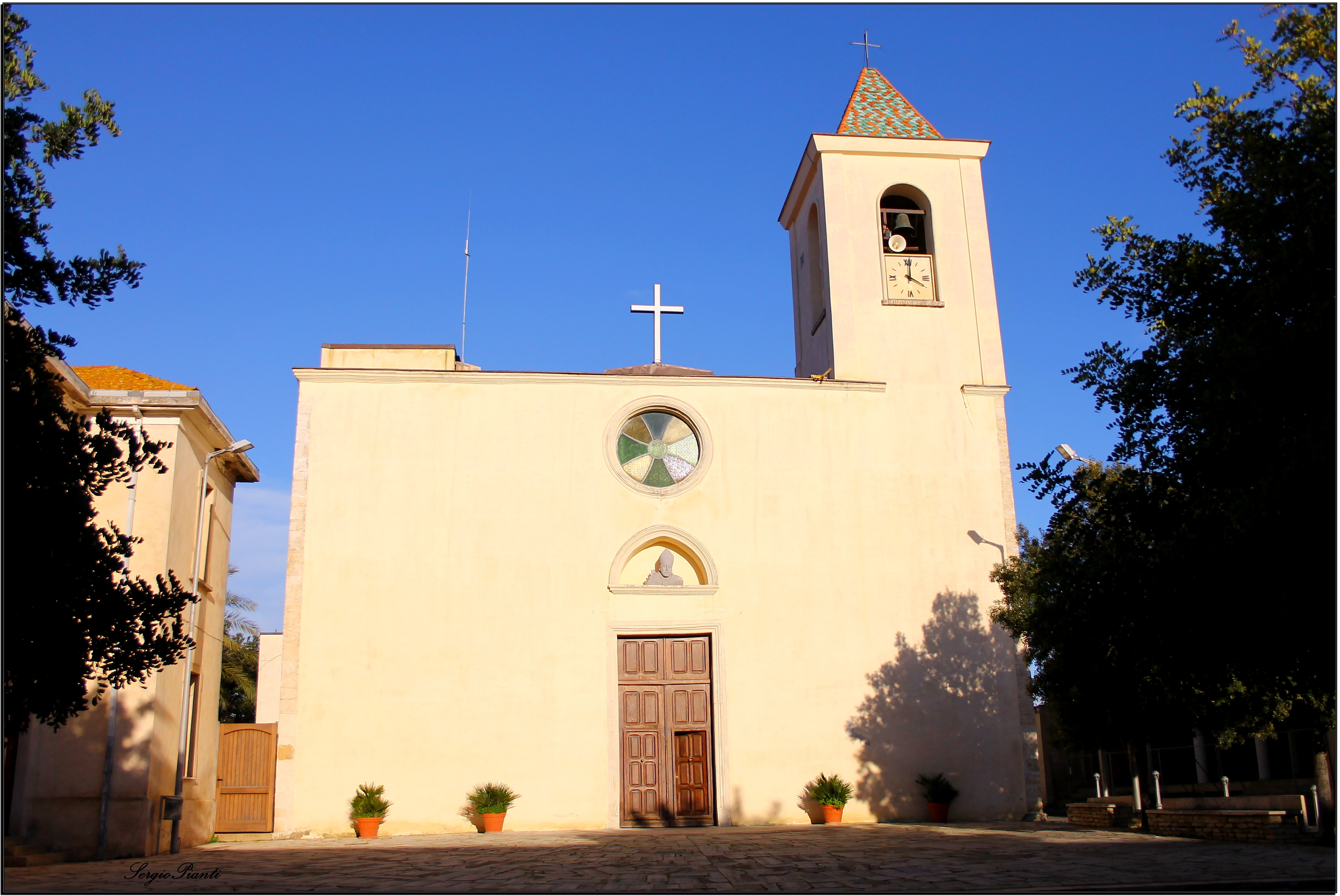

- Location within Sardinia
- Coordinates: 39°22′N 8°48′E
- Country: Italy
- Region: Sardinia
- Metropolitan city: Cagliari (CA)

Area
  - Total: 61.8 km^{2} (23.9 sq mi)

Population (Dec. 2004)
  - Total: 1,995
  - Density: 32.3/km^{2} (83.6/sq mi)
- Demonym: Vallermosesi
- Time zone: UTC+1 (CET)
  - Summer (DST): UTC+2 (CEST)
- Postal code: 09010
- Dialing code: 0781

Vallermosa (Sardinian: Biddaramosa) is a comune (municipality) in the Metropolitan City of Cagliari in the Italian region Sardinia, located about 30 kilometres (19 mi) northwest of Cagliari. As of 31 December 2004, it had a population of 1,995 and an area of 61.8 square kilometres (23.9 mi^{2}).

Vallermosa borders the following municipalities: Decimoputzu, Iglesias, Siliqua, Villacidro, Villasor.

== Climate ==
Climate data for Vallermosa (1981-2010)
| Month | Jan | Feb | Mar | Apr | May | Jun | Jul | Aug | Sep | Oct | Nov | Dec | Year |
|---|---|---|---|---|---|---|---|---|---|---|---|---|---|
| Mean daily maximum °C (°F) | 15.4 (59.7) | 16.4 (61.5) | 19.2 (66.6) | 21.3 (70.3) | 26.4 (79.5) | 31.5 (88.7) | 34.9 (94.8) | 35.3 (95.5) | 30.1 (86.2) | 25.5 (77.9) | 19.6 (67.3) | 16.0 (60.8) | 24.3 (75.7) |
| Mean daily minimum °C (°F) | 4.5 (40.1) | 4.5 (40.1) | 6.3 (43.3) | 8.4 (47.1) | 12.3 (54.1) | 16.2 (61.2) | 18.7 (65.7) | 19.4 (66.9) | 16.9 (62.4) | 13.9 (57.0) | 9.1 (48.4) | 5.9 (42.6) | 11.3 (52.3) |
| Average precipitation mm (inches) | 63.8 (2.51) | 62.1 (2.44) | 48.7 (1.92) | 55.3 (2.18) | 29.2 (1.15) | 13.8 (0.54) | 4.2 (0.17) | 12.1 (0.48) | 41.2 (1.62) | 54.4 (2.14) | 88.9 (3.50) | 82.0 (3.23) | 555.8 (21.88) |
Source: Climatologia della Sardegna per il trentennio 1981-2010

== Demographic evolution ==
Historical population

| Year | Pop. | ±% |
|---|---|---|
| 1861 | 1,270 | — |
| 1871 | 1,329 | +4.6% |
| 1881 | 1,447 | +8.9% |
| 1901 | 1,364 | −5.7% |
| 1911 | 1,459 | +7.0% |

| Year | Pop. | ±% |
|---|---|---|
| 1921 | 1,519 | +4.1% |
| 1931 | 1,512 | −0.5% |
| 1936 | 1,556 | +2.9% |
| 1951 | 2,032 | +30.6% |
| 1961 | 2,025 | −0.3% |

| Year | Pop. | ±% |
|---|---|---|
| 1971 | 1,909 | −5.7% |
| 1981 | 1,912 | +0.2% |
| 1991 | 2,092 | +9.4% |
| 2001 | 2,010 | −3.9% |

Source: Data from ISTAT
