= Monte Claro culture =

Chalcolithic culture on the island of Sardinia

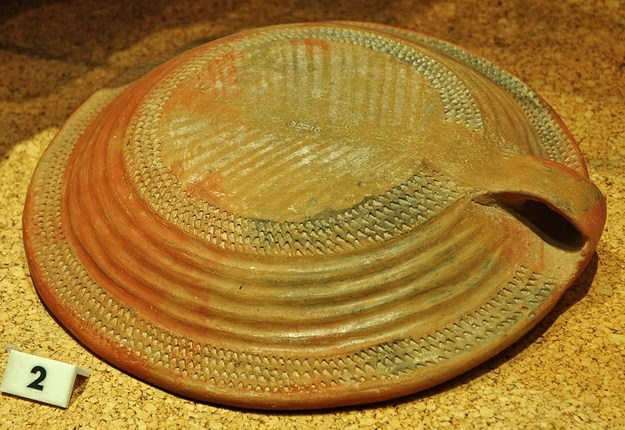
Monte Claro pottery

The Monte Claro culture was a Chalcolithic culture that spread throughout the island of Sardinia around the second half of the 3rd millennium BC (2400-2100 BC). It takes its name from a hill located in the city of Cagliari, where important discoveries were made.

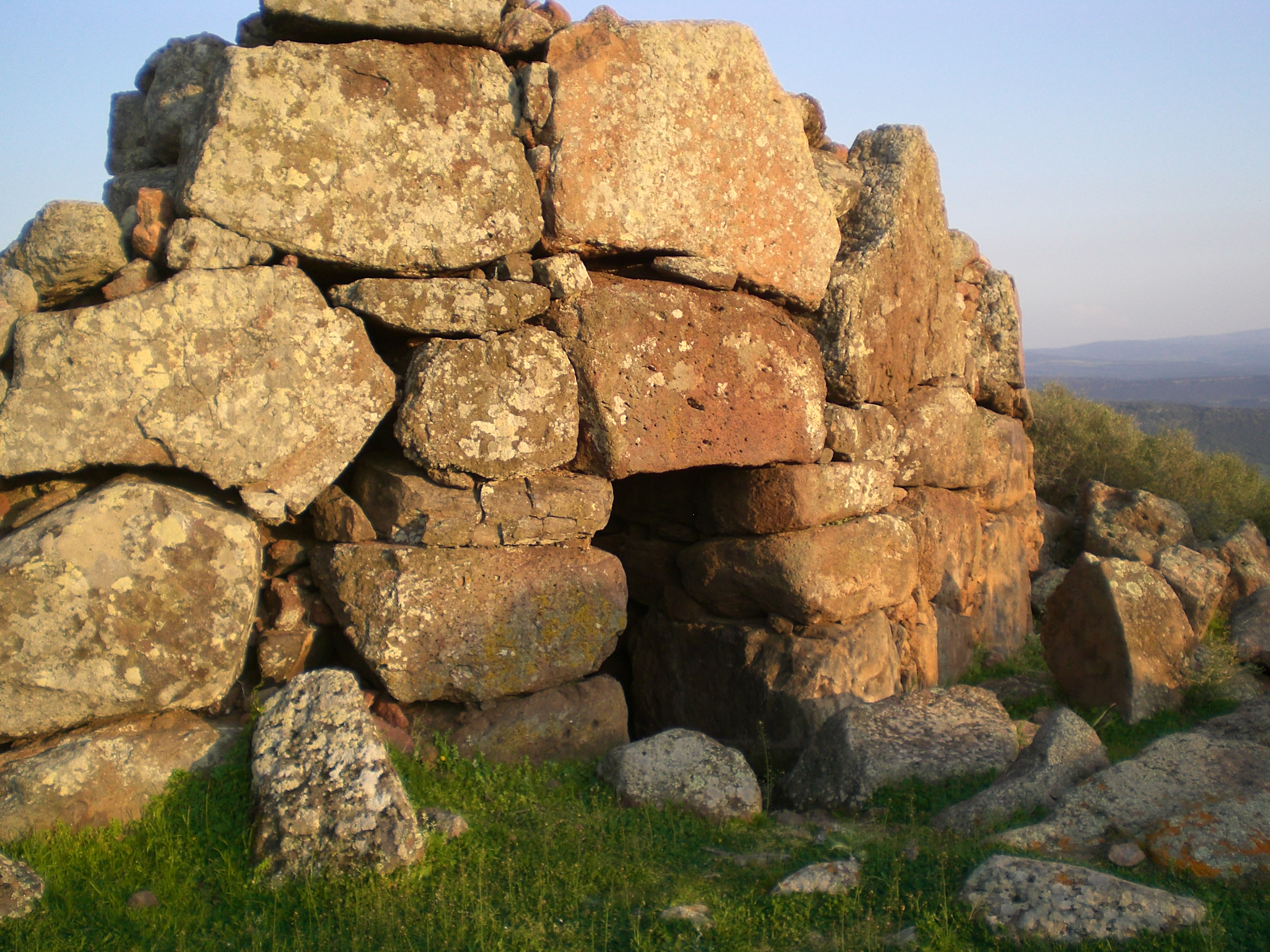
Monte Baranta

Archaeologists divide the Monte Claro culture into four facies: Sassari, Nuoro, Campidano, Oristanese. Within each facies there are recognizable peculiarities that concern not only the material culture (ceramics, metallurgy and so on) but also the religious sphere and the settlement patterns. Characteristics of southern Sardinia are a variety of tomb types, including "oven-tombs", while in northern Sardinia appeared for the first time large megalithic defensive walls, one of which is that of Monte Baranta near Olmedo.

Its spread appears to have occurred through a slow expansion, which started from the South to the North of the island. The settlements were often made up of houses with a rectangular or trapezoidal plant, which sometimes comprised different rooms. There is evidence of urban planning in some of the settlements.

== Gallery ==
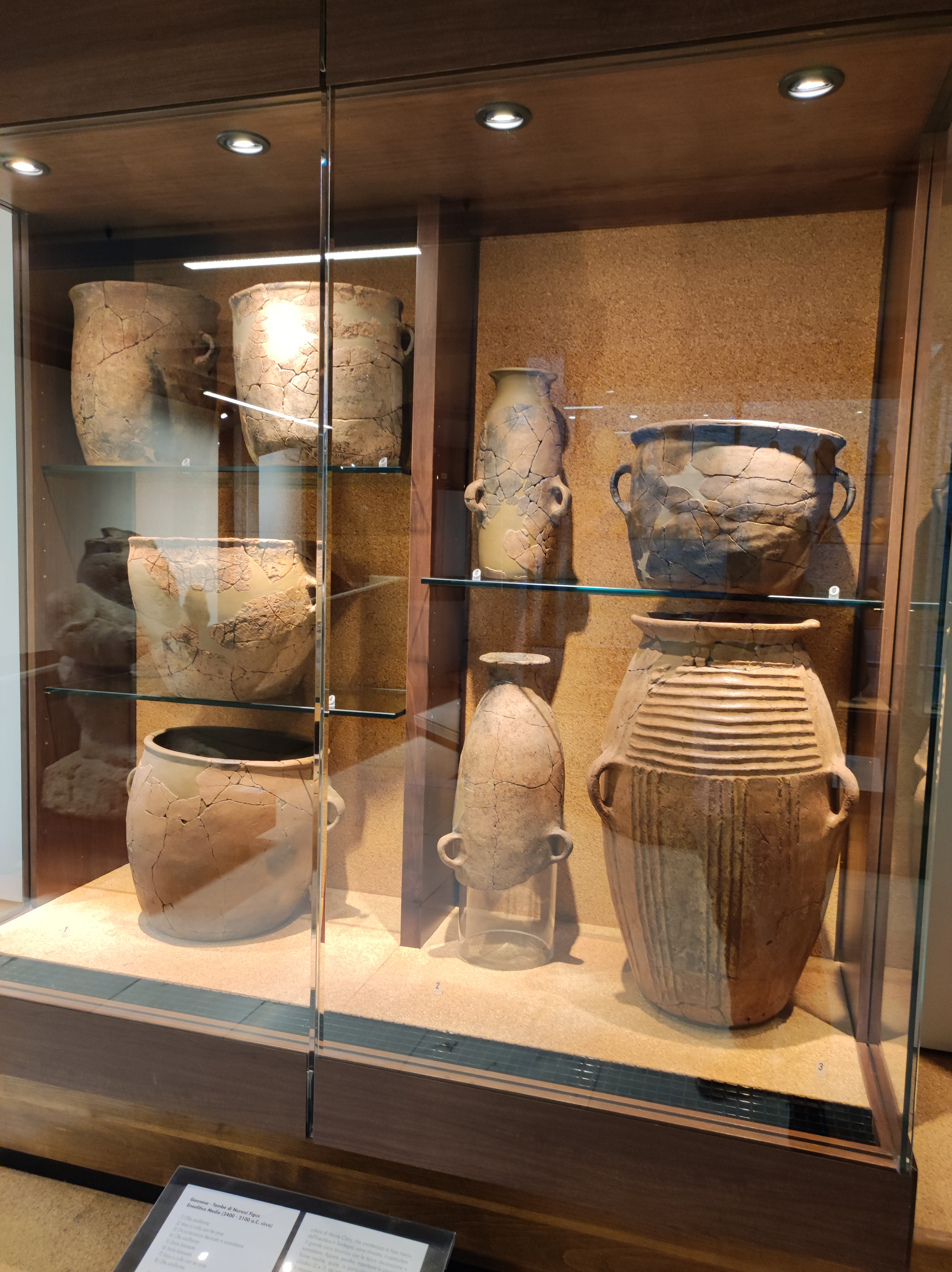
Pottery

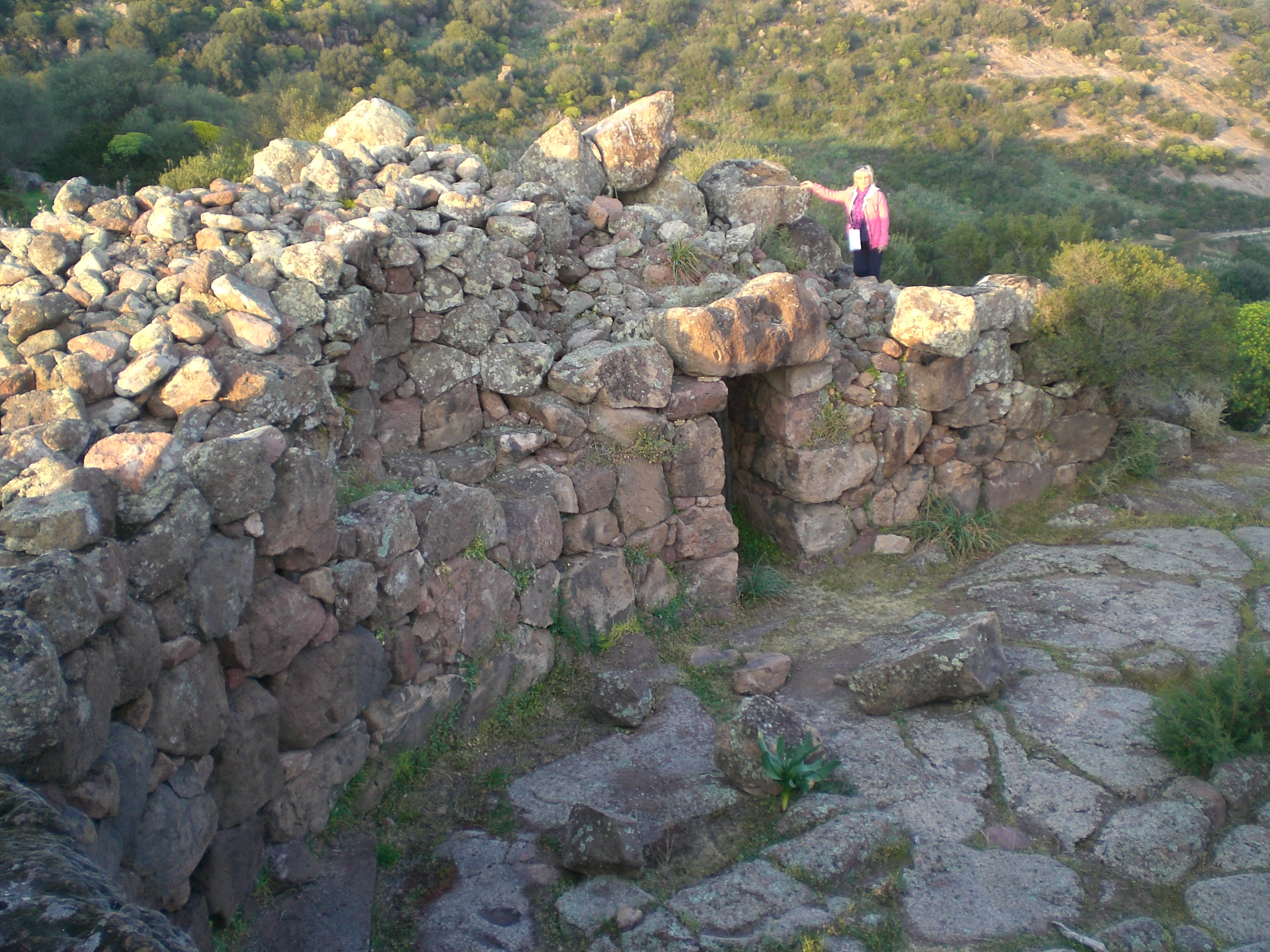
Olmedo, Monte Baranta

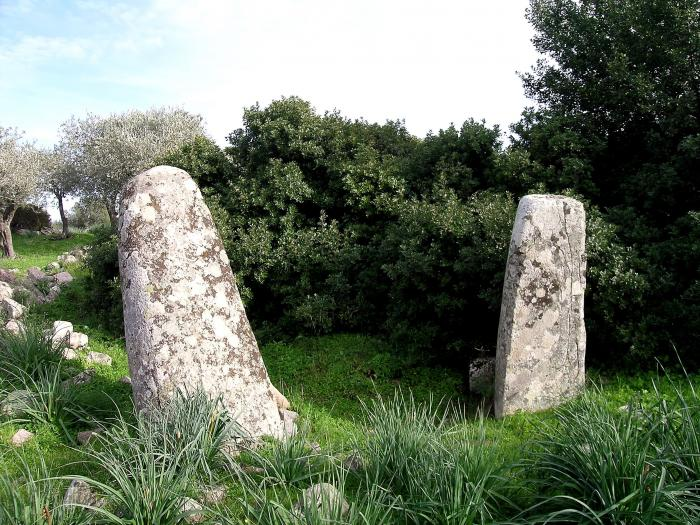
Oliena, Birai

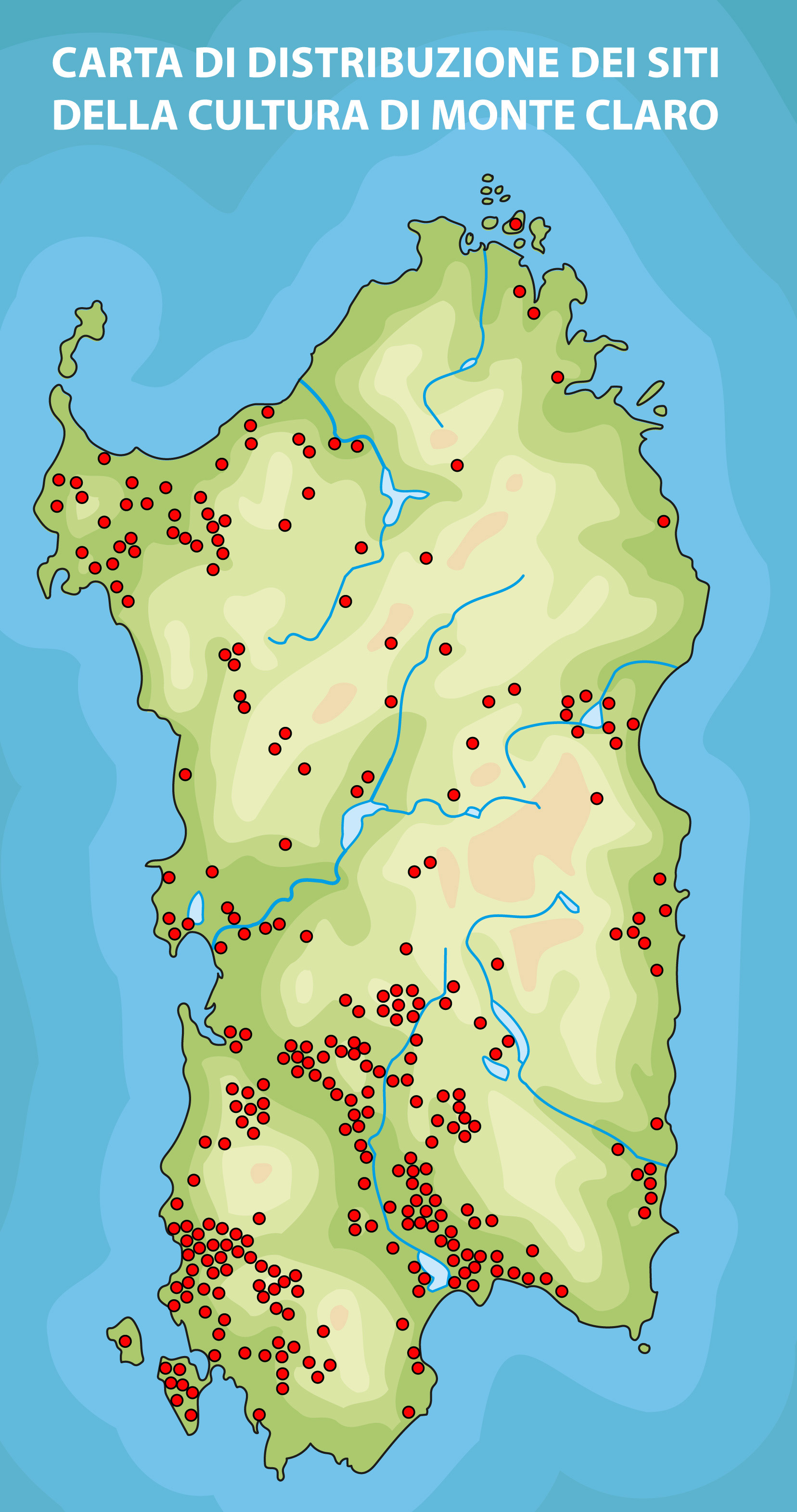
Monte Claro sites in Sardinia

== See also ==
- Pre-Nuragic Sardinia
- Beaker culture in Sardinia
- Chalcolithic Europe
