= Gonnostramatza =

- Comune
- Comune di Gonnostramatza
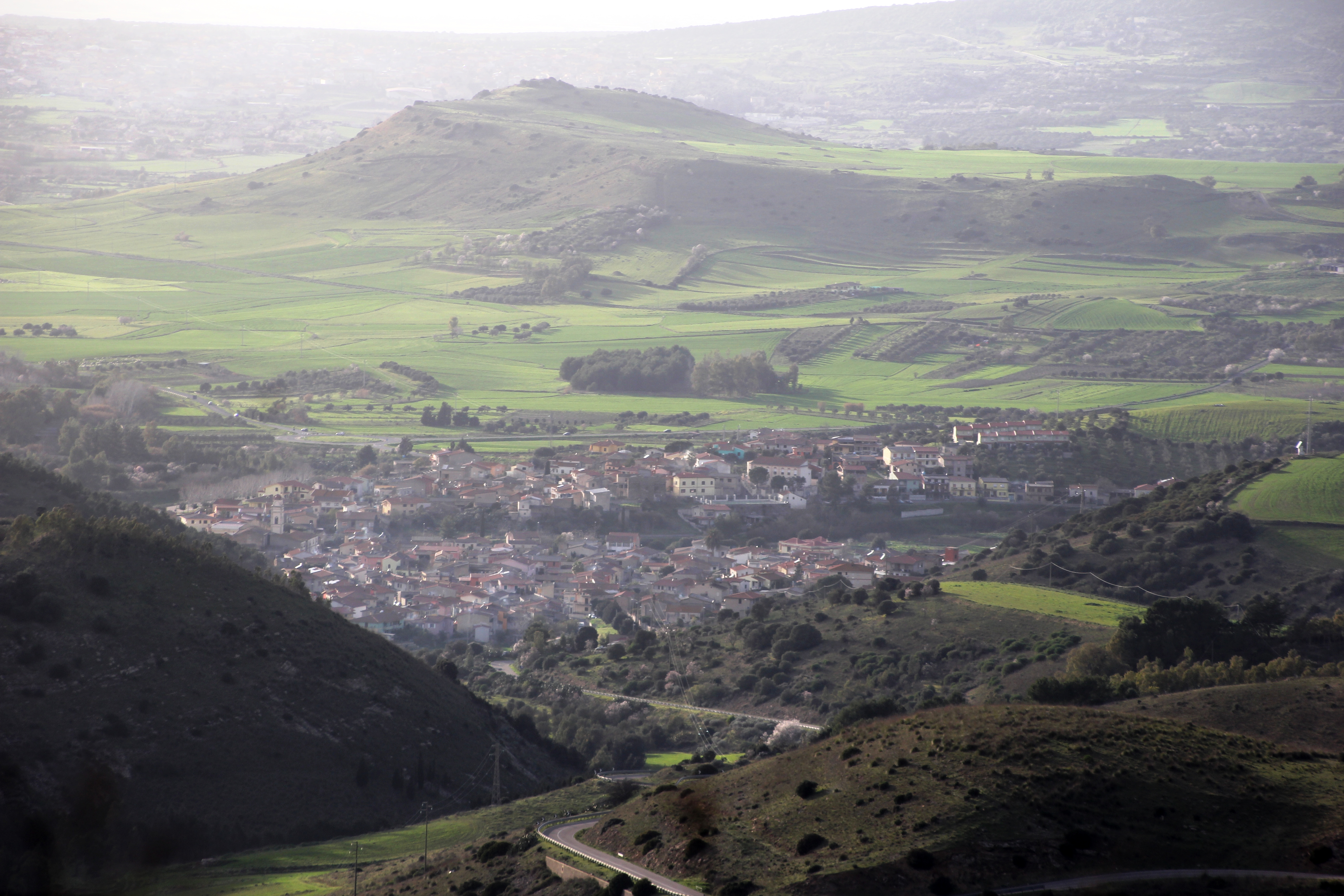

- Coat of arms

- Location within Sardinia
- Coordinates: 39°41′N 8°50′E
- Country: Italy
- Region: Sardinia
- Province: Oristano (OR)

Government
  - Mayor: Maria Agnese Abis

Area
  - Total: 17.64 km^{2} (6.81 sq mi)
- Elevation: 104 m (341 ft)

Population (1 January 2018)
  - Total: 784
  - Density: 44.4/km^{2} (115/sq mi)
- Demonym: Gonnostramatzesi (Sardinian: Tramatzesusu)
- Time zone: UTC+1 (CET)
  - Summer (DST): UTC+2 (CEST)
- Postal code: 09093
- Dialing code: 0783
- Patron saint: St. Michael Archangel
- Saint day: 29 September
- Website: Official website

Gonnostramatza, Gonnos-Tramatza in sardinian language, is a comune (municipality) in the Province of Oristano in the Italian region Sardinia, located about 60 kilometres (37 miles) northwest of Cagliari and about 40 kilometres (25 mi) southeast of Oristano, in the Marmilla.
