= List of municipalities of the Province of Oristano =

This is a list of the 87 municipalities (comuni) of the Province of Oristano in the autonomous region of Sardinia in Italy.

== List ==
Municipality	Native name	Population (2026)	Area (km²)	Density
Abbasanta	Abbasànta	2,539	39.85	63.7
Aidomaggiore	Aidumajòre/Bidumajòre	374	41.21	9.1
Albagiara	Ollàsta	219	8.87	24.7
Ales	Àbas	1,229	22.45	54.7
Allai	Àllai	333	27.36	12.2
Arborea	Arborèa	3,701	94.96	39.0
Ardauli	Ardaùle	738	20.53	35.9
Assolo	Assòlu/Assòu	321	16.37	19.6
Asuni	Asùni	295	21.34	13.8
Baradili	Bobàdri	80	5.57	14.4
Baratili San Pietro	Boàtiri	1,194	6.10	195.7
Baressa	Arèssa	528	12.51	42.2
Bauladu	Baulàu	613	24.22	25.3
Bidonì	Bidunìu	112	11.72	9.6
Bonarcado	Bonàrcadu	1,521	28.41	53.5
Boroneddu	Boronèddu	135	4.59	29.4
Bosa	Bòsa / 'Osa	7,292	128.02	57.0
Busachi	Busàche	1,099	59.03	18.6
Cabras	Cràbas	8,726	102.26	85.3
Cuglieri	Cùllieri	2,411	120.60	20.0
Curcuris	Crucùris	289	7.18	40.3
Flussio	Frussìo	386	6.87	56.2
Fordongianus	Fordongiànis	797	39.48	20.2
Ghilarza	Ilàrtzi	4,038	55.46	72.8
Gonnoscodina	Gonnoscodìna	421	8.82	47.7
Gonnosnò	Gonnonnò	673	15.46	43.5
Gonnostramatza	Gonnostramàtza	777	17.64	44.0
Laconi	Làconi	1,589	124.75	12.7
Magomadas	Magumàdas	594	9.02	65.9
Marrubiu	Marrùbiu	4,499	61.24	73.5
Masullas	Masùddas	979	18.68	52.4
Milis	Mìris	1,394	18.67	74.7
Modolo	Mòdolo	170	2.47	68.8
Mogorella	Mogorèdda	388	17.06	22.7
Mogoro	Mòguru	3,784	48.99	77.2
Montresta	Montrèsta	434	31.16	13.9
Morgongiori	Mragaxòri	597	45.20	13.2
Narbolia	Narabuìa	1,620	40.50	40.0
Neoneli	Neunèle	589	48.01	12.3
Norbello	Norghìddo	1,125	26.18	43.0
Nughedu Santa Vittoria	Nughèdu Santa Itòria	422	28.57	14.8
Nurachi	Nuràchi	1,660	15.97	103.9
Nureci	Nuràci	282	12.87	21.9
Ollastra	Ollàsta	1,067	21.47	49.7
Oristano	Aristànis	29,888	84.57	353.4
Palmas Arborea	Pràmmas	1,494	39.33	38.0
Pau	Pàu	271	13.82	19.6
Paulilatino	Paùlle	2,038	103.85	19.6
Pompu	Pòmpu	217	5.32	40.8
Riola Sardo	Arriòra	1,955	48.11	40.6
Ruinas	Arruìnas	569	30.46	18.7
Sagama	Sàgama	186	11.72	15.9
Samugheo	Samughèo	2,636	81.28	32.4
San Nicolò d'Arcidano	Arcidànu	2,396	28.36	84.5
San Vero Milis	Santu 'èru/Santèru	2,414	72.48	33.3
Santa Giusta	Santa Jùsta	4,558	69.22	65.8
Santu Lussurgiu	Santu Lussùrzu	2,150	99.80	21.5
Scano di Montiferro	Iscànu	1,360	60.47	22.5
Sedilo	Sèdilo	1,919	68.45	28.0
Seneghe	Sèneghe	1,577	57.85	27.3
Senis	Sènis	369	16.06	23.0
Sennariolo	Sinnarìolo	153	15.61	9.8
Siamaggiore	Siamajòri	848	13.17	64.4
Siamanna	Siamànna	735	28.36	25.9
Siapiccia	Siapicìa/Siipicìa	334	17.93	18.6
Simala	Simàba	281	13.38	21.0
Simaxis	Simàghis	2,120	27.82	76.2
Sini	Sìni	520	8.75	59.4
Siris	Sìris	227	6.00	37.8
Soddì	Soddìe	115	5.24	21.9
Solarussa	Sabarùssa	2,191	31.86	68.8
Sorradile	Sorradìle	333	26.34	12.6
Suni	Sùne	968	47.46	20.4
Tadasuni	Tadasùne	125	5.09	24.6
Terralba	Terràba	9,550	49.80	191.8
Tinnura	Tinnùra	242	3.85	62.9
Tramatza	Tramàtza	887	16.80	52.8
Tresnuraghes	Tresnuràghes	1,037	31.58	32.8
Ula Tirso	Ula	447	18.85	23.7
Uras	Ùras	2,598	39.24	66.2
Usellus	Usèddus	664	35.07	18.9
Villa Sant'Antonio	Sant'Antòni	313	19.05	16.4
Villa Verde	Bàini	258	17.65	14.6
Villanova Truschedu	Biddanòa Truschèdu	283	16.61	17.0
Villaurbana	Biddobràna	1,439	58.70	24.5
Zeddiani	Tzeddiàni	1,107	11.81	93.7
Zerfaliu	Tzorfolìu	979	15.56	62.9

== See also ==
- List of municipalities of Sardinia
- List of municipalities of Italy
