= List of municipalities of Sardinia =

Location of Sardinia within Italy

The following is a list of the municipalities (comuni) of the autonomous island region of Sardinia in Italy.

There are 377 municipalities in Sardinia as of 2026:

- 70 in the Metropolitan City of Cagliari
- 26 in the Province of Gallura North-East Sardinia
- 28 in the Province of Medio Campidano
- 53 in the Province of Nuoro
- 23 in the Province of Ogliastra
- 87 in the Province of Oristano
- 66 in the Metropolitan City of Sassari
- 24 in the Province of Sulcis Iglesiente

== List ==
Municipality	Native name	Province	Population (2026)	Area (km^{2})	Density
Abbasanta	Abbasànta	Oristano	2,539	39.85	63.7
Aggius	Àgghju	Gallura North-East Sardinia	1,378	86.31	16.0
Aglientu	Santu Francìscu di l'Aglièntu	Gallura North-East Sardinia	1,195	148.19	8.1
Aidomaggiore	Aidumajòre/Bidumajòre	Oristano	374	41.21	9.1
Alà dei Sardi	Alà	Gallura North-East Sardinia	1,745	197.99	8.8
Albagiara	Ollàsta	Oristano	219	8.87	24.7
Ales	Àbas	Oristano	1,229	22.45	54.7
Alghero	L'Alguer, S'Alighera	Sassari	41,765	225.40	185.3
Allai	Àllai	Oristano	333	27.36	12.2
Anela	Anèla	Sassari	553	36.89	15.0
Arborea	Arborèa	Oristano	3,701	94.96	39.0
Arbus	Àrbus	Medio Campidano	5,532	269.12	20.6
Ardara	Àldara	Sassari	680	38.19	17.8
Ardauli	Ardaùle	Oristano	738	20.53	35.9
Aritzo	Arìtzo	Nuoro	1,272	75.58	16.8
Armungia	Armùngia/Armùnja	Cagliari	395	54.75	7.2
Arzachena	Alzachèna, Altzaghèna	Gallura North-East Sardinia	13,456	230.85	58.3
Arzana	Àrthana	Ogliastra	2,199	162.49	13.5
Assemini	Assèmini	Cagliari	25,575	118.17	216.4
Assolo	Assòlu/Assòu	Oristano	321	16.37	19.6
Asuni	Asùni	Oristano	295	21.34	13.8
Atzara	Atzàra	Nuoro	974	35.92	27.1
Austis	Aùstis	Nuoro	711	50.81	14.0
Badesi	Badèsi	Gallura North-East Sardinia	1,812	31.30	57.9
Ballao	Ballàu	Cagliari	706	46.63	15.1
Banari	Bànari	Sassari	508	21.25	23.9
Baradili	Bobàdri	Oristano	80	5.57	14.4
Baratili San Pietro	Boàtiri	Oristano	1,194	6.10	195.7
Baressa	Arèssa	Oristano	528	12.51	42.2
Bari Sardo	Barì	Ogliastra	3,770	37.43	100.7
Barrali	Barràbi	Cagliari	1,087	11.23	96.8
Barumini	Barùmini	Medio Campidano	1,084	26.40	41.1
Bauladu	Baulàu	Oristano	613	24.22	25.3
Baunei	Baunèi	Ogliastra	3,366	211.90	15.9
Belvì	Brebì	Nuoro	529	18.10	29.2
Benetutti	Benetùti	Sassari	1,623	94.45	17.2
Berchidda	Belchìdda, Bilchìdda	Gallura North-East Sardinia	2,604	201.88	12.9
Bessude	Bessùde	Sassari	369	26.79	13.8
Bidonì	Bidunìu	Oristano	112	11.72	9.6
Birori	Bìroro	Nuoro	481	17.33	27.8
Bitti	Bìtzi	Nuoro	2,476	215.37	11.5
Bolotana	Olòthene/Bolòtzana	Nuoro	2,244	108.44	20.7
Bonarcado	Bonàrcadu	Oristano	1,521	28.41	53.5
Bonnanaro	Bunnànnaru	Sassari	894	21.84	40.9
Bono	Bòno	Sassari	3,232	74.54	43.4
Bonorva	Bonòlva	Sassari	3,030	149.75	20.2
Boroneddu	Boronèddu	Oristano	135	4.59	29.4
Borore	Bòrere	Nuoro	1,902	42.68	44.6
Bortigali	Bortigàle	Nuoro	1,218	67.33	18.1
Bortigiadas	Bultigghjàta	Gallura North-East Sardinia	692	75.90	9.1
Borutta	Borùta	Sassari	244	4.76	51.3
Bosa	Bòsa / 'Osa	Oristano	7,292	128.02	57.0
Bottidda	Bòtidda	Sassari	627	33.71	18.6
Buddusò	Buddusò	Gallura North-East Sardinia	3,487	176.84	19.7
Budoni	Budùne, Budùni	Gallura North-East Sardinia	5,685	54.28	104.7
Buggerru	Bugèrru	Sulcis Iglesiente	1,007	48.33	20.8
Bultei	Urtèi	Sassari	776	96.83	8.0
Bulzi	Bùltzi	Sassari	507	21.67	23.4
Burcei	Brucèi	Cagliari	2,571	94.85	27.1
Burgos	Su Bùrgu	Sassari	817	18.08	45.2
Busachi	Busàche	Oristano	1,099	59.03	18.6
Cabras	Cràbas	Oristano	8,726	102.26	85.3
Cagliari	Castèddu	Cagliari	145,981	85.01	1,717.2
Calangianus	Caragnàni, Calanzànos	Gallura North-East Sardinia	3,692	126.84	29.1
Calasetta	Câdesédda, Cal 'e Sèda	Sulcis Iglesiente	2,776	31.06	89.4
Capoterra	Cabudèrra	Cagliari	23,015	68.49	336.0
Carbonia	Carbònia/Crabònia	Sulcis Iglesiente	25,353	145.54	174.2
Cardedu	Cardèdu	Ogliastra	2,002	33.39	60.0
Cargeghe	Calzèghe, Cagliègga	Sassari	590	12.05	49.0
Carloforte	U Pàize, Carlufòrti	Sulcis Iglesiente	5,851	51.10	114.5
Castelsardo	Calthèddu, Castèddu Sardu	Sassari	5,624	43.34	129.8
Castiadas	Castiàdas	Cagliari	1,740	103.89	16.7
Cheremule	Cherèmule	Sassari	378	24.25	15.6
Chiaramonti	Tzaramònte, Ciaramònti, Chjaramònti	Sassari	1,494	98.61	15.2
Codrongianos	Codronzànu/Codronzànos	Sassari	1,252	30.39	41.2
Collinas	Fòrru	Medio Campidano	741	20.83	35.6
Cossoine	Cossoìne	Sassari	739	39.17	18.9
Cuglieri	Cùllieri	Oristano	2,411	120.60	20.0
Curcuris	Crucùris	Oristano	289	7.18	40.3
Decimomannu	Deximumànnu	Cagliari	8,375	27.72	302.1
Decimoputzu	Deximupùtzu	Cagliari	4,165	44.77	93.0
Desulo	Dèsulu	Nuoro	1,995	74.50	26.8
Dolianova	Patiòlla	Cagliari	9,357	84.31	111.0
Domus de Maria	Dòmus de Marìa	Cagliari	1,630	97.14	16.8
Domusnovas	Domusnòas	Sulcis Iglesiente	5,694	80.59	70.7
Donori	Donòri	Cagliari	1,912	35.31	54.1
Dorgali	Durgàli	Nuoro	8,238	226.54	36.4
Dualchi	Duàrche	Nuoro	559	23.41	23.9
Elini	Elìni	Ogliastra	555	10.65	52.1
Elmas	Su Màsu	Cagliari	9,480	13.63	695.5
Erula	Èrula	Sassari	702	39.31	17.9
Escalaplano	Scaleprànu	Cagliari	2,017	94.04	21.4
Escolca	Iscròca	Cagliari	531	14.76	36.0
Esporlatu	Isporlàtu	Sassari	360	18.40	19.6
Esterzili	Istersìli/Stersìli	Cagliari	536	100.74	5.3
Florinas	Fiolìnas	Sassari	1,459	36.06	40.5
Fluminimaggiore	Frùmini Majòri	Sulcis Iglesiente	2,575	108.18	23.8
Flussio	Frussìo	Oristano	386	6.87	56.2
Fonni	Onne	Nuoro	3,552	112.27	31.6
Fordongianus	Fordongiànis	Oristano	797	39.48	20.2
Furtei	Futèi	Medio Campidano	1,474	26.11	56.5
Gadoni	Adòni	Nuoro	638	43.44	14.7
Gairo	Gàiru	Ogliastra	1,272	77.49	16.4
Galtellì	Gartèddi	Nuoro	2,377	56.53	42.0
Gavoi	Gavòi	Nuoro	2,404	38.06	63.2
Genoni	Jaròi/Geròni	Cagliari	716	43.79	16.4
Genuri	Giaùni/Jaùni	Medio Campidano	295	7.52	39.2
Gergei	Gerxèi	Cagliari	1,095	36.18	30.3
Gesico	Gèsigu	Cagliari	698	25.62	27.2
Gesturi	Gèsturi	Medio Campidano	1,113	46.83	23.8
Ghilarza	Ilàrtzi	Oristano	4,038	55.46	72.8
Giave	Tzàve	Sassari	471	47.07	10.0
Giba	Gìba	Sulcis Iglesiente	1,861	30.44	61.1
Girasole	Gelisùli	Ogliastra	1,369	13.16	104.0
Golfo Aranci	Fìgari	Gallura North-East Sardinia	2,373	37.43	63.4
Goni	Gòni	Cagliari	434	18.60	23.3
Gonnesa	Gonnèsa	Sulcis Iglesiente	4,456	48.06	92.7
Gonnoscodina	Gonnoscodìna	Oristano	421	8.82	47.7
Gonnosfanadiga	Gònnos	Medio Campidano	5,959	125.19	47.6
Gonnosnò	Gonnonnò	Oristano	673	15.46	43.5
Gonnostramatza	Gonnostramàtza	Oristano	777	17.64	44.0
Guamaggiore	Gomajòri	Cagliari	872	16.80	51.9
Guasila	Guasìba/Guasìlla	Cagliari	2,411	43.51	55.4
Guspini	Gùspini	Medio Campidano	10,563	174.67	60.5
Iglesias	Igrèsias/Bidd'e Crèsia	Sulcis Iglesiente	24,409	208.23	117.2
Ilbono	Irbòno	Ogliastra	1,966	31.13	63.2
Illorai	Illorài	Sassari	698	57.19	12.2
Irgoli	Irgòli	Nuoro	2,194	75.30	29.1
Isili	Ìsili	Cagliari	2,429	67.84	35.8
Ittireddu	Itirèddu	Sassari	457	23.69	19.3
Ittiri	Ìtiri Cannèdu	Sassari	7,730	111.46	69.4
Jerzu	Jèrsu	Ogliastra	2,912	102.41	28.4
La Maddalena	A Madalèna, Sa Madalèna	Gallura North-East Sardinia	10,449	52.01	200.9
Laconi	Làconi	Oristano	1,589	124.75	12.7
Laerru	Laèrru	Sassari	806	19.85	40.6
Lanusei	Lanusè	Ogliastra	4,881	53.17	91.8
Las Plassas	Is Pràtzas	Medio Campidano	208	11.04	18.8
Lei	Lèi	Nuoro	433	19.11	22.7
Loceri	Lòceri	Ogliastra	1,345	19.37	69.4
Loculi	Lòcula	Nuoro	476	38.15	12.5
Lodè	Lodè	Nuoro	1,455	123.45	11.8
Lodine	Lodìne	Nuoro	292	7.70	37.9
Loiri Porto San Paolo	Lòiri Poltu Santu Pàulu	Gallura North-East Sardinia	3,929	118.52	33.2
Lotzorai	Lotzorài	Ogliastra	2,122	16.87	125.8
Lula	Lùvula	Nuoro	1,198	148.72	8.1
Lunamatrona	Lunamatròna	Medio Campidano	1,582	20.59	76.8
Luogosanto	Locusàntu, Logusàntu	Gallura North-East Sardinia	1,838	135.07	13.6
Luras	Lùras, Lùrisi	Gallura North-East Sardinia	2,369	87.59	27.0
Macomer	Macumère	Nuoro	8,948	122.77	72.9
Magomadas	Magumàdas	Oristano	594	9.02	65.9
Mamoiada	Mamujàda	Nuoro	2,349	48.83	48.1
Mandas	Màndas	Cagliari	1,938	45.02	43.0
Mara	Màra	Sassari	518	18.64	27.8
Maracalagonis	Màra	Cagliari	7,885	101.37	77.8
Marrubiu	Marrùbiu	Oristano	4,499	61.24	73.5
Martis	Màltis, Màlti	Sassari	455	22.96	19.8
Masainas	Masàinas	Sulcis Iglesiente	1,203	23.69	50.8
Masullas	Masùddas	Oristano	979	18.68	52.4
Meana Sardo	Meàna	Nuoro	1,518	73.80	20.6
Milis	Mìris	Oristano	1,394	18.67	74.7
Modolo	Mòdolo	Oristano	170	2.47	68.8
Mogorella	Mogorèdda	Oristano	388	17.06	22.7
Mogoro	Mòguru	Oristano	3,784	48.99	77.2
Monastir	Muristèni	Cagliari	4,884	31.79	153.6
Monserrato	Paùli	Cagliari	18,624	6.43	2,896.4
Monteleone Rocca Doria	Monteleòne	Sassari	105	13.39	7.8
Monti	Mònte	Gallura North-East Sardinia	2,406	123.82	19.4
Montresta	Montrèsta	Oristano	434	31.16	13.9
Mores	Mòres	Sassari	1,663	94.86	17.5
Morgongiori	Mragaxòri	Oristano	597	45.20	13.2
Muravera	Murèra	Cagliari	4,973	93.51	53.2
Muros	Mùros	Sassari	822	11.23	73.2
Musei	Mùsei	Sulcis Iglesiente	1,512	20.27	74.6
Narbolia	Narabuìa	Oristano	1,620	40.50	40.0
Narcao	Narcàu	Sulcis Iglesiente	2,967	85.88	34.5
Neoneli	Neunèle	Oristano	589	48.01	12.3
Noragugume	Noragùgume	Nuoro	269	26.73	10.1
Norbello	Norghìddo	Oristano	1,125	26.18	43.0
Nughedu San Nicolò	Nughèdu	Sassari	710	67.89	10.5
Nughedu Santa Vittoria	Nughèdu Santa Itòria	Oristano	422	28.57	14.8
Nule	Nule	Sassari	1,259	51.95	24.2
Nulvi	Nùjvi	Sassari	2,572	67.38	38.2
Nuoro	Nùgoro	Nuoro	32,718	192.06	170.4
Nurachi	Nuràchi	Oristano	1,660	15.97	103.9
Nuragus	Nuràgus	Cagliari	795	19.90	39.9
Nurallao	Nuràdda	Cagliari	1,089	34.76	31.3
Nuraminis	Nuràminis	Cagliari	2,337	45.18	51.7
Nureci	Nuràci	Oristano	282	12.87	21.9
Nurri	Nurri	Cagliari	1,988	73.67	27.0
Nuxis	Nùxis/Nùcis	Sulcis Iglesiente	1,382	61.59	22.4
Olbia	Terranòa, Tarranòa	Gallura North-East Sardinia	61,739	383.64	160.9
Oliena	Ulìana	Nuoro	6,405	165.74	38.6
Ollastra	Ollàsta	Oristano	1,067	21.47	49.7
Ollolai	Ollolài	Nuoro	1,129	27.24	41.4
Olmedo	S'Ulumèdu	Sassari	4,240	33.47	126.7
Olzai	Ortzài/Orthài	Nuoro	752	69.82	10.8
Onanì	Onanìe	Nuoro	337	71.97	4.7
Onifai	Oniài	Nuoro	728	43.19	16.9
Oniferi	Onièri	Nuoro	823	35.67	23.1
Orani	Oràne	Nuoro	2,576	130.43	19.8
Orgosolo	Orgòsolo	Nuoro	3,803	222.60	17.1
Oristano	Aristànis	Oristano	29,888	84.57	353.4
Orosei	Orosèi	Nuoro	6,838	91.00	75.1
Orotelli	Orotèddi	Nuoro	1,824	61.18	29.8
Orroli	Arròlli/Arròli	Cagliari	1,909	75.59	25.3
Ortacesus	Ortacèsus	Cagliari	859	23.63	36.4
Ortueri	Ortuèri	Nuoro	961	38.83	24.7
Orune	Urùne/Orùne	Nuoro	2,022	128.45	15.7
Oschiri	Óschiri, Óscari	Gallura North-East Sardinia	2,885	215.61	13.4
Osidda	Osìdde	Nuoro	209	25.68	8.1
Osilo	Ósile, Ósili, Ósilu	Sassari	2,732	98.03	27.9
Osini	Osìni	Ogliastra	681	39.81	17.1
Ossi	Ossi	Sassari	5,344	30.09	177.6
Ottana	Otzàna	Nuoro	2,147	45.07	47.6
Ovodda	Ovòdda	Nuoro	1,429	40.85	35.0
Ozieri	Otièri	Sassari	9,559	252.13	37.9
Pabillonis	Pabillòis	Medio Campidano	2,404	37.42	64.2
Padria	Pàdria	Sassari	574	48.39	11.9
Padru	Pàdru, Pàtru	Gallura North-East Sardinia	2,130	158.00	13.5
Palau	Lu Palàu	Gallura North-East Sardinia	4,058	44.44	91.3
Palmas Arborea	Pràmmas	Oristano	1,494	39.33	38.0
Pattada	Patàda	Sassari	2,763	164.88	16.8
Pau	Pàu	Oristano	271	13.82	19.6
Pauli Arbarei	Paùli Arbarèi	Medio Campidano	524	15.14	34.6
Paulilatino	Paùlle	Oristano	2,038	103.85	19.6
Perdasdefogu	Foghèsu	Ogliastra	1,689	77.75	21.7
Perdaxius	Perdàxius	Sulcis Iglesiente	1,276	29.50	43.3
Perfugas	Pèifugas, Pèlfica	Sassari	2,212	60.88	36.3
Pimentel	Pramantèllu	Cagliari	1,078	14.97	72.0
Piscinas	Piscìnas	Sulcis Iglesiente	758	16.89	44.9
Ploaghe	Piàghe	Sassari	4,201	96.27	43.6
Pompu	Pòmpu	Oristano	217	5.32	40.8
Porto Torres	Posthudòrra, Portu Tùrre, Poltu Tùrri	Sassari	20,624	104.41	197.5
Portoscuso	Portescùsi	Sulcis Iglesiente	4,689	38.09	123.1
Posada	Pasàda	Nuoro	3,079	32.77	94.0
Pozzomaggiore	Pottumajòre/Pottumaggiòre	Sassari	2,286	78.77	29.0
Pula	Pùla	Cagliari	7,048	138.92	50.7
Putifigari	Potuvìgari	Sassari	658	53.10	12.4
Quartu Sant'Elena	Cuàrtu Sant'Alèni	Cagliari	67,869	96.41	704.0
Quartucciu	Cuattùcciu	Cagliari	12,723	27.93	455.5
Riola Sardo	Arriòra	Oristano	1,955	48.11	40.6
Romana	Rumàna	Sassari	457	21.60	21.2
Ruinas	Arruìnas	Oristano	569	30.46	18.7
Sadali	Sàdili	Cagliari	772	49.61	15.6
Sagama	Sàgama	Oristano	186	11.72	15.9
Samassi	Samàssi	Medio Campidano	4,674	42.04	111.2
Samatzai	Samatzài	Cagliari	1,502	31.16	48.2
Samugheo	Samughèo	Oristano	2,636	81.28	32.4
San Basilio	Santu 'Asìli 'e mònti	Cagliari	1,067	44.63	23.9
San Gavino Monreale	Santu 'Èngiu	Medio Campidano	7,823	87.40	89.5
San Giovanni Suergiu	Santu Giuànni Suèrgiu/Santu Juanni Sruèxu	Sulcis Iglesiente	5,523	72.37	76.3
San Nicolò d'Arcidano	Arcidànu	Oristano	2,396	28.36	84.5
San Nicolò Gerrei	Paùli Gerrèi/Pàùli Xrexèi	Cagliari	709	63.52	11.2
San Sperate	Santu Sparàu	Cagliari	8,625	26.24	328.7
San Teodoro	Santu Diadòru, Santu Tiadòru	Gallura North-East Sardinia	5,224	107.60	48.6
San Vero Milis	Santu 'èru/Santèru	Oristano	2,414	72.48	33.3
San Vito	Santu Ìdu	Cagliari	3,409	231.64	14.7
Sanluri	Seddòri	Medio Campidano	7,996	84.23	94.9
Sant'Andrea Frius	Sant'Andrìa 'e Frìus	Cagliari	1,659	36.16	45.9
Sant'Anna Arresi	Arrèsi	Sulcis Iglesiente	2,626	36.68	71.6
Sant'Antioco	Santu Antiògu	Sulcis Iglesiente	10,404	87.90	118.4
Sant'Antonio di Gallura	Sant'Antòni de Calanzànos	Gallura North-East Sardinia	1,432	81.69	17.5
Santa Giusta	Santa Jùsta	Oristano	4,558	69.22	65.8
Santa Maria Coghinas	Cuzìna	Sassari	1,346	22.97	58.6
Santa Teresa Gallura	Lungòni, Lungòne	Gallura North-East Sardinia	5,144	102.29	50.3
Santadi	Santàdi	Sulcis Iglesiente	3,029	116.49	26.0
Santu Lussurgiu	Santu Lussùrzu	Oristano	2,150	99.80	21.5
Sardara	Sàrdara	Medio Campidano	3,711	56.23	66.0
Sarroch	Sarròccu	Cagliari	4,980	67.83	73.4
Sarule	Sarùle	Nuoro	1,450	52.72	27.5
Sassari	Tàtari, Sàssari	Sassari	120,231	547.04	219.8
Scano di Montiferro	Iscànu	Oristano	1,360	60.47	22.5
Sedilo	Sèdilo	Oristano	1,919	68.45	28.0
Sedini	Sèddini	Sassari	1,183	40.51	29.2
Segariu	Segarìu	Medio Campidano	1,074	16.69	64.3
Selargius	Ceràxius	Cagliari	28,272	26.67	1,060.1
Selegas	Sèligas	Cagliari	1,253	20.39	61.5
Semestene	Semèstene	Sassari	127	39.58	3.2
Seneghe	Sèneghe	Oristano	1,577	57.85	27.3
Senis	Sènis	Oristano	369	16.06	23.0
Sennariolo	Sinnarìolo	Oristano	153	15.61	9.8
Sennori	Sènnaru, Sènnari	Sassari	6,657	31.34	212.4
Senorbì	Senorbì	Cagliari	4,810	34.29	140.3
Serdiana	Serdìana	Cagliari	2,643	55.71	47.4
Serramanna	Serramànna	Medio Campidano	8,388	83.84	100.0
Serrenti	Serrènti	Medio Campidano	4,425	42.78	103.4
Serri	Sèrri	Cagliari	588	19.18	30.7
Sestu	Sèstu	Cagliari	20,630	48.29	427.2
Settimo San Pietro	Sètimu	Cagliari	6,968	23.29	299.2
Setzu	Sètzu	Medio Campidano	127	7.77	16.3
Seui	Seùi	Ogliastra	1,137	148.21	7.7
Seulo	Seùlu	Nuoro	745	58.79	12.7
Siamaggiore	Siamajòri	Oristano	848	13.17	64.4
Siamanna	Siamànna	Oristano	735	28.36	25.9
Siapiccia	Siapicìa/Siipicìa	Oristano	334	17.93	18.6
Siddi	Sìddi	Medio Campidano	541	11.02	49.1
Silanus	Silànos	Nuoro	1,891	47.94	39.4
Siligo	Sìligo	Sassari	734	43.45	16.9
Siliqua	Silìcua	Cagliari	3,468	189.85	18.3
Silius	Silìus	Cagliari	987	38.36	25.7
Simala	Simàba	Oristano	281	13.38	21.0
Simaxis	Simàghis	Oristano	2,120	27.82	76.2
Sindia	Sindìa	Nuoro	1,558	58.57	26.6
Sini	Sìni	Oristano	520	8.75	59.4
Siniscola	Thiniscòle	Nuoro	11,139	196.38	56.7
Sinnai	Sìnnia	Cagliari	17,447	223.91	77.9
Siris	Sìris	Oristano	227	6.00	37.8
Siurgus Donigala	Seùrgus Donigàla/Sriùgus Donigàlla	Cagliari	1,820	76.39	23.8
Soddì	Soddìe	Oristano	115	5.24	21.9
Solarussa	Sabarùssa	Oristano	2,191	31.86	68.8
Soleminis	Solèminis	Cagliari	1,902	12.79	148.7
Sorgono	Sòrgono	Nuoro	1,434	56.05	25.6
Sorradile	Sorradìle	Oristano	333	26.34	12.6
Sorso	Sòssu	Sassari	14,394	67.01	214.8
Stintino	Isthintìni, Istintìnu	Sassari	1,567	59.04	26.5
Suelli	Suèddi	Cagliari	1,049	19.20	54.6
Suni	Sùne	Oristano	968	47.46	20.4
Tadasuni	Tadasùne	Oristano	125	5.09	24.6
Talana	Talàna	Ogliastra	913	118.68	7.7
Telti	Tèlti	Gallura North-East Sardinia	2,281	83.25	27.4
Tempio Pausania	Tèmpiu	Gallura North-East Sardinia	12,878	210.82	61.1
Tergu	Zèlgu	Sassari	612	36.88	16.6
Terralba	Terràba	Oristano	9,550	49.80	191.8
Tertenia	Tertenìa	Ogliastra	3,834	117.65	32.6
Teti	Tèti	Nuoro	561	43.80	12.8
Teulada	Teulàda	Sulcis Iglesiente	3,156	246.19	12.8
Thiesi	Tièsi	Sassari	2,635	63.25	41.7
Tiana	Tìana	Nuoro	418	19.32	21.6
Tinnura	Tinnùra	Oristano	242	3.85	62.9
Tissi	Tissi	Sassari	2,352	10.24	229.7
Tonara	Tonàra	Nuoro	1,806	52.02	34.7
Torpè	Torpè	Nuoro	2,757	91.50	30.1
Torralba	Turàlva	Sassari	854	36.50	23.4
Tortolì	Tortolì	Ogliastra	10,994	40.29	272.9
Tramatza	Tramàtza	Oristano	887	16.80	52.8
Tratalias	Tratalìas	Sulcis Iglesiente	988	31.00	31.9
Tresnuraghes	Tresnuràghes	Oristano	1,037	31.58	32.8
Triei	Trièi	Ogliastra	1,060	32.98	32.1
Trinità d'Agultu e Vignola	La Trinitài e Vignòla	Gallura North-East Sardinia	2,579	134.00	19.2
Tuili	Tuìli	Medio Campidano	882	24.59	35.9
Tula	Tùla	Sassari	1,425	66.19	21.5
Turri	Tùrri	Medio Campidano	375	9.60	39.1
Ula Tirso	Ula	Oristano	447	18.85	23.7
Ulassai	Ulàssa	Ogliastra	1,365	122.41	11.2
Uras	Ùras	Oristano	2,598	39.24	66.2
Uri	Uri	Sassari	2,822	56.81	49.7
Urzulei	Orthullè	Ogliastra	1,024	129.64	7.9
Usellus	Usèddus	Oristano	664	35.07	18.9
Usini	Ùsini	Sassari	4,120	30.74	134.0
Ussana	Ùssana	Cagliari	3,997	32.82	121.8
Ussaramanna	Soramànna	Medio Campidano	466	9.76	47.7
Ussassai	Ussàssa	Ogliastra	432	47.32	9.1
Uta	Uda	Cagliari	8,899	134.71	66.1
Valledoria	Codaruìna	Sassari	4,321	25.95	166.5
Vallermosa	Biddaramòsa	Cagliari	1,782	61.75	28.9
Viddalba	Vidda 'ècchja	Sassari	1,570	50.41	31.1
Villa San Pietro	Santu Pèdru	Cagliari	2,095	39.89	52.5
Villa Sant'Antonio	Sant'Antòni	Oristano	313	19.05	16.4
Villa Verde	Bàini	Oristano	258	17.65	14.6
Villacidro	Bidda de Cidru/Biddexìdru	Medio Campidano	12,878	183.48	70.2
Villagrande Strisaili	Biddamànna Strisàili	Ogliastra	2,834	210.35	13.5
Villamar	Mara Arbarèi	Medio Campidano	2,392	38.53	62.1
Villamassargia	Bidda Matzràxia	Sulcis Iglesiente	3,278	91.39	35.9
Villanova Monteleone	Biddanòa Monteleòne	Sassari	2,039	202.68	10.1
Villanova Truschedu	Biddanòa Truschèdu	Oristano	283	16.61	17.0
Villanova Tulo	Biddanòa 'e Tùlu	Cagliari	977	40.45	24.2
Villanovaforru	Biddanòa de Fòrru	Medio Campidano	789	10.93	72.2
Villanovafranca	Biddanòa Frànca	Medio Campidano	1,135	27.59	41.1
Villaperuccio	Sa Baronìa	Sulcis Iglesiente	1,007	36.43	27.6
Villaputzu	Biddepùtzi	Cagliari	4,364	181.31	24.1
Villasalto	Biddesàtu	Cagliari	876	130.36	6.7
Villasimius	Crabonàxa	Cagliari	3,762	57.97	64.9
Villasor	Bidd'e Sòrris	Cagliari	6,480	86.79	74.7
Villaspeciosa	Biddaspitziòsa	Cagliari	2,700	27.19	99.3
Villaurbana	Biddobràna	Oristano	1,439	58.70	24.5
Zeddiani	Tzeddiàni	Oristano	1,107	11.81	93.7
Zerfaliu	Tzorfolìu	Oristano	979	15.56	62.9

== See also ==
- List of municipalities of Italy
