= Ala, Trentino =

Ala
- Comune
- Comune di Ala
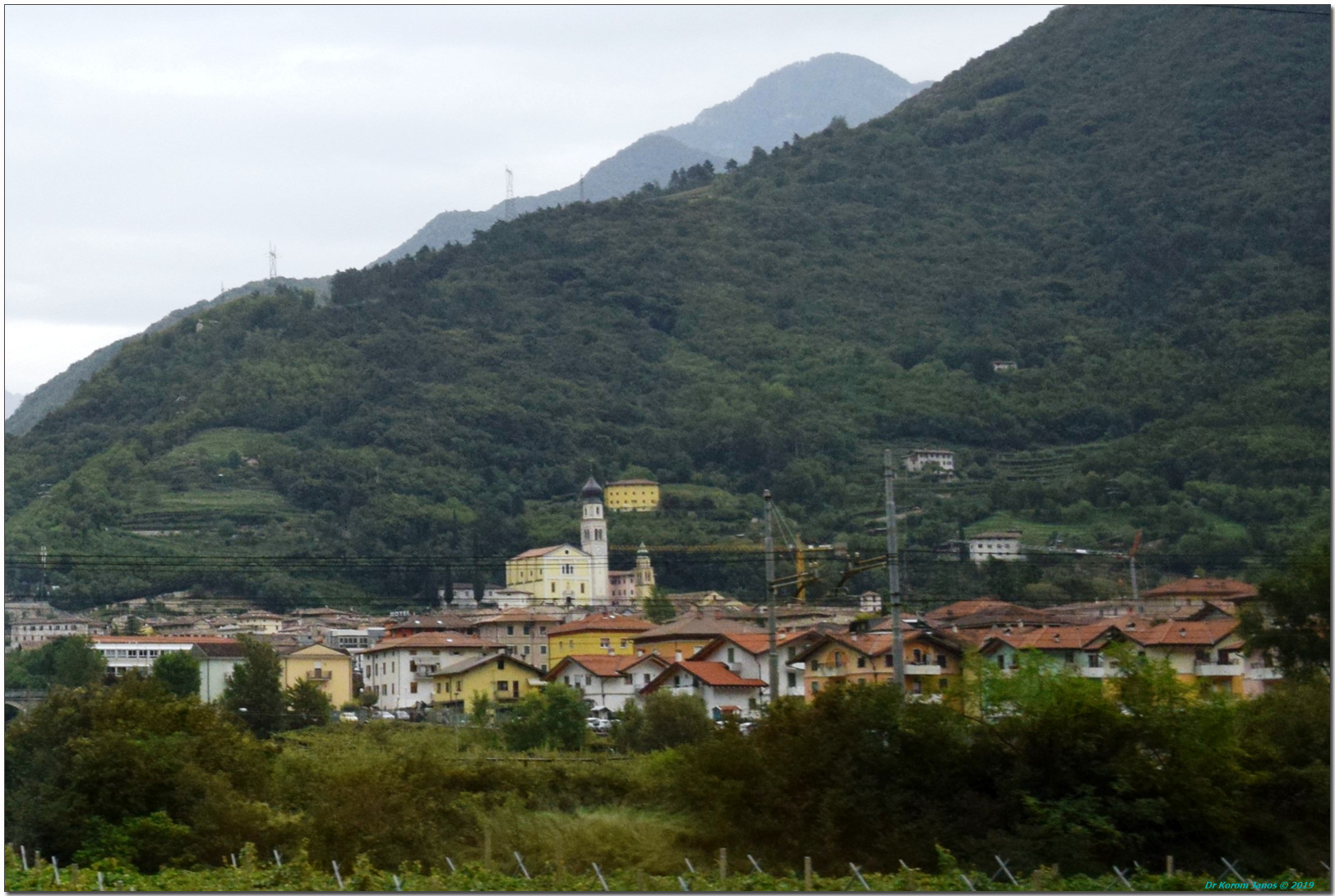

- Flag Coat of arms

- Location of Ala in Italy Ala (Trentino-Alto Adige/Südtirol)
- Coordinates: 45°45′30″N 11°0′20″E
- Country: Italy
- Region: Trentino-Alto Adige/Südtirol
- Province: Trentino (TN)
- Frazioni: Chizzola, Marani, Pilcante, Rifugio Fraccaroli, Rifugio Scalorbi, Ronchi, Santa Margherita, Sega, Serravalle

Government
  - Mayor: Stefano Gatti

Area
  - Total: 119 km^{2} (46 sq mi)
- Elevation: 210 m (690 ft)

Population (2026)
  - Total: 8,898
  - Density: 74.8/km^{2} (194/sq mi)
- Demonym: Alensi
- Time zone: UTC+1 (CET)
  - Summer (DST): UTC+2 (CEST)
- Postal code: 38061
- Dialing code: 0464
- ISTAT code: 022001
- Patron saint: Saint Mary Assumpted
- Saint day: August 15
- Website: Official website

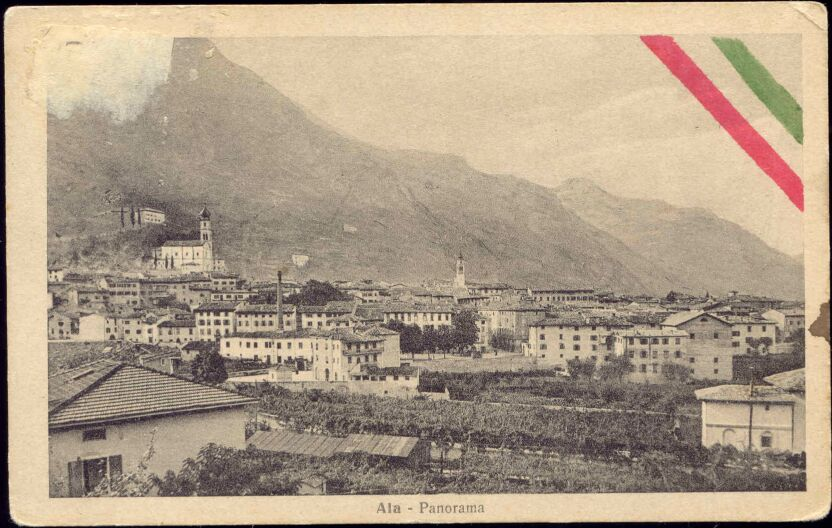
Ala in the year 1910

Ala is a comune in Trentino, north-eastern Italy. Until the First World War, it was an important border town between the Kingdom of Italy and the Austro Hungarian Empire.

It was the birthplace in 1896 of the supercentenarian Venere Pizzinato who lived to be 114. Alongside Ateleta, Onano, Orero and Siris, it is one of five Italian municipalities with a palindromic name.
