= Onano =

- Comune
- Comune di Onano
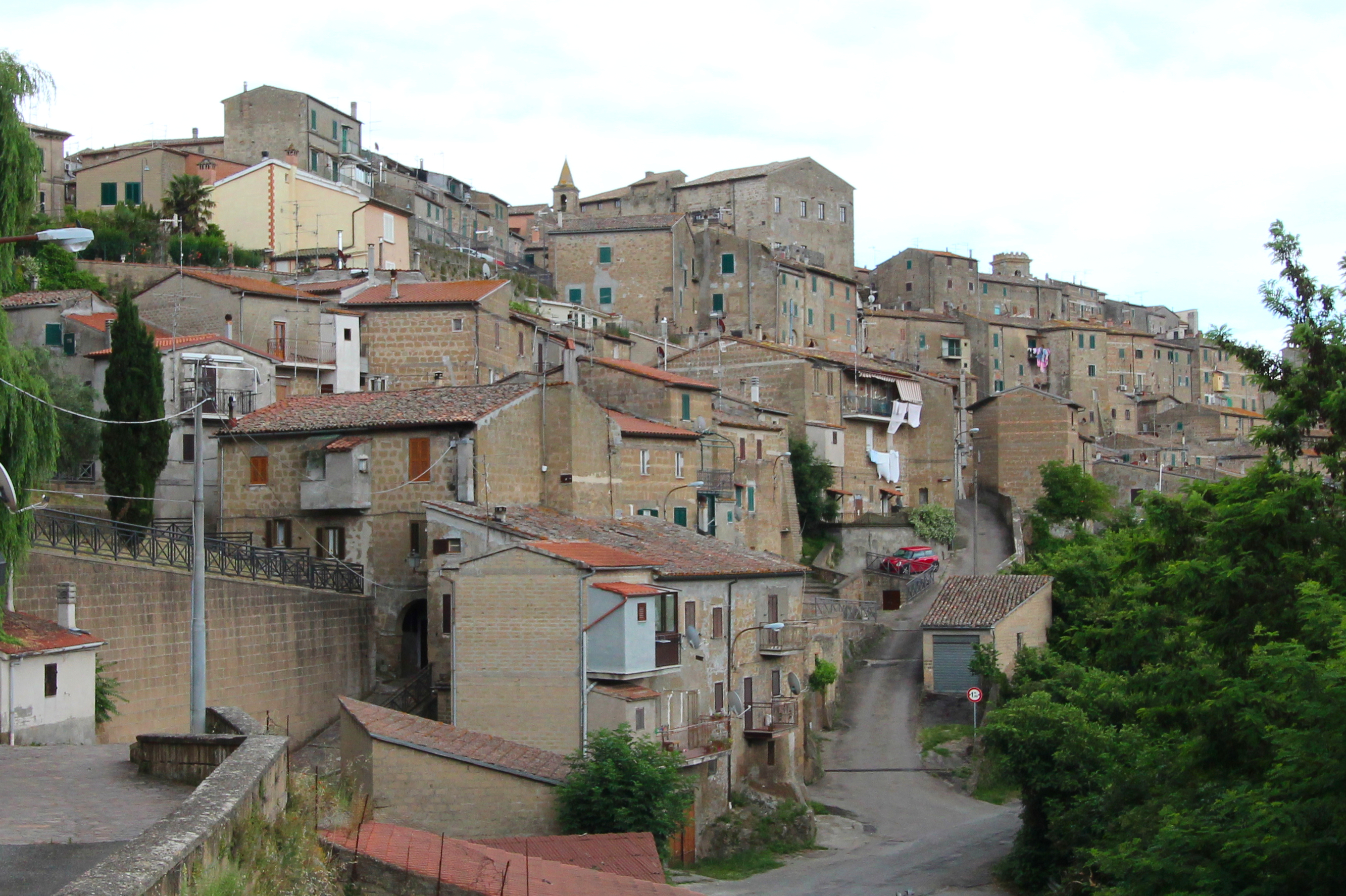

- Location within Italy Location within Lazio
- Coordinates: 42°41′N 11°49′E
- Country: Italy
- Region: Lazio
- Province: Viterbo (VT)

Government
  - Mayor: Pacifico Biribicchi

Area
  - Total: 24.51 km^{2} (9.46 sq mi)
- Elevation: 510 m (1,670 ft)

Population (31 December 2017)
  - Total: 990
  - Density: 40/km^{2} (100/sq mi)
- Demonym: Onanesi
- Time zone: UTC+1 (CET)
  - Summer (DST): UTC+2 (CEST)
- Postal code: 01010
- Dialing code: 0763
- Website: Official website

Onano is a comune (municipality) in the Province of Viterbo in the Italian region Lazio, located about 100 kilometres (62 mi) northwest of Rome and about 40 kilometres (25 mi) northwest of Viterbo.

Onano borders the following municipalities: Acquapendente, Gradoli, Grotte di Castro, Latera, Sorano. Alongside Ala, Ateleta, Orero and Siris. It is one of five Italian municipalities with a palindromic name.
