= Ateleta =

- Comune
- Comune di Ateleta
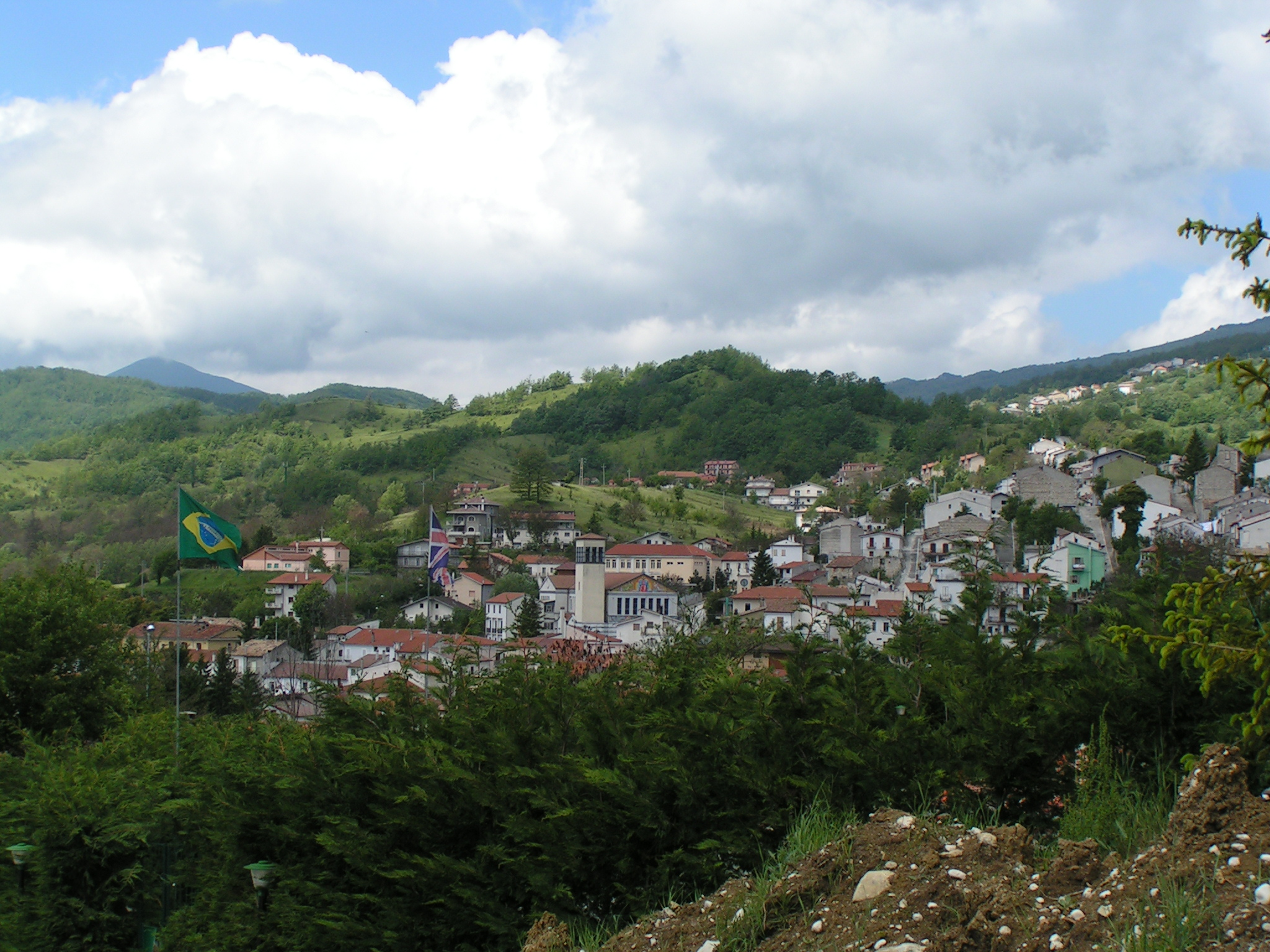

- Location within Italy Location within Abruzzo
- Coordinates: 41°51′23″N 14°11′54″E
- Country: Italy
- Region: Abruzzo
- Province: L'Aquila (AQ)
- Frazioni: Carceri Alte, Carceri Basse, Colli, Sant'Elena

Government
  - Mayor: Marco Passalacqua (since 2020)

Area
  - Total: 41.62 km^{2} (16.07 sq mi)
- Elevation: 760 m (2,490 ft)

Population (25 April 2024)
  - Total: 1,101
  - Density: 26.45/km^{2} (68.51/sq mi)
- Demonym: Ateletesi
- Time zone: UTC+1 (CET)
  - Summer (DST): UTC+2 (CEST)
- Postal code: 67030
- Dialing code: 0864
- Patron saint: St. Vincent Ferrer
- Saint day: April 5

Ateleta is a comune and town in the province of L'Aquila in the Abruzzo region of central-southern Italy. Alongside Ala, Onano, Orero and Siris, it is one of five Italian municipalities with a palindromic name.
