= Orero, Liguria =

Orero Oê
- Comune
- Comune di Orero
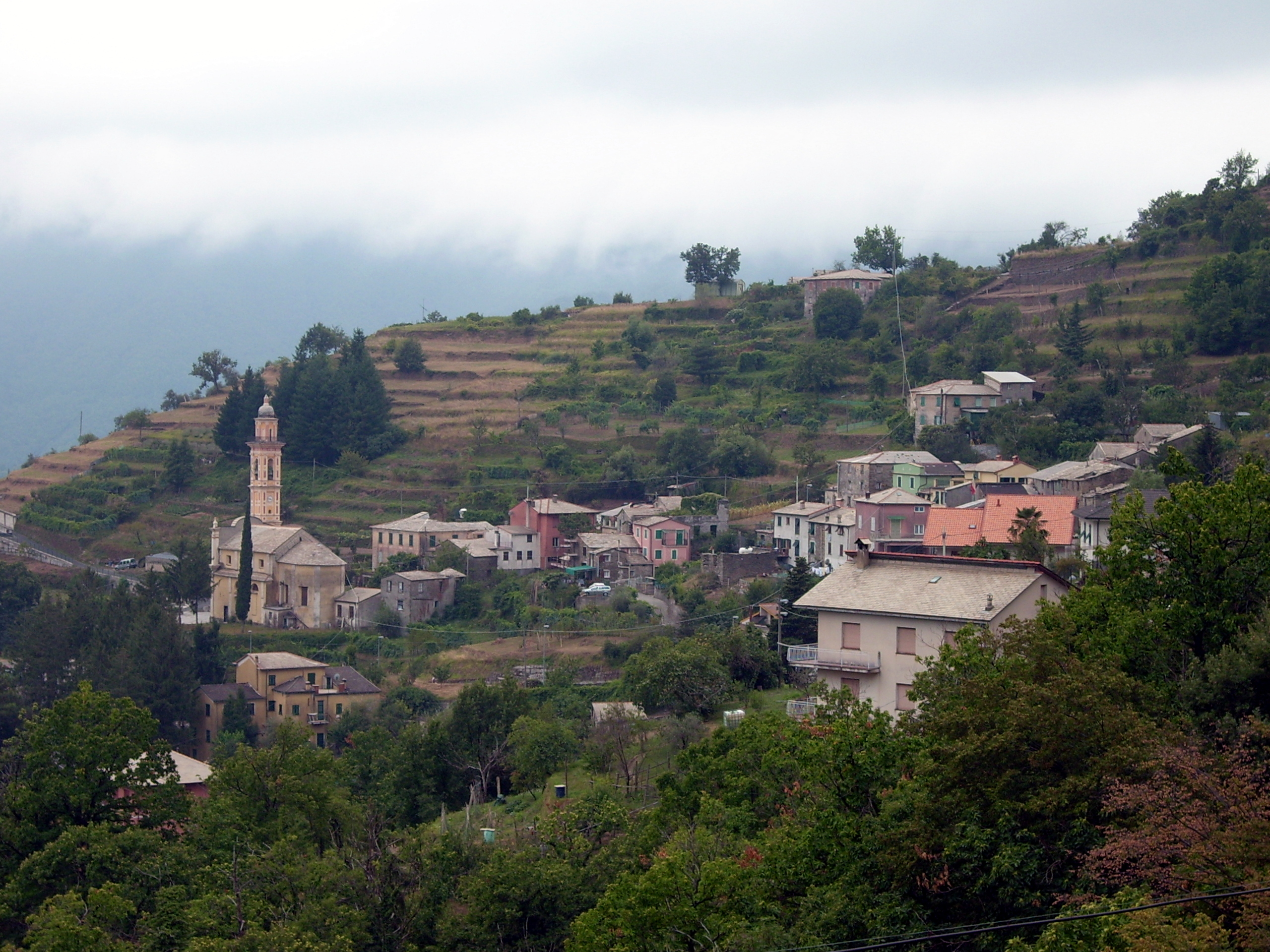

- Coat of arms

- Location within Italy Location within Liguria
- Coordinates: 44°24′N 9°17′E
- Country: Italy
- Region: Liguria
- Metropolitan city: Genoa (GE)
- Frazioni: Isolona (municipality seat), Pian dei Ratti, Soglio

Government
  - Mayor: Christian Pecchia

Area
  - Total: 15.8 km^{2} (6.1 sq mi)
- Elevation: 438 m (1,437 ft)

Population (31 May 2022)
  - Total: 499
  - Density: 31.6/km^{2} (81.8/sq mi)
- Demonym: Oreresi
- Time zone: UTC+1 (CET)
  - Summer (DST): UTC+2 (CEST)
- Postal code: 16010
- Dialing code: 0185
- Patron saint: St. Ambrose
- Saint day: First Stepday in May and First Stepday after July 16
- Website: Official website

Orero (Ligurian: Oê) is a comune (municipality) in the Metropolitan City of Genoa in the Italian region Liguria, located about 30 kilometres (19 mi) east of Genoa.

Orero borders the following municipalities: Cicagna, Coreglia Ligure, Lorsica, Rezzoaglio, San Colombano Certénoli. Alongside Ala, Ateleta, Onano and Siris, it is one of five Italian municipalities with a palindromic name.
