= Gonnoscodina =

- Comune
- Comune di Gonnoscodina
- Coat of arms

- Location within Sardinia
- Coordinates: 39°42′N 8°50′E
- Country: Italy
- Region: Sardinia
- Province: Oristano (OR)

Government
  - Mayor: Luciano Frau

Area
  - Total: 8.9 km^{2} (3.4 sq mi)
- Elevation: 112 m (367 ft)

Population (30 November 2010)
  - Total: 515
  - Density: 58/km^{2} (150/sq mi)
- Demonym(s): Gonnoscodinesi; Gonnoscodinesus
- Time zone: UTC+1 (CET)
  - Summer (DST): UTC+2 (CEST)
- Postal code: 09090
- Dialing code: 0783
- Website: Official website

Gonnoscodina, Gonnos-Codina in sardinian language, is a comune (municipality) in the Province of Oristano in the Italian region Sardinia, located about 60 kilometres (37 mi) northwest of Cagliari and about 30 kilometres (19 mi) southeast of Oristano.

Gonnoscodina borders the following municipalities: Baressa, Gonnostramatza, Masullas, Siddi, Simala.
