= Uras, Sardinia =

Municipality in Sardinia, Italy

Uras
- Comune
- Comune di Uras
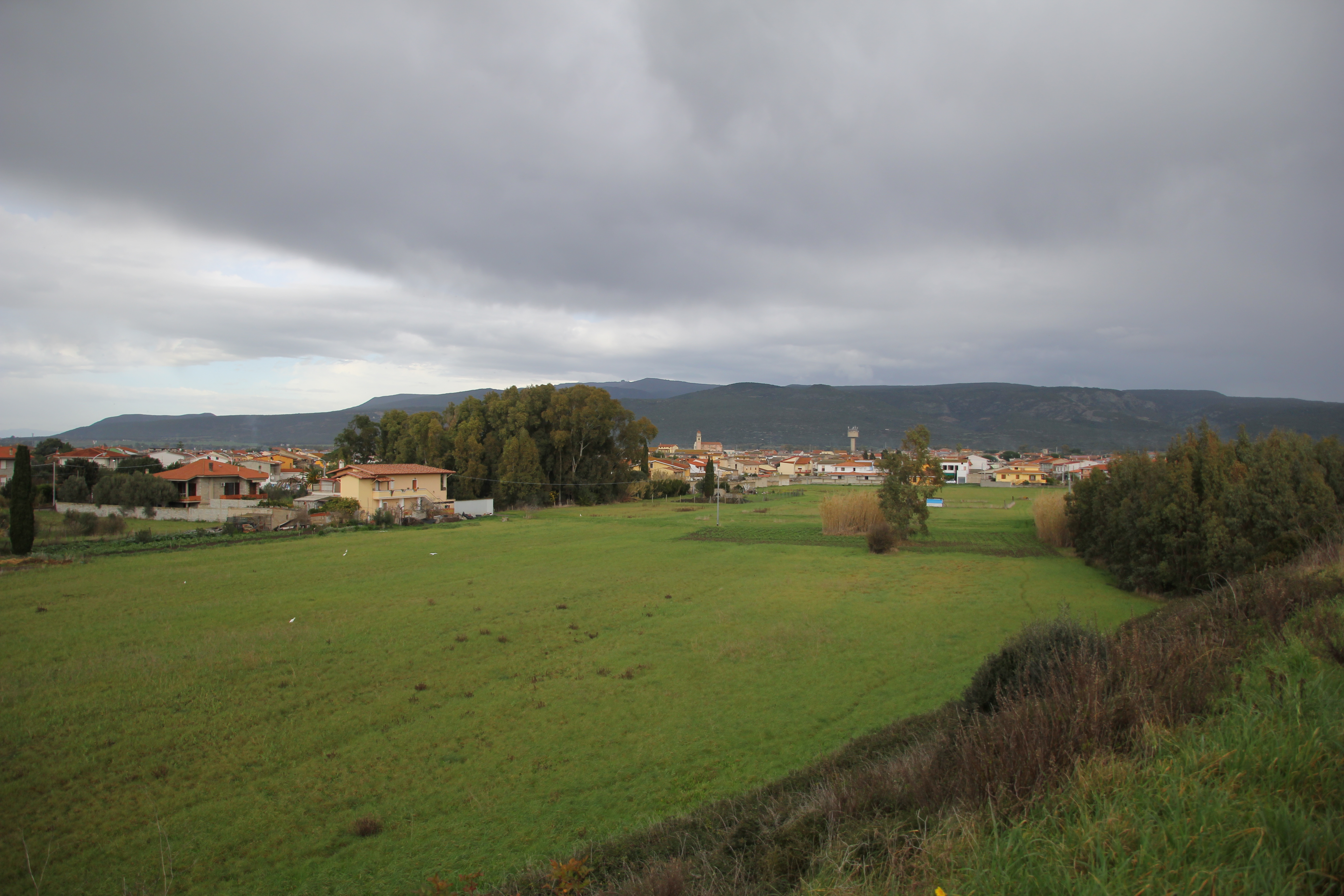

- Location within Sardinia
- Coordinates: 39°42′N 8°42′E
- Country: Italy
- Region: Sardinia
- Province: Province of Oristano (OR)

Government
  - Mayor: Samuele Fenu (Democratic Party)

Area
  - Total: 39.4 km^{2} (15.2 sq mi)
- Elevation: 23 m (75 ft)

Population (Aug. 2022)
  - Total: 2,713
  - Density: 68.9/km^{2} (178/sq mi)
- Time zone: UTC+1 (CET)
  - Summer (DST): UTC+2 (CEST)
- Postal code: 09099
- Dialing code: 0783

Uras is a comune (municipality) in the Province of Oristano in the Italian region Sardinia, located about 60 kilometres (37 mi) northwest of Cagliari and about 25 kilometres (16 mi) southeast of Oristano. As of 8 July 2022, it had a population of 2,714 and an area of 39.4 square kilometres (15.2 mi^{2}).

Uras borders the following municipalities: Marrubiu, Masullas, Mogoro, Morgongiori, San Nicolò d'Arcidano, Terralba.

== Demographic evolution ==
Historical population

Year	Pop.	±%
1861	2,170	—
1871	2,221	+2.4%
1881	2,238	+0.8%
1901	2,005	−10.4%
1911	2,276	+13.5%

Year	Pop.	±%
1921	2,316	+1.8%
1931	2,624	+13.3%
1936	2,913	+11.0%
1951	3,280	+12.6%
1961	3,387	+3.3%

Year	Pop.	±%
1971	3,481	+2.8%
1981	3,451	−0.9%
1991	3,377	−2.1%
2001	3,106	−8.0%

Source: Data from ISTAT

== Culture ==
The culture in Uras is mostly unimpacted from tourist spots and focused on agricultural life. Uras is surrounded by the countryside, and this shapes their culture as winemakers, farmers, and foragers. Their food is simple and uses mostly organic ingredients. In Uras, most people speak Sardinian and Italian.

== Produce ==
Wine in Uras is also an annual tradition where families get together at the end of the growing season (mostly in September) and help with the picking of the grapes and the whole process related to the making of the wine. Families will share lunches for days in a row and spend days together celebrating the harvest. Then the whole process will continue indoors with skilled people that have experience with handling and storing it correctly.

Another produce that is produced in the families of this village is organic olive oil. In the countryside, there are many olive trees, and families keep preferring their organic produce over the industrialization of this product.
