= Nurachi =

- Comune
- Comune di Nurachi
- Location within Sardinia
- Coordinates: 39°58′N 8°32′E
- Country: Italy
- Region: Sardinia
- Province: Province of Oristano (OR)

Area
  - Total: 15.9 km^{2} (6.1 sq mi)

Population (Dec. 2004)
  - Total: 1,671
  - Density: 105/km^{2} (272/sq mi)
- Demonym: Nurachesi
- Time zone: UTC+1 (CET)
  - Summer (DST): UTC+2 (CEST)
- Postal code: 09070
- Dialing code: 0783
- Website: Official website

Nurachi is a comune (municipality) in the Province of Oristano in the Italian region Sardinia, located about 100 kilometres (62 mi) northwest of Cagliari and about 9 kilometres (6 mi) northwest of Oristano. As of 31 December 2004, it had a population of 1,671 and an area of 15.9 square kilometres (6.1 mi^{2}).

Nurachi borders the following municipalities: Baratili San Pietro, Cabras, Oristano, Riola Sardo.

== Demographic evolution ==
Historical population

Year	Pop.	±%
1861	791	—
1871	738	−6.7%
1881	806	+9.2%
1901	916	+13.6%
1911	957	+4.5%

Year	Pop.	±%
1921	856	−10.6%
1931	946	+10.5%
1936	1,099	+16.2%
1951	1,298	+18.1%
1961	1,384	+6.6%

Year	Pop.	±%
1971	1,401	+1.2%
1981	1,539	+9.9%
1991	1,533	−0.4%
2001	1,619	+5.6%

Source: Data from ISTAT
