= Montresta =

- Comune
- Comune di Montresta
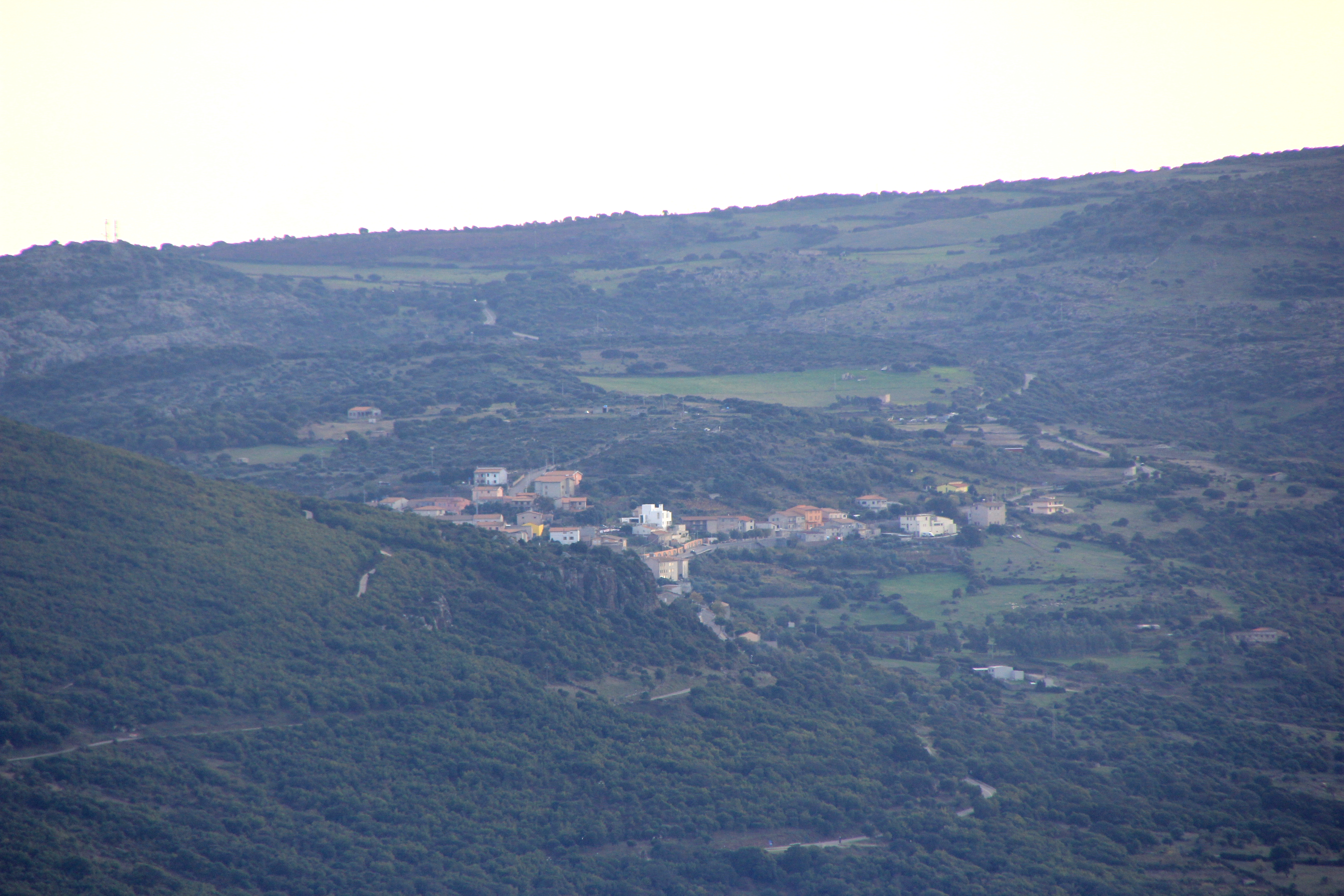

- Location within Sardinia
- Coordinates: 40°22′N 8°30′E
- Country: Italy
- Region: Sardinia
- Province: Province of Oristano (OR)

Area
  - Total: 23.8 km^{2} (9.2 sq mi)

Population (Dec. 2004)
  - Total: 594
  - Density: 25.0/km^{2} (64.6/sq mi)
- Demonym: Montrestini
- Time zone: UTC+1 (CET)
  - Summer (DST): UTC+2 (CEST)
- Postal code: 08010
- Dialing code: 0785

Montresta is a comune (municipality) in the Province of Oristano in the Italian region Sardinia, located about 140 kilometres (87 mi) northwest of Cagliari and about 50 kilometres (31 mi) north of Oristano. As of 31 December 2004, it had a population of 594 and an area of 23.8 square kilometres (9.2 mi^{2}).

In 1746 about fifty Greek families of Maniot descent residing in Cargèse (Corsica) emigrated to Sardinia, where they obtained from Carlo Emanuele III territories in the area of the Villa of San Cristoforo di Montresta to establish their new settlement.

Montresta borders the following municipalities: Bosa, Villanova Monteleone, Padria.

== Demographic evolution ==
Historical population

Year	Pop.	±%
1861	654	—
1871	766	+17.1%
1881	834	+8.9%
1901	944	+13.2%
1911	1,088	+15.3%

Year	Pop.	±%
1921	1,128	+3.7%
1931	1,310	+16.1%
1936	1,387	+5.9%
1951	1,469	+5.9%
1961	1,389	−5.4%

Year	Pop.	±%
1971	1,130	−18.6%
1981	982	−13.1%
1991	802	−18.3%
2001	650	−19.0%

Source: Data from ISTAT
