= Morgongiori =

Morgongiori Mragaxori
- Comune
- Comune di Morgongiori
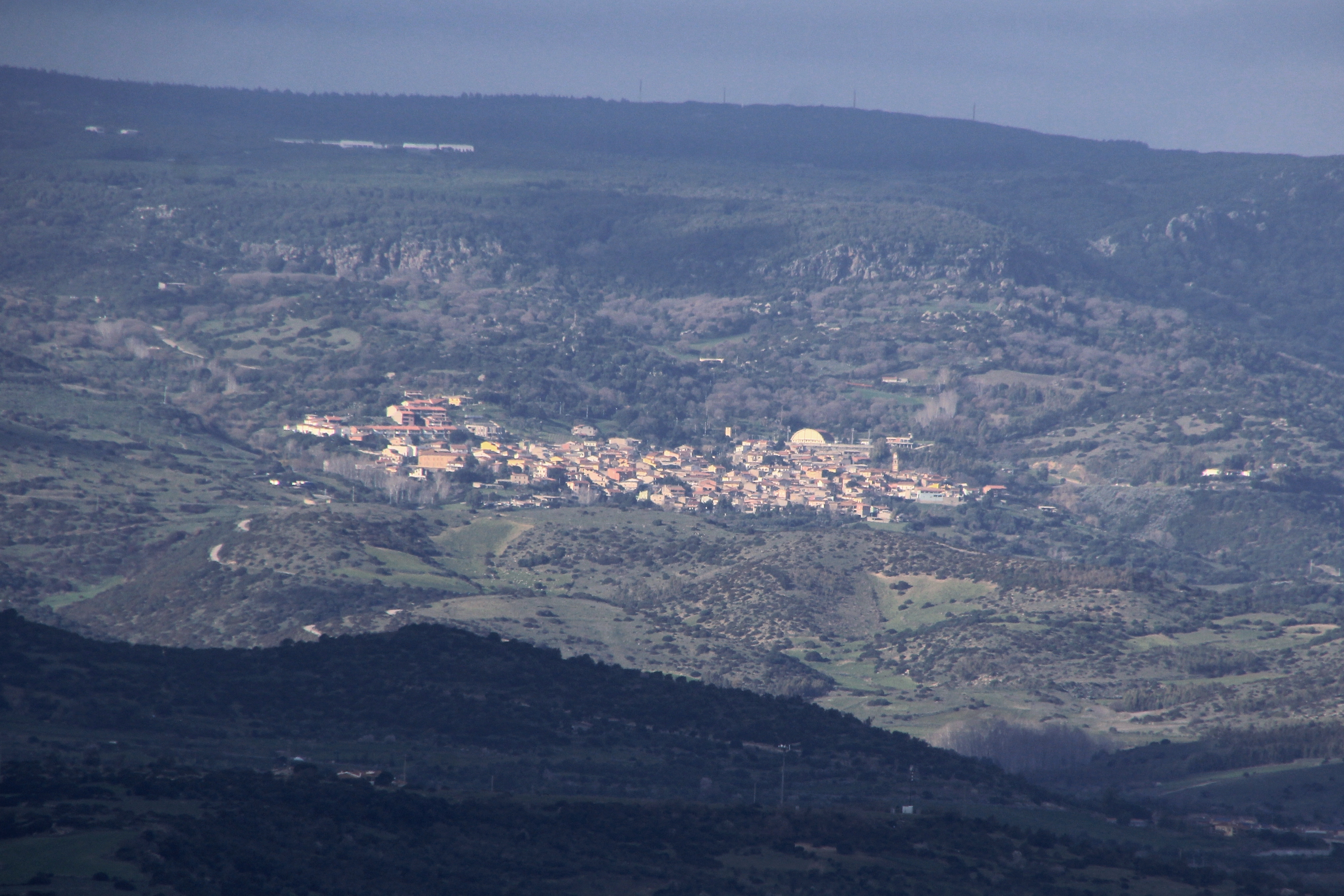

- Coat of arms

- Location within Sardinia
- Coordinates: 39°45′N 8°46′E
- Country: Italy
- Region: Sardinia
- Province: Oristano (OR)

Government
  - Mayor: Renzo Ibba

Area
  - Total: 45.3 km^{2} (17.5 sq mi)
- Elevation: 351 m (1,152 ft)

Population (31 May 2021)
  - Total: 669
  - Density: 14.8/km^{2} (38.2/sq mi)
- Demonym: Morgongioresi
- Time zone: UTC+1 (CET)
  - Summer (DST): UTC+2 (CEST)
- Postal code: 09090
- Dialing code: 0783
- Website: Official website

Morgongiori (Sardinian: Mragaxòri) is a comune (municipality) in the Province of Oristano in the Italian region Sardinia, located about 70 kilometres (43 mi) northwest of Cagliari and about 25 kilometres (16 mi) southeast of Oristano on the southern slopes of Monte Arci.

Morgongiori borders the following municipalities: Ales, Curcuris, Marrubiu, Masullas, Pompu, Santa Giusta, Siris, Uras.
