= Pompu =

- Comune
- Comune di Pompu
- Coat of arms

- Location within Sardinia
- Coordinates: 39°44′N 8°48′E
- Country: Italy
- Region: Sardinia
- Province: Oristano (OR)

Government
  - Mayor: Moreno Atzei

Area
  - Total: 5.1 km^{2} (2.0 sq mi)
- Elevation: 147 m (482 ft)

Population (31 November 2009)
  - Total: 290
  - Density: 57/km^{2} (150/sq mi)
- Demonym: Pompesi
- Time zone: UTC+1 (CET)
  - Summer (DST): UTC+2 (CEST)
- Postal code: 09095
- Dialing code: 0783

Pompu is a comune (municipality) in the Province of Oristano in the Italian region Sardinia, located about 60 kilometres (37 mi) northwest of Cagliari and about 25 kilometres (16 mi) southeast of Oristano.

Pompu borders the following municipalities: Curcuris, Masullas, Morgongiori, Simala, Siris. It is home to the Nuragic archaeological site of Prabanta.
