= Curcuris =

Curcuris Crucuris
- Comune
- Comune di Curcuris
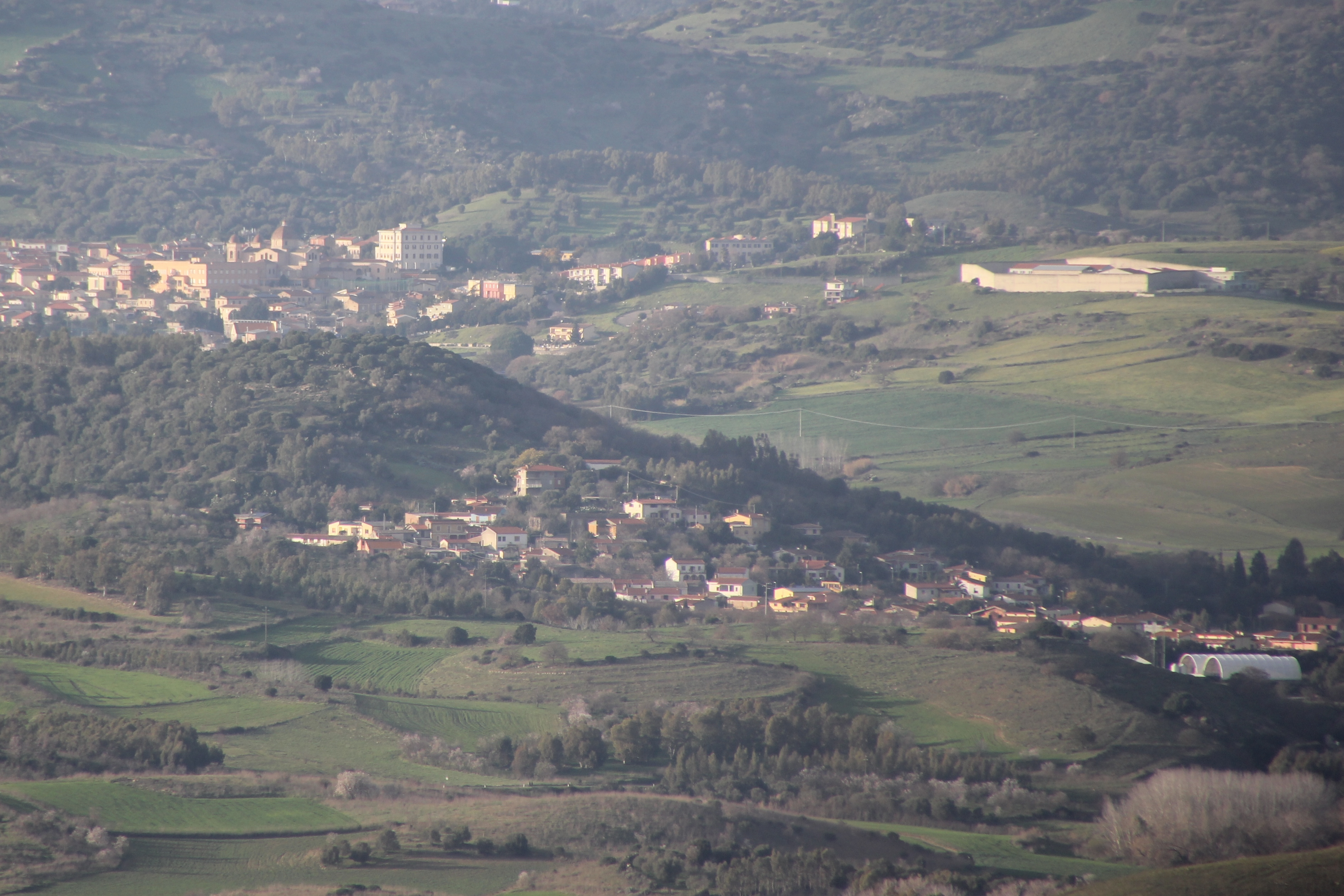

- Coat of arms

- Location within Sardinia
- Coordinates: 39°45′N 8°50′E
- Country: Italy
- Region: Sardinia
- Province: Oristano (OR)

Government
  - Mayor: Giorgio Pilloni

Area
  - Total: 8.1 km^{2} (3.1 sq mi)
- Elevation: 159 m (522 ft)

Population (Dec. 2004)
  - Total: 320
  - Density: 40/km^{2} (100/sq mi)
- Demonym(s): Crucuresus; Curcuresi
- Time zone: UTC+1 (CET)
  - Summer (DST): UTC+2 (CEST)
- Postal code: 09090
- Dialing code: 0783

Curcuris (Sardinian: Crucùris) is a comune (municipality) in the Province of Oristano in the Italian region Sardinia, located about 60 kilometres (37 mi) northwest of Cagliari and about 25 kilometres (16 mi) southeast of Oristano.

Curcuris borders the following municipalities: Ales, Gonnosnò, Morgongiori, Pompu, Simala.
