= Terralba =

Terralba Terraba
- Comune
- Comune di Terralba
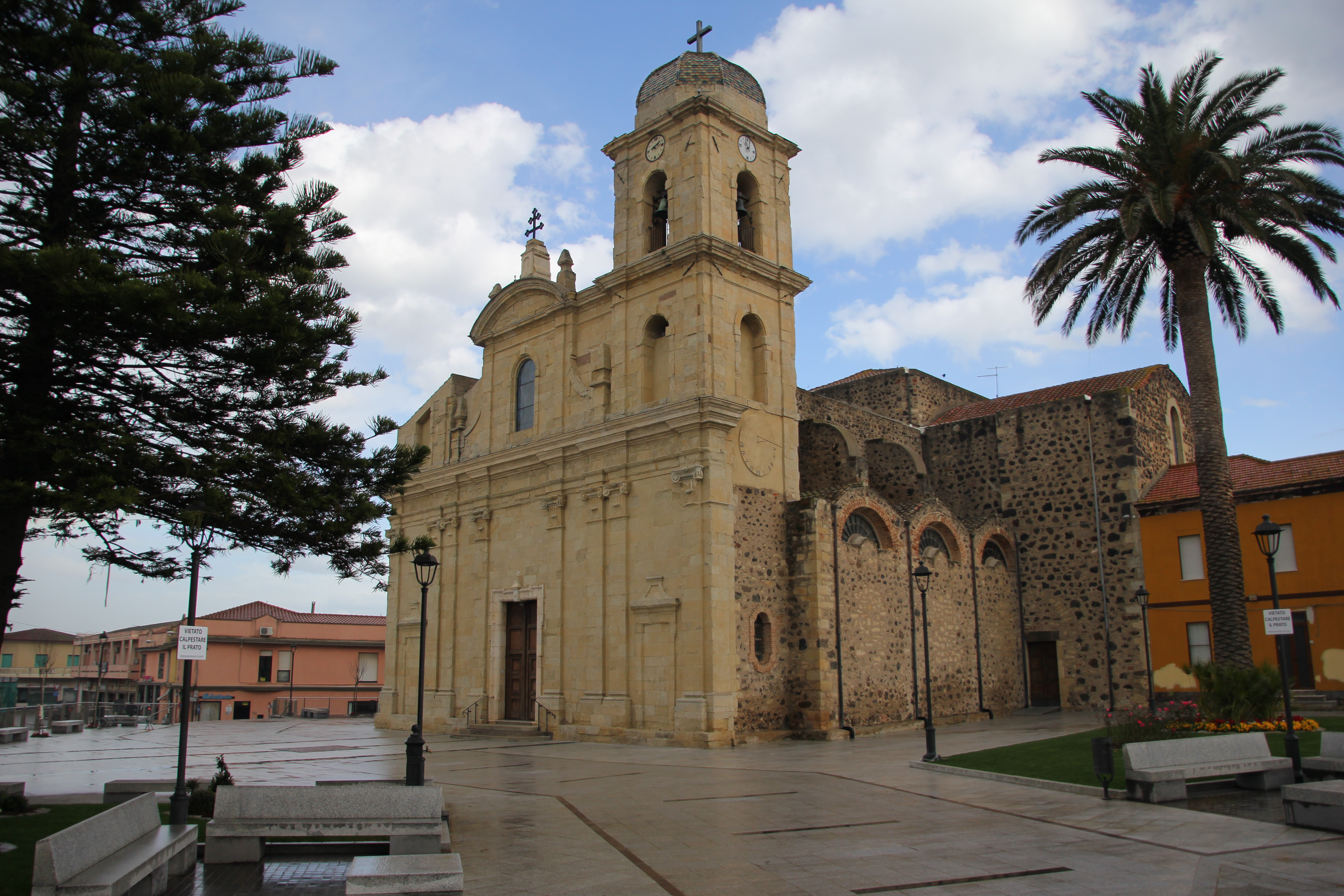
- Terralba's Cathedral

- Location within Sardinia
- Coordinates: 39°43′N 8°38′E
- Country: Italy
- Region: Sardinia
- Province: Oristano (OR)
- Frazioni: Marceddì e Tanca Marchese

Government
  - Mayor: Sandro Pili

Area
  - Total: 49.8 km^{2} (19.2 sq mi)
- Elevation: 9 m (30 ft)

Population (30 November 2017)
  - Total: 10,201
  - Density: 205/km^{2} (531/sq mi)
- Demonym: Terralbesi
- Time zone: UTC+1 (CET)
  - Summer (DST): UTC+2 (CEST)
- Postal code: 09098
- Dialing code: 0783
- Website: Official website

Terralba (Sardinian: Terraba) is a comune (municipality) and former Latin Catholic bishopric in the Province of Oristano in the Italian island region Sardinia, located about 70 kilometres (43 mi) northwest of Cagliari and about 20 kilometres (12 mi) south of Oristano.

Terralba borders the following municipalities: Arborea, Arbus, Guspini, Marrubiu, San Nicolò d'Arcidano and Uras.
