= Marrubiu =

Marrubiu Marrùbiu
- Comune
- Comune di Marrubiu
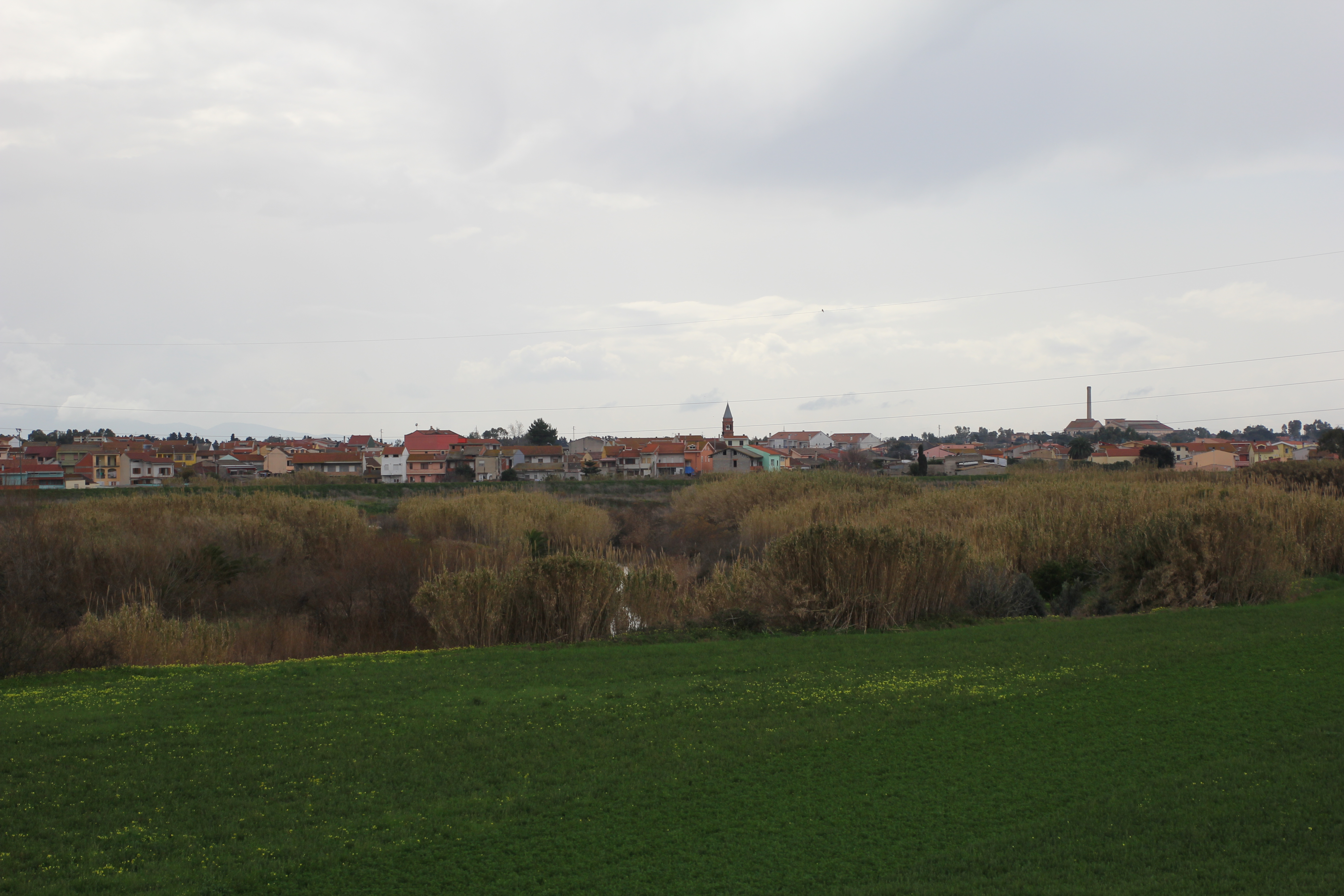
- Marrubiu-Terralba-Arborea railway station

- Location within Sardinia
- Coordinates: 39°45′N 8°38′E
- Country: Italy
- Region: Sardinia
- Province: Oristano (OR)

Government
  - Mayor: Andrea Santucciu

Area
  - Total: 61.24 km^{2} (23.64 sq mi)
- Elevation: 7 m (23 ft)

Population (30 September 2017)
  - Total: 4,816
  - Density: 78.64/km^{2} (203.7/sq mi)
- Demonym(s): Marrubiesi, Marrubiesus
- Time zone: UTC+1 (CET)
  - Summer (DST): UTC+2 (CEST)
- Postal code: 09094
- Dialing code: 0783
- Website: Official website

Marrubiu (Marrùbiu in the Sardinian language) is a comune (municipality) in the Province of Oristano in the Italian region Sardinia, located about 70 kilometres (43 mi) northwest of Cagliari and about 15 kilometres (9 mi) south of Oristano.

Marrubiu borders the following municipalities: Ales, Arborea, Morgongiori, Santa Giusta, Terralba, Uras.
