= Siris, Sardinia =

Siris
- Comune
- Comune di Siris
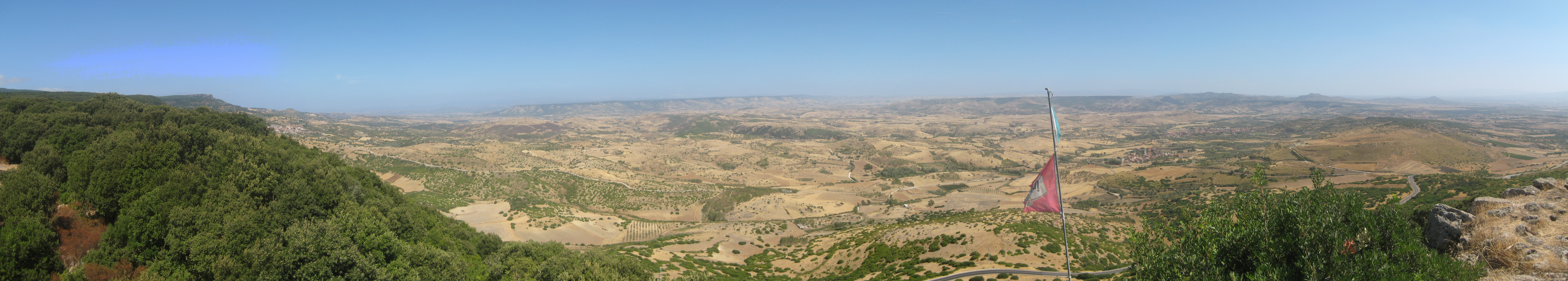
- View of Siris, Masullas and Giara of Gesturi from the nuraghe of Inus

- Location within Sardinia
- Coordinates: 39°42′44″N 8°46′27″E
- Country: Italy
- Region: Sardinia
- Province: Province of Oristano (OR)

Government
  - Mayor: Emanuele Pilloni

Area
  - Total: 6.0 km^{2} (2.3 sq mi)

Population (Dec. 2004)
  - Total: 235
  - Density: 39/km^{2} (100/sq mi)
- Time zone: UTC+1 (CET)
  - Summer (DST): UTC+2 (CEST)
- Postal code: 09090
- Dialing code: 0783

Siris is a comune (municipality) in the Province of Oristano in the Italian region Sardinia, located about 60 kilometres (37 mi) northwest of Cagliari and about 25 kilometres (16 mi) southeast of Oristano. As of 31 December 2004, it had a population of 235 and an area of 6.0 square kilometres (2.3 mi^{2}).

Siris borders the following municipalities: Masullas, Morgongiori, Pompu. Alongside Ala, Ateleta, Onano and Orero, it is one of five Italian municipalities with a palindromic name.

== Demographic evolution ==
Historical population

Year	Pop.	±%
1861	205	—
1871	224	+9.3%
1881	192	−14.3%
1901	182	−5.2%
1911	211	+15.9%

Year	Pop.	±%
1921	191	−9.5%
1931	197	+3.1%
1936	201	+2.0%
1951	267	+32.8%
1961	283	+6.0%

Year	Pop.	±%
1971	290	+2.5%
1981	259	−10.7%
1991	261	+0.8%
2001	249	−4.6%

Source: Data from ISTAT
