= Simala =

Simala Simaba
- Comune
- Comune di Simala
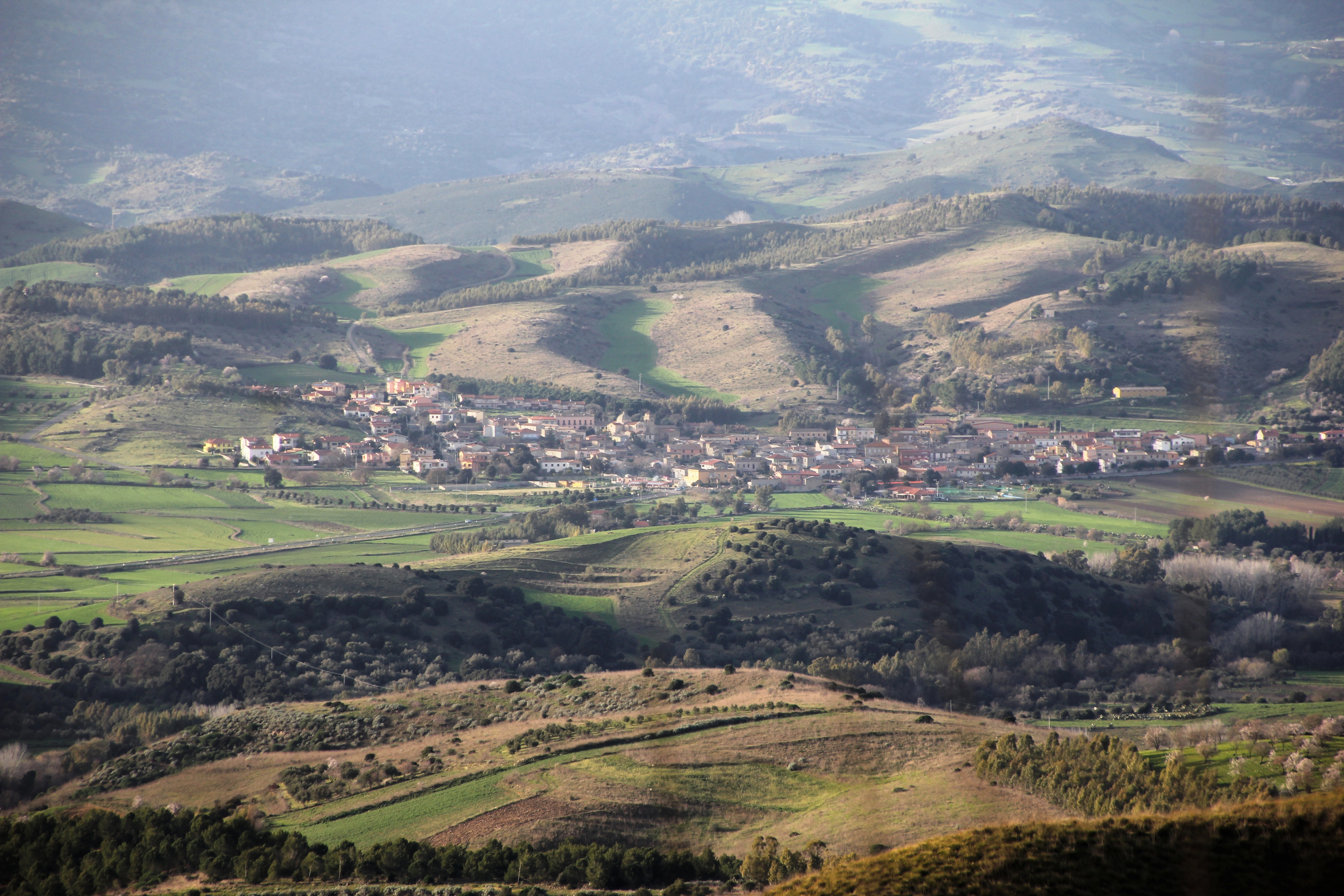

- Coat of arms

- Location within Sardinia
- Coordinates: 39°43′N 8°50′E
- Country: Italy
- Region: Sardinia
- Province: Oristano (OR)

Government
  - Mayor: Giorgio Scano

Area
  - Total: 13.4 km^{2} (5.2 sq mi)
- Elevation: 155 m (509 ft)

Population (31 December 2010)
  - Total: 358
  - Density: 26.7/km^{2} (69.2/sq mi)
- Time zone: UTC+1 (CET)
  - Summer (DST): UTC+2 (CEST)
- Postal code: 09090
- Dialing code: 0783

Simala (Sardinian: Sìmaba) is a comune (municipality) in the Province of Oristano in the Italian region Sardinia, located about 60 kilometres (37 mi) northwest of Cagliari and about 30 kilometres (19 mi) southeast of Oristano.

Simala borders the following municipalities: Baressa, Curcuris, Gonnoscodina, Gonnosnò, Masullas, Pompu.
