= Masullas =

Masullas Masuddas
- Comune
- Comune di Masullas
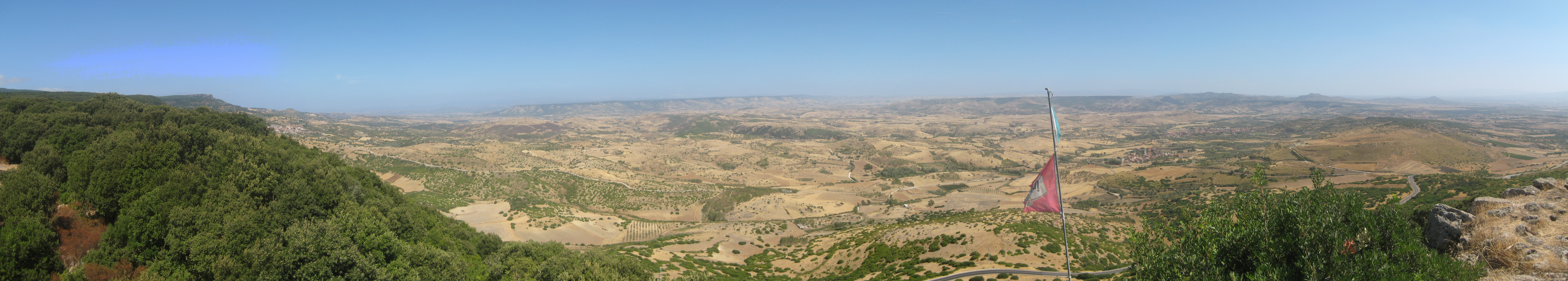
- View of Siris, Masullas and Giara of Gesturi from the nuraghe of Inus

- Coat of arms

- Location within Sardinia
- Coordinates: 39°42′N 8°47′E
- Country: Italy
- Region: Sardinia
- Province: Oristano (OR)

Government
  - Mayor: Ennio Vacca (Civic list)

Area
  - Total: 18.9 km^{2} (7.3 sq mi)
- Elevation: 129 m (423 ft)

Population (31-03-2024)
  - Total: 1,002
  - Density: 53.0/km^{2} (137/sq mi)
- Demonym: Masullesi
- Time zone: UTC+1 (CET)
  - Summer (DST): UTC+2 (CEST)
- Postal code: 09090
- Dialing code: 0783
- Patron saint: Our Lady of Graces
- Saint day: July 2
- Website: Official website

Masullas, Masuddas in sardinian language, is a comune (municipality) in the Province of Oristano in the Italian region Sardinia, located about 60 kilometres (37 mi) northwest of Cagliari and about 30 kilometres (19 mi) southeast of Oristano.

Masullas borders the following municipalities: Gonnoscodina, Gonnostramatza, Mogoro, Morgongiori, Pompu, Simala, Siris, Uras.

== History ==
The foundation of Masullas presumably dates back to the Roman period, as evidenced by the necropolis of Mitza Salida and Roia de sa lua. In the Roman period, basalt was used for the realisation of macine, even today we can find these macine.

During the Middle Ages Masullas was divided into two villages, each with a church: Church of Santa Lucia and Church of San Leonardo.

== Economy ==
In Masullas, agriculture and livestock farming are widespread. It is one of the municipalities that has focused heavily on tourism.

== Colture ==
=== Museums ===
In Masullas there are 3 museums:

- Geomuseo Monte Arci Stefano Incani, opened on the 2010 in the former convent of the Capuchin Friars Minor, it tells through a collection of minerals and fossils the geologic Volcano Arci.
- Museo I Cavalieri delle Colline, opened nel 2013, it tells the history of the racconta la storia of the aristocracy of Masullas and Parte Montis.It has weapons and documents.
- Museo di Storia Naturale Aquilegia, opened in the 2019 in the ex town hall, it is a natural history museaum. It was in Cagliariun miseo di storia naturale. Precedentemente presente a Cagliari, it was subsequently transferred in Masullas.

== Monuments and places of interest ==
=== Sacral architecture ===
==== Churches ====
- Church of the Blessed Virgin of Graces
- Church of San Leonardo
- Church of Santa Lucia
- Church and Convent of San Francesco

=== Archaeological sites ===
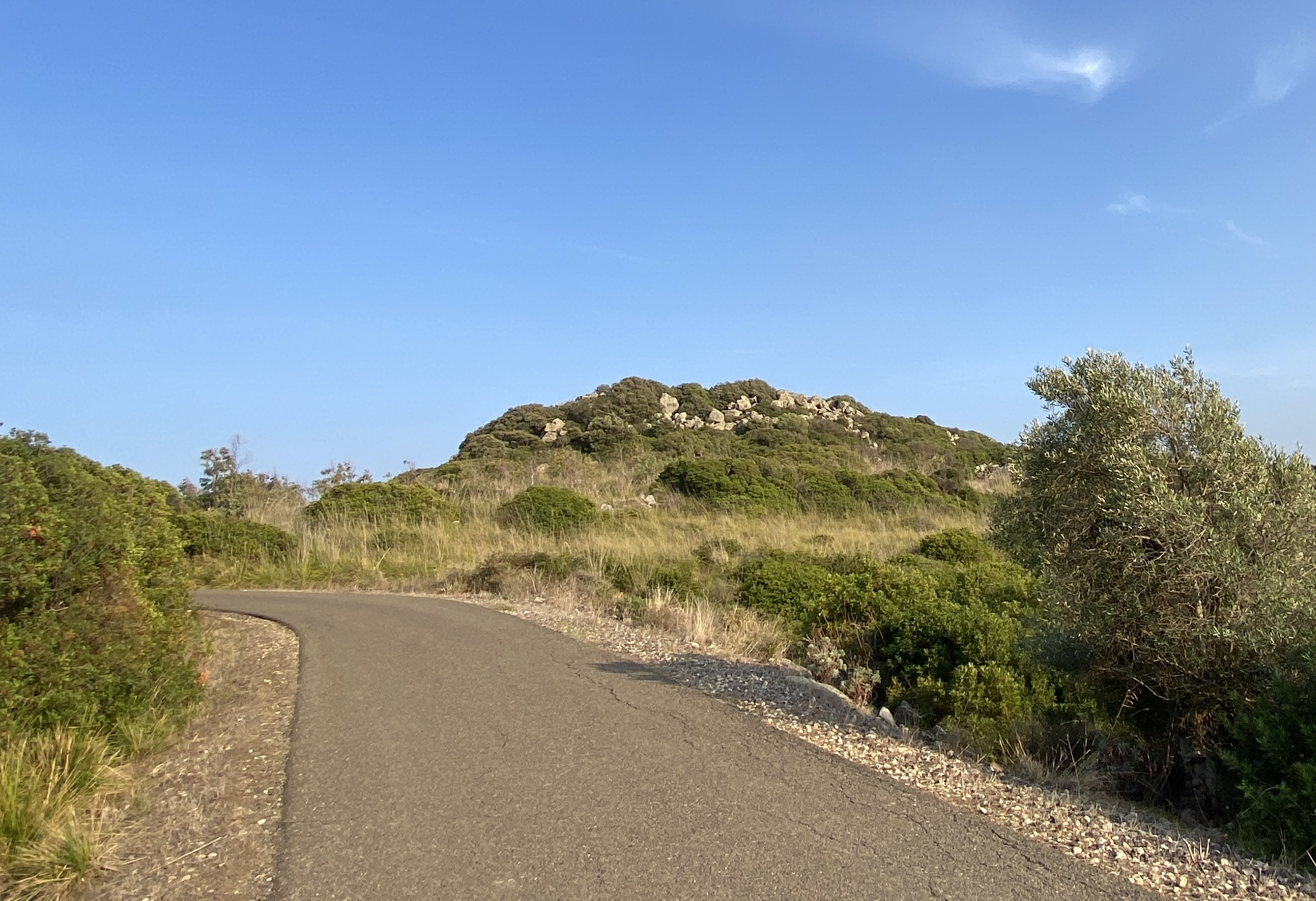
Nuragh Murranca

==== Nuraghes ====
In Masullas there are 12 nuraghes:

- nuragh Sa Forada Manna (Bia Mogoru)
- nuragh Corongiu Arrubiu
- nuragh de Preidis
- nuragh Monti Miana 1 e Monti Miana 2
- Nuragh Murranca (o Tramesu e Bruncu o Bissanticcu)
- nuragh Mustazzori (o Enna Pruna)
- nuragh perda e Masuddasa
- nuragh Onigu (o Nuraccioni)
- nuragh Sa Matta croccada
- nuragh Santu Stevi
- nuragh su Para
- Nuragh Tanca Tamis
