= Province of Oristano =

Province of Italy

Coordinates: 39°54′N 8°35′E

Province of Oristano Provincia di Oristano (Italian) Provìntzia de Aristanis (Sardinian)
- Province
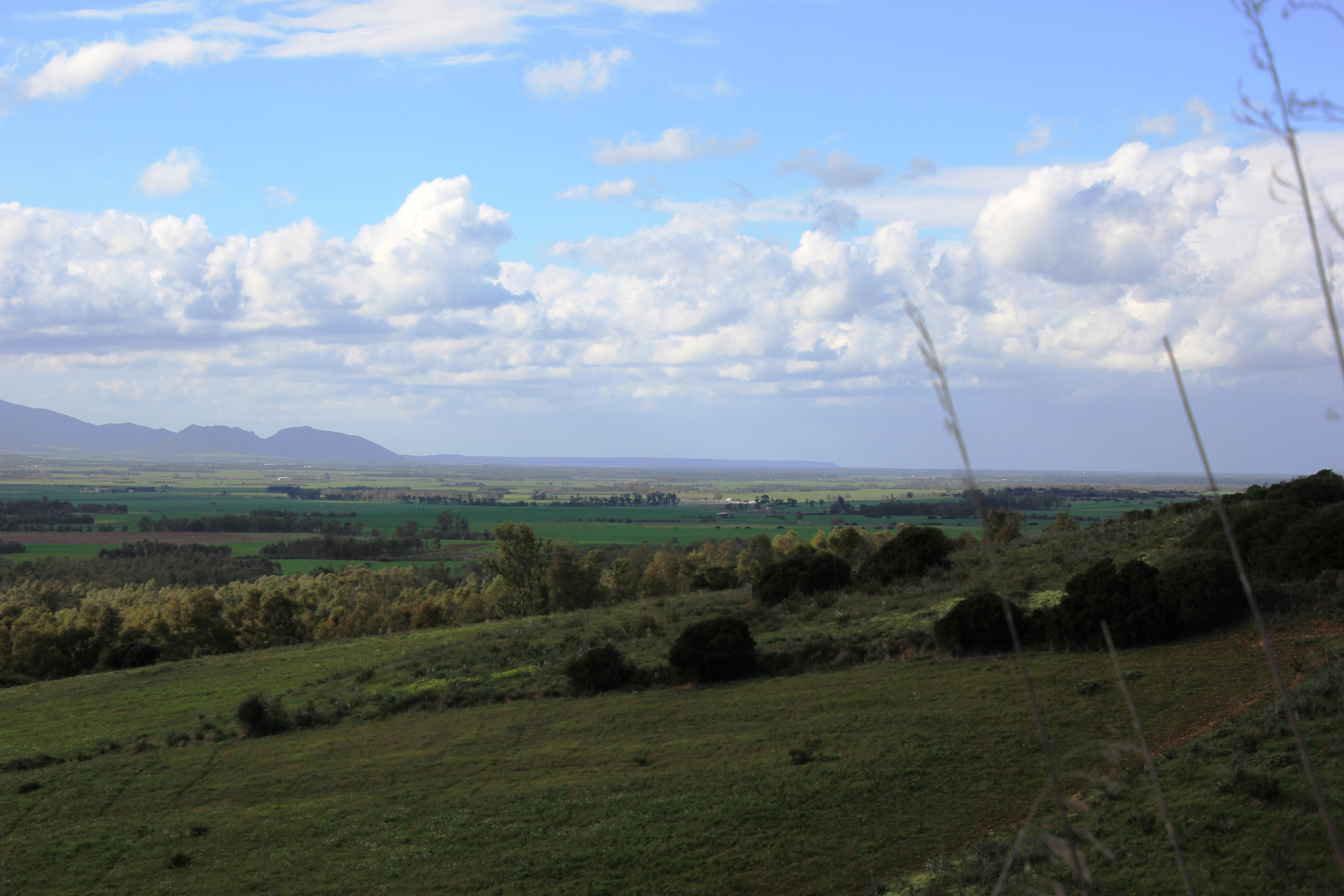
- A panorama of Oristanese Campidano

- Flag Coat of arms

- Location of the province of Oristano in Italy
- Country: Italy
- Region: Sardinia
- Capital(s): Oristano
- Municipalities: 87

Government
  - President: Paolo Pireddu

Area
  - Total: 2,990.45 km^{2} (1,154.62 sq mi)

Population (2026)
  - Total: 146,785
  - Density: 49.0846/km^{2} (127.128/sq mi)

GDP
  - Total: €2.831 billion (2015)
  - Per capita: €17,462 (2015)
- Time zone: UTC+1 (CET)
  - Summer (DST): UTC+2 (CEST)
- Postal code: 09020, 09070-09086, 09088-09099, 09170
- Telephone prefix: 0758, 0783, 0785, 0885
- Vehicle registration: OR
- ISTAT: 095

The province of Oristano (Italian: provincia di Oristano; Sardinian: provìntzia de Aristanis) is a province in the autonomous island region of Sardinia in Italy. Its capital is the city of Oristano.

As of 2026, the province has a population of 146,785 in an area of 2,990.45 square kilometres (1,154.62 mi^{2}) across its 87 municipalities.

It is bordered with on the north by province of Sassari, on east by the province of Nuoro, on south by the province of South Sardinia and it is bathed from the Sea of Sardinia to the west.

== Geography and history ==
The province of Oristano is the smallest province in Sardinia and was formed from sections of the provinces of Cagliari and Nuoro. It occupies roughly the same area as the Giudicato of Arborea of the High Middle Ages. It borders Nuoro, Cagliari and the Sea of Sardinia. A large area of the province's coastline is part of the gulf of Oristano, and the land in the province is mainly flat and there is some marshland. The province contains Santa Giusta (commune) and Tharros (former city), which both date from the Carthaginian Republic's rule of the area.

The town of Arborea was founded by Benito Mussolini's fascist regime as Mussolinia to be an experimental town, for which, farmers were moved from Emilia Romagna and Veneto. The River Tirso flows through the province of Oristano from the province of Nuoro, and its mouth is located at the Gulf of Oristano. Temo is the only other river to flow through the province. The town of Bosa is located in the region alongside a river and its medieval fortifications remain. The province of Oristano was formed in 1975 and had been largely unaffected by tourism.

== Government ==
=== Municipalities ===
The province has 87 municipalities:

- Abbasanta
- Aidomaggiore
- Albagiara
- Ales
- Allai
- Arborea
- Ardauli
- Assolo
- Asuni
- Baradili
- Baratili San Pietro
- Baressa
- Bauladu
- Bidonì
- Bonarcado
- Boroneddu
- Bosa
- Busachi
- Cabras
- Cuglieri
- Curcuris
- Flussio
- Fordongianus
- Ghilarza
- Gonnoscodina
- Gonnosnò
- Gonnostramatza
- Laconi
- Magomadas
- Marrubiu
- Masullas
- Milis
- Modolo
- Mogorella
- Mogoro
- Montresta
- Morgongiori
- Narbolia
- Neoneli
- Norbello
- Nughedu Santa Vittoria
- Nurachi
- Nureci
- Ollastra
- Oristano
- Palmas Arborea
- Pau
- Paulilatino
- Pompu
- Riola Sardo
- Ruinas
- Sagama
- Samugheo
- San Nicolò d'Arcidano
- Santa Giusta
- Santu Lussurgiu
- San Vero Milis
- Scano di Montiferro
- Sedilo
- Seneghe
- Senis
- Sennariolo
- Siamaggiore
- Siamanna
- Siapiccia
- Simala
- Simaxis
- Sini
- Siris
- Soddì
- Solarussa
- Sorradile
- Suni
- Tadasuni
- Terralba
- Tinnura
- Tramatza
- Tresnuraghes
- Ulà Tirso
- Uras
- Usellus
- Villanova Truschedu
- Villa Sant'Antonio
- Villaurbana
- Villa Verde
- Zeddiani
- Zerfaliu

== Demographics ==
As of 2026, the population is 146,785, of which 49.4% are male, and 50.6% are female. Minors make up 11.1% of the population, and seniors make up 30.7%.

Historical population

Year	Pop.	±%
1861	108,869	—
1871	113,074	+3.9%
1881	116,375	+2.9%
1901	118,423	+1.8%
1911	123,631	+4.4%
1921	127,239	+2.9%
1931	135,912	+6.8%
1936	144,960	+6.7%

Year	Pop.	±%
1951	162,520	+12.1%
1961	171,113	+5.3%
1971	165,521	−3.3%
1981	170,523	+3.0%
1991	171,973	+0.9%
2001	166,965	−2.9%
2011	163,031	−2.4%
2021	151,655	−7.0%

Source: ISTAT

=== Immigration ===
As of 2025, immigrants make up 4.2% of the total population. The 5 largest foreign countries of birth are Romania, Germany, Switzerland, France, and Morocco.
