= Arborea =

- Comune
- Comune di Arborea
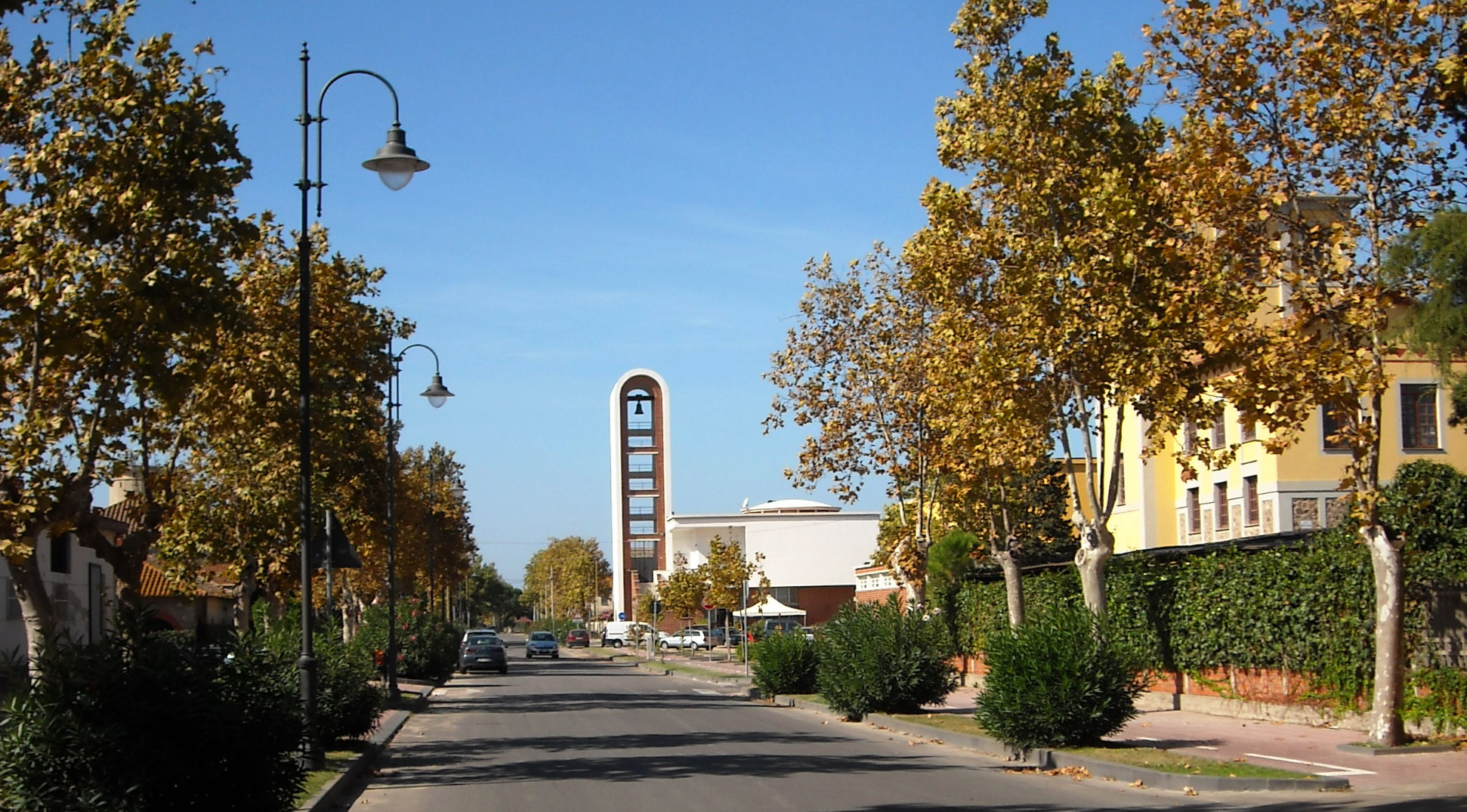
- Corso Italia street

- Coat of arms

- Location within Sardinia
- Coordinates: 39°46′N 08°35′E
- Country: Italy
- Region: Sardinia
- Province: Oristano
- Frazioni: Centro I, Centro II, S'Ungroni, Luri, Linnas, Torrevecchia, Pompongias

Government
  - Mayor: Manuela Pintus

Area
  - Total: 94.96 km^{2} (36.66 sq mi)
- Elevation: 7 m (23 ft)

Population (2026)
  - Total: 3,701
  - Density: 38.97/km^{2} (100.9/sq mi)
- Demonyms: Arborensi; Arborensus
- Time zone: UTC+1 (CET)
  - Summer (DST): UTC+2 (CEST)
- Postal code: 09092
- Dialing code: 0783
- Patron saint: St. John Bosco
- Saint day: 31 January
- Website: Official website

Arborea is a town and comune (municipality) in the Province of Oristano in the autonomous island region of Sardinia in Italy. It has 3,701 inhabitants.

Arborea borders the municipalities of Marrubiu, Santa Giusta, and Terralba.

== Name ==
Arborea is named after, and lies within, the medieval Giudicato of Arborea, which had its capital, at various periods, in nearby Tharros and Oristano. The town was originally named Villaggio Mussolini (with which it was inaugurated on 29 October 1928) by the fascist government in honor of the Italian fascist dictator Benito Mussolini. Less than two years later, the name was revised to Mussolinia di Sardegna ("Mussolinia of Sardinia", to distinguish the town from Mussolinia di Sicilia, now Santo Pietro in the commune of Caltagirone, Province of Catania). The current name was adopted after World War II.

== History ==
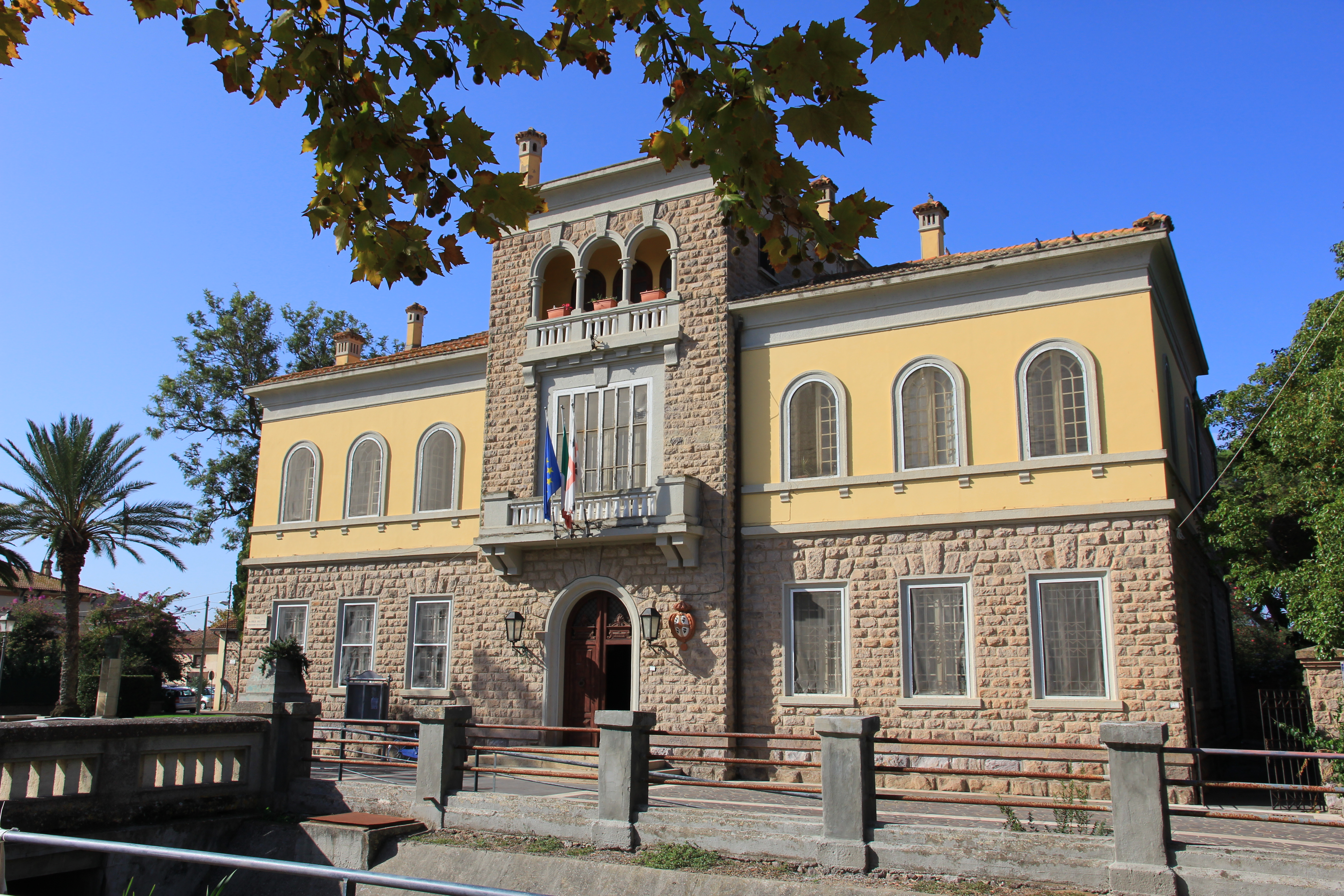
Town hall

Arborea was built by the fascist government of Italy in the 1920s, after the draining of the marshes which covered the area. The village was populated by families, mostly composed of peasants, who came from the regions of Veneto and Friuli in north-eastern Italy.

== Demographics ==
As of 2026, the population is 3,701, of which 49.8% are male, and 50.2% are female. Minors make up 12.9% of the population, and seniors make up 27.2%.

Historical population

Year	Pop.	±%
1861	56	—
1871	59	+5.4%
1881	63	+6.8%
1901	56	−11.1%
1911	60	+7.1%
1921	69	+15.0%
1931	2,168	+3042.0%
1936	3,636	+67.7%

Year	Pop.	±%
1951	4,167	+14.6%
1961	3,488	−16.3%
1971	3,088	−11.5%
1981	3,390	+9.8%
1991	3,785	+11.7%
2001	3,927	+3.8%
2011	4,048	+3.1%
2021	3,777	−6.7%

Source: ISTAT

=== Immigration ===
As of 2025, of the known countries of birth of 3,691 residents, the most numerous are: Italy (3,607 – 97.7%), India (22 – 0.6%).

== Economy ==
The economy is largely based on agriculture and cattle breeding with production of vegetables, rice, fruit and milk (notably the local milk product Arborea).

== Twin towns and sister cities ==
- Mortegliano, Italy
- Sermoneta, Italy
- Zevio, Italy
- Villorba, Italy
