= Oristano =

Oristano Aristanis (Sardinian)
- Comune
- Comune di Oristano
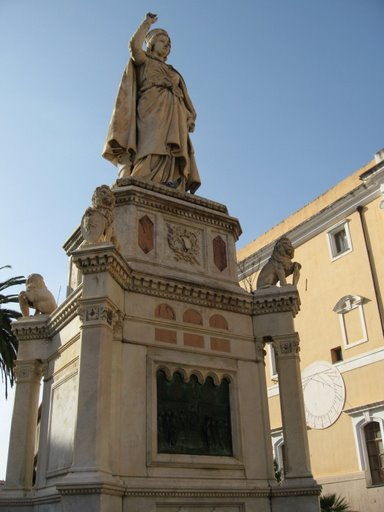
- Oristano: Statue of Eleanor of Arborea, holding the Carta de Logu in her hand, with the sundial on the wall of the City Hall in the backdrop.

- Flag Coat of arms

- Location within Sardinia
- Coordinates: 39°54′N 08°35′E
- Country: Italy
- Region: Sardinia
- Province: Oristano (OR)
- Frazioni: Donigala, Massama, Marina di Torre Grande, Nuraxinieddu, Silì, Torre Grande

Government
  - Mayor: Massimiliano Sanna

Area
  - Total: 84.57 km^{2} (32.65 sq mi)
- Elevation: 10 m (33 ft)

Population (2025)
  - Total: 30,007
  - Density: 354.8/km^{2} (919.0/sq mi)
- Demonym(s): Oristanesi; Aristanesus
- Time zone: UTC+1 (CET)
  - Summer (DST): UTC+2 (CEST)
- Postal code: 09170
- Dialing code: 0783
- Patron saint: St. Archelaus
- Saint day: February 13
- Website: Official website

Oristano (Italian: [oriˈstaːno]; Sardinian: Aristanis [aɾiˈstanizi]) is the capital and largest city of the Province of Oristano in the central-western part of the autonomous island region of Sardinia in Italy. It is located on the northern part of the Campidano plain. It was established as the provincial capital on 16 July 1974. As of 2025, with a population of 30,007, Oristano is the 7th-largest city in Sardinia.

The economy of Oristano is based mainly on services, agriculture, tourism and small industries.

== History ==
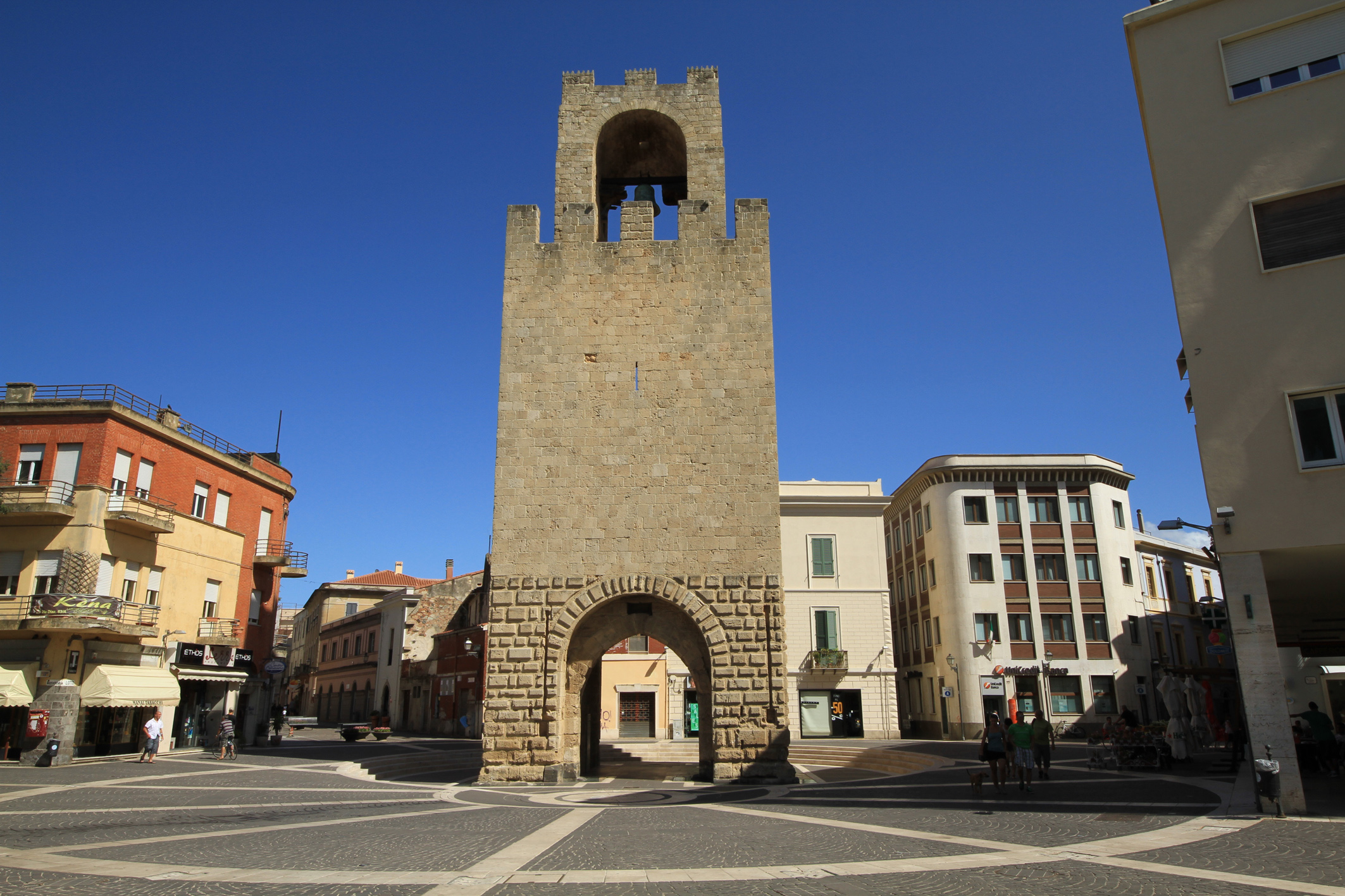
Port'a Ponti Door Tower in Piazza Roma

Oristano was previously known by the Byzantines as Aristiánēs Límnē (Byzantine Greek: ΑριστιάνηϚ λίμνη, lit. 'Pond of Oristano'), and founded close to the ancient Phoenician settlement of Othoca (now Santa Giusta). It acquired importance in 1070, when, as a result of the frequent Saracen attacks, Archbishop Torcotorio made it the seat of the bishopric, which was previously in the nearby coastal town of Tharros. It also became the capital of the "Judicate" (equivalent to a Kingdom) of Arborea. Consequently, fortifications were designed, but the building thereof went on until judge Mariano II rose to power.

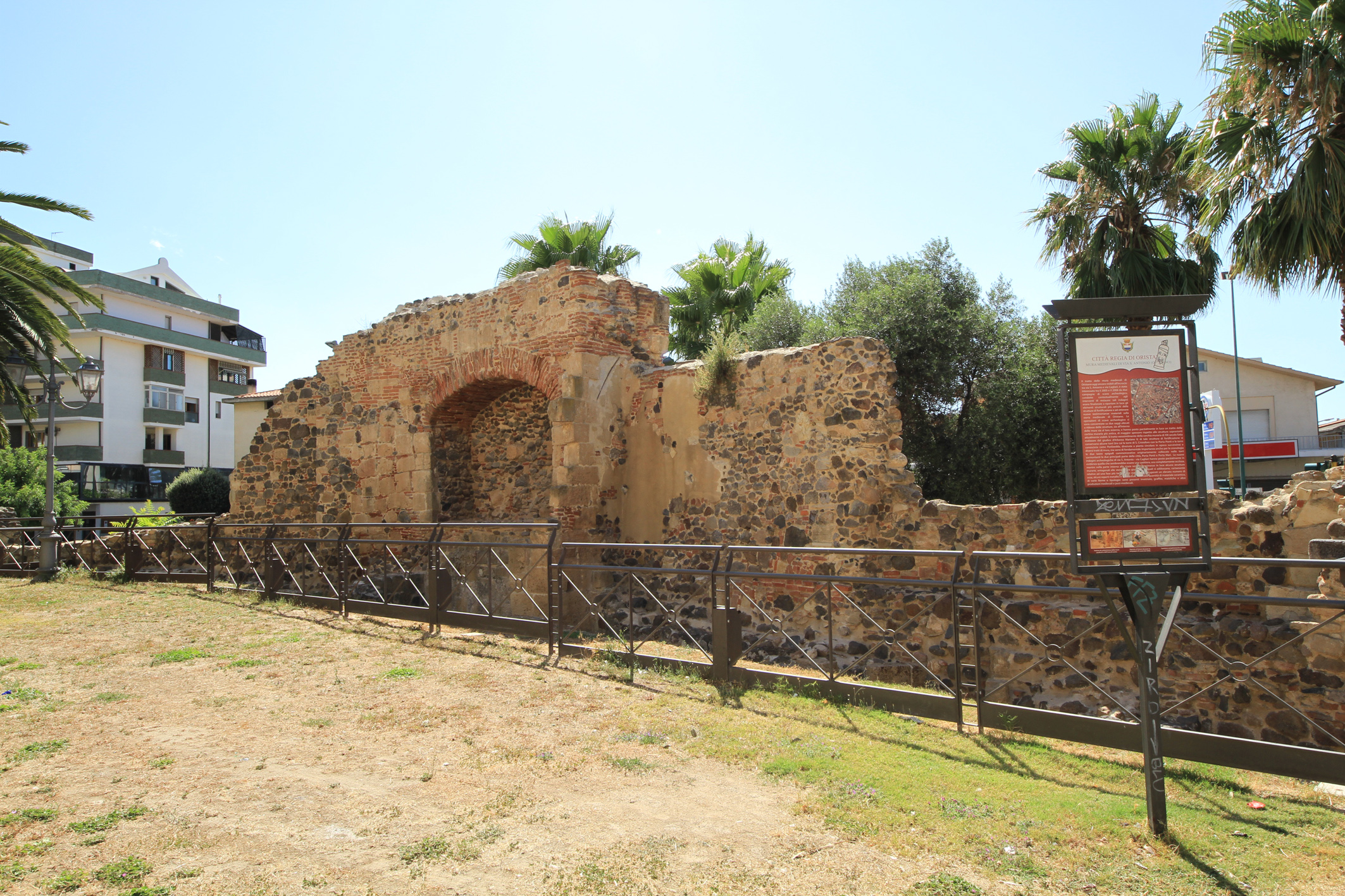
Medieval walls

In medieval times Oristano vied for power over the whole island of Sardinia, and therefore waged wars against the other Sardinian kingdoms which culminated in the attempt to conquer the whole island during the reign (1347–75) of Mariano IV and that of his son Hugh III (1376–1383) and his daughter Eleanor (1383–1404). The Judicate of Arborea held out to be the last Sardinian kingdom to cease to exist in 1420, about 10 years after the battle of Sanluri. It was transformed in Marchesato by the Aragonese and conquered, following a revolt by the last marquess Leonardo Alagon, by the Catalan troops of the Kingdom of Sardinia, in 1478 after the battle of Macomer.

Thereafter, Oristano's history was that of the island of Sardinia, characterised by the Aragonese-Spanish (until 1708) and Piedmontese (from 1720) dominations, and then the unification of Italy. In April 1921, David Cova, Emilio Lussu, Camillo Bellieni and other Sardinian veterans of World War I founded in the city the Sardinian Action Party.

== Climate ==
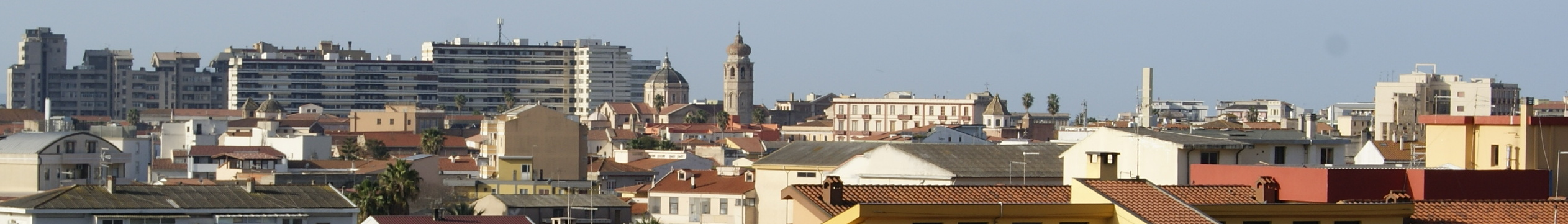
View of the city

Oristano has a subtropical mediterranean climate with hot summers and mild winters. As manifests a mediterranean climate, precipitation patterns are highly seasonally defined, with the vast majority falling during winter. Summers are still retaining warmth and humidity during night in spite of the dry weather.

Climate data for Oristano (1981–2010)
Month	Jan	Feb	Mar	Apr	May	Jun	Jul	Aug	Sep	Oct	Nov	Dec	Year
Mean daily maximum °C (°F)	13.1 (55.6)	14.6 (58.3)	17.3 (63.1)	19.8 (67.6)	25.2 (77.4)	28.8 (83.8)	31.7 (89.1)	32.2 (90.0)	27.9 (82.2)	24.6 (76.3)	18.5 (65.3)	13.8 (56.8)	22.3 (72.1)
Daily mean °C (°F)	9.7 (49.5)	10.6 (51.1)	12.9 (55.2)	15.3 (59.5)	19.8 (67.6)	23.3 (73.9)	26.2 (79.2)	26.9 (80.4)	23.1 (73.6)	20.0 (68.0)	14.7 (58.5)	10.6 (51.1)	17.8 (64.0)
Mean daily minimum °C (°F)	6.3 (43.3)	6.6 (43.9)	8.4 (47.1)	10.7 (51.3)	14.4 (57.9)	17.7 (63.9)	20.6 (69.1)	21.6 (70.9)	18.2 (64.8)	15.3 (59.5)	10.9 (51.6)	7.3 (45.1)	13.2 (55.7)
Average precipitation mm (inches)	51.6 (2.03)	48.1 (1.89)	39.3 (1.55)	56.2 (2.21)	32.3 (1.27)	14.1 (0.56)	2.6 (0.10)	6.5 (0.26)	33.5 (1.32)	62.6 (2.46)	91.1 (3.59)	70.0 (2.76)	507.9 (20)
Source: Sistema nazionale protezione ambiente

== Demographics ==
Historical population
Year	Pop.	±%
1861	8,020	—
1871	8,617	+7.4%
1881	8,892	+3.2%
1901	8,967	+0.8%
1911	10,033	+11.9%
1921	12,119	+20.8%
1931	11,258	−7.1%
1936	12,453	+10.6%
1951	16,298	+30.9%
1961	21,738	+33.4%
1971	26,059	+19.9%
1981	29,424	+12.9%
1991	30,990	+5.3%
2001	31,169	+0.6%
2011	31,155	−0.0%
2021	30,653	−1.6%
Source: ISTAT

As of 2025, Oristano has a population of 30,007, of whom 47.3% are male and 52.7% are female. Minors make up 10.8% of the population, and seniors make up 29.8%, compared to the Italian average of 14.9% and 24.7% respectively.

As of 2024, the foreign-born population is 940, equal to 3.1% of the population. The 5 largest foreign nationalities are Romanians (232), Chinese (137), Senegalese (76), Bangladeshis (47) and Pakistanis (45).

Foreign population by country of birth (2024)
Country	Population
Romania	232
China	137
Senegal	76
Bangladesh	47
Pakistan	45
India	26
Spain	26
Nigeria	24
Ukraine	22
Poland	21
Brazil	16
Bulgaria	15
Morocco	15
Bosnia and Herzegovina	14
Russia	13

== Culture ==
=== Sa Sartiglia and other events ===
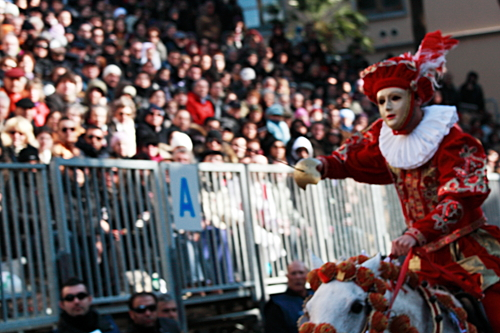
Sartiglia

Sa Sartiglia, otherwise known at its inception as Sartilla, is an equestrian tournament held in Oristano for the past 500 years on Carnival Sunday and Mardi Gras. The tournament on Sunday is organized by the corporation (gremio) of farmers, whereas that on Mardi Gras is organised by the gremio of carpenters. It has arguably an ancient Castilian origin. Researchers M. Falchi and M. Zucca found a manuscript dating the first tournament to 1543, whereas Pau, a late local historian, believed it originated in Oristano before the Spaniards set foot on the island. In fact, in a letter written to an English friar in the 14th century, St. Catherine of Siena stated that the Judge of Arborea could provide two galleys and one thousand horsemen to fight in a crusade for ten years. While being far from conclusive evidence that the tournament had already been, or was about to be held, this letter is certainly a testament to the importance of horse-breeding in Oristano and its surrounding countryside at the time.

The name "Sartiglia" comes from Sortija which, in turn, evolved from the Latin word Sorticola, the diminutive form of Sors which does not only mean fate and fortune, but also "ring".

The ring is a tin star provided with a hole at its centre, hanging from a ribbon strung above horseman's height across the street near the cathedral, at which masked horsemen aim with their swords on steeds galloping at breath-taking speed, after being announced by trumpets and drums and having gathered pace down a route, covered with sand, snaking across the town centre. The number of stars caught on each day is a sign of the wealth that the harvest and carpentry work will bring to the corporations.

At the end of Sa Sartiglia, elsewhere within the old walls, another sand covered route will be trodden by horses ridden by those same masked horsemen and women showing their prowess, while engaging in acrobatics on two and three galloping steeds at a time. This is called La Pariglia, and ends at sunset.

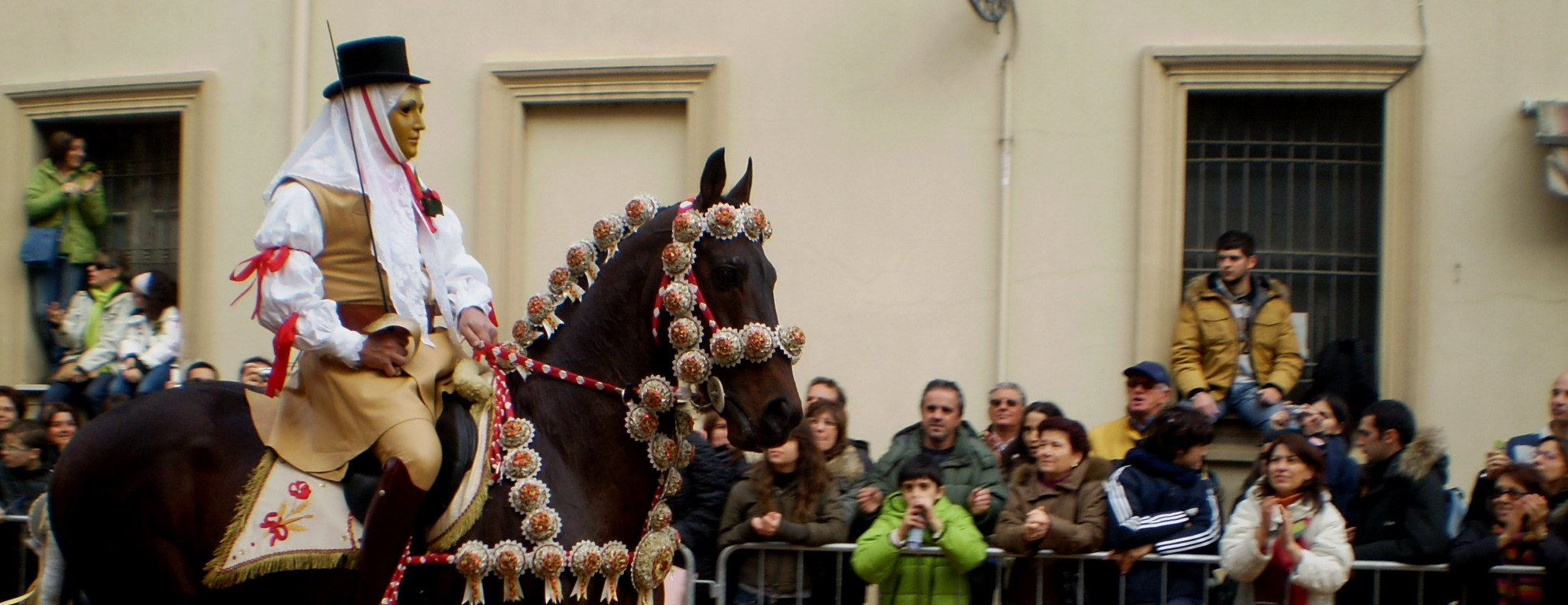
Su Componidori

The leader of both trials is called Su Componidori, meaning "the one who marshals". He is chosen by the members of the Corporations, who do not disclose his name until Candlemas, when Su Majorale announces it directly to the appointee and a careful selection of the horses as well as adequate practice can start. He is neither a man, nor a woman but androgynous, much akin to the land and, at the end of the tournament, blesses bystanders and the town with the "little doll of May" (Sa Pippia 'e maiu), a bunch of flowers swaddled in a ribbon, believed to pre-date the tournament itself, followed by the other horsemen at a canter first, and then alone, riding with his back on his galloping steed's, face up gazing at the Heavens.

== Main sights ==
Map of city center

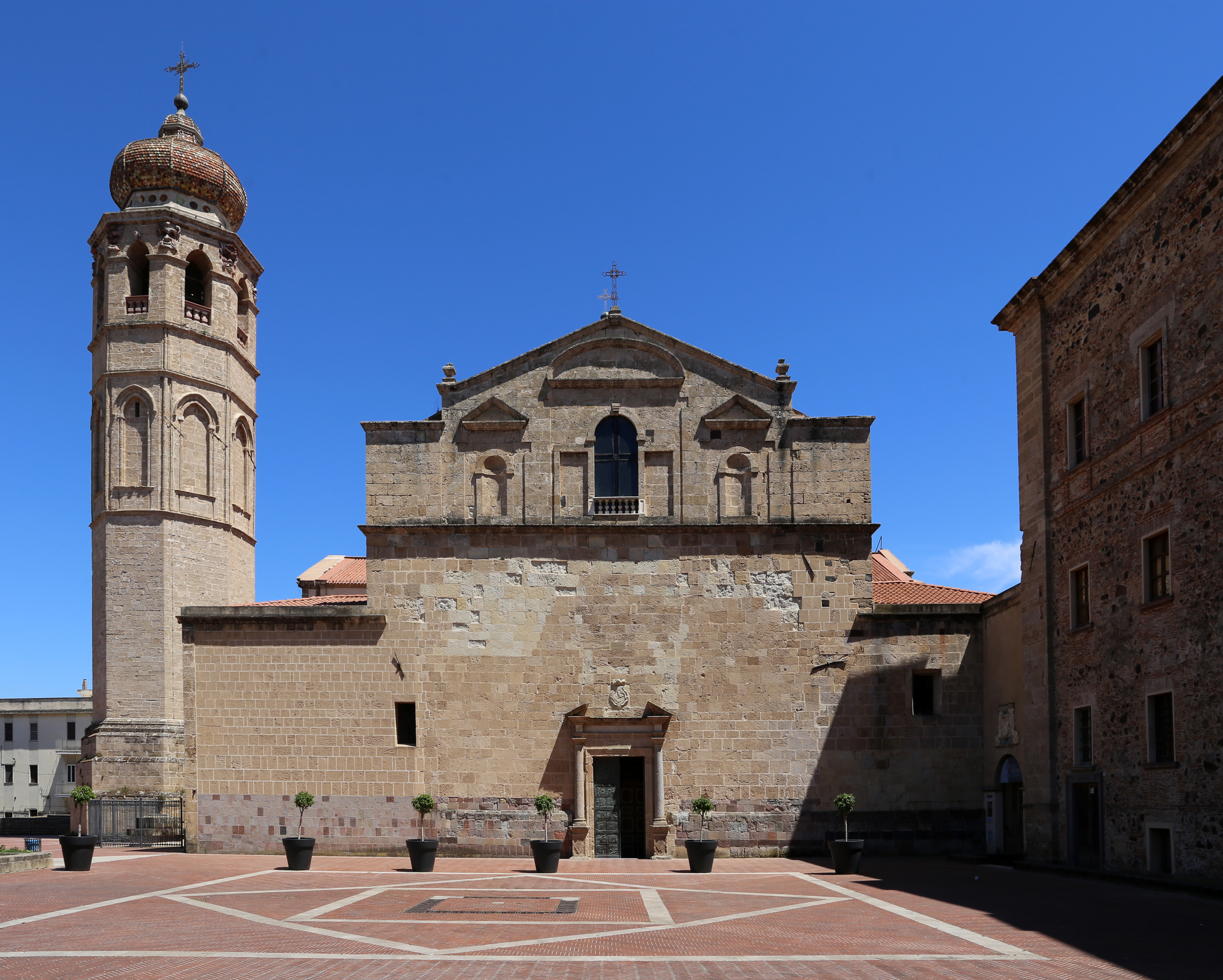
Oristano Cathedral

- The Tower of St. Christophoros, otherwise known as Tower of Mariano II, was built in 1290, is 19 metres (62 ft) tall and the most striking remaining evidence of the old walls built at the time of the Judicate, as it was one of the main gates thereof.
- Torrione ("Big Tower") of Portixedda.
- St. Mary's Cathedral (1130) was rebuilt during the reign of Mariano II after being destroyed in a siege. Of the original structure of Mariano, only parts of the apse and base of the campanile are left, as well as the Gothic Chapel of the Rimedio, which houses some medieval sculptures. Parts of a more ancient Byzantine edifice can be seen in the court. To the 17th century renovation belongs the Chapel of the Archivietto ("Chapel of the Small Archive"). The current Baroque style is largely from the 19th-century restoration. It has been supposed that the cathedral was used for the burials of the Judges and their families, but the subsequent dominations have deleted all traces of them. In the interior is a wooden statue of the Annunziata, attributed to Nino Pisano.
- The Church of St. Francis of Assisi was built around 1200 and is currently in neo-classical style. Therewithin is the Christ of Nicodemus, a wooden sculpture believed to be the work of Valencian masters, dating back to the 14th century.
- The Franciscan church of Santa Chiara (consecrated in 1428) is an edifice in French-Gothic style with a single nave and a square apse.
- The Church and cloister of the Carmine is one of the best examples of Baroque-Roccoco architecture in Oristano.
- The Church of Saint Sebastian is the only medieval extramural church, i.e. it is located outside the walls.
- The Church of Saint Dominic (San Domenico) was built in 1634 at the initiative of friar Pietro Flores and financially supported by local nobleman Baldassarre Dedoni. Citizens also made donations in exchange for 2 square metres (22 ft^{2}) of floor space for a tomb therewithin. The building is a rectangularly shaped chamber with two chapels formed in its right side wall: one of them is dedicated to Saint Vincent and the other one to the name of Jesus. Most notably, it has a wood retable that served as the main altar and includes several niches dedicated to Saint Dominic and other Saints. Upon the suppression of religious orders in 1832 the Dominicans, who had been in charge until then, bequeathed the church to the archconfraternity of the Saint Name of Jesus. It was thereafter refurbished several times, deconsecrated and currently serves as an Auditorium for congresses and concerts.
- In the village of Massama is the small pre-Romanesque church called Oratory of the Souls, showing influences from the Visigothic art of the 8th century.

== Transport ==
Oristano can be reached by train from Sardinia's ports of Olbia and Porto Torres, and the island's main cities Cagliari and Sassari. From Oristano all villages of the province can be reached by buses departing the bus station close to centrally located Piazza G.Manno. Moreover, a private concern provides a twice-daily bus service to and from Cagliari Elmas Airport. The journey takes approximately 2 hours.

Oristano is served by the Fenosu Airport, 3 km (2 mi) from the city, and by a cargo sea port. The airport is no longer operating.

== Twin towns – sister cities ==
Oristano is twinned with:

- Ciutadella de Menorca, Spain, since 1991
- Garden City, Kansas, United States

== See also ==
- Arborea
- Roman Catholic Archdiocese of Oristano
