= Civic Archaeological Museum of the Menhir Statues =

Coordinates: 39°51′16″N 9°03′08″E

Menhir Museum - Civic Archaeological Museum of the Menhir Statues
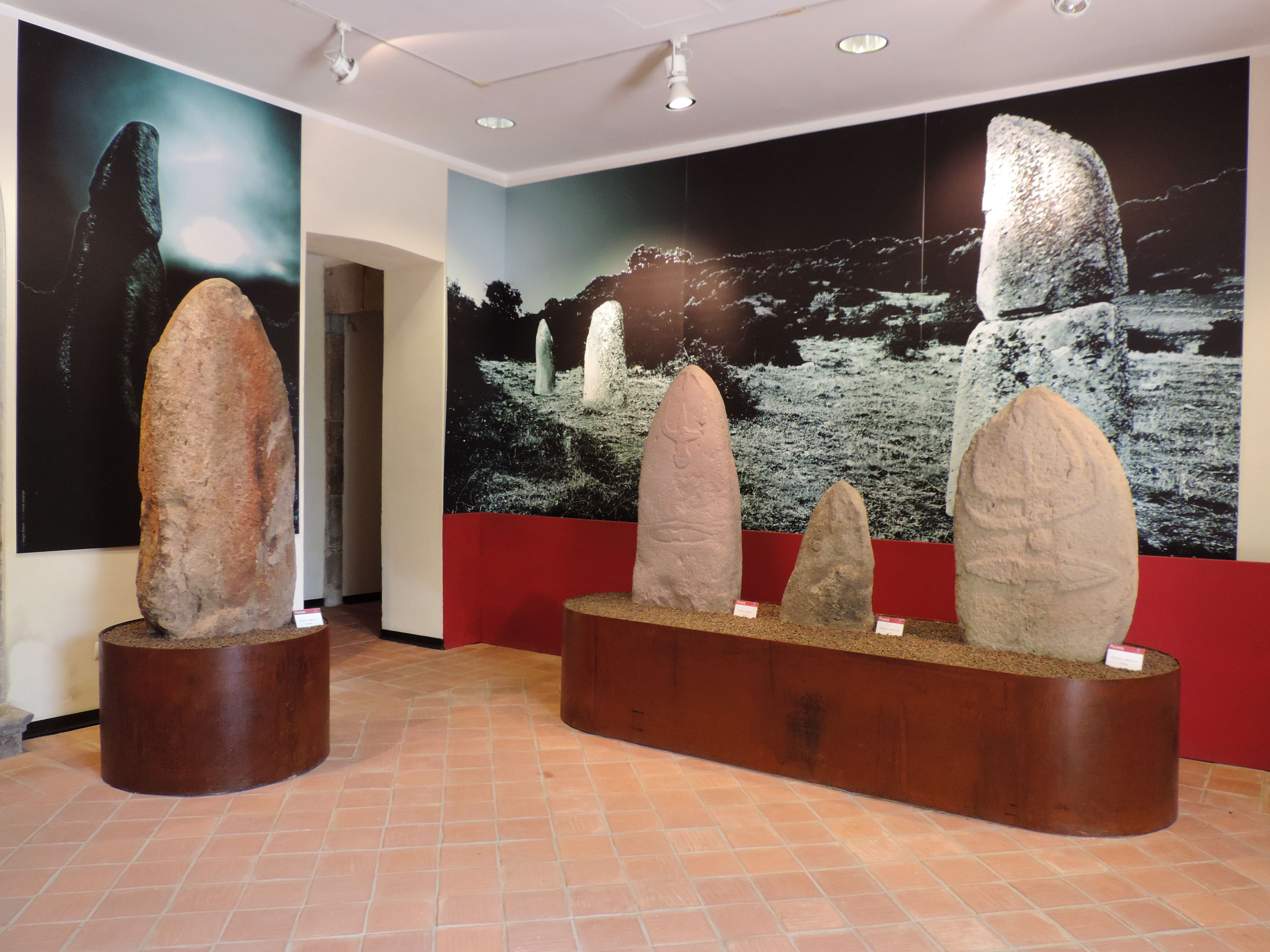
- Established: 2010
- Location: Laconi, Sardinia, Italy
- Type: Archaeological museum
- Director: Giorgio Murru
- Website: https://www.menhirmuseum.it/

The Menhir Museum, or Civic Archaeological Museum of the Menhir Statues, located in the Aymerich Palace in the village of Laconi, is a unique museum of its kind for its rich collection of steles found in the Laconi area, with the first discovery in 1969.

== History of the Aymerich Palace ==
The Aymerichs, who arrived in Sardinia in 1323 following the prince Alfonso of Aragon to occupy the island, played a leading role in local history, both in modern and contemporary times, often determining the ups and downs that animated this territory for 500 years. .

Inaugurated in 1846 as a rural residence of the Marquises of Laconi, the Palace is a splendid example of neoclassical style, the result of the nineteenth-century project of Gaetano Cima, architect from Cagliari who was responsible for the construction of the main part, the facade of the building and the Palatine chapel. The main body of the building, spread over 3 floors, is characterized by the main facade, in typical neoclassical style, punctuated by windows and elegant balconies.

Inside, on the "noble floor" intended from its origins as a representative area, precious wallpapers from that age, created by the prestigious French printing house Maison Dufour, are still visible.

The total area of the building is over 5,000 square meters, functional to the carrying out of all the conservation and processing activities of foodstuffs from the many agricultural possessions and farms in the area.

== History of the museum ==
In 1969, Professor Enrico Atzeni discovered the first Sardinian Menhir Statue (Genna Arrele I). From that moment there was a long succession of exceptional finds.

The museum institution, inaugurated in November 1996 inside the nineteenth-century Municipal Palace, gave space to the exhibition of 40 Menhir statues from the Laconi countryside.

After the purchase of the Aymerich Palace by the Municipality of Laconi and its subsequent restoration, in 2010 the new museum was inaugurated, with a new exposition including statues from the territories of Villa Sant'Antonio, Allai and Samugheo in addition to the Menhir Statues from Laconi.

== Museum exhibition ==
The exhibition is divided into three levels and eleven rooms inside the Aymerich Palace. On the ground floor, beyond the ticket office and the bookshop, we find a first exhibition of Menhirs Statues, the reproduction of a quarry for the creation of the Statues and the recently restored Noble Chapel of the Aymerich family. The visit continues through the external courtyards of the residence and then in the rooms on the second floor, where we find the remaining Menhir statues of the territory and a collection of important artifacts, part of the funerary equipment of some Neolithic and early metal age burials related to the same context of discovery of the Menhir Statues.

On the first floor, called the noble floor, we can admire the nineteenth-century wallpapers of the Joseph Dufour manufacture. The remaining rooms on this level are currently home to interesting temporary exhibitions.

- Laconi's Menhirs: The discovery of Laconi's Menhir Statues began in 1969, when the first Menhir Statue was found in Genna Arréle, "laying isolated on the edge to the right of the agrarian penetration road, on the edge of an uncultivated land." (Enrico Atzeni, 1973) From that moment it is a succession of exceptional finds. Locations such as Genna Arréle, Perda Iddocca, Barrili, Palas De Nuraxi, Piscina 'e Sali, Bau Carradore, Nuraxi Orrùbiu, are now part of the sumptuous archaeological literature about it. The new museum exhibition currently includes 44 menhir statues, coming from different parts of the town.
- The noble chapel: The chapel of Aymerich Palace is one of the few noble chapels of Neoclassical style left in Sardinia that has miraculously preserved its spirit unchanged. Inside it shows an octagonal plan: a small, rather intimate space, marked by fluted stucco and painted columns, divided in height by a string course with strong overhanging ovoli; a space certainly suited to its function as a place of prayer and religious rites harmoniously divided and differentiated, where each element contributes to creating an atmosphere of elegant meditation. The wooden altar, now orphan of the three statues owned by the family that decorated it, is preserved in a good condition.
- The showcases: The finds kept in the showcases come from some funerary sites in the Laconi area, in particular from the necropolis of Pranu 'e Arranas, from the Dolmen of Corte Noa and from the circle tomb of Masone 'e Perdu, spanning a period of time from the early metal age to the archaic phases of the ancient Bronze Age (an era between 2700 and 1800 BC). The exhibits on display include many different periods and touch various cultures, from the Abealzu-Filigosa and Bonnannaro ones to the Bell Beaker one.
- The menhirs of the territory: The three Statues of Allai belong to a more conspicuous group of Menhir Statues coming from Pranu Orisa. The Allai specimens show three different types of shape. In Samugheo, in the two localities of Paule Lutùrru and Cuccuru De Lai, the steles were found in fragments and in secondary context in a dry stone wall near the remains of a nuragic Giants' grave and the homonymous single tower nuraghe. In addition, a hundred fragments of iconic and aniconic anthropomorphic statues, obtained from local ignimbrite were found, reused on site in a dry stone wall.
- The noble floor: The first level of the building is occupied by the noble floor. Two rooms are embellished by the sumptuous nineteenth-century wallpapers from the Joseph Dufour manufacture, “Greek and Olympic Games Festival” and “Paris Monuments”.

== Bibliography ==
- E. ANATI, I pugnali nell'arte rupestre e nelle statue-stele dell'Italia settentrionale, Ed.del Centro, Archivi 4. 1972
- E. ATZENI, Laconi, Statua-menhir di Genna ‘e Arrele, in Nuovi idoli della Sardegna prenuragica, Studi Sardi, Gallizzi, Sassari, 1975. pp. 24-32, figg. 3-4, tavv. XIII-XVII.
- E. ATZENI, Le statue-menhir di Laconi, in Sardegna Centro-Orientale: dal Neolitico alla fine del mondo antico, Dessi, Sassari1978, pp. 47-52; tavv. X-XIV.
- E. ATZENI, Le statue-menhir del Sarcidano, in Aspetti e sviluppi culturali del neolitico e della prima Età dei metalli in Sardegna, Ichnussa, La Sardegna dalle origini all’età classica, Scheiwiller, Milan 1981, pp. 47-51; tavv. 136-141.
- E. ATZENI, Menhirs antropomorfi e statue-menhirs della Sardegna, in Annali del Museo Civico della Spezia, vol. II, 1979-80, Tip. Moderna, La Spezia 1981, pp. 9-64; figg. 1-8; tavv. I-XIX.
- E. ATZENI, Megalitismo e Arte, in L’età del Rame in Sardegna, Atti del Congresso Internazionale L’Età del Rame in Europa, Viareggio 1987, pp. 442-456, figg. 4-6.
- E. ATZENI, Statue-menhir di Laconi (Nuoro), in L’Età del Rame, cit., pp. 524-25. 70 E. ATZENI, Tombe megalitiche di Laconi (Nuoro), in L’Età del Rame, cit., pp. 526-27.
- E. ATZENI, Villa S. Antonio – Stazioni di Genna Carruba e Genna Sorti. Menhir di Corru Tundu e Carabassa. Senis. Statue-menhir di Bidda ‘e Perda. Allai – Statue-menhir di Planu Ollisa, in Reperti neolitici dall’Oristanese, Sardina antiqua, Ed. della Torre, Cagliari 1992, pp. 49-62, tavv. VIII-IX.
- E. ATZENI, La statuaria antropomorfa sarda, in La statuaria antropomorfa in Europa dal neolitico alla romanizzazione, Atti del Congresso Internazionale, La Spezia-Pontremoli 1988, La Spezia 1994, pp. 193-213; figg. 1-3; Tavv. I-VII.
- E. ATZENI, Museo delle statue-menhir di Laconi, in Guida alla visita dei Musei e delle Collezioni della Sardegna, Regione Autonoma della Sardegna, Ass. della Pubblica Istruzione, Casteddu 1977, pp. 154-156; figg. 1-3. E. ATZENI, Statue-menhir in Sardegna, in Archeologia Viva, Florence 1997 n. 62, p. 15.
- E. CONTU, Nuovi petroglifi schematici della Sardegna, Bull. Paletn. It., 1965, p. 69. A.M. COSSU, Nuove statue-menhirs ed un inedito petroglifo nel territorio di Allai (Oristano), in Studi Sardi, XXX, Sassari 1996, pp. 299-328.
- G. LILLIU, La civiltà preistorica e nuragica in Sardegna, in Atti della Accademia Nazionale dei Lincei, Memorie, serie IX, vol. XV, fasc. 3, Rome 2002, pp. 221-264; Tav. I-XCII.
- A. MORAVETTI, Statue-menhir in una tomba di giganti del Marghine, in Nuovo Bull. Arch. Sardo, Sassari 1984, pp. 41-67.
- G. MURRU, Le statue menhir di Laconi, analisi dei simboli, in L'eredità del Sarcidano e della Barbagia di Seulo, Blackwood & Partners, 1998
- M. PERRA, Statue-menhirs in territorio di Samugheo (Oristano), in Nuovo Bull. Arch. Sardo, 4, Sassari 1994, pp. 17-42; figg. 1-14.
