= Sacred pit of Garlo =

Archaeological site in Bulgaria

Coordinates: 42.787°N 22.848°E

The Sacred pit of Garlo is an archaeological site near the village of Garlo in Pernik District, Bulgaria.

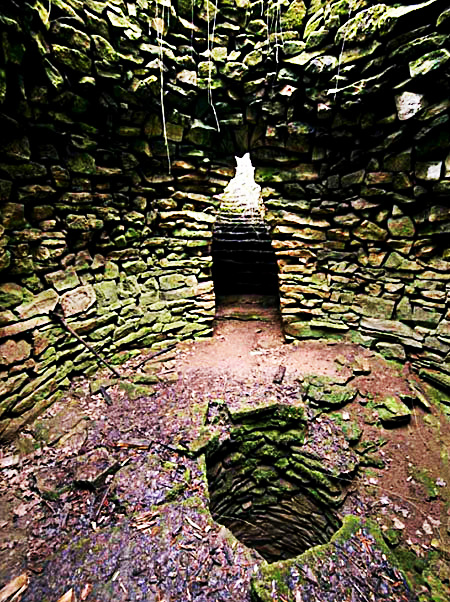
The interior of the Sacred Nuragi Pit, Garlo Village, Bulgaria

== Description and cultural context ==
The site was excavated in 1972 by Professor Dr. Dimitrina Dzhonova and her team. Professor Mitova-Dzhonova dates the pit to around the 11th century BC and relates the site to the sacred pits found within the remains of the Nuragic civilization in Sardinia. Outside Sardinia such sites have been found on the Crimean Peninsula (Ukraine) and in Palestine.

The sacred pit was constructed in a little valley lined with many springs in prehistoric times. The southern part of the pit is dug into the ground. A 7-metre (23 ft) corridor (δρόμος) with thirteen stone steps leads into a round domed room (θολός) at the center of which, over the source, is a well 5 metres (16 ft) deep.

The sacred pit is a sophisticated device, established entirely underground. The long axis of the well is oriented north–south but it was constructed on the eastern slope of a hill, now above a small water reservoir built in the 1960s. The entrance to the underground chamber is on the east side and consists of a flight of 24 steps 1.1 metres (3 ft 7 in) wide. The first nine steps are in the open air, the next 15 are underground.

The steps lead to an underground vaulted round circular chamber 4.2 metres (14 ft) in diameter. On the top of the vault a circular hole to the sky, 2.3 metres (7 ft 7 in) wide. The underground staircase joins the vaulted chamber by an arched gate 2.4 metres (7 ft 10 in) high. The construction is 'almost identical' to the Funtana Coberta at Ballao in Sardinia.

Directly above the temple, an ancient sanctuary of the sun was organised. Today the rock massif and the terrain of the sanctuary are covered by young forest. According to the memories of local residents, signs are carved in the surrounding rocks, and there is a small stone basin near the temple well. That information, although acquired from residents of the village of Garlo, deserve particular attention because monuments are identified with certain elements of the Nuraghe culture and formed the cult of the Moon and the complementary nature of the sacred pit.

How the sacred megalithic facility and the entire religious complex in the village of Garlo was built remains an open question for modern historians and archaeologists. Immigrants from the Nuraghe culture may have wished to have a religious facility in their new place of settlement or local residents may have led builders to build them such a facility for some reason.

During field studies conducted in the 1970s, Professor Mitova-Dzhonova's team have found archeological sites that might belong to similar sanctuaries in the villages of Berayintsi, Rebro, Dolna Melna, Paramun and Dolni Romantzi (Pernik District, Bulgaria).

== Purpose ==
According to Mitova-Dzhonova, ancient deities of water, or more precisely of underworld water resources, were worshipped in the sacred pit at Garlo.

== See also ==
- Nuragic holy well
- Nuragic civilization
