= Usellus =

Usellus Usèddus
- Comune
- Comune di Usellus
- Coat of arms

- Location within Sardinia
- Coordinates: 39°48′N 8°51′E
- Country: Italy
- Region: Sardinia
- Province: Oristano (OR)
- Frazioni: Escovedu

Government
  - Mayor: Lucio Melis

Area
  - Total: 35.10 km^{2} (13.55 sq mi)
- Elevation: 289 m (948 ft)

Population (31 December 2016)
  - Total: 773
  - Density: 22.0/km^{2} (57.0/sq mi)
- Demonym(s): Usellesi; Useddesus
- Time zone: UTC+1 (CET)
  - Summer (DST): UTC+2 (CEST)
- Postal code: 09090
- Dialing code: 0783
- Website: Official website

Usellus (Sardinian: Usèddus; Latin: Uselis or Usellis) is a town, comune (municipality) and former bishopric in the Province of Oristano in the Italian region Sardinia.

Usellus borders the following comuni: Albagiara, Ales, Gonnosnò, Mogorella, Villa Verde, Villaurbana.

== History ==
Usellus is in the interior of Sardinia, about 25 kilometres (16 mi) from the Gulf of Oristano on the west coast, and the same distance south of Forum Trajani (modern Fordongianus). Its name is not found in the Itineraries, and the only ancient author who mentions it is Ptolemy, with the name Οὔσελλις, who erroneously places it on the west coast of the island: but the existing ruins, together with the continuity of the name, leave no doubt of its true situation. It is about 5 km (3.1 mi) northeast of the modern town of Ales.

Ptolemy styles it a colonia, and this is confirmed by an inscription on a bronze tablet of AD 158 (a tabula patronatus, setting forth that M. Aristius Balbinus had accepted the position of patron of the town for himself and his heirs) that speaks of the place as Colonia Julia Augusta Uselis. It would hence appear probable that the colony must have been founded under Augustus, though Pliny asserts that Turris Libisonis (modern Porto Torres) was the only colony in Sardinia at his time (79 CE, hence after Augustus' reign) It may be that civic rights were obtained from Augustus.

== Main sights ==
- The ruins of the church of Santa Reparata have been conserved. It marks the site of the ancient town, and various antiquities have been found there.

== See also ==
- Diocese of Ales-Terralba
