= Paulilatino =

Paulilatino Paulle
- Comune
- Comune di Paulilatino
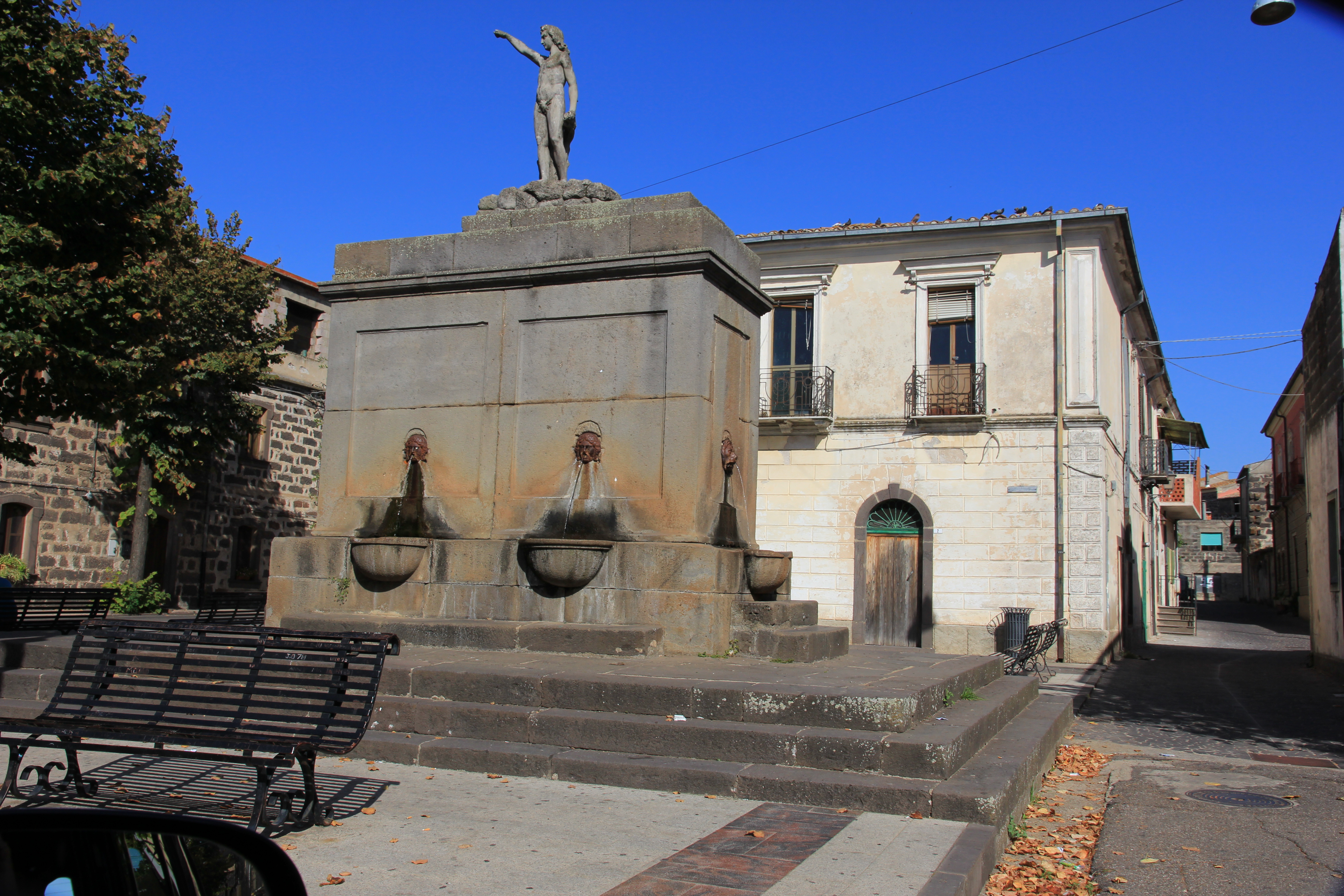

- Location within Sardinia
- Coordinates: 40°5′N 8°46′E
- Country: Italy
- Region: Sardinia
- Province: Oristano (OR)

Government
  - Mayor: Domenico Gallus

Area
  - Total: 103.85 km^{2} (40.10 sq mi)
- Elevation: 280 m (920 ft)

Population (31 December 2016)
  - Total: 2,229
  - Density: 21.46/km^{2} (55.59/sq mi)
- Demonym: Paulesi
- Time zone: UTC+1 (CET)
  - Summer (DST): UTC+2 (CEST)
- Postal code: 09070
- Dialing code: 0758
- Website: Official website

Paulilatino (Sardinian: Paùlle) is a comune (municipality) in the Province of Oristano in the Italian region Sardinia, located about 100 kilometres (62 mi) northwest of Cagliari and about 25 kilometres (16 mi) northeast of Oristano.

Paulilatino borders the following municipalities: Abbasanta, Bauladu, Bonarcado, Fordongianus, Ghilarza, Santu Lussurgiu, Solarussa, Villanova Truschedu, Zerfaliu.

== Main sights ==
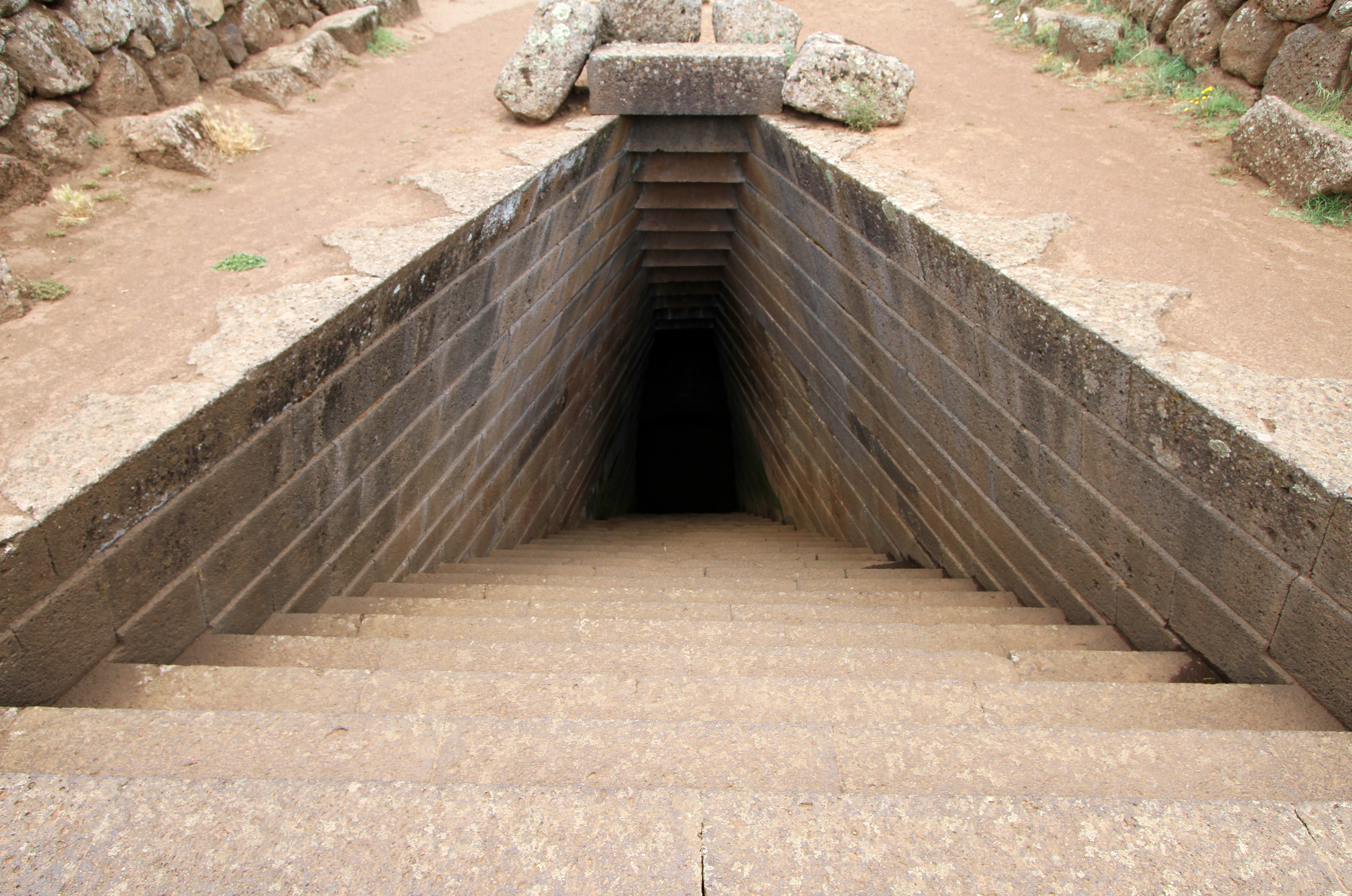
Santa Cristina Nuragic holy well

The archaeological complex of Santa Cristina dates from the 12 century BC and consists of a well and various ceremonial buildings. It is one of the most important sites of the Nuragic civilization. Central to the facilities is a well, built with well smoothed basaltic ashlars and consisting of three architectural elements: an elliptical enclosure, stairs shaped like a trapezium and a circular chamber with an ogival ceiling that contains the water. In front of the well there are remains of Nuragic villager huts with and a gathering place.

Other sights include numerous nuraghe and domus de janas, and the Aragonese-Gothic-style church of San Teodoro.
