= Assolo =

Assolo Assolu
- Comune
- Comune di Assolo
- Location within Sardinia
- Coordinates: 39°49′N 8°55′E
- Country: Italy
- Region: Sardinia
- Province: Province of Oristano

Government
  - Mayor: Giuseppe Minnei

Area
  - Total: 16.37 km^{2} (6.32 sq mi)
- Elevation: 255 m (837 ft)

Population (2026)
  - Total: 321
  - Density: 19.6/km^{2} (50.8/sq mi)
- Demonyms: Assolesi; Assolesus
- Time zone: UTC+1 (CET)
  - Summer (DST): UTC+2 (CEST)
- Postal code: 09080
- Dialing code: 0783

Assolo (Sardinian: Assolu) is a village and comune (municipality) in the Province of Oristano in the autonomous island region of Sardinia in Italy, located about 70 kilometres (43 mi) north of Cagliari and about 30 kilometres (19 mi) southeast of Oristano. It has 321 inhabitants.

Assolo borders the municipalities of Albagiara, Genoni, Nureci, Senis, and Villa Sant'Antonio.

== Demographics ==
As of 2026, the population is 321, of which 52.3% are male, and 47.7% are female. Minors make up 10% of the population, and seniors make up 35.8%.

Historical population

| Year | Pop. | ±% |
|---|---|---|
| 1861 | 675 | — |
| 1871 | 653 | −3.3% |
| 1881 | 694 | +6.3% |
| 1901 | 608 | −12.4% |
| 1911 | 599 | −1.5% |
| 1921 | 633 | +5.7% |
| 1931 | 678 | +7.1% |
| 1936 | 697 | +2.8% |

| Year | Pop. | ±% |
|---|---|---|
| 1951 | 718 | +3.0% |
| 1961 | 743 | +3.5% |
| 1971 | 730 | −1.7% |
| 1981 | 608 | −16.7% |
| 1991 | 544 | −10.5% |
| 2001 | 485 | −10.8% |
| 2011 | 434 | −10.5% |
| 2021 | 348 | −19.8% |

Source: ISTAT

=== Immigration ===
As of 2025, of the known countries of birth of 325 residents, the most numerous are: Italy (318 – 97.8%), Romania (3 – 0.9%), Germany (3 – 0.9%) an.
