= Asuni =

Asuni Asùni
- Comune
- Comune di Asuni
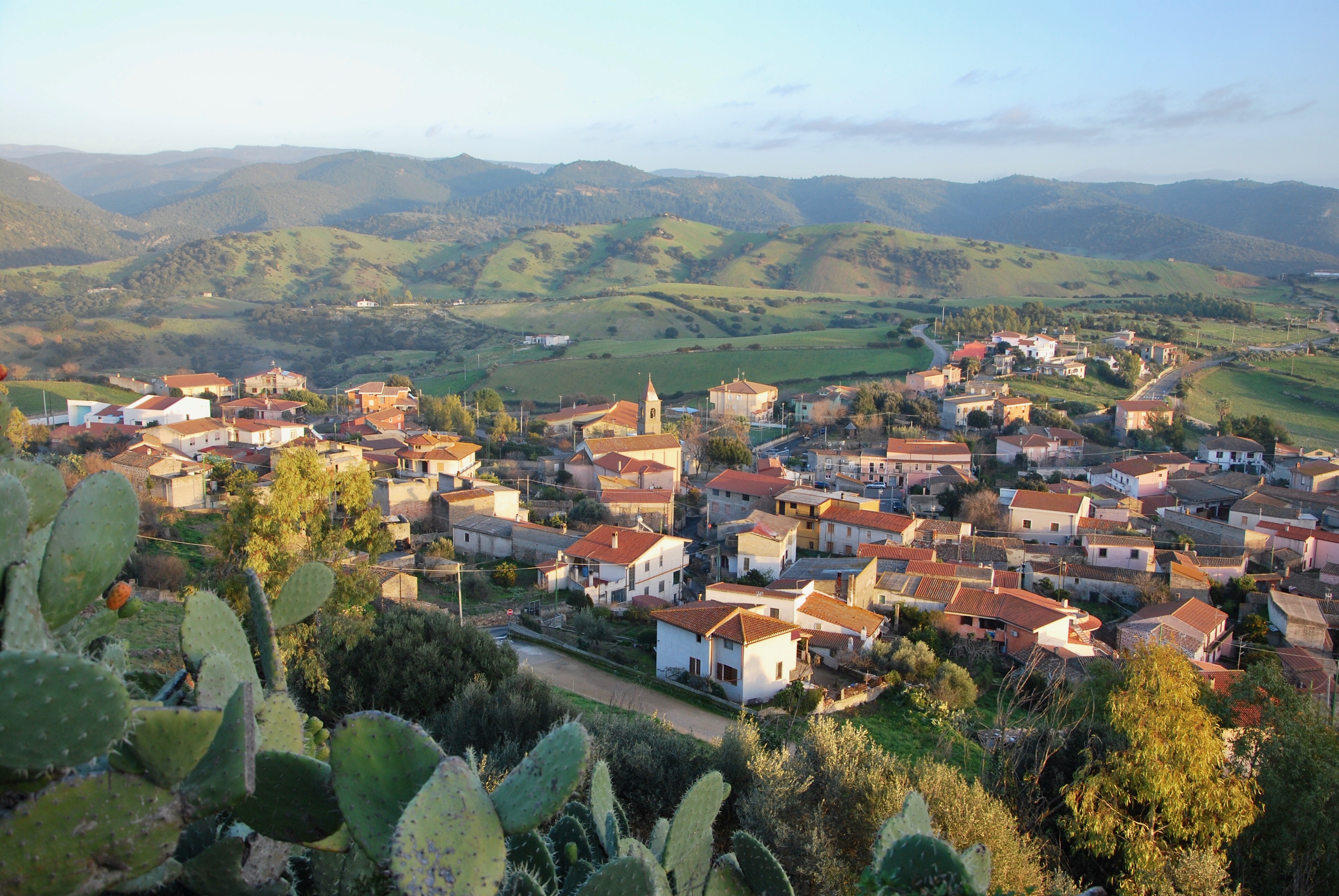
- View of Asuni

- Location of Asuni in Sardinia
- Coordinates: 39°52′N 8°57′E
- Country: Italy
- Region: Sardinia
- Province: Province of Oristano

Government
  - Mayor: Gionata Petza

Area
  - Total: 21.34 km^{2} (8.24 sq mi)

Population (2026)
  - Total: 295
  - Density: 13.8/km^{2} (35.8/sq mi)
- Demonyms: Asunesi; Asunesus
- Time zone: UTC+1 (CET)
  - Summer (DST): UTC+2 (CEST)
- Postal code: 09080
- Dialing code: 0783

Asuni (Sardinian: Asùni) is a village and comune (municipality) in the Province of Oristano in the autonomous island region of Sardinia in Italy, located about 70 kilometres (43 mi) north of Cagliari and about 30 kilometres (19 mi) east of Oristano. It has 295 inhabitants.

Asuni borders the municipalities of Laconi, Ruinas, Samugheo, Senis, and Villa Sant'Antonio.

== Demographics ==
As of 2026, the population is 295, of which 50.2% are male, and 49.8% are female. Minors make up 10.8% of the population, and seniors make up 35.9%.

Historical population

Year	Pop.	±%
1861	603	—
1871	632	+4.8%
1881	540	−14.6%
1901	629	+16.5%
1911	522	−17.0%
1921	552	+5.7%
1931	601	+8.9%
1936	605	+0.7%

Year	Pop.	±%
1951	691	+14.2%
1961	764	+10.6%
1971	738	−3.4%
1981	608	−17.6%
1991	517	−15.0%
2001	425	−17.8%
2011	357	−16.0%
2021	311	−12.9%

Source: ISTAT

=== Immigration ===
As of 2025, of the known countries of birth of 293 residents, the most numerous are: Italy (290 – 99%), Ecuador (2 – 0.7%) an.
