= Zerfaliu =

Zerfaliu Zrofollìu
- Comune
- Comune di Zerfaliu
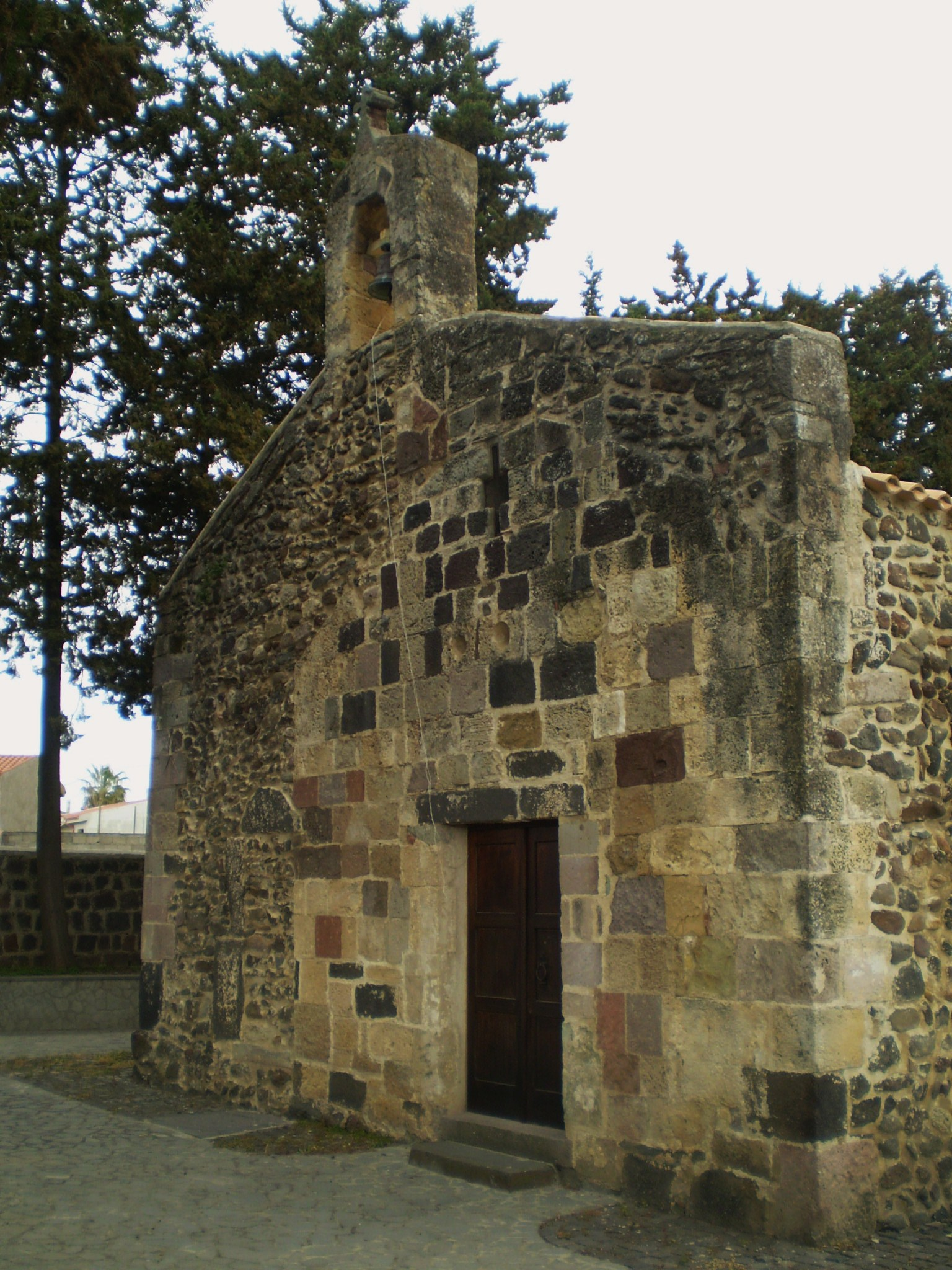
- The Church of Saint John, Zerfaliu

- Location within Sardinia
- Coordinates: 39°58′N 8°43′E
- Country: Italy
- Region: Sardinia
- Province: Province of Oristano (OR)

Government
  - Mayor: Pinuccio Lino Chelo

Area
  - Total: 15.56 km^{2} (6.01 sq mi)
- Elevation: 15 m (49 ft)

Population (31 December 2016)
  - Total: 1,092
  - Density: 70.18/km^{2} (181.8/sq mi)
- Demonym: Zerfaliesi
- Time zone: UTC+1 (CET)
  - Summer (DST): UTC+2 (CEST)
- Postal code: 09070
- Dialing code: 0783
- Website: Official website

Zerfaliu (Zrofollìu in the Sardinian language) is a comune (municipality) in the Province of Oristano in the Italian region of Sardinia, located about 90 kilometres (56 mi) northwest of Cagliari and about 14 kilometres (9 mi) northeast of Oristano.

Zerfaliu borders the following municipalities: Ollastra, Paulilatino, Simaxis, Solarussa, Villanova Truschedu.
