= Palmas Arborea =

Palmas Arborea Prammas
- Comune
- Comune di Palmas Arborea
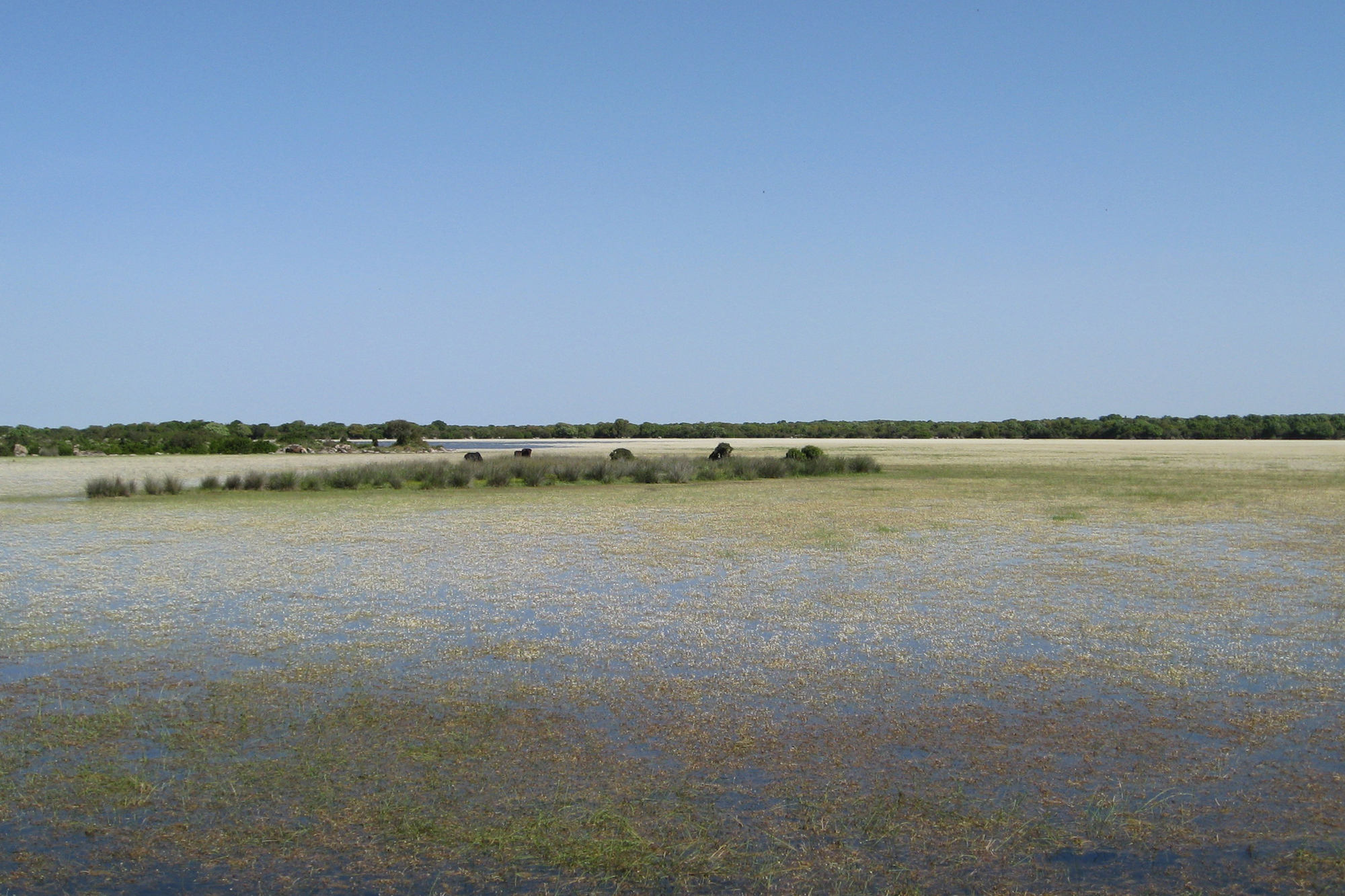
- Pauli Majori

- Location within Sardinia
- Coordinates: 39°53′N 8°39′E
- Country: Italy
- Region: Sardinia
- Province: Province of Oristano (OR)

Area
  - Total: 39.3 km^{2} (15.2 sq mi)

Population (Dec. 2004)
  - Total: 1,366
  - Density: 34.8/km^{2} (90.0/sq mi)
- Time zone: UTC+1 (CET)
  - Summer (DST): UTC+2 (CEST)
- Postal code: 09090
- Dialing code: 0783

Palmas Arborea (Sardinian: Prammas) is a comune (municipality) in the Province of Oristano in the Italian region Sardinia, located about 80 kilometres (50 mi) northwest of Cagliari and about 6 kilometres (4 mi) southeast of Oristano. As of 31 December 2004, it had a population of 1,366 and an area of 39.3 square kilometres (15.2 mi^{2}).

Palmas Arborea borders the following municipalities: Ales, Oristano, Pau, Santa Giusta, Villa Verde, Villaurbana.

== Demographic evolution ==
Historical population

Year	Pop.	±%
1861	379	—
1871	493	+30.1%
1881	487	−1.2%
1901	481	−1.2%
1911	446	−7.3%

Year	Pop.	±%
1921	457	+2.5%
1931	531	+16.2%
1936	542	+2.1%
1951	674	+24.4%
1961	907	+34.6%

Year	Pop.	±%
1971	912	+0.6%
1981	1,093	+19.8%
1991	1,240	+13.4%
2001	1,335	+7.7%

Source: Data from ISTAT
