= Siapiccia =

Siapiccia Siapicia
- Comune
- Comune di Siapiccia
- Location within Sardinia
- Coordinates: 39°56′N 8°46′E
- Country: Italy
- Region: Sardinia
- Province: Province of Oristano (OR)

Area
  - Total: 17.9 km^{2} (6.9 sq mi)

Population (Dec. 2004)
  - Total: 365
  - Density: 20.4/km^{2} (52.8/sq mi)
- Time zone: UTC+1 (CET)
  - Summer (DST): UTC+2 (CEST)
- Postal code: 09084
- Dialing code: 0783

Siapiccia (Sardinian: Siapicìa) is a comune (municipality) in the Province of Oristano in the Italian region Sardinia, located about 90 kilometres (56 mi) northwest of Cagliari and about 15 kilometres (9 mi) east of Oristano. As of 31 December 2004, it had a population of 365 and an area of 17.9 square kilometres (6.9 mi^{2}).

Siapiccia borders the following municipalities: Allai, Fordongianus, Ollastra, Siamanna and Simaxis.

== Demographic evolution ==
Historical population

Year	Pop.	±%
1861	406	—
1871	399	−1.7%
1881	424	+6.3%
1901	336	−20.8%
1911	425	+26.5%

Year	Pop.	±%
1921	389	−8.5%
1931	407	+4.6%
1936	462	+13.5%
1951	524	+13.4%
1961	552	+5.3%

Year	Pop.	±%
1971	448	−18.8%
1981	390	−12.9%
1991	412	+5.6%
2001	376	−8.7%

Source: Data from ISTAT
