= Albagiara =

Albagiara Ollasta
- Comune
- Comune di Albagiara (Sardegna)
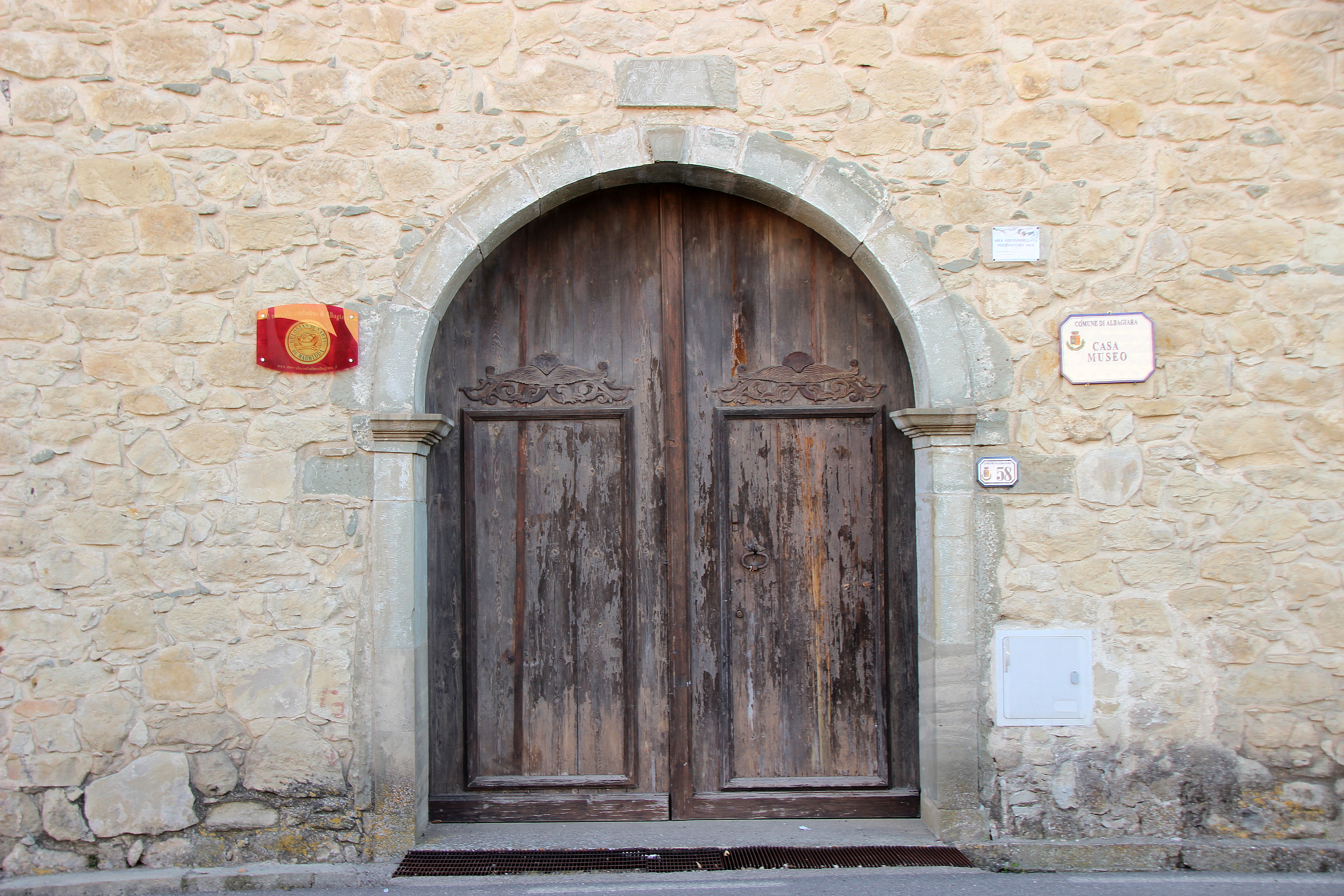
- Local museum

- Coat of arms

- Location of Albagiara in Sardinia
- Coordinates: 39°47′N 8°52′E
- Country: Italy
- Region: Sardinia
- Province: Oristano

Government
  - Mayor: Marco Marroccu

Area
  - Total: 8.87 km^{2} (3.42 sq mi)
- Elevation: 215 m (705 ft)

Population (2026)
  - Total: 219
  - Density: 24.7/km^{2} (63.9/sq mi)
- Demonyms: Albagiaresi; Ollastesus/Albagiaresus
- Time zone: UTC+1 (CET)
  - Summer (DST): UTC+2 (CEST)
- Postal code: 09090
- Dialing code: 0783
- Website: Official website

Albagiara (Sardinian: Ollasta), is a village and comune (municipality) in the Province of Oristano in the autonomous island region of Sardinia in Italy, located about 70 kilometres (43 mi) northwest of Cagliari and about 30 kilometres (19 mi) southeast of Oristano. It has 219 inhabitants.

The economy is based on agriculture and woodcraft.

Albagiara borders the municipalities of Ales, Assolo, Genoni, Gonnosnò, Mogorella, Usellus, and Villa Sant'Antonio.

== Demographics ==
As of 2026, the population is 219, of which 48.9% are male, and 51.1% are female. Minors make up 9.6% of the population, and seniors make up 39.7%.

Historical population

Year	Pop.	±%
1861	308	—
1871	392	+27.3%
1881	374	−4.6%
1901	394	+5.3%
1911	413	+4.8%
1921	462	+11.9%
1931	450	−2.6%
1936	456	+1.3%

Year	Pop.	±%
1951	542	+18.9%
1961	514	−5.2%
1971	453	−11.9%
1981	375	−17.2%
1991	310	−17.3%
2001	289	−6.8%
2011	277	−4.2%
2021	246	−11.2%

Source: ISTAT

=== Immigration ===
As of 2025, of the known countries of birth of 224 residents, the most numerous are: Italy (217 – 96.9%), Romania (2 – 0.9%), Kyrgyzstan (2 – 0.9%).
