= Senis =

- Comune
- Comune di Senis
- Location within Sardinia
- Coordinates: 39°49′N 8°56′E
- Country: Italy
- Region: Sardinia
- Province: Province of Oristano (OR)

Area
  - Total: 16.0 km^{2} (6.2 sq mi)

Population (Dec. 2004)
  - Total: 546
  - Density: 34.1/km^{2} (88.4/sq mi)
- Time zone: UTC+1 (CET)
  - Summer (DST): UTC+2 (CEST)
- Postal code: 09080
- Dialing code: 0783

Senis is a comune (municipality) in the Province of Oristano in the Italian region Sardinia, located about 70 kilometres (43 mi) north of Cagliari, and about 30 kilometres (19 mi) southeast of Oristano. As of 31 December 2004, it had a population of 546 and an area of 16.0 square kilometres (6.2 mi^{2}).

Senis borders the following municipalities: Assolo, Asuni, Laconi, Nureci, Villa Sant'Antonio.

== Demographic evolution ==
Historical population

Year	Pop.	±%
1861	769	—
1871	769	+0.0%
1881	769	+0.0%
1901	769	+0.0%
1911	769	+0.0%

Year	Pop.	±%
1921	769	+0.0%
1931	869	+13.0%
1936	869	+0.0%
1951	969	+11.5%
1961	1,069	+10.3%

Year	Pop.	±%
1971	1,069	+0.0%
1981	869	−18.7%
1991	669	−23.0%
2001	569	−14.9%

Source: Data from ISTAT
