= Simaxis =

Simaxis Simaghis
- Comune
- Comune di Simaxis
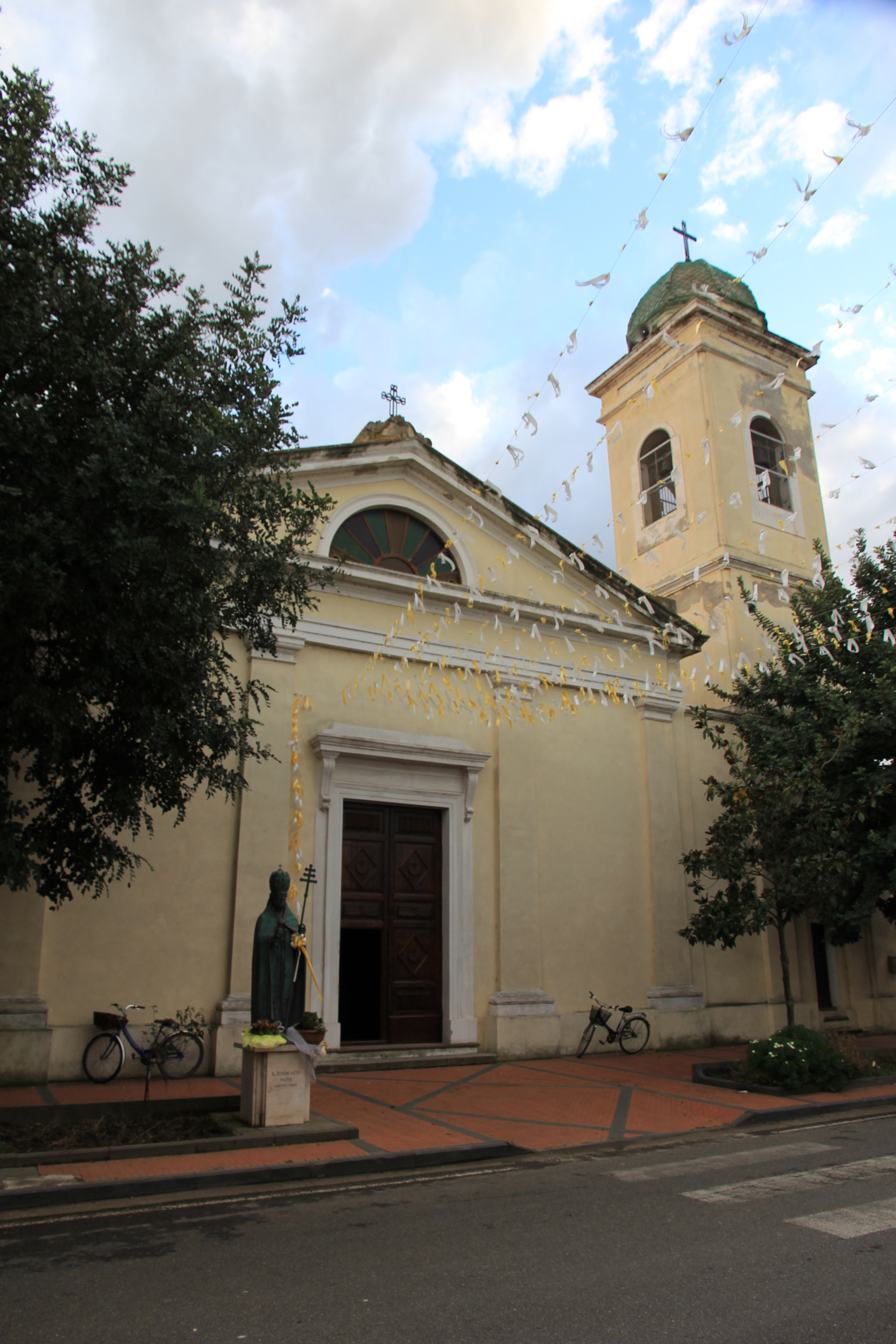
- Church of San Simaco Papa.

- Location within Sardinia
- Coordinates: 39°55′47″N 08°41′23″E
- Country: Italy
- Region: Sardinia
- Province: Oristano (OR)

Government
  - Mayor: Giacomo Obinu

Area
  - Total: 27.82 km^{2} (10.74 sq mi)
- Elevation: 7 m (23 ft)

Population (30 September 2014)
  - Total: 2,262
  - Density: 81.31/km^{2} (210.6/sq mi)
- Demonym(s): Simaxesi, Simaghesi
- Time zone: UTC+1 (CET)
  - Summer (DST): UTC+2 (CEST)
- Postal code: 09088
- Dialing code: 0783
- Website: Official website

Simaxis (Italian pronunciation: [siˈmaːʒis]; Sardinian: Simaghis [siˈmaɣizi] or Simaxis [siˈmaʒizi]) is a comune (municipality) in the Province of Oristano in the Italian region Sardinia, located about 90 kilometres (56 mi) northwest of Cagliari and about 11 kilometres (7 mi) northeast of Oristano.

Simaxis borders the following municipalities: Ollastra, Oristano, Siamanna, Siapiccia, Solarussa, Zerfaliu.
