= Pau, Sardinia =

Pau
- Comune
- Comune di Pau
- Location within Sardinia
- Coordinates: 39°48′N 8°48′E
- Country: Italy
- Region: Sardinia
- Province: Province of Oristano (OR)

Area
  - Total: 14.1 km^{2} (5.4 sq mi)
- Elevation: 315 m (1,033 ft)

Population (Dec. 2004)
  - Total: 330
  - Density: 23/km^{2} (61/sq mi)
- Demonym: Pauesi
- Time zone: UTC+1 (CET)
  - Summer (DST): UTC+2 (CEST)
- Postal code: 09090
- Dialing code: 0783
- Website: Official website

Pau is a commune in the Province of Oristano in the region of Sardinia, Italy, located about 70 kilometres (43 mi) northwest of Cagliari and about 20 kilometres (12 mi) southeast of Oristano. As of 31 December 2004, it had a population of 330 and an area of 14.1 square kilometres (5.4 mi^{2}).

Pau borders the following municipalities: Ales, Palmas Arborea, Santa Giusta, Villa Verde.

== Demographic evolution ==
Historical population

Year	Pop.	±%
1861	445	—
1871	461	+3.6%
1881	484	+5.0%
1901	518	+7.0%
1911	540	+4.2%

Year	Pop.	±%
1921	540	+0.0%
1931	560	+3.7%
1936	623	+11.3%
1951	748	+20.1%
1961	627	−16.2%

Year	Pop.	±%
1971	512	−18.3%
1981	518	+1.2%
1991	413	−20.3%
2001	353	−14.5%

Source: Data from ISTAT
