= Villanova Truschedu =

Villanova Truschedu Bidda Noa Truschedu
- Comune
- Comune di Villanova Truschedu
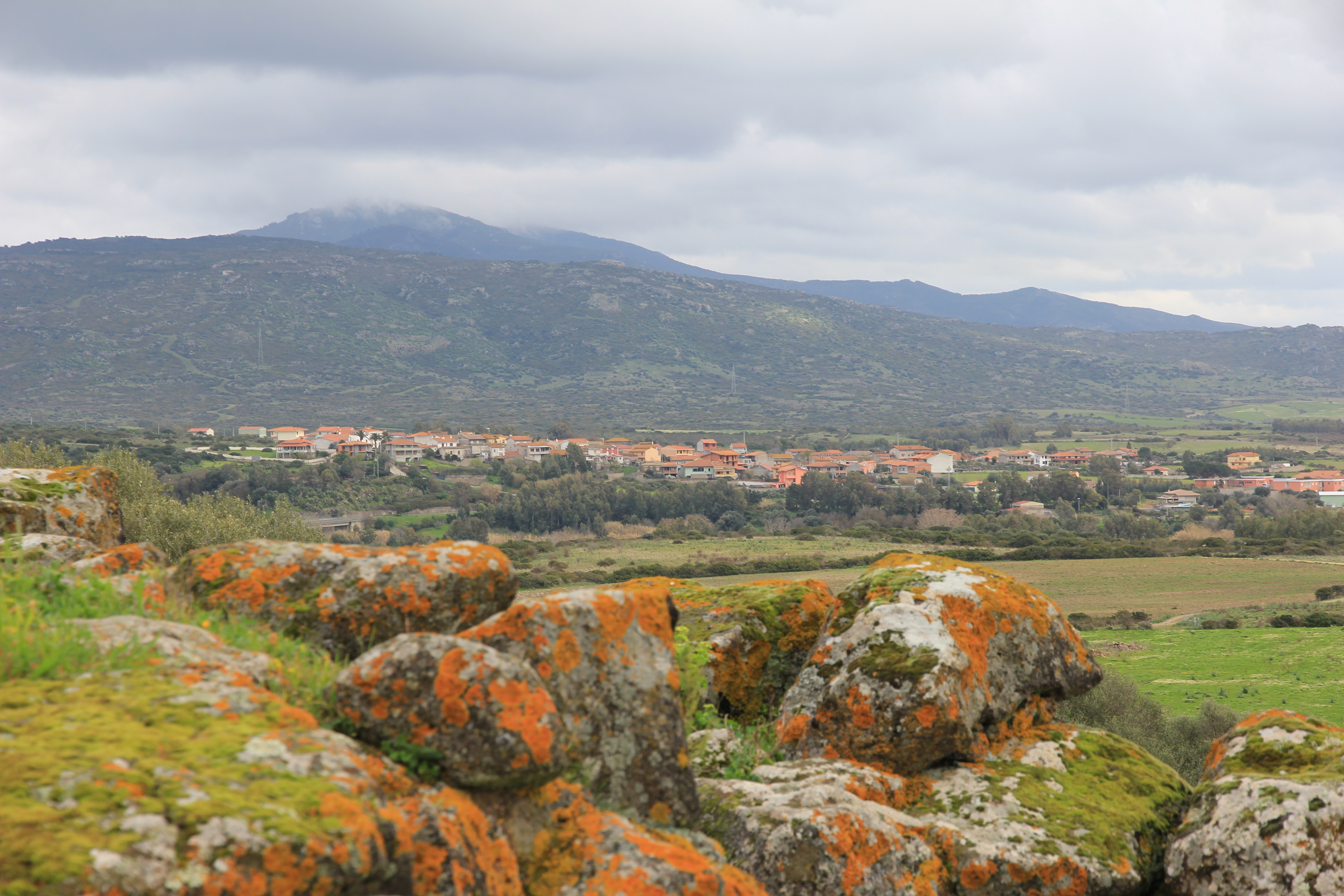

- Location within Sardinia
- Coordinates: 39°59′N 8°45′E
- Country: Italy
- Region: Sardinia
- Province: Province of Oristano (OR)

Area
  - Total: 16.5 km^{2} (6.4 sq mi)

Population (Dec. 2004)
  - Total: 335
  - Density: 20.3/km^{2} (52.6/sq mi)
- Time zone: UTC+1 (CET)
  - Summer (DST): UTC+2 (CEST)
- Postal code: 09084
- Dialing code: 0783

Villanova Truschedu, Bidda Noa Truschedu in Sardinian language, is a comune (municipality) in the Province of Oristano in the Italian region Sardinia, located about 90 kilometres (56 mi) northwest of Cagliari and about 15 kilometres (9 mi) northeast of Oristano. As of 31 December 2004, it had a population of 335 and an area of 16.5 square kilometres (6.4 mi^{2}).

Villanova Truschedu borders the following municipalities: Fordongianus, Ollastra, Paulilatino, Zerfaliu.

== Demographic evolution ==
Historical population

Year	Pop.	±%
1861	388	—
1871	408	+5.2%
1881	436	+6.9%
1901	497	+14.0%
1911	482	−3.0%

Year	Pop.	±%
1921	429	−11.0%
1931	458	+6.8%
1936	447	−2.4%
1951	446	−0.2%
1961	458	+2.7%

Year	Pop.	±%
1971	354	−22.7%
1981	364	+2.8%
1991	351	−3.6%
2001	321	−8.5%

Source: Data from ISTAT
