= Ruinas =

Ruinas Arruinas
- Comune
- Comune di Ruinas
- Location within Sardinia
- Coordinates: 39°54′N 8°54′E
- Country: Italy
- Region: Sardinia
- Province: Oristano (OR)

Government
  - Mayor: Ester Tatti

Area
  - Total: 30.46 km^{2} (11.76 sq mi)
- Elevation: 365 m (1,198 ft)

Population (30 November 2015)
  - Total: 669
  - Density: 22.0/km^{2} (56.9/sq mi)
- Demonym: Ruinesi
- Time zone: UTC+1 (CET)
  - Summer (DST): UTC+2 (CEST)
- Postal code: 09085
- Dialing code: 0783
- Website: Official website

Ruinas (Sardinian: Arruìnas) is a comune (municipality) in the Province of Oristano in the Italian region Sardinia, located about 80 kilometres (50 mi) north of Cagliari and about 25 kilometres (16 mi) east of Oristano.

Ruinas borders the following municipalities: Allai, Asuni, Mogorella, Samugheo, Siamanna, Villa Sant'Antonio, Villaurbana.
