= Ollastra =

Ollastra Ollasta
- Comune
- Comune di Ollastra
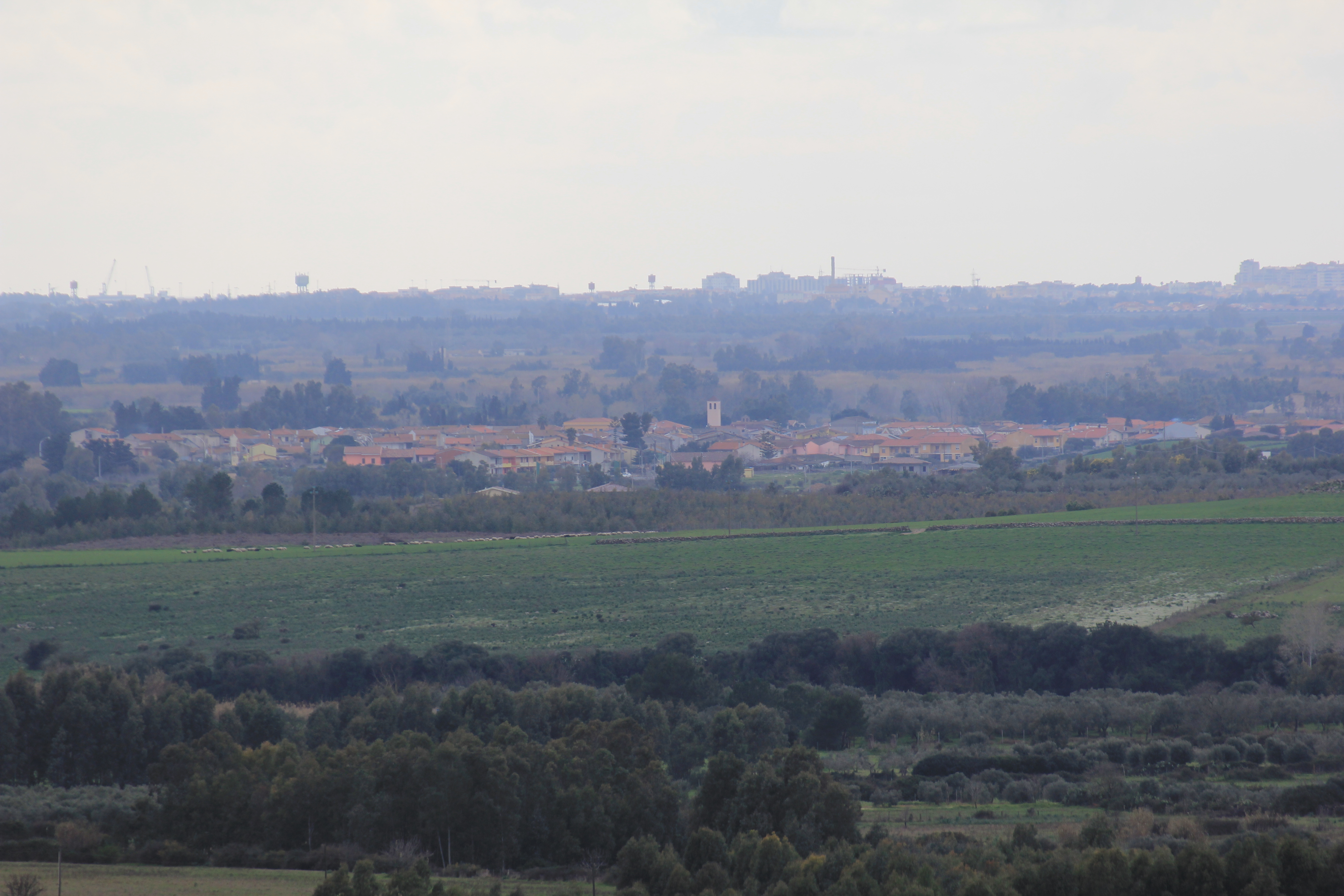

- Location within Sardinia
- Coordinates: 39°57′N 8°44′E
- Country: Italy
- Region: Sardinia
- Province: Province of Oristano (OR)

Government
  - Mayor: Giovannino Angelo Cianciotto

Area
  - Total: 21.47 km^{2} (8.29 sq mi)
- Elevation: 23 m (75 ft)

Population (31 December 2017)
  - Total: 1,212
  - Density: 56.45/km^{2} (146.2/sq mi)
- Demonym: Ollastrini
- Time zone: UTC+1 (CET)
  - Summer (DST): UTC+2 (CEST)
- Postal code: 09084
- Dialing code: 0783

Ollastra (Sardinian: Ollasta) is a comune (municipality) in the Province of Oristano in the Italian region Sardinia, located about 90 kilometres (56 mi) northwest of Cagliari and about 14 kilometres (9 mi) northeast of Oristano.

Ollastra Simaxis borders the following municipalities: Fordongianus, Siapiccia, Simaxis, Villanova Truschedu, Zerfaliu.

From 1928 to 1946 the place was a frazione of nearby Simaxis and was therefore known as Ollastra Simaxis. It changed its name to simply Ollastra in 1991.
