= Villaurbana =

Villaurbana Biddobrana
- Comune
- Comune di Villaurbana
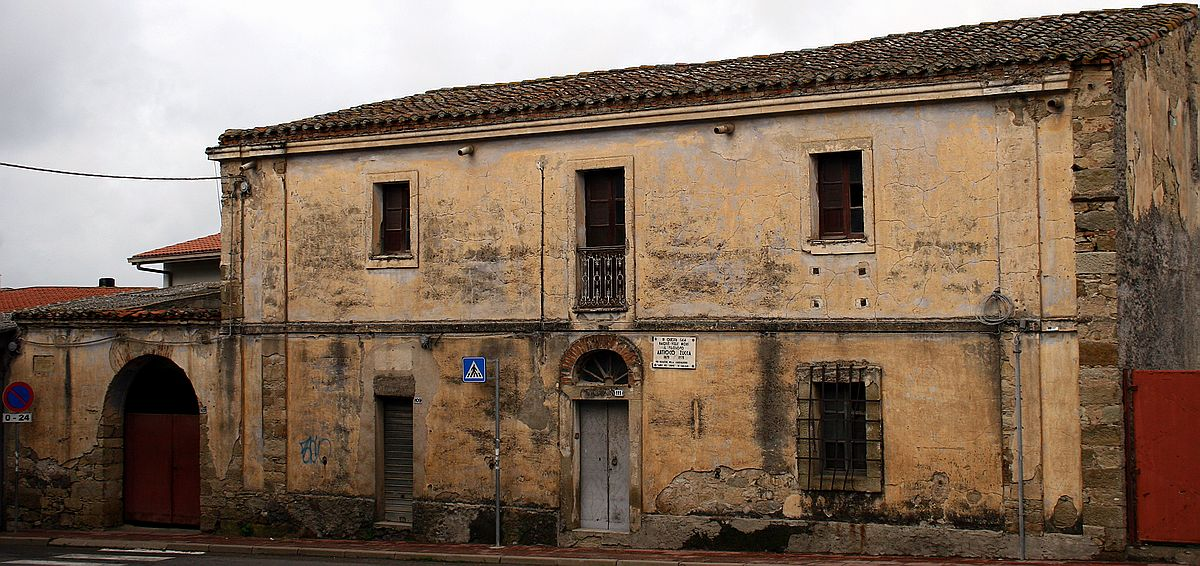
- The birthhouse of Antioco Zucca

- Location within Sardinia
- Coordinates: 39°53′N 8°47′E
- Country: Italy
- Region: Sardinia
- Province: Oristano (OR)

Government
  - Mayor: Paolo Pireddu

Area
  - Total: 58.7 km^{2} (22.7 sq mi)
- Elevation: 80 m (260 ft)

Population (31 December 2016)
  - Total: 1,645
  - Density: 28.0/km^{2} (72.6/sq mi)
- Demonym: Villaurbanesi
- Time zone: UTC+1 (CET)
  - Summer (DST): UTC+2 (CEST)
- Postal code: 09080
- Dialing code: 0783
- Website: Official website

Villaurbana (Biddobrana in Sardinian language) is a comune (municipality) in the Province of Oristano in the Italian region Sardinia, located about 80 kilometres (50 mi) northwest of Cagliari and about 15 kilometres (9 mi) east of Oristano.

Villaurbana borders the following municipalities: Allai, Mogorella, Oristano, Palmas Arborea, Ruinas, Siamanna, Usellus, Villa Verde.
