= Siamanna =

- Comune
- Comune di Siamanna
- Location within Sardinia
- Coordinates: 39°55′N 8°46′E
- Country: Italy
- Region: Sardinia
- Province: Oristano (OR)
- Frazioni: Pranixeddu

Government
  - Mayor: Franco Vellio Melas

Area
  - Total: 28.36 km^{2} (10.95 sq mi)
- Elevation: 100 m (330 ft)

Population (28 February 2017)
  - Total: 811
  - Density: 28.6/km^{2} (74.1/sq mi)
- Demonym: Siamannesi
- Time zone: UTC+1 (CET)
  - Summer (DST): UTC+2 (CEST)
- Postal code: 09080
- Dialing code: 0783
- Website: Official website

Siamanna is a comune (municipality) in the Province of Oristano in the Italian region Sardinia, located about 80 kilometres (50 mi) northwest of Cagliari and about 15 kilometres (9 mi) east of Oristano.

Siamanna borders the following municipalities: Allai, Oristano, Ruinas, Siapiccia, Simaxis, Villaurbana.
