= Nureci =

- Comune
- Comune di Nureci
- Location within Sardinia
- Coordinates: 39°49′N 8°59′E
- Country: Italy
- Region: Sardinia
- Province: Province of Oristano (OR)

Area
  - Total: 12.9 km^{2} (5.0 sq mi)

Population (Dec. 2004)
  - Total: 379
  - Density: 29.4/km^{2} (76.1/sq mi)
- Time zone: UTC+1 (CET)
  - Summer (DST): UTC+2 (CEST)
- Postal code: 09080
- Dialing code: 0783

Nureci is a comune (municipality) in the Province of Oristano in the Italian region Sardinia, located about 70 kilometres (43 mi) north of Cagliari and about 35 kilometres (22 mi) east of Oristano. As of 31 December 2004, it had a population of 379 and an area of 12.9 square kilometres (5.0 mi^{2}).

Nureci borders the following municipalities: Assolo, Genoni, Laconi, Senis.

== Demographic evolution ==
Historical population

Year	Pop.	±%
1861	552	—
1871	445	−19.4%
1881	459	+3.1%
1901	554	+20.7%
1911	533	−3.8%

Year	Pop.	±%
1921	562	+5.4%
1931	548	−2.5%
1936	577	+5.3%
1951	701	+21.5%
1961	711	+1.4%

Year	Pop.	±%
1971	666	−6.3%
1981	586	−12.0%
1991	486	−17.1%
2001	393	−19.1%

Source: Data from ISTAT
