= Mogorella =

Mogorella Mogoredda
- Comune
- Comune di Mogorella
- Location within Sardinia
- Coordinates: 39°52′N 8°52′E
- Country: Italy
- Region: Sardinia
- Province: Oristano (OR)

Government
  - Mayor: Lorenzo Carcangiu

Area
  - Total: 17.06 km^{2} (6.59 sq mi)

Population (28 February 2017)
  - Total: 444
  - Density: 26.0/km^{2} (67.4/sq mi)
- Demonym: Mogorellesi
- Time zone: UTC+1 (CET)
  - Summer (DST): UTC+2 (CEST)
- Postal code: 09080
- Dialing code: 0783
- Website: Official website

Mogorella, Mogoredda in Sardinian language, is a comune (municipality) in the Province of Oristano in the Italian region Sardinia, located about 80 kilometres (50 mi) northwest of Cagliari and about 25 kilometres (16 mi) east of Oristano.

Mogorella borders the following municipalities: Albagiara, Ruinas, Usellus, Villa Sant'Antonio, and Villaurbana.
