= Villa Verde =

Villa Verde Bàini
- Comune
- Comune di Villa Verde
- Location within Sardinia
- Coordinates: 39°48′N 8°49′E
- Country: Italy
- Region: Sardinia
- Province: Oristano (OR)

Government
  - Mayor: Sandro Marchi

Area
  - Total: 17.3 km^{2} (6.7 sq mi)
- Elevation: 204 m (669 ft)

Population (31 December 2016)
  - Total: 319
  - Density: 18.4/km^{2} (47.8/sq mi)
- Demonym: Villaverdini
- Time zone: UTC+1 (CET)
  - Summer (DST): UTC+2 (CEST)
- Postal code: 09090
- Dialing code: 0783
- Website: Official website

Villa Verde, Bàini in Sardinian language, is a comune (municipality) in the Province of Oristano in the Italian region Sardinia, located about 70 kilometres (43 mi) northwest of Cagliari and about 25 kilometres (16 mi) southeast of Oristano.

Villa Verde borders the following municipalities: Ales, Palmas Arborea, Pau, Usellus, Villaurbana.
