= Allai, Sardinia =

Allai
- Comune
- Comune di Allai
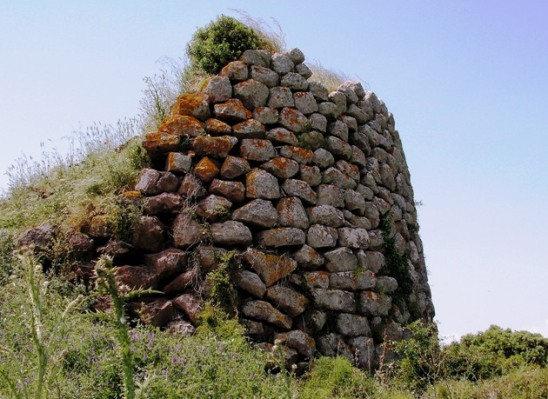
- Nuraghe

- Location of Allai in Sardinia
- Coordinates: 39°57′N 8°52′E
- Country: Italy
- Region: Sardinia
- Province: Oristano

Government
  - Mayor: Antonio Pili

Area
  - Total: 27.36 km^{2} (10.56 sq mi)
- Elevation: 60 m (200 ft)

Population (2026)
  - Total: 333
  - Density: 12.2/km^{2} (31.5/sq mi)
- Demonyms: Allaesi; Allesus
- Time zone: UTC+1 (CET)
  - Summer (DST): UTC+2 (CEST)
- Postal code: 09080
- Dialing code: 0783
- Website: Official website

Allai (Sardinian: Àllai) is a village and comune (municipality) in the Province of Oristano in the autonomous island region of Sardinia in Italy, located about 80 kilometres (50 mi) north of Cagliari and about 25 kilometres (16 mi) east of Oristano. It has 333 inhabitants.

Allai borders the municipalities of Busachi, Fordongianus, Ruinas, Samugheo, Siamanna, Siapiccia, and Villaurbana.

== Demographics ==
As of 2026, the population is 333, of which 51.1% are male, and 48.9% are female. Minors make up 9.3% of the population, and seniors make up 33.9%.

Historical population

Year	Pop.	±%
1861	657	—
1871	661	+0.6%
1881	689	+4.2%
1901	645	−6.4%
1911	699	+8.4%
1921	661	−5.4%
1931	679	+2.7%
1936	667	−1.8%

Year	Pop.	±%
1951	752	+12.7%
1961	783	+4.1%
1971	601	−23.2%
1981	513	−14.6%
1991	466	−9.2%
2001	413	−11.4%
2011	370	−10.4%
2021	358	−3.2%

Source: ISTAT

=== Immigration ===
As of 2025, of the known countries of birth of 331 residents, the most numerous are: Italy (317 – 95.8%), Germany (10 – 3%).
