= Villa Sant'Antonio =

Villa Sant'Antonio Sant'Antoni
- Comune
- Comune di Villa Sant'Antonio
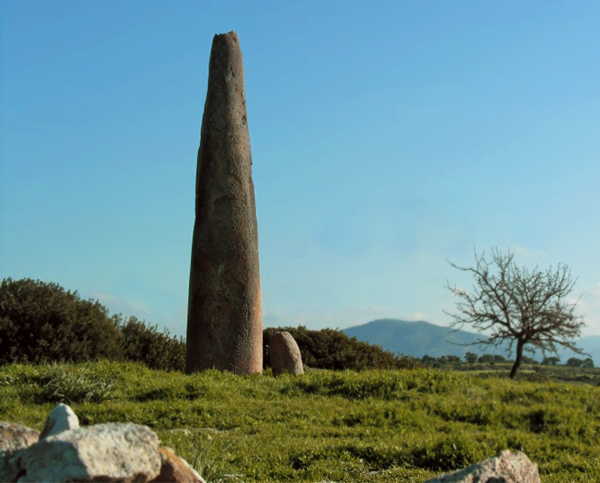
- Menhir of Monte Corru

- Location within Sardinia
- Coordinates: 39°52′N 8°54′E
- Country: Italy
- Region: Sardinia
- Province: Oristano (OR)

Government
  - Mayor: Fabiano Frongia

Area
  - Total: 19.05 km^{2} (7.36 sq mi)
- Elevation: 249 m (817 ft)

Population (31 December 2016)
  - Total: 352
  - Density: 18.5/km^{2} (47.9/sq mi)
- Demonym: Santantonesi
- Time zone: UTC+1 (CET)
  - Summer (DST): UTC+2 (CEST)
- Postal code: 09080
- Dialing code: 0783
- Website: Official website

Villa Sant'Antonio (Sant'Antoni in Sardinian language) is a comune (municipality) in the Province of Oristano in the Italian region Sardinia, located about 70 kilometres (43 mi) north of Cagliari and about 25 kilometres (16 mi) east of Oristano.

Villa Sant'Antonio borders the following municipalities: Albagiara, Assolo, Asuni, Mogorella, Ruinas, Senis.
