= Funtana Coberta =

Subterranean temple in Sardinia, Italy

Coordinates: 39°34′51.94″N 9°21′7.02″E

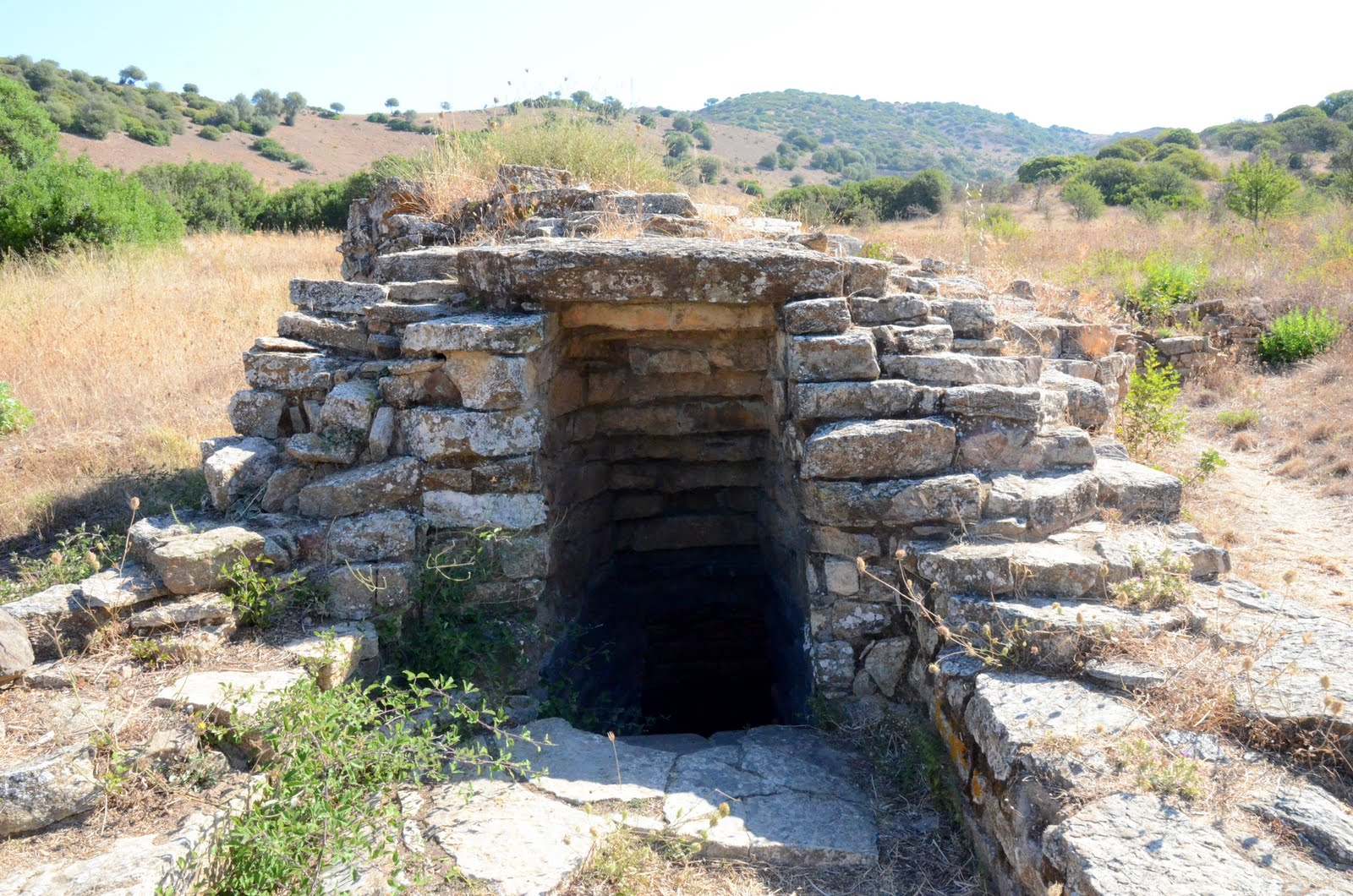
- Covered entrance to the sacred well

- Location within Sardinia
- Type: well
- Periods: Nuragic civilization
- Cultures: Nuragic
- Location: Comune di Ballao, province of Cagliari
- Region: Sardegna

Site notes
- Excavation dates: Antonio Taramelli; Maria Rosaria Manunza.
- Public access: yes
- Website: Ballao, Pozzo Sacro di Funtana Coberta

Funtana Coberta (Sardinian: Sa Funtana Coberta) is a holy pit (subterranean temple) in Sarrabus-Gerrei, a traditional subregion of Sardinia, Italy. Dating to c. 1200–850 BC, it is included in the territory of Ballao, in the province of Cagliari. It was excavated in 1918 by Antonio Taramelli, and again in 1994 by Maria Rosaria Manunza.

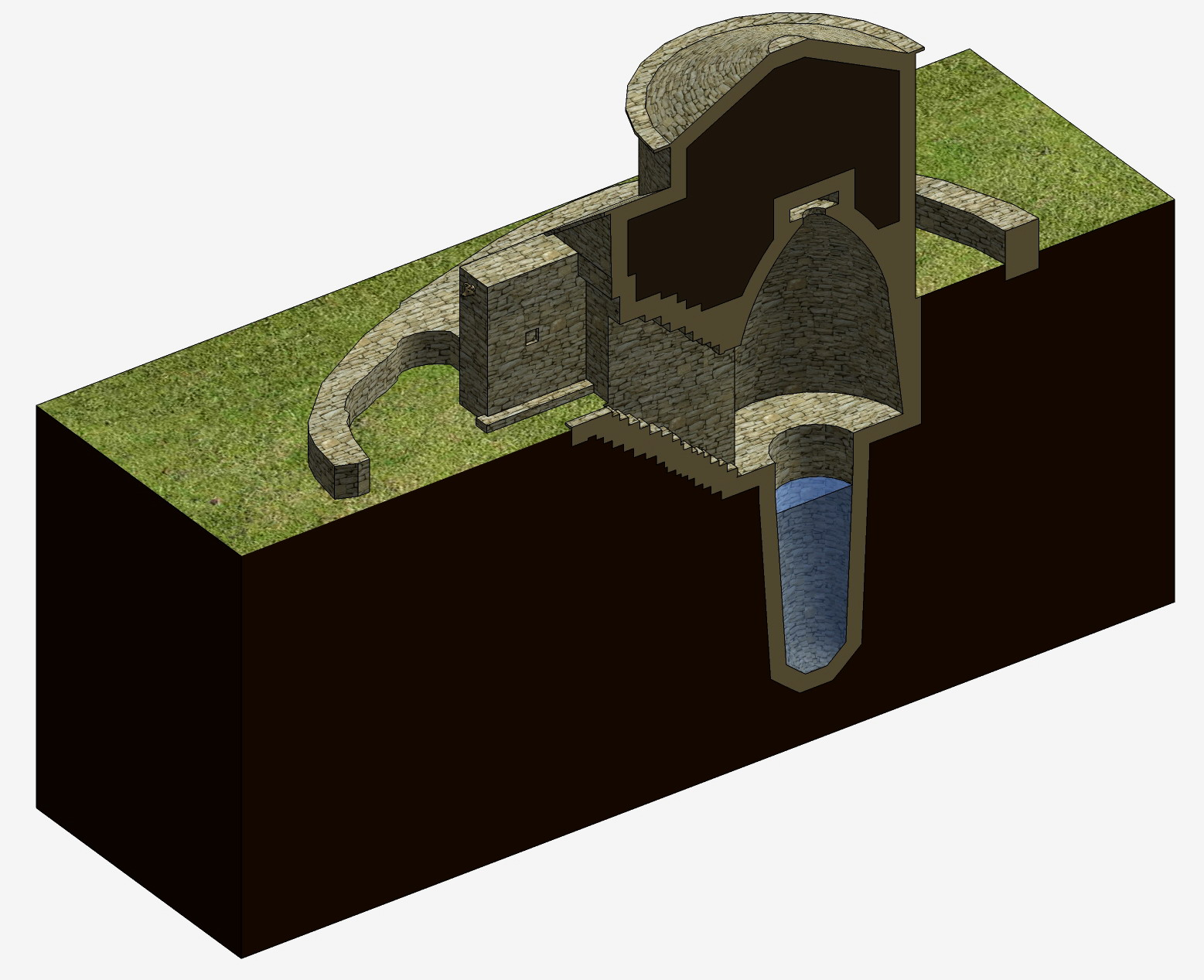
Reconstruction of Funtana Coberta Well

It is composed of roughly parallelepiped-shaped limestone rocks, with a length of 10.60 m.

== Sources ==
- Lilliu, Giovanni (1980). La civiltà dei Sardi. Turin: ERI Edizioni RAI.
