= Nuragic holy well =

Sardinian hypogean Bronze Age structure for the worship of water

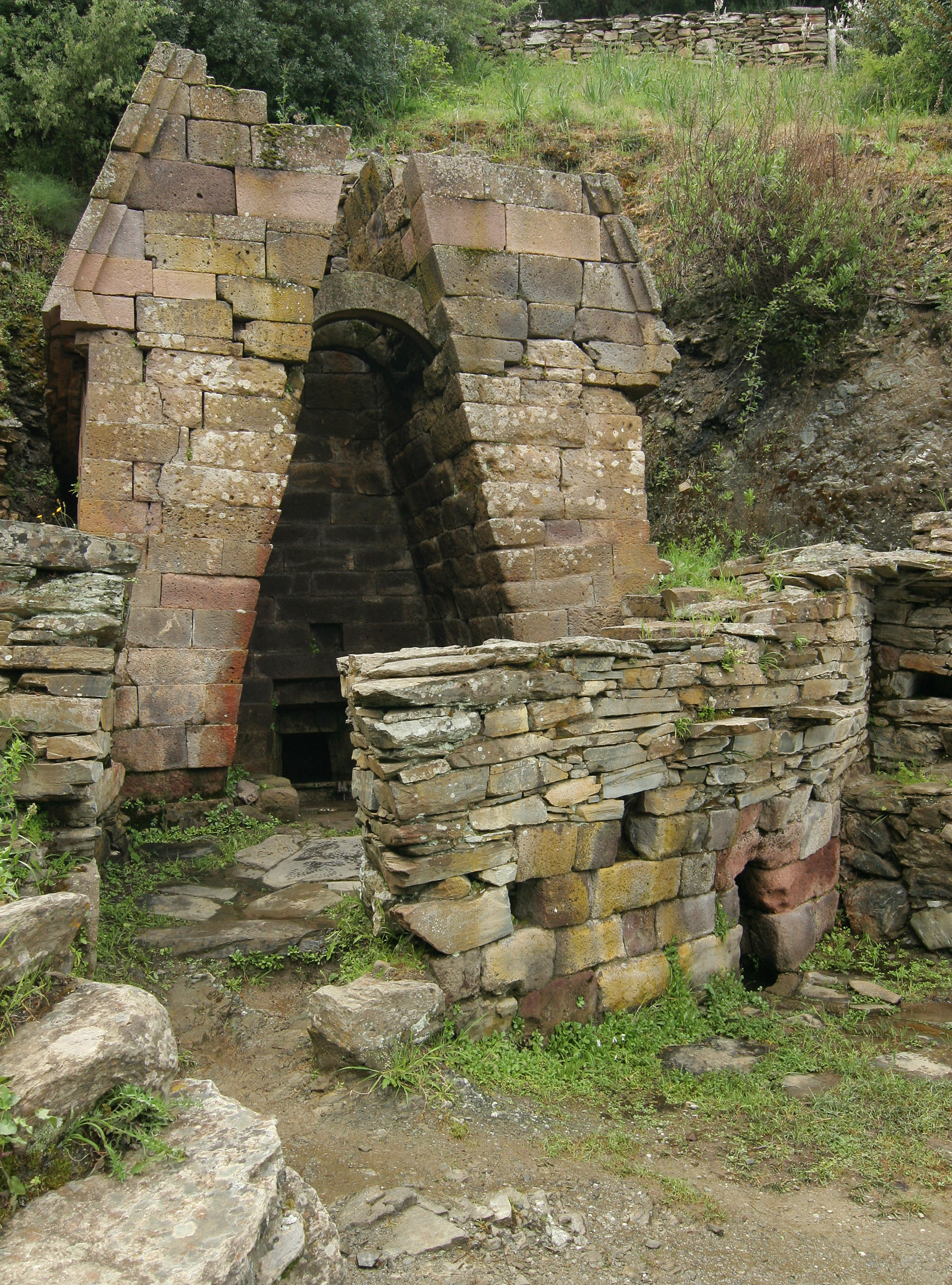
Orune, Su Tempiesu

The nuragic holy well is a Sardinian Bronze Age structure for the worship of the waters. Scattered throughout the island, along with the Giants' grave and the megaron temples, they testify to the deep religiosity of the Nuragic populations. These temples were a place of pilgrimage and ceremonies: it is believed that at certain times of year the various nuragic populations of the area gathered together in their vicinity.

== Architecture ==
The oldest temples were built in the style of the nuraghe, with blocks of stone not perfectly squared; over time they were built with a greater accuracy. The most common type is composed of a circular well built with blocks of stone, which was accessed by steps that descended to water level. They are a clear example of the architectural mastery of the nuragic peoples and evidence of their reverence for water sources.

== Dating ==
In the past it was thought that they were built between the eighth and sixth centuries BC; the latest findings, however, have led archaeologists to estimate that the temples date from the time when there was a close relationship between the Mycenaean kingdoms, Crete and Sardinia (around 1300 BC). An almost certain dating comes from recent excavations in the Holy Well of Funtana Coberta, near Ballao, which lack completely Iron Age nuragic ceramics, while there are finds from the Aegean. The Well of Ballao was probably built in the late Bronze Age and abandoned some centuries later.

== Image gallery ==
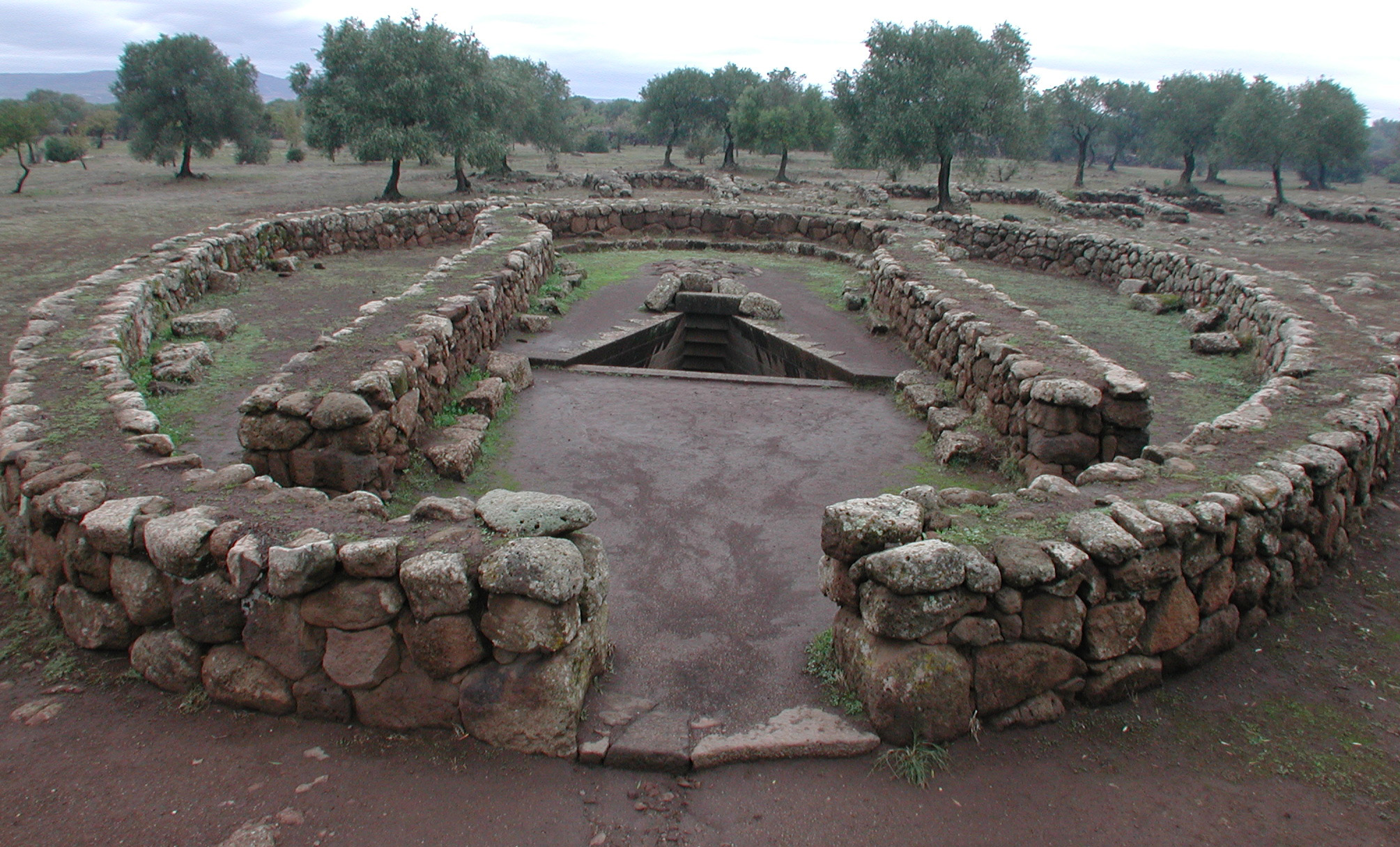
Holy well of Santa Cristina

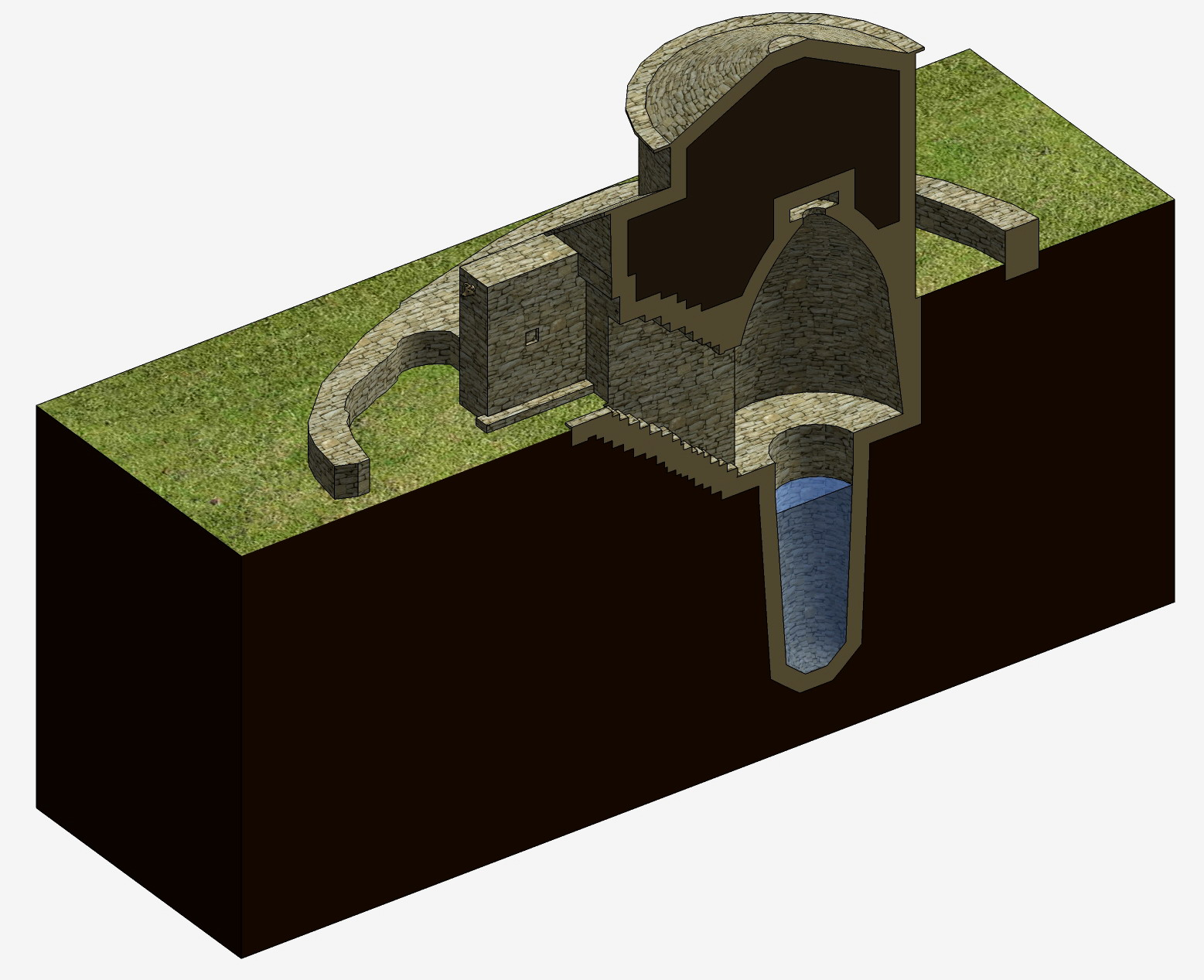
Reconstruction of the holy well of Funtana Coberta

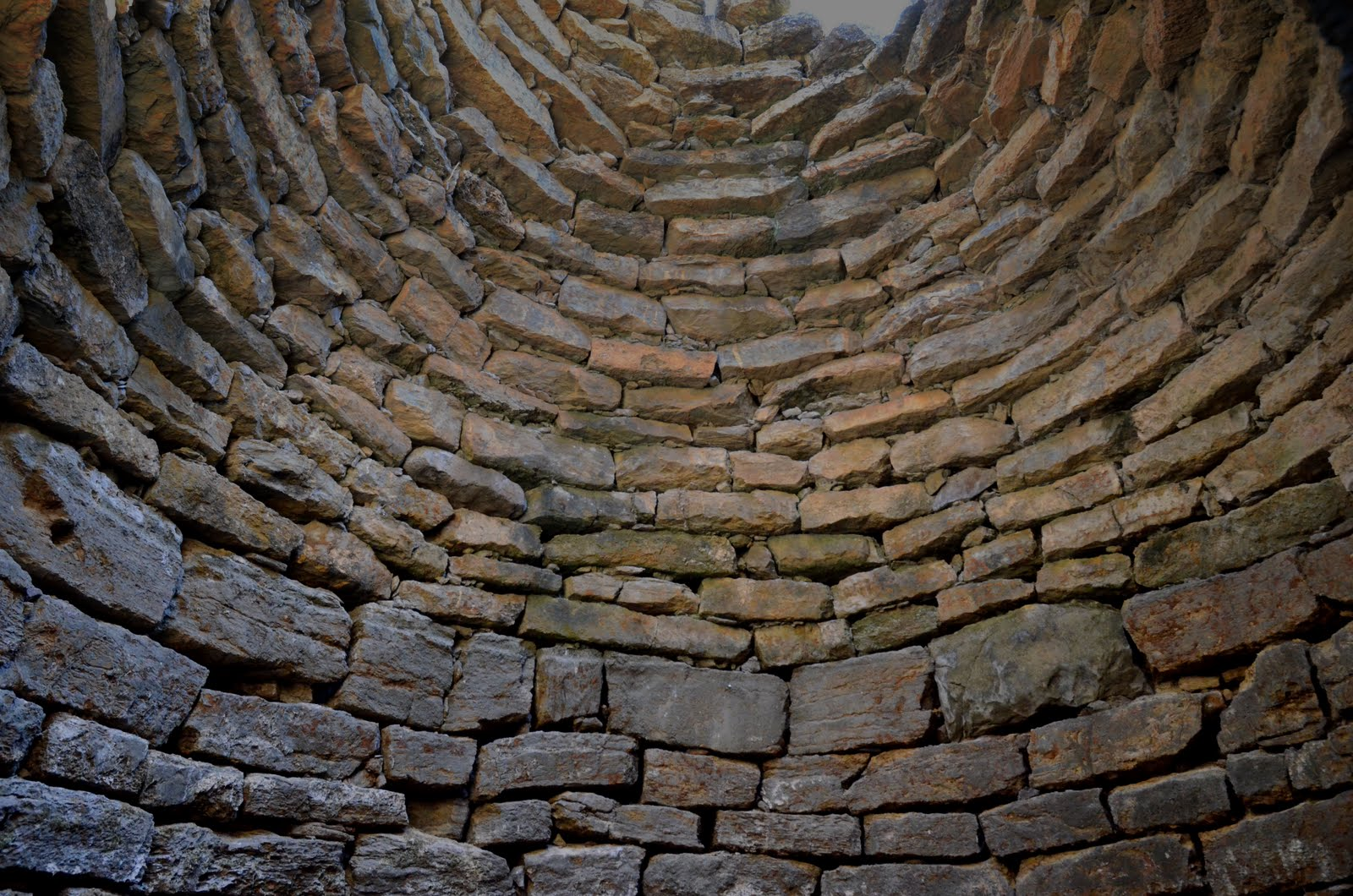
Tholoi of the Funtana Coberta well

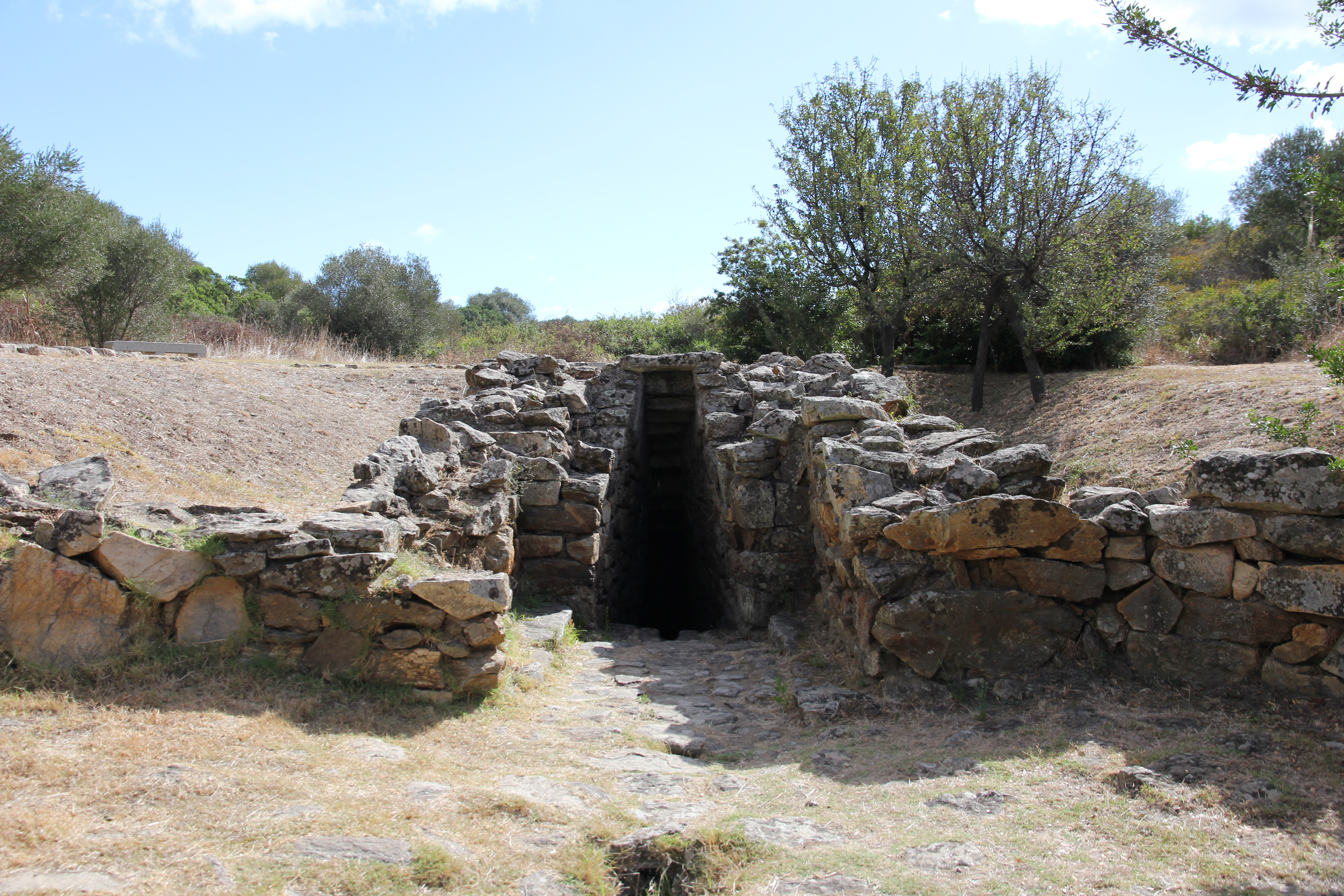
Sa Testa, Olbia

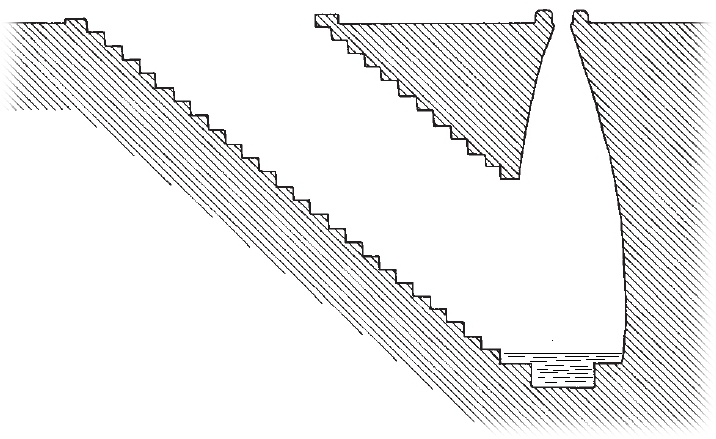
Santa Cristina holy well (section), Paulilatino

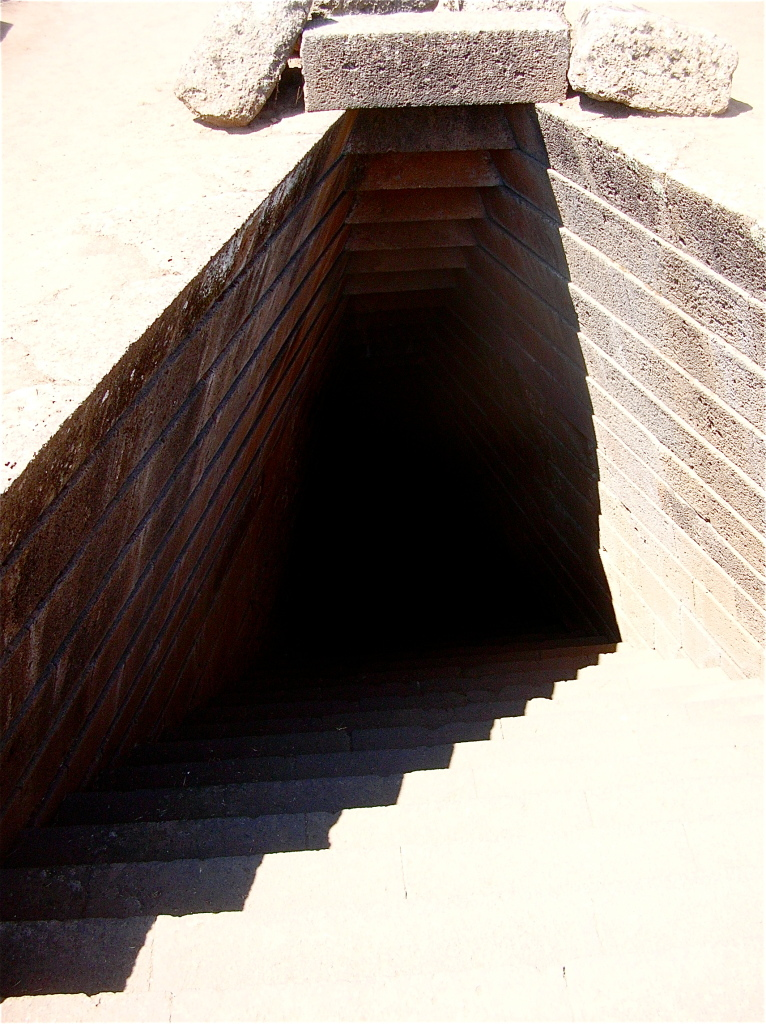
Holy well of Santa Cristina

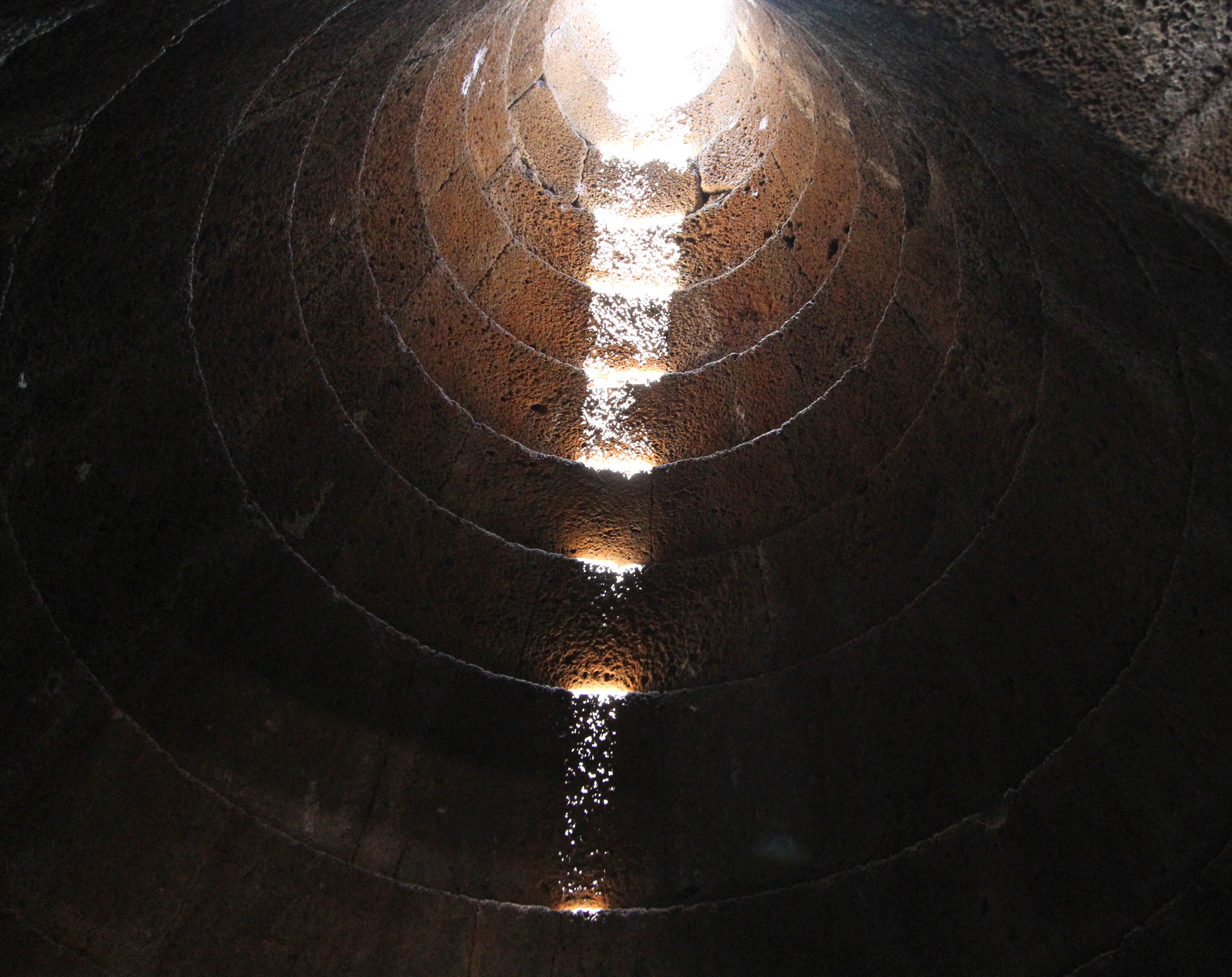
Underground tholos of the Santa Cristina temple

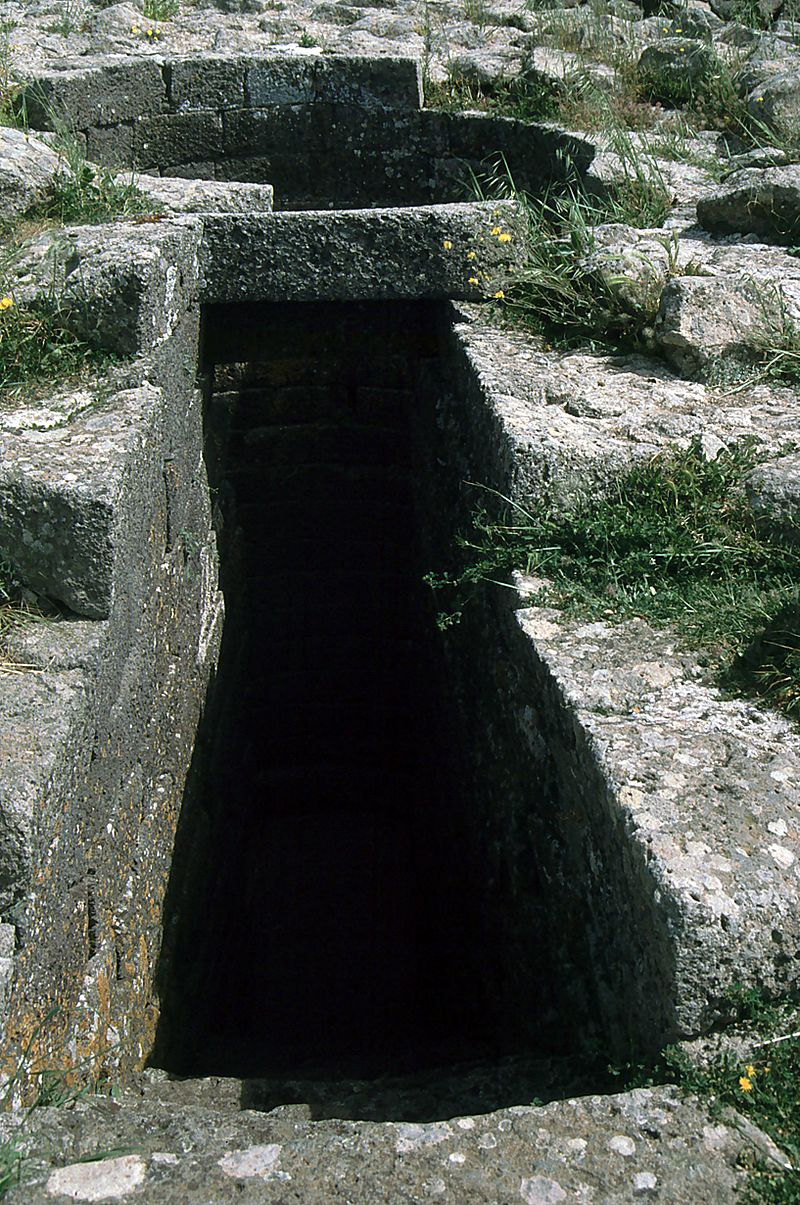
Nuragic well temple at Serri

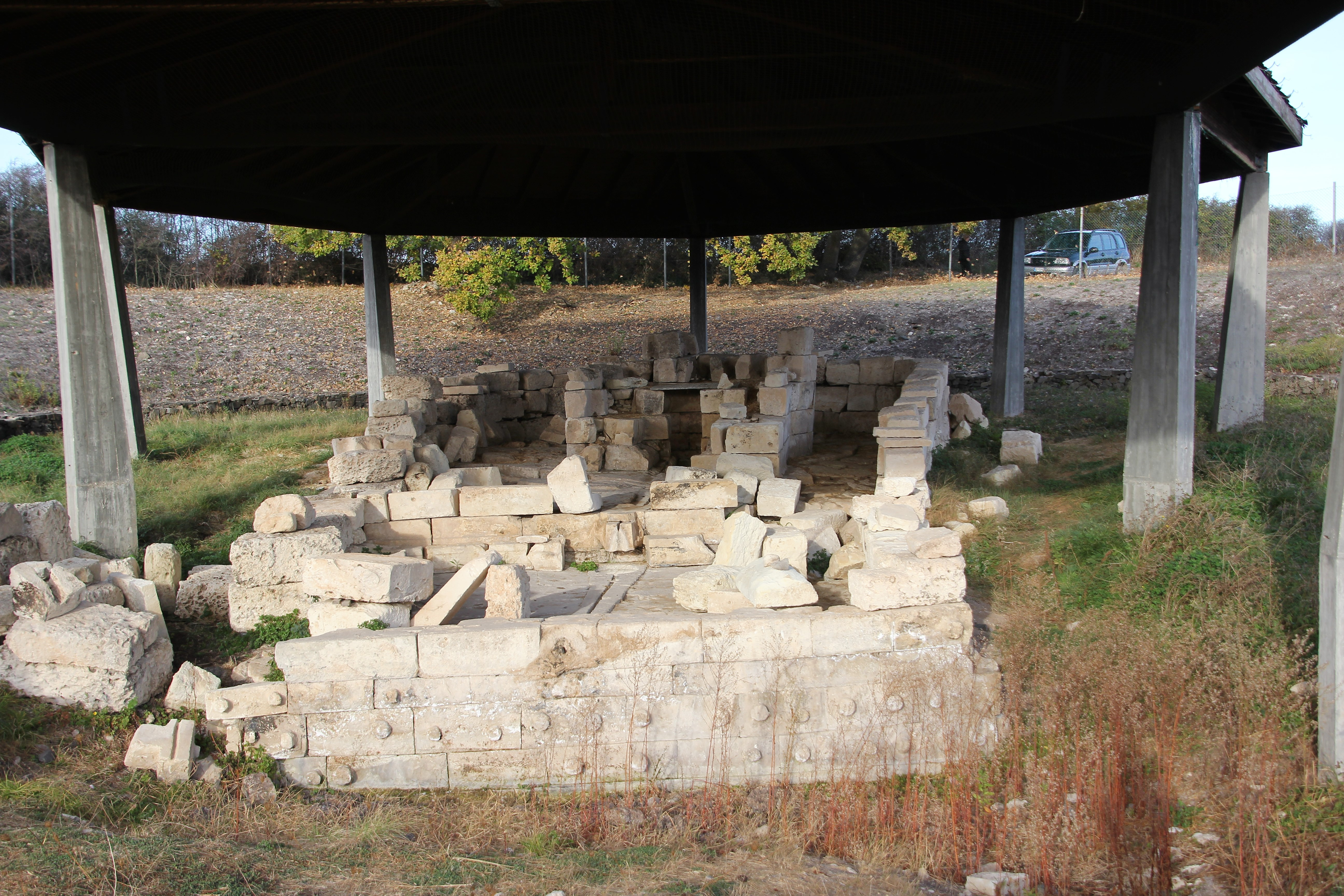
Nulvi, Nuragic holy well of Irrù

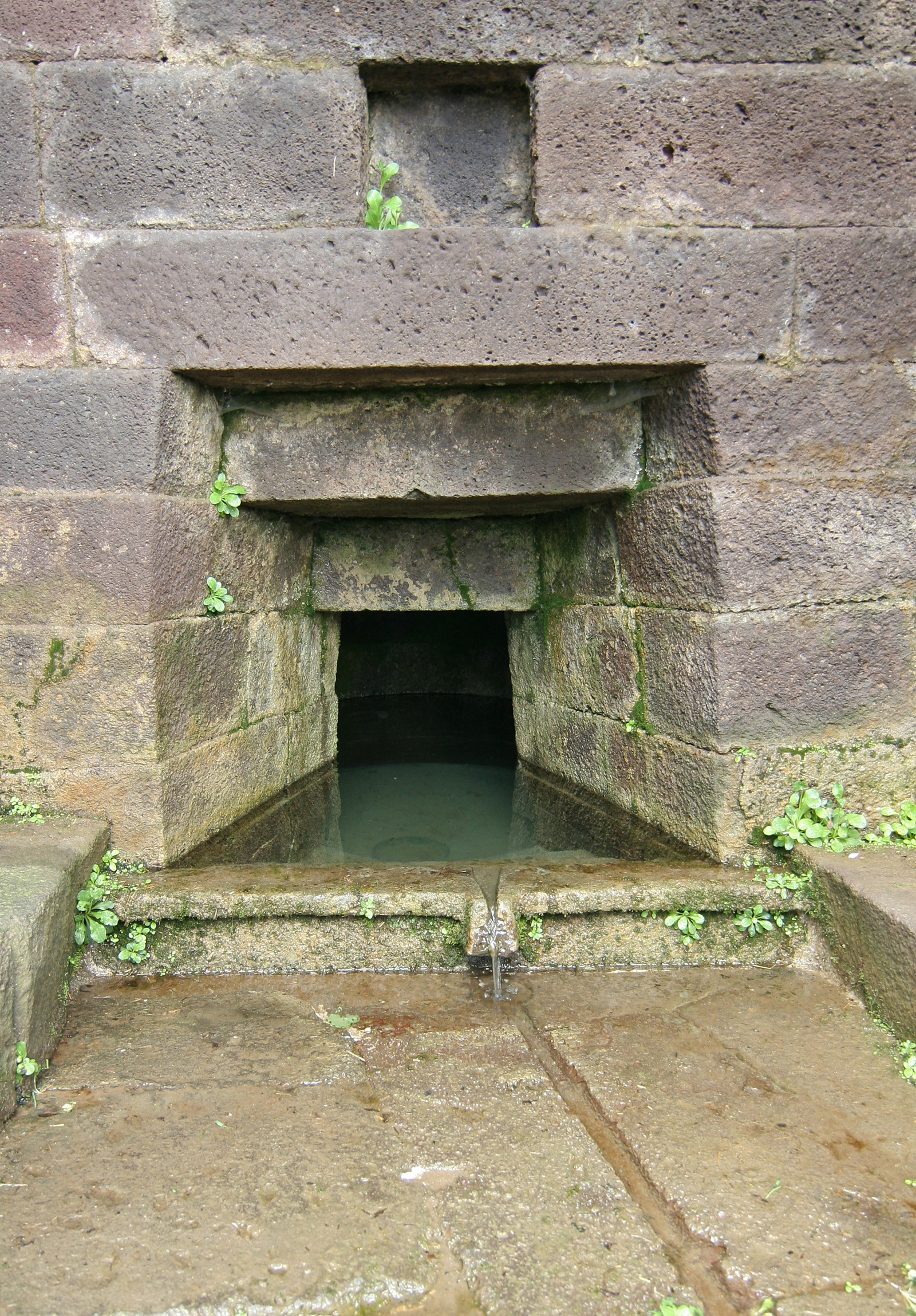
Su Tempiesu detail

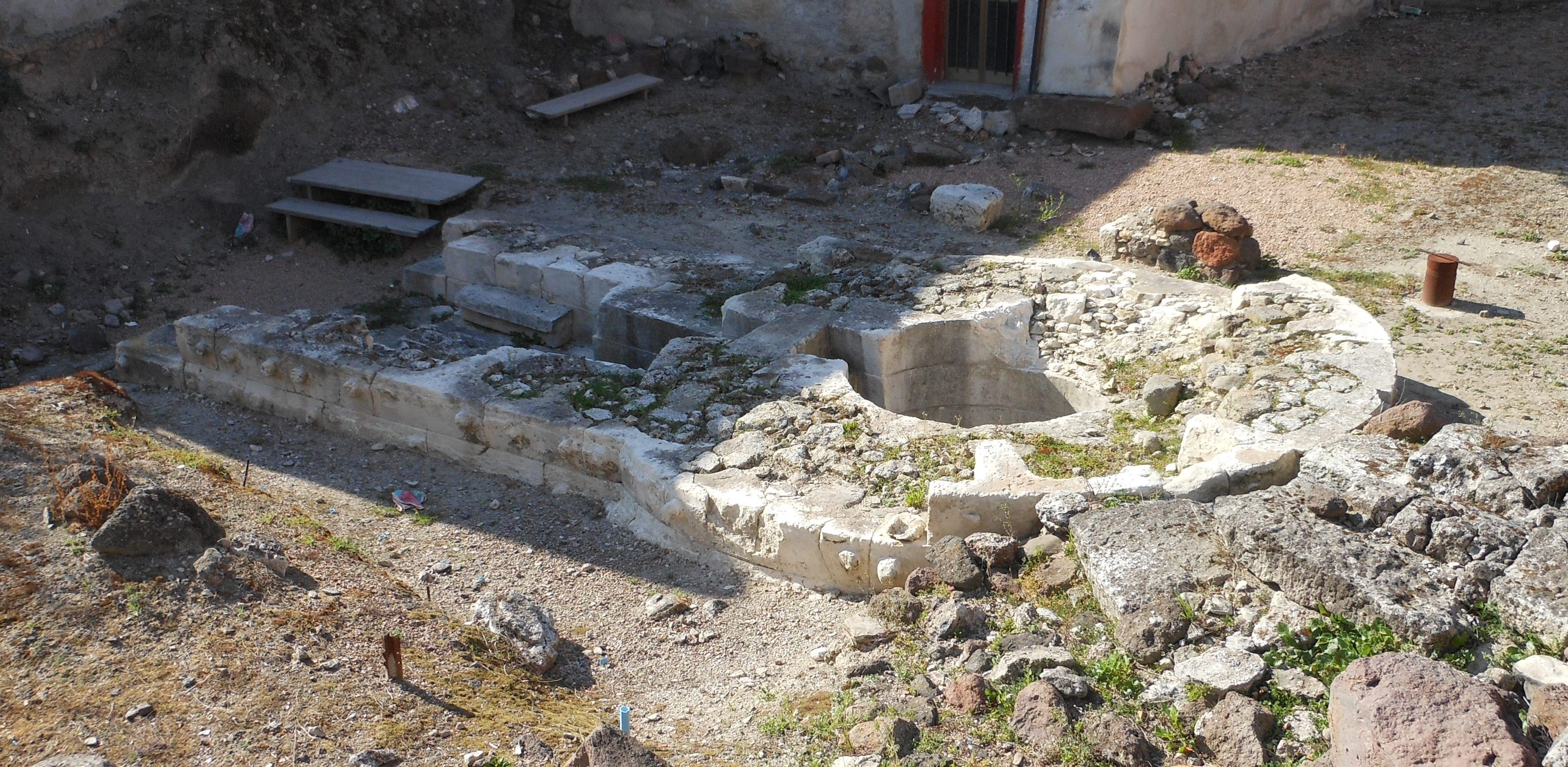
Perfugas - Holy well of Predio Canopoli

== See also ==
- Clootie well
- Holy well

== Bibliography ==
- G Lilliu: Sardegna Nuragica, Edizioni Il Maestrale, 2006, ISBN 88-89801-11-5
- A.Moravetti: Il santuario nuragico di Santa Cristina; Editore Carlo Delfino, ISBN 88-7138-294-3,
- R.Pettazzoni, La religione primitiva in Sardegna, 1912, Società Editrice Pontremolese, Cagliari Biblioteca Nazionale .
- M. A. Fadda, F. Posi: Il villaggio nuragico Su Romanzesu, Editore Carlo Delfino, 2006, .
- Demurtas S. U. Manca Demurtas L. Santa Cristina e i siti archeologici nel territorio di Paulilatino 1999.
- Pitzalis G.: Il pozzo sacro di Predio Canopoli. Bollettino di Archeologia Perfugas. 1991.
- Lilliu, G. La civiltà dei Sardi dal neolitico all'età dei nuraghi. Torino - Edizioni ERI - 1967.
- Puddu M. G.: Recenti sondaggi di scavo a Santa Vittoria di Serri, in: La Sardegna nel Mediterraneo fra il Bronzo Medio e il Bronzo Recente. Atti del III Convegno di Studi.
- Lilliu G. Sculture della Sardegna nuragica Verona 1962.
- Aa.Vv., Ichnussa. La Sardegna dalle origini all'età classica - Milano, 1981.
- Paolo Melis: Nuraghenkultur 2003. ISBN 88-7138-276-5.
- Maria Rosaria Manunza (a cura di): Funtana Coberta. Tempio nuragico a Ballao nel Gerrei; ISBN 88-8775-82-04.
