= Fordongianus =

Fordongianus Fordongianis
- Comune
- Comune di Fordongianus
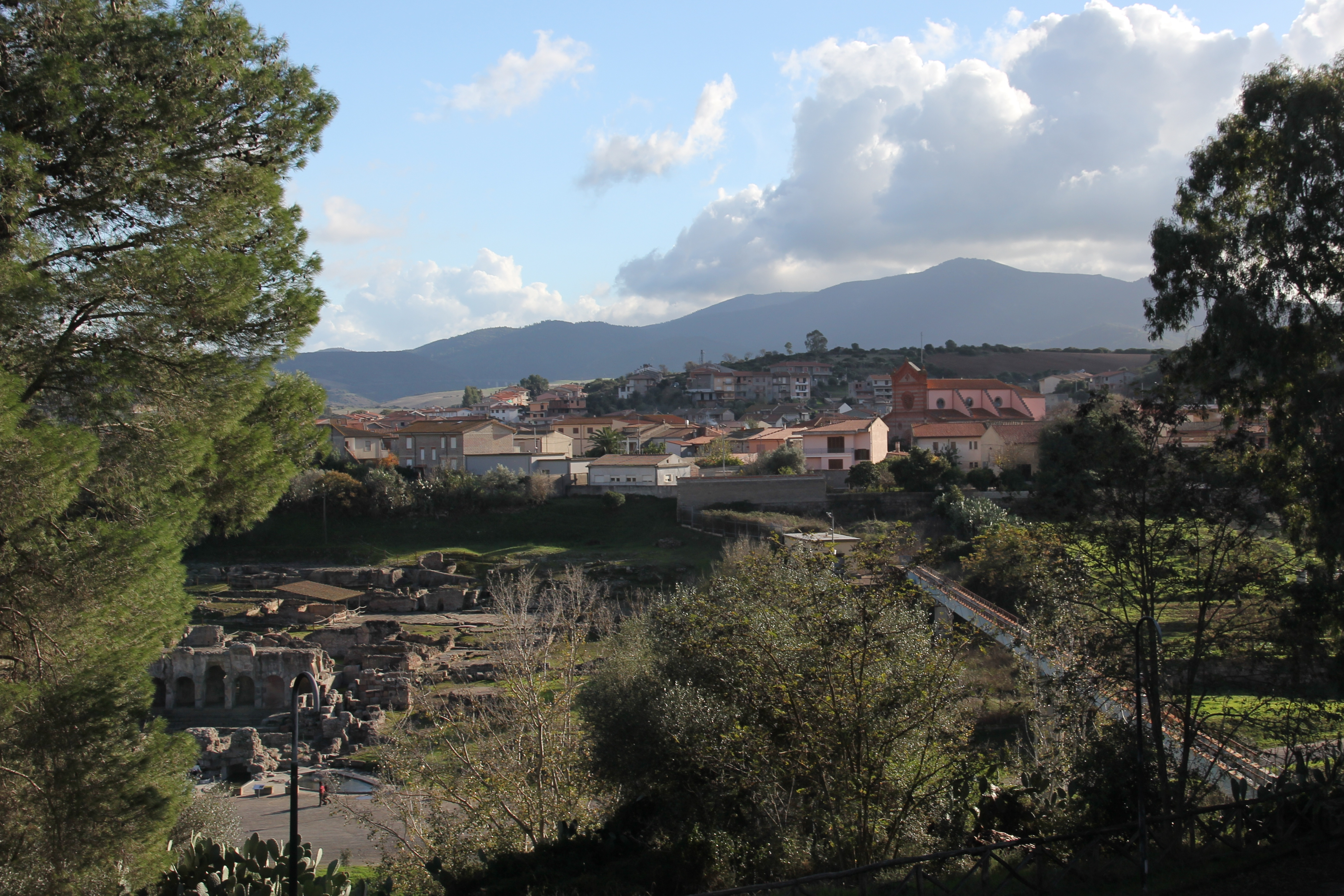
- Ancient Roman thermae

- Location within Sardinia
- Coordinates: 39.994836°N 8.809556°E
- Country: Italy
- Region: Sardinia
- Province: Province of Oristano (OR)

Area
  - Total: 39.4 km^{2} (15.2 sq mi)

Population (Dec. 2004)
  - Total: 1,037
  - Density: 26.3/km^{2} (68.2/sq mi)
- Demonym(s): Fordongianesi; Fordongianesus
- Time zone: UTC+1 (CET)
  - Summer (DST): UTC+2 (CEST)
- Postal code: 09083
- Dialing code: 0783
- Website: Official website

Fordongianus (Sardinian: Fordongianis; Ancient Greek: Hydata Hypsitana; Latin: Aquae Hypsitanae or Forum Trajani) is a comune (municipality) in the Province of Oristano in the Italian region of Sardinia, located about 90 kilometres (56 mi) northwest of Cagliari and about 25 kilometres (16 mi) northeast of Oristano. As of 31 December 2004, it had a population of 1,037 and an area of 39.4 square kilometres (15.2 mi^{2}).

Fordongianus borders the following municipalities: Allai, Busachi, Ghilarza, Ollastra, Paulilatino, Siapiccia, Villanova Truschedu.

== History ==
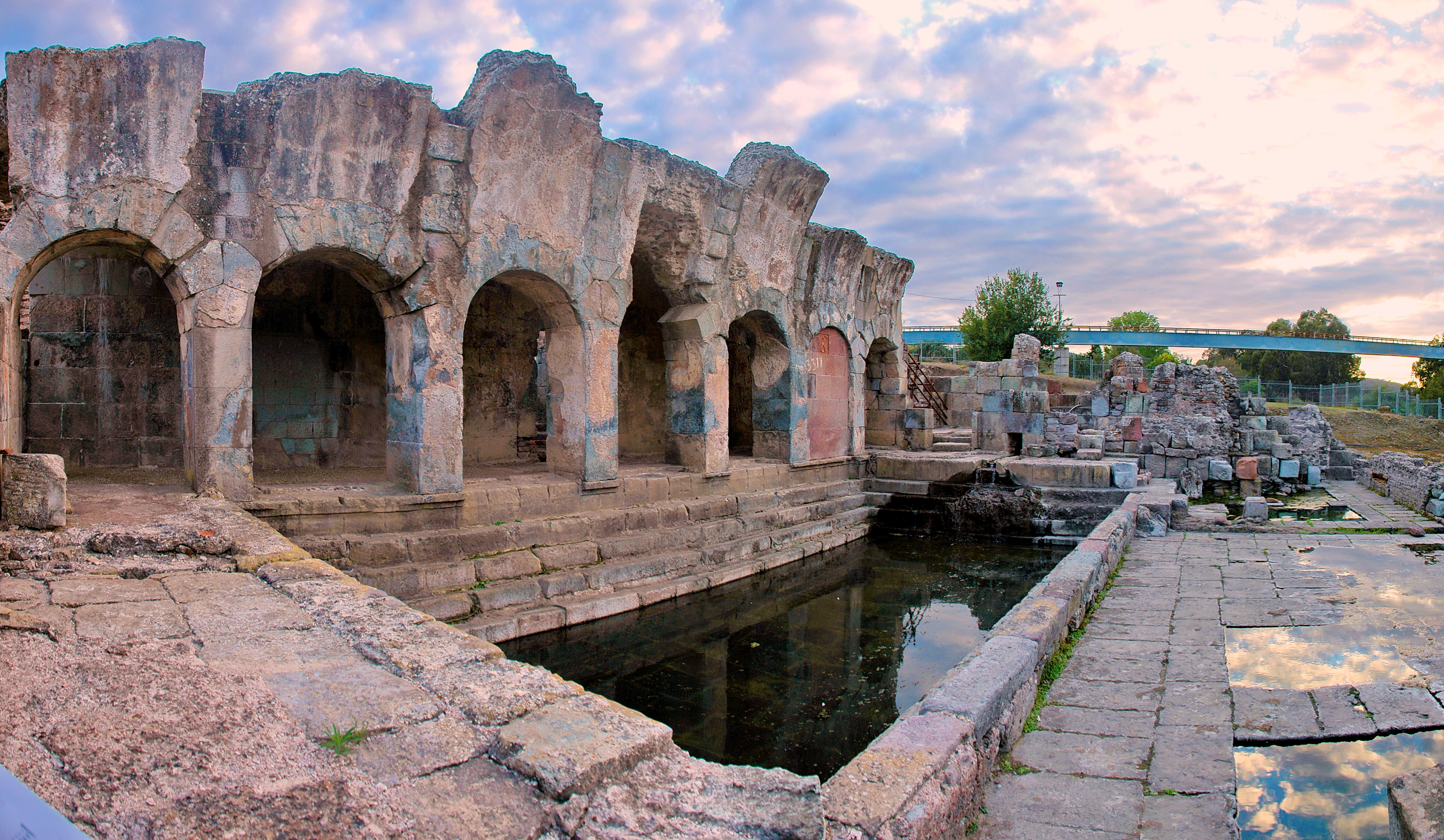
Thermae of Forum Traiani

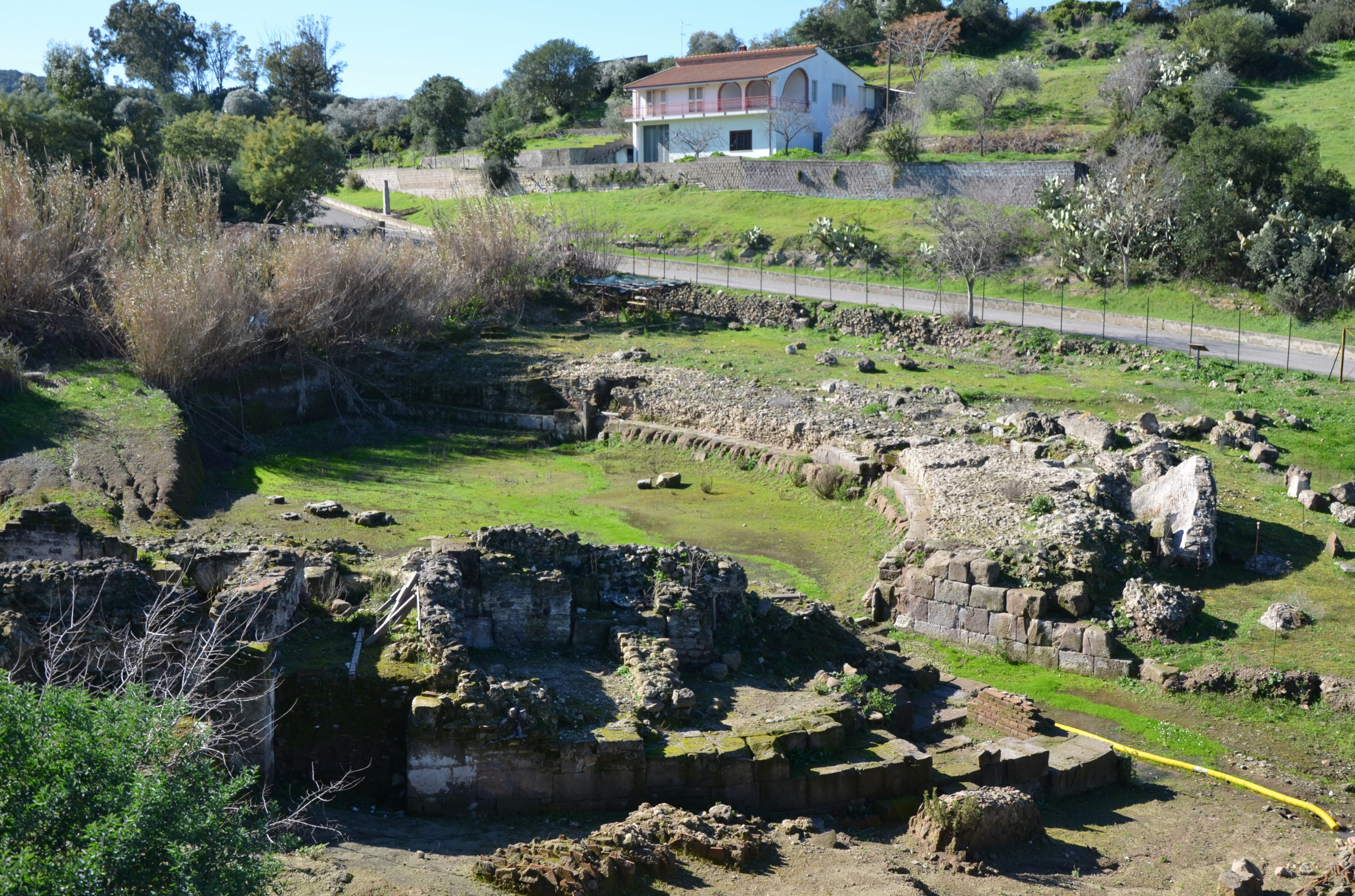
Roman amphitheatre

In antiquity, Fordongianus was called Forum Trajani in honor of Roman emperor Trajan, who is credited with the building of what are now considerable Roman remains, including those of a bridge, and of thermae on a scale of great magnificence (Valéry, Voy. en Sardaigne, vol. ii. c. 35). The city, in the interior of Sardinia, is known from the Itineraries, which place it on the road from Tibula, through the interior of the island, to Othoca. (Itin. Ant. p. 82.) Fordongianus sits on the left bank of the river Tirsi (ancient Thyrsus), about 25 kilometres (16 mi) from Oristano.

== Demographic evolution ==
Historical population

Year	Pop.	±%
1861	1,137	—
1871	1,249	+9.9%
1881	1,268	+1.5%
1901	1,309	+3.2%
1911	1,322	+1.0%

Year	Pop.	±%
1921	1,325	+0.2%
1931	1,408	+6.3%
1936	1,427	+1.3%
1951	1,671	+17.1%
1961	1,623	−2.9%

Year	Pop.	±%
1971	1,444	−11.0%
1981	1,296	−10.2%
1991	1,176	−9.3%
2001	1,057	−10.1%

Source: Data from ISTAT
