= Strada statale 131 Diramazione Centrale Nuorese =

State highway in Italy

State Highway 131 Nuoro Central Branch
- Strada statale 131; Diramazione Centrale Nuorese
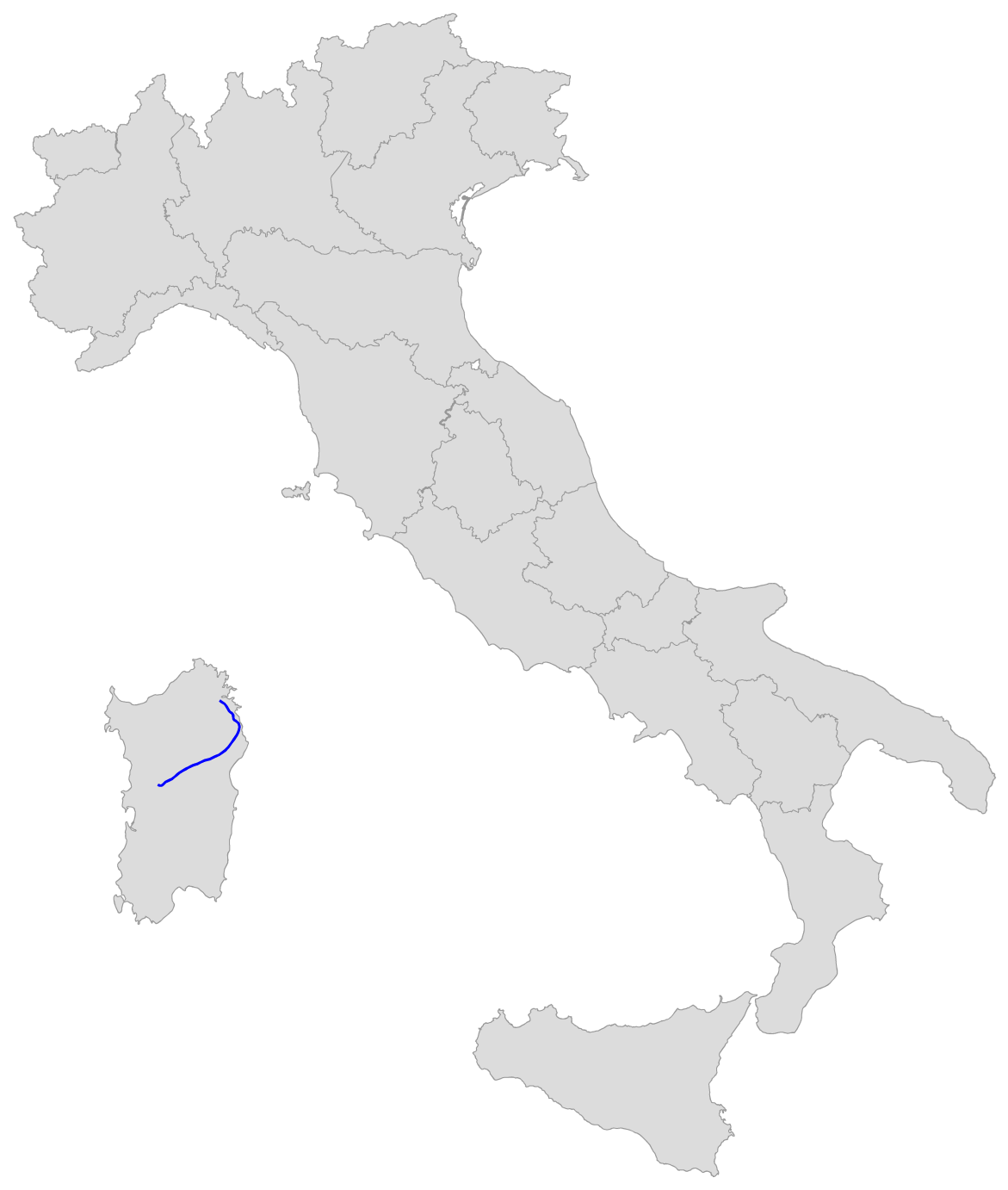

Route information
- Maintained by ANAS
- Length: 144.0 km (89.5 mi)
- Existed: 1972–present

Major junctions
- From: Abbasanta
- SS 131
- To: Olbia

Location
- Country: Italy
- Regions: Sardinia
- Major cities: Nuoro, Olbia

Highway system
- Roads in Italy; Autostrade; State; Regional; Provincial; Municipal
← SS 131	→ SS 132

The strada statale 131 Diramazione Centrale Nuorese (SS 131 DCN) is an Italian state highway 144.0 kilometres (89.5 mi) long in Italy located in the region of Sardinia. This freeway is connected to the Strada statale 131 Carlo Felice, it links Abbasanta (a village near Oristano) with Olbia, via Nuoro, crossing the hinterland mountainous regions of the island.

== Route ==
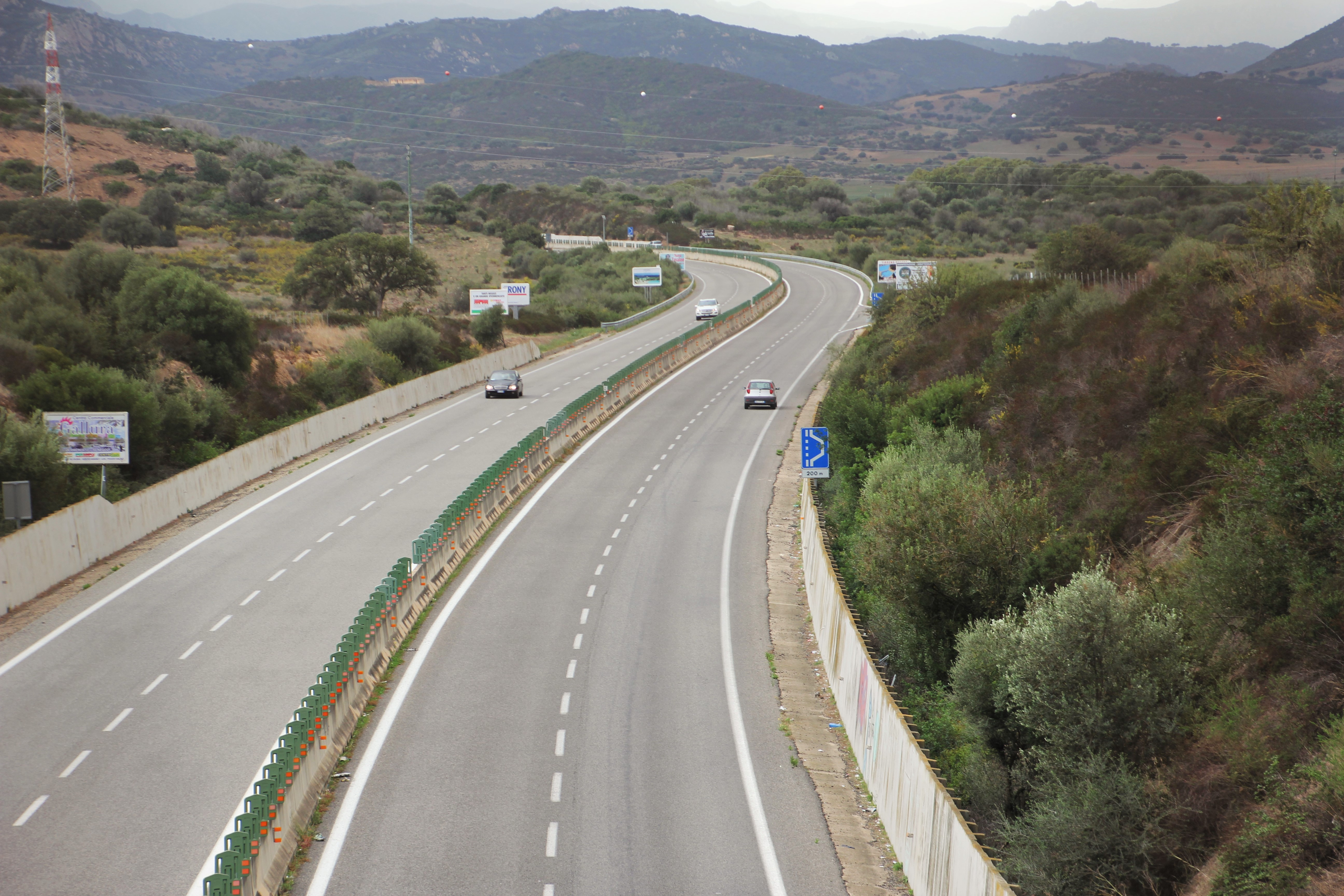
The SS 131 DCN in Olbia

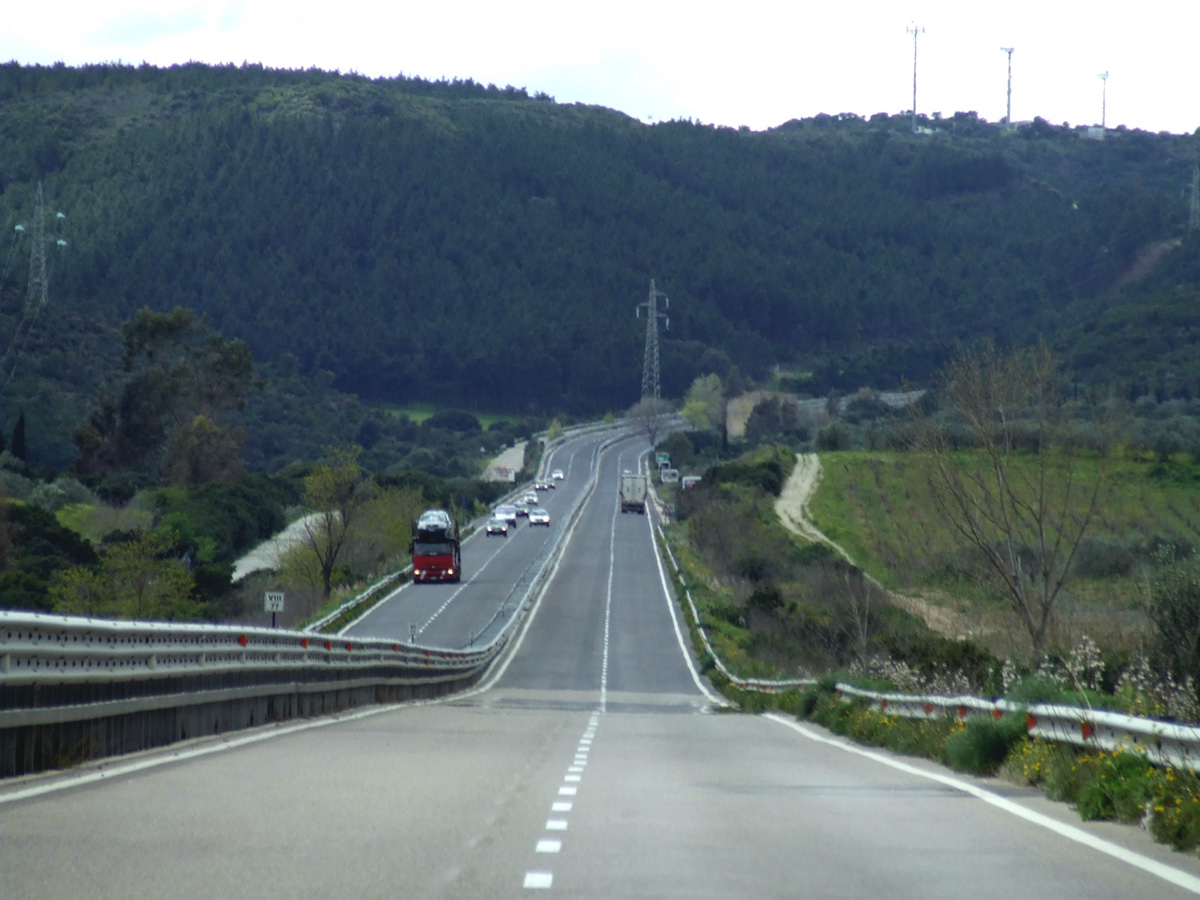
The SS 131 DCN in Loculi

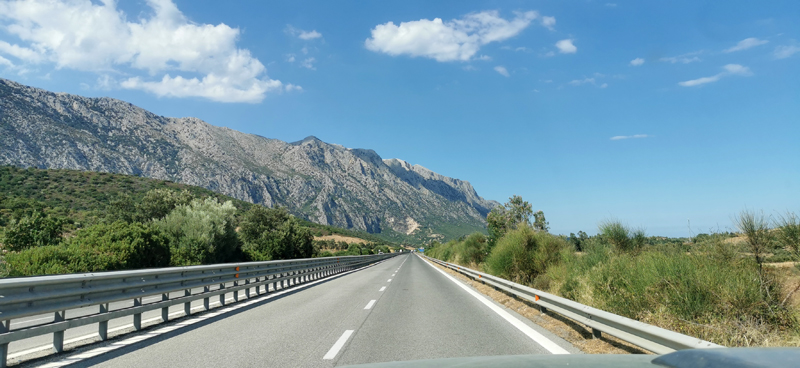
The SS 131 DCN in Lula

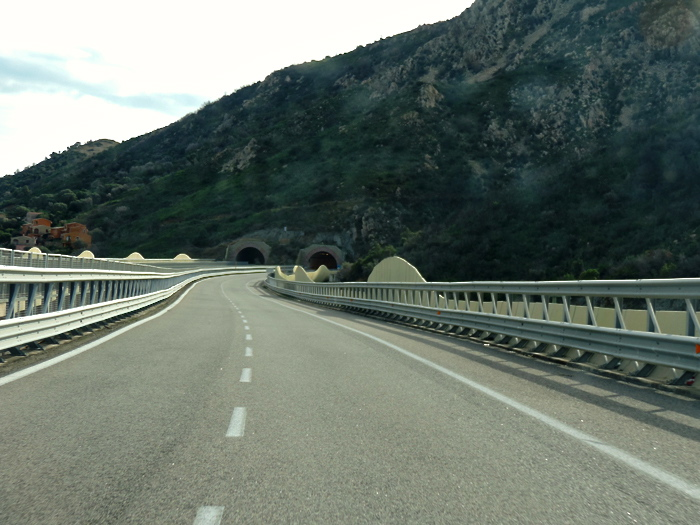
The SS 131 DCN in Abbasanta

Exit	↓km↓	Province
Carlo Felice; Cagliari - Sassari	0.0 km (0 mi)	OR
Sassari	0.1 km (0.062 mi)	OR
Abbasanta - Ghilarza - Fordongianus - Sassari - Nuraghe Losa	1.7 km (1.1 mi)	OR
Ghilarza - Sorradile - Nughedu Santa Vittoria - Ardauli - Lake Omodeo	4.8 km (3.0 mi)	OR
Aidomaggiore	8.9 km (5.5 mi)	OR
Lake Omodeo	10.7 km (6.6 mi)	OR
Sedilo Sud	13.3 km (8.3 mi)	OR
Sedilo Nord	15.2 km (9.4 mi)	OR
Olzai - Teti - Nughedu Santa Vittoria	19.8 km (12.3 mi)	OR
Ottana - Bolotana - Sarule - Gavoi	26.1 km (16.2 mi)	NU
di Ghilarza; Orotelli - Orani	31.7 km (19.7 mi)	NU
Orotelli	38.0 km (23.6 mi)	NU
Centrale Sarda; Oniferi - Orani - Macomer	40.1 km (24.9 mi)	NU
Trasversale Sarda; Macomer - Sassari	42.1 km (26.2 mi)	NU
di Buddusò e del Correboi; Nuoro - Tortolì	50.1 km (31.1 mi)	NU
Nuoro La Solitudine - Lollove - Orune	60.8 km (37.8 mi)	NU
Lula - Bitti - Galtellì - Dorgali - Orosei	70.3 km (43.7 mi)	NU
Siniscola - Lodè	93.5 km (58.1 mi)	NU
Orientale Sarda; Siniscola - Orosei	98.1 km (61.0 mi)	NU
Posada - Torpè - Lodè	103.4 km (64.2 mi)	NU
Orientale Sarda; Posada - Budoni	104.5 km (64.9 mi)	NU
Orientale Sarda; Budoni	111.3 km (69.2 mi)	SS
Orientale Sarda; Budoni - Agrustos	115.5 km (71.8 mi)	SS
San Teodoro	122.3 km (76.0 mi)	SS
Padru - Ovilò	129.7 km (80.6 mi)	SS
Vaccileddi - Santa Giusta - Porto San Paolo - La Castagna	131.4 km (81.6 mi)	SS
Porto San Paolo - Trudda - Loiri - La Castagna	136.1 km (84.6 mi)	SS
Olbia; Olbia Costa Smeralda Airport - Port of Olbia	143.5 km (89.2 mi)	SS
Sassari-Olbia; Sassari	144.0 km (89.5 mi)	SS

== See also ==
- State highways (Italy)
- Roads in Italy
- Transport in Italy

=== Other Italian roads ===
- Autostrade of Italy
- Regional road (Italy)
- Provincial road (Italy)
- Municipal road (Italy)
