= Lakes of Sardinia =

Natural and artificial lakes in Sardinia

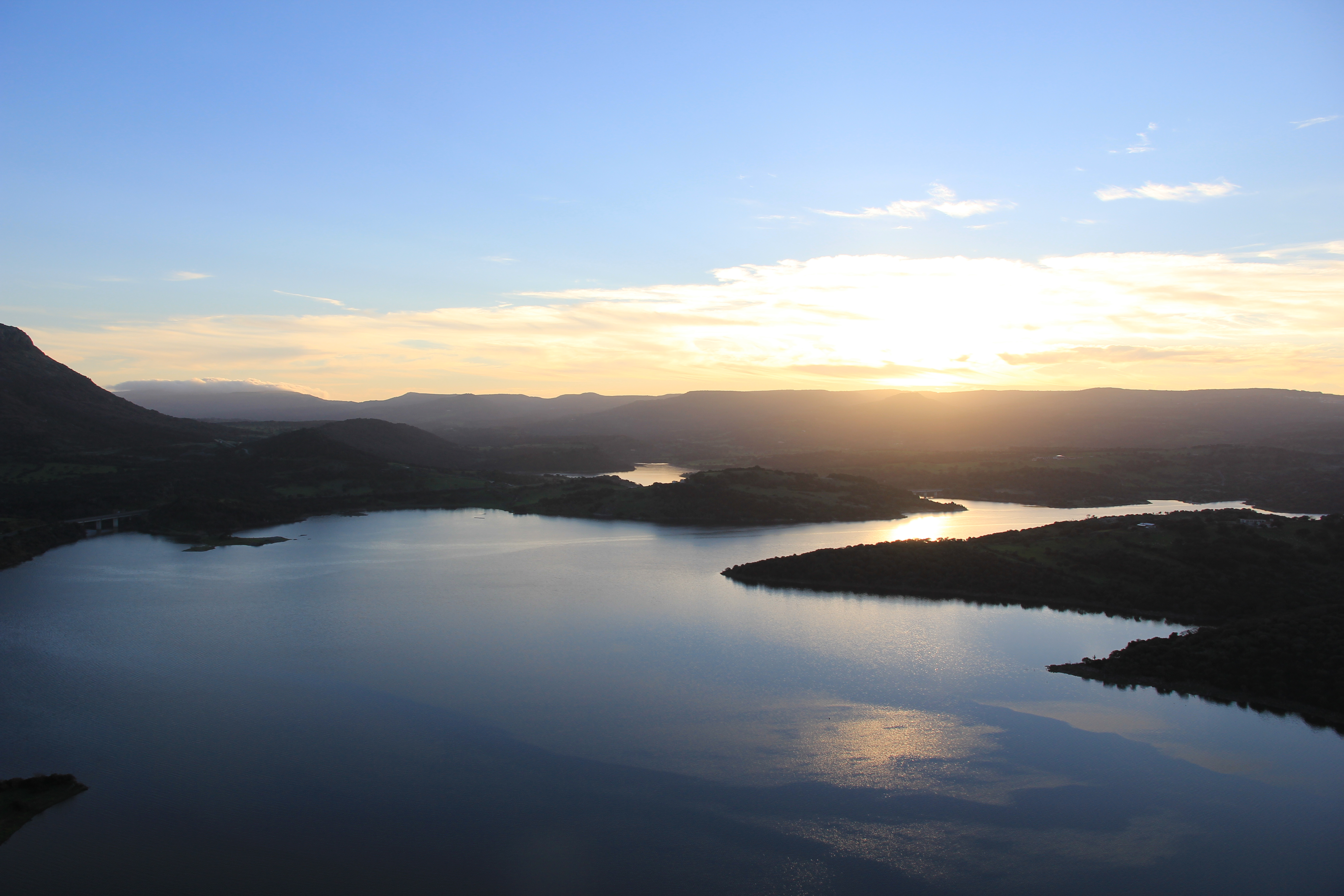
The lake of the upper Temo near Monteleone Rocca Doria.

The Lakes of Sardinia are, for the most part, artificial lakes. The only natural lake on the island is Lake Baratz, located in the Nurra of Sassari. A special case is represented by some temporary lakes of a seasonal nature, very small in size and fed by rainwater, which is called paùli. An example is the two Paùli Maiori of the Giara di Tuili.

The most important lakes in Sardinia are Lake Omodeo, formed by damming the Tirso River, Lake Coghinas, on the river of the same name, and the lakes of high and low Flumendosa.

== The natural lakes ==
The only large, freshwater natural lake on the island is Lake Baratz, which originated as a result of the formation of a cordon of dunes that prevented the outflow of fresh water to the sea. The lake is small and is fed only by water from its catchment area. Its shores have a development of about 12 kilometers.

The paùli, on the other hand, are small lakes originating from the filling of depressions in the ground by rainwater. The largest ones develop in the basaltic plateau of the Giara and have, for the most part, a temporary duration limited to the period between autumn and spring. A few larger ones can hold water for a longer period, which may extend to the whole year. They are characterized by a shallow depth, rarely exceeding one meter.

== The artificial lakes ==
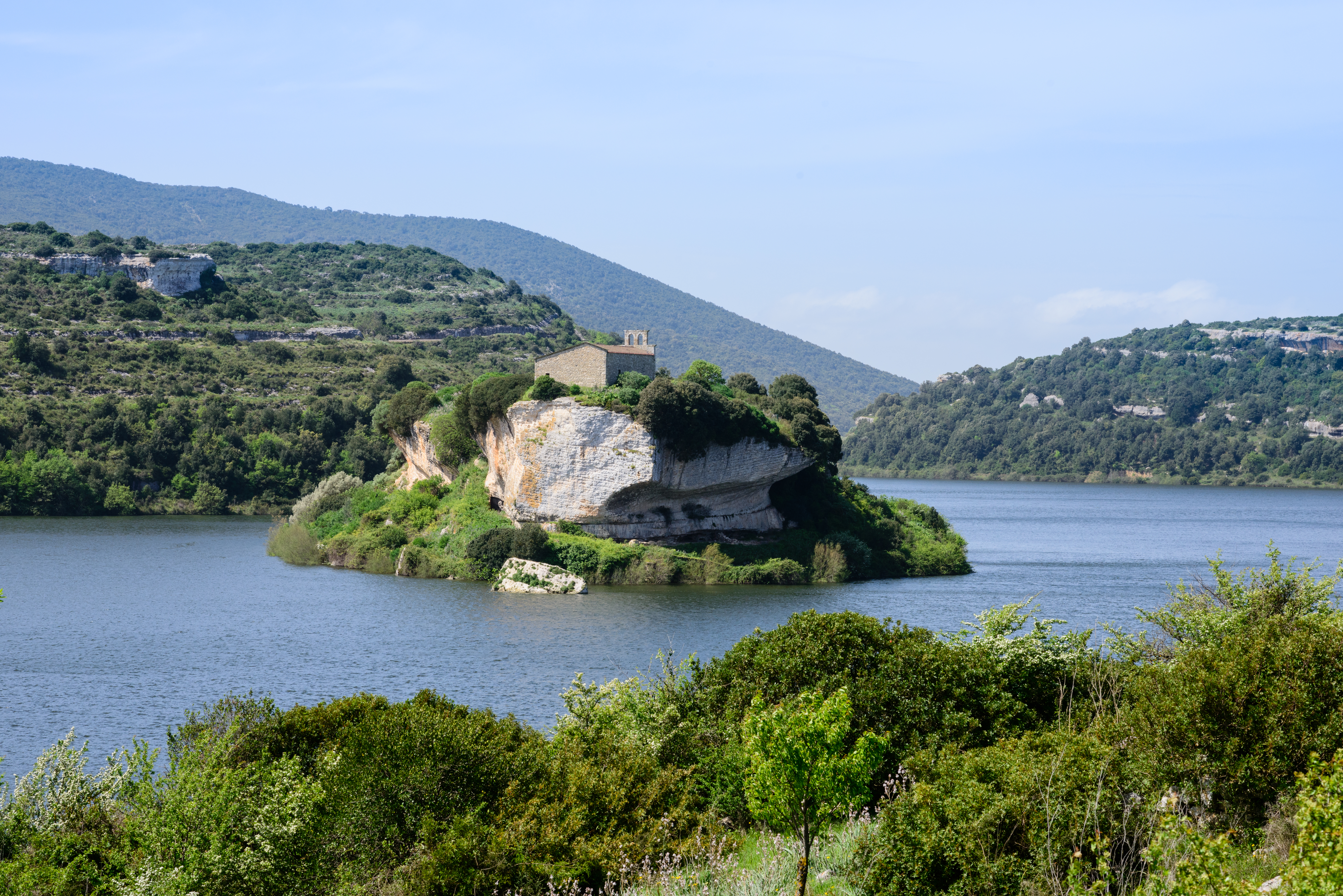
Lake Is Barroccus with the islet in the center where the church of San Sebastiano is located in Isili

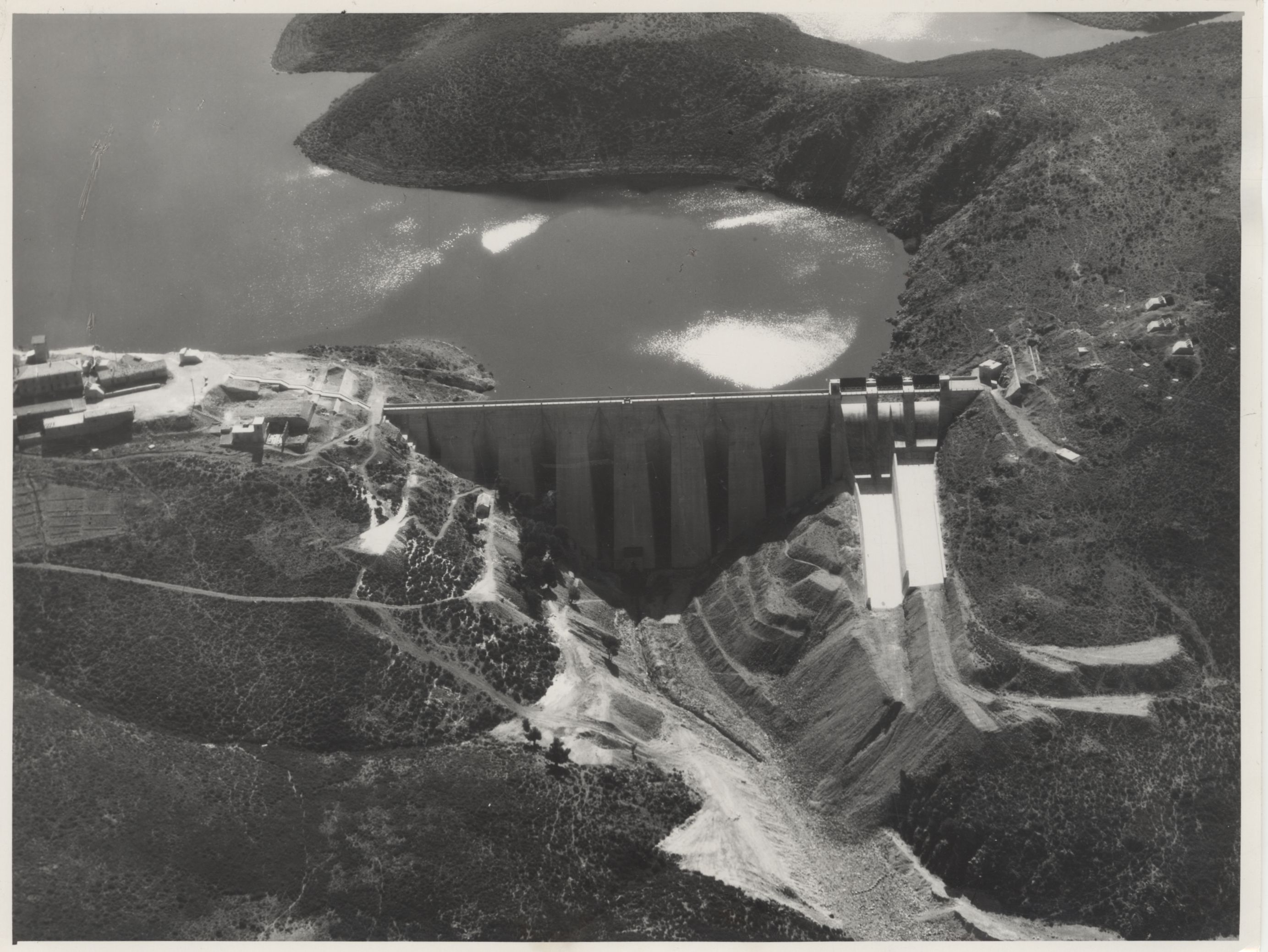
The Bau Muggeris dam on the Flumendosa River. Photo from 1969 from the Historical Archives of the Italian Touring Club.

There are 38 artificial reservoirs in Sardinia, whose total volume amounts to 1.6 billion cubic meters of water. The artificial lakes are as follows:

- Lake Bau e Mela
- Lake Loiri
- Lake Sant'Antonio
- Lake Bau Mandara
- Lake Sinnai
- Lake Bunnari
- Lake Corongiu
- Lake Monteponi
- Lake Benzone
- Lake Flumineddu
- Lake Sa Forada
- Lake Surigheddu
- Lake Govossai
- Lake Torrei
- Lake Sos Canales
- Lake Casteldoria
- Lake Bau Pressiu
- Lake Bidighinzu
- Lake Punta Gennarta
- Lake Is Barroccus
- Lake Cucchinadorza
- Lake Casteddu
- Lake Cuga
- Lake Leni
- Lake Coxinas
- Lake Posada
- Lake Simbirizzi
- Lake Cedrino
- Lake Cixerri
- Lake Bau Muggeris (or the Upper Flumendosa)
- Lake Gusana
- Lake Monte Pranu
- Lake of Pattada
- Lake Monteleone (or of the Temo)
- Lake Liscia
- Lake Omodeo
- Lake Coghinas
- Lake Basso del Flumendosa
- Lake Mulargia

== Bibliography ==
- Camarada, Ignazio; Cossu, Andrea (1988). Guida a dodici aree di rilevante interesse botanico, Sassari [A guide to twelve areas of outstanding botanical interest, Sassari] (PDF) (in Italian). Carlo Delfino.
- Camarda, Ignazio; Falchi, Sabina; Nudda, Graziano (1998). Corpi idrici artificiali, in L'ambiente naturale in Sardegna, Sassari [Artificial water bodies, in The Natural Environment in Sardinia, Sassari] (in Italian). Carlo Delfino. pp. 395–411. ISBN 88-7138-131-9.
- Sechi, Nicola (1986). "Il Problema dell'eutrofizzazione dei laghi: la situazione trofica degli invasi della Sardegna" [The Problem of Lake Eutrophication: the trophic situation of Sardinia's reservoirs]. Bollettino della Società Sarda di Scienze Naturali (in Italian). 25.
