= Bidonì =

Bidonì Bidoniu (Sardinian)
- Comune
- Comune di Bidonì
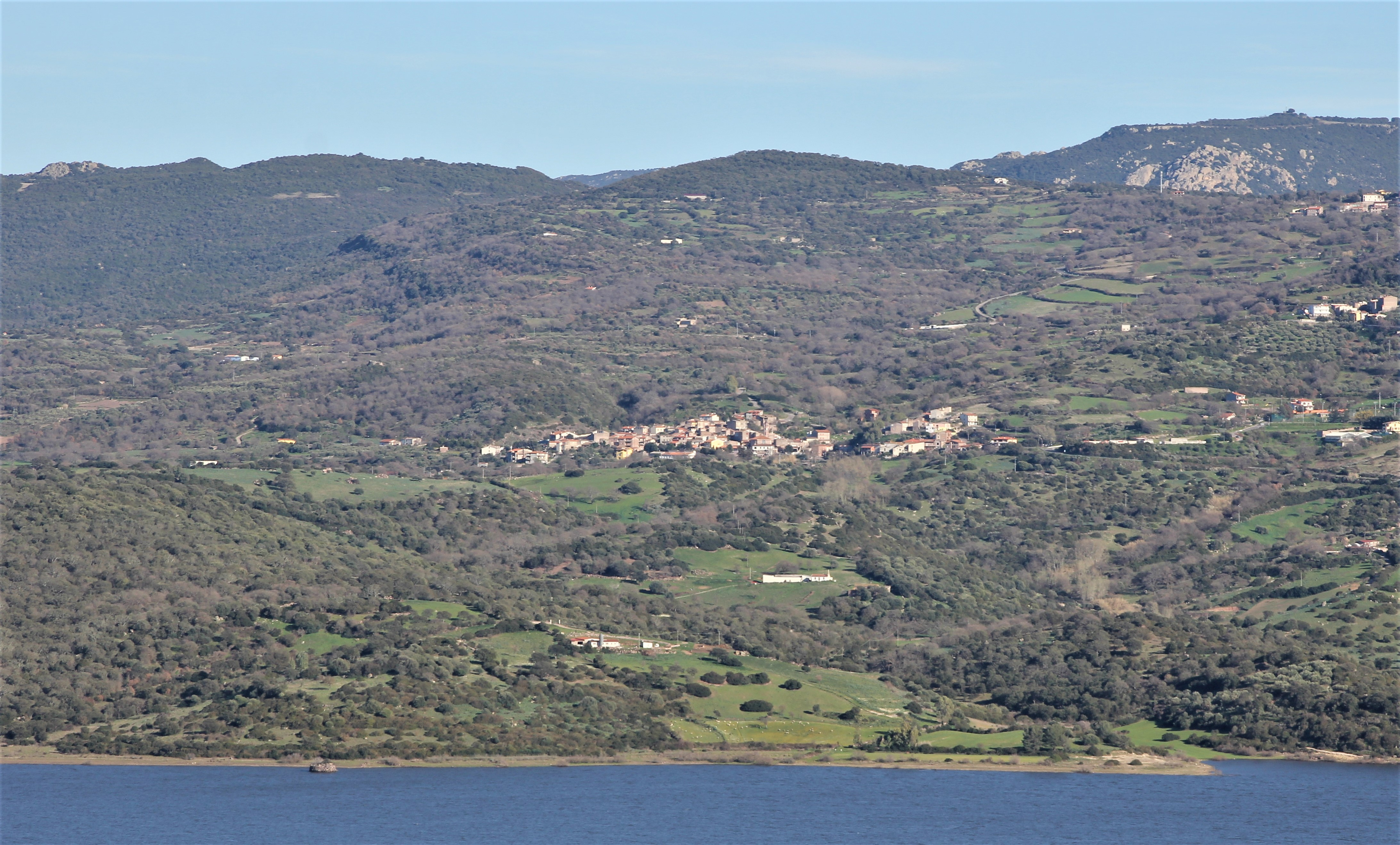
- View of Bidoni from the Tirso river

- Location within Sardinia
- Coordinates: 40°7′N 8°56′E
- Country: Italy
- Region: Sardinia
- Province: Oristano (OR)

Government
  - Mayor: Ilaria Sedda

Area
  - Total: 11.72 km^{2} (4.53 sq mi)
- Elevation: 250 m (820 ft)

Population (2026)
  - Total: 112
  - Density: 9.56/km^{2} (24.8/sq mi)
- Demonym: Bidonesi
- Time zone: UTC+1 (CET)
  - Summer (DST): UTC+2 (CEST)
- Postal code: 09080
- Dialing code: 0783
- Website: Official website

Bidonì (Sardinian: Bidoniu) is a village and comune (municipality) in the Province of Oristano in the autonomous island region of Sardinia in Italy, located about 100 kilometres (62 mi) north of Cagliari and about 40 kilometres (25 mi) northeast of Oristano. It has 112 inhabitants.

Bidonì borders the municipalities of Ghilarza, Nughedu Santa Vittoria, Sedilo, and Sorradile, and lies by the Tirso river.

== Demographics ==
As of 2026, the population is 112, of which 52.7% are male, and 47.3% are female. Minors make up 10.7% of the population, and seniors make up 35.7%.

Historical population

Year	Pop.	±%
1861	319	—
1871	337	+5.6%
1881	393	+16.6%
1901	383	−2.5%
1911	377	−1.6%
1921	379	+0.5%
1931	397	+4.7%
1936	379	−4.5%

Year	Pop.	±%
1951	403	+6.3%
1961	400	−0.7%
1971	287	−28.2%
1981	246	−14.3%
1991	188	−23.6%
2001	159	−15.4%
2011	147	−7.5%
2021	128	−12.9%

Source: ISTAT

=== Immigraition ===
As of 2025, of the known countries of birth of 116 residents, the most numerous are: Italy (113 – 97.4%) and Germany (3 – 2.6%).
