= Liscia (river) =

River in France

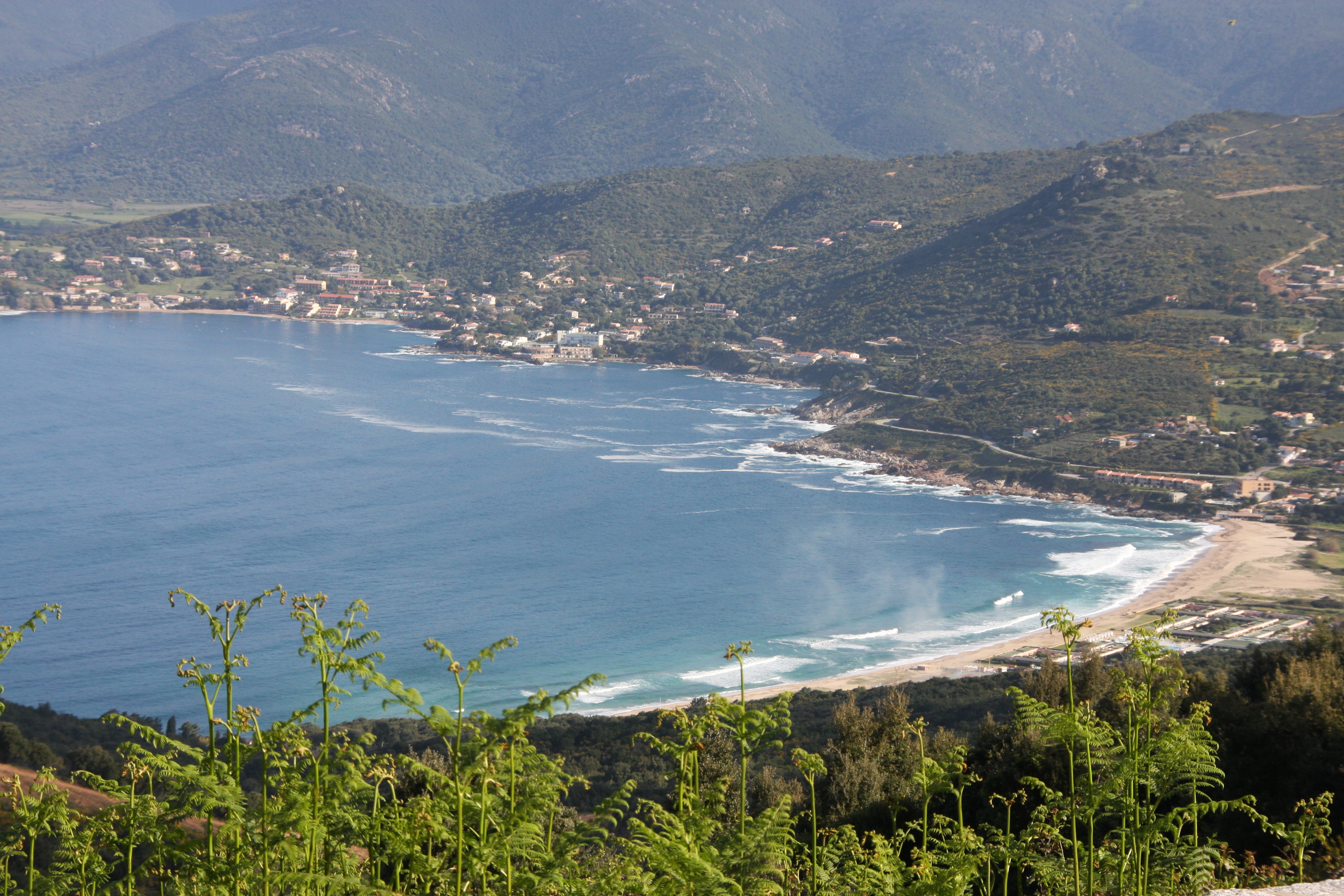
- Stagnone beach - on the right - in Calcatoggio with the mouth of the Liscia north of the sandy part

- Location within Corsica Location within France
- Native name: Fleuve a Liscia (French)

Location
- Country: France
- Region: Corsica
- Department: Corse-du-Sud

Physical characteristics
- Mouth: Mediterranean Sea
  - coordinates: 42.0502°N 8.747°E
- Length: 12.87 kilometres (8.00 mi)

The Liscia (French: Fleuve a Liscia) is a coastal river in the west of the department of Corse-du-Sud, Corsica, France.

== Course ==
The Liscia is 12.87 kilometres (8.00 mi) long. It crosses the communes of Calcatoggio, Cannelle, Sari-d'Orcino and Sant'Andréa-d'Orcino. It rises in the commune of Sari-d'Orcino to the west of the 1,243 metres (4,078 ft) Punta Sant'Eliseu. The source is at an altitude of 1,168 metres (3,832 ft). The river flows west past the villages of Sari-d'Orcino, Cannelle and Sant'Andréa d'Orcino. It enters the sea at the north end of the Plage de Stagnone to the south of Masorchia.

== Valley ==
The Liscia valley is one of the three watersheds in the Liamone landscape, an area of Corsica. The others are the Liamone and the Sagone valleys. These have created a large alluvial plain along the coast. The Liscia valley covers most of the region called Cinarca. The 15th century Genoese Chronicles of Giovanni della Grossa (1388–1464) relate that the mythical Count Ugo Colonna arrived in the country that would later be called Cinarca. He saw a beautiful mound covered with wild olive trees, and this place seemed so beautiful to him that he decided to build a castle for his youngest son named Cinarco. This castle was then named Cinarcaé.

The valley opens onto the Gulf of Liscia. The coastline of the gulf is bounded by the Punta Capigliolo and Punta di Palmentoju, both with a Genoese tower. It is largely built up along the sea on both sides of the RD81 coastal road. There are many summer visitors to the small coves to the north of Tiuccia and to the large Plage de Stagnone.

The Liscia basin has gentle slopes, with many smaller valleys dug by streams that converge on the small coastal river. The micro-region is called one of the gardens of Corsica because of the variety and abundance of terraced crops. There are meadows and market gardens below the villages, olive groves and orchards around them, and vineyards and pastures above. The ancient villages of Calcatoggio, Sant'Andrea d'orcino, Cannelle, Sari d'orcino and Casaglione are architecturally coherent and blend into the landscape.

== Tributaries ==
The following streams (ruisseaux) are tributaries of the Liscia (ordered by length) and sub-tributaries:

- Pianella: 6 km (3.7 mi)
  - l'Ondella: 3 km (1.9 mi)
    - Cagna: 2 km (1.2 mi)
  - Villana: 3 km (1.9 mi)
    - Calivella: 1 km (0.62 mi)
  - Toia: 3 km (1.9 mi)
  - Fiurellu: 2 km (1.2 mi)
  - Ruli: 2 km (1.2 mi)
- Mulinellu: 5 km (3.1 mi)
  - Aghialza: 2 km (1.2 mi)
  - Fiuminale: 2 km (1.2 mi)
- Traja: 3 km (1.9 mi)
- Piandove: 3 km (1.9 mi)
- Carbonaja: 2 km (1.2 mi)
- Pratalina: 2 km (1.2 mi)

== Sources ==
- "Fleuve a Liscia", Sandre (in French)
- "Liamone – 3.15", Atlas des paysages de la Region Corse (PDF) (in French), Direction régionale de l’environnement, de l’aménagement et du logement Corse
- "Relation: Fleuve a Liscia (9337130)", OpenStreetMap
