= Soddì =

- Comune
- Comune di Soddì
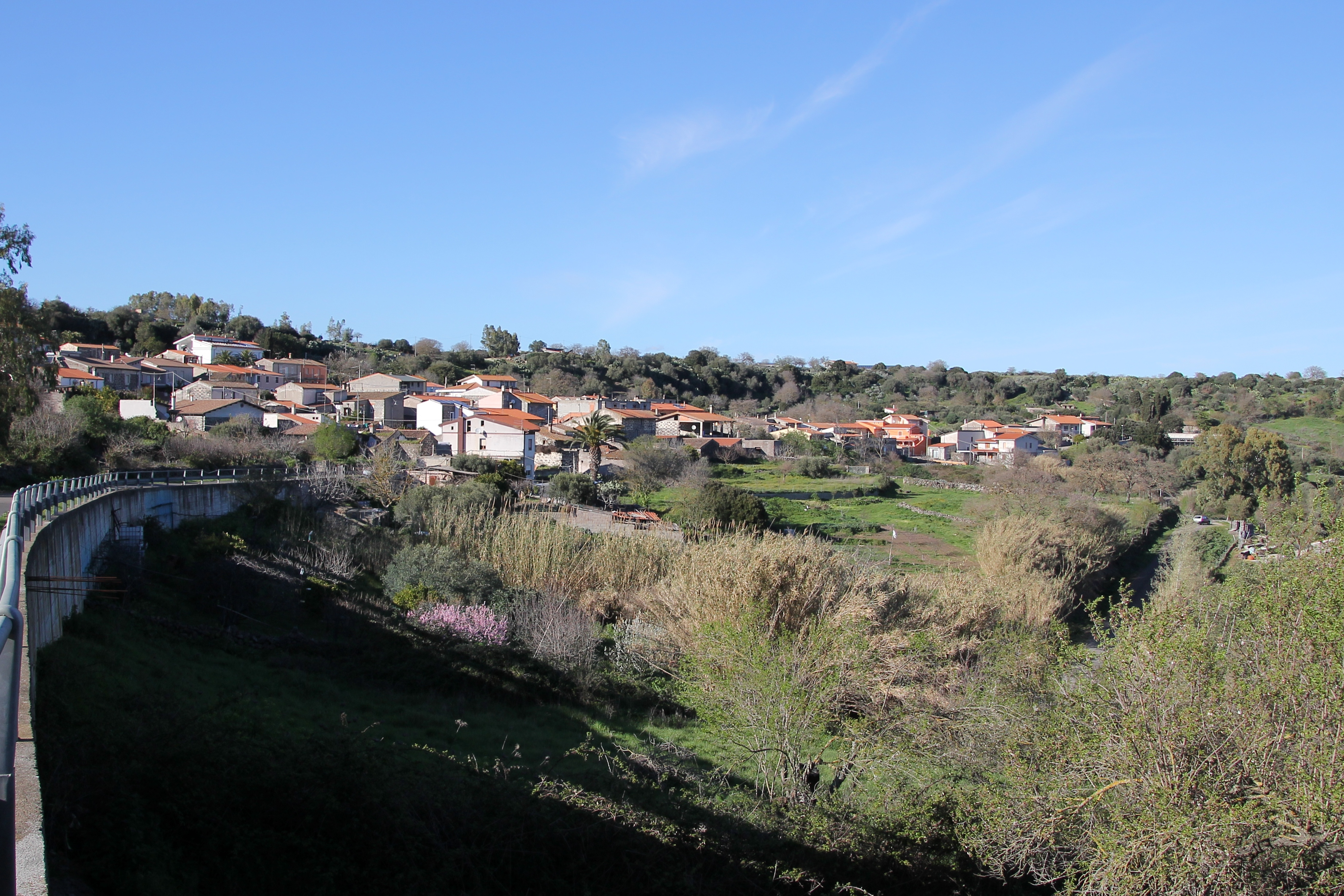

- Location within Sardinia
- Coordinates: 40°8′N 8°53′E
- Country: Italy
- Region: Sardinia
- Province: Province of Oristano (OR)

Area
  - Total: 5.4 km^{2} (2.1 sq mi)

Population (Dec. 2004)
  - Total: 137
  - Density: 25/km^{2} (66/sq mi)
- Time zone: UTC+1 (CET)
  - Summer (DST): UTC+2 (CEST)
- Postal code: 09080
- Dialing code: 0785

Soddì is a comune (municipality) in the Province of Oristano in the Italian region Sardinia, located about 100 kilometres (62 mi) north of Cagliari and about 35 kilometres (22 mi) northeast of Oristano. As of 31 December 2004, it had a population of 137 and an area of 5.4 square kilometres (2.1 mi^{2}).

Soddì borders the following municipalities: Aidomaggiore, Boroneddu, Ghilarza.

== Demographic evolution ==
Historical population

Year	Pop.	±%
1861	254	—
1871	248	−2.4%
1881	260	+4.8%
1901	230	−11.5%
1911	258	+12.2%

Year	Pop.	±%
1921	231	−10.5%
1931	286	+23.8%
1936	300	+4.9%
1951	303	+1.0%
1961	266	−12.2%

Year	Pop.	±%
1971	209	−21.4%
1981	200	−4.3%
1991	184	−8.0%
2001	142	−22.8%

Source: Data from ISTAT
