= Aidomaggiore =

Aidomaggiore Aidumajore
- Comune
- Comune di Aidomaggiore
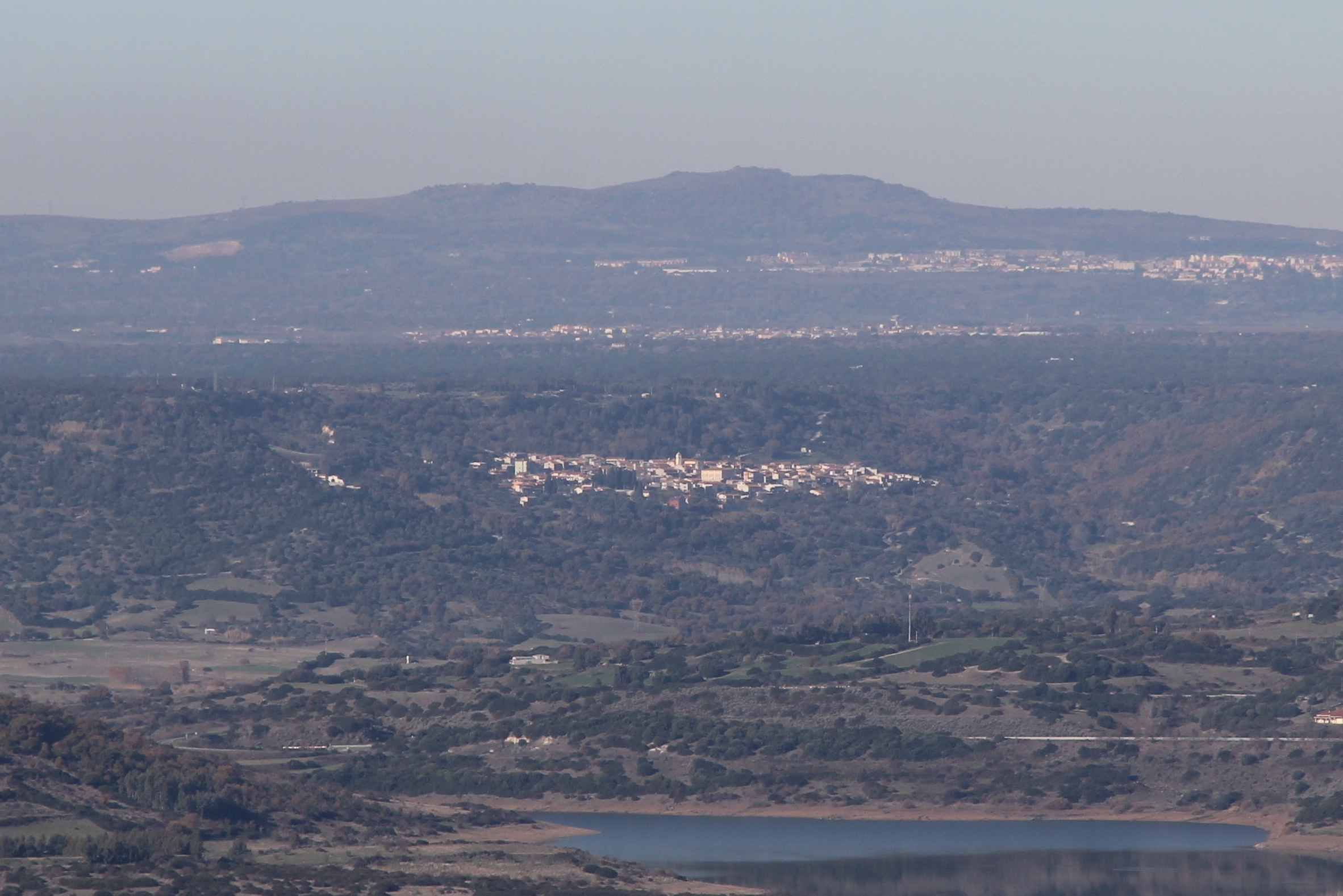
- Aidomaggiore and the lake Omodeo

- Coat of arms

- Location of Aidomaggiore in Sardinia
- Coordinates: 40°10′N 8°51′E
- Country: Italy
- Region: Sardinia
- Province: Oristano

Government
  - Mayor: Mariano Salaris

Area
  - Total: 41.21 km^{2} (15.91 sq mi)
- Elevation: 250 m (820 ft)

Population (2026)
  - Total: 374
  - Density: 9.08/km^{2} (23.5/sq mi)
- Demonyms: Aidomaggioresi; Aidumajoresos
- Time zone: UTC+1 (CET)
  - Summer (DST): UTC+2 (CEST)
- Postal code: 09070
- Dialing code: 0785
- Website: Official website

Aidomaggiore (Sardinian: Aidumajore) is a village and comune (municipality) in the Province of Oristano in the autonomous island region of Sardinia in Italy. Aidomaggiore is located about 110 kilometres (68 mi) north of Cagliari and about 35 kilometres (22 mi) northeast of Oristano. It has 374 inhabitants.

Aidomaggiore borders the municipalities of Borore, Dualchi, Ghilarza, Norbello, Sedilo, and Soddì.

== Demographics ==
As of 2026, the population is 374, of which 49.5% are male, and 50.5% are female. Minors make up 12.6% of the population, and seniors make up 34%.

Historical population

Year	Pop.	±%
1861	1,089	—
1871	1,057	−2.9%
1881	1,053	−0.4%
1901	1,045	−0.8%
1911	982	−6.0%
1921	911	−7.2%
1931	950	+4.3%
1936	966	+1.7%

Year	Pop.	±%
1951	1,002	+3.7%
1961	910	−9.2%
1971	734	−19.3%
1981	668	−9.0%
1991	617	−7.6%
2001	542	−12.2%
2011	472	−12.9%
2021	398	−15.7%

Source: ISTAT

=== Immigration ===
As of 2025, of the known countries of birth of 374 residents, the most numerous are: Italy (351 – 93.9%), Morocco (11 – 2.9%), Romania (6 – 1.6%).
