= Tadasuni =

Tadasuni Tadasune
- Comune
- Comune di Tadasuni
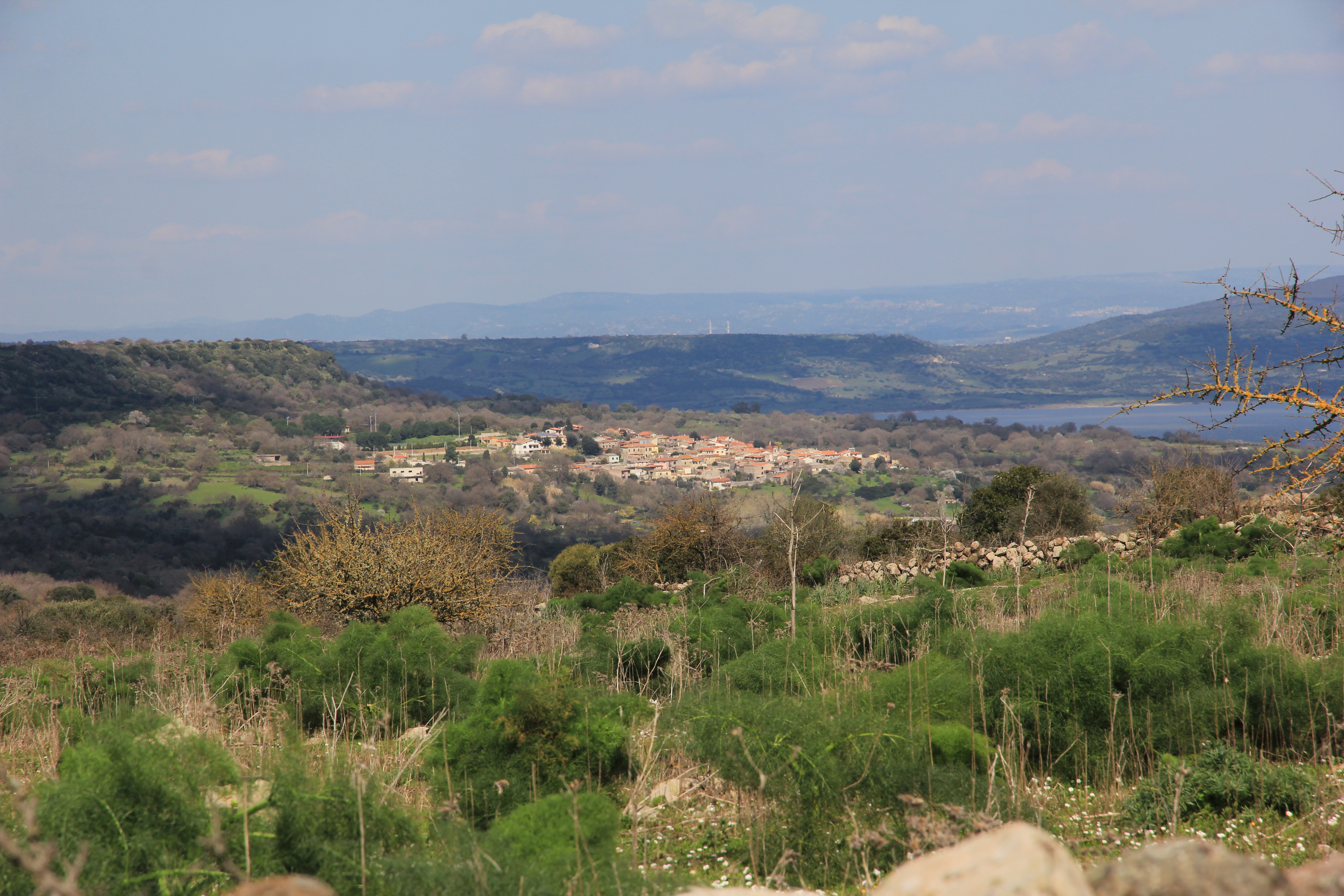

- Location within Sardinia
- Coordinates: 40°7′N 8°53′E
- Country: Italy
- Region: Sardinia
- Province: Province of Oristano (OR)

Area
  - Total: 4.6 km^{2} (1.8 sq mi)
- Elevation: 180 m (590 ft)

Population (Dec. 2004)
  - Total: 187
  - Density: 41/km^{2} (110/sq mi)
- Demonym: Tadasunesi
- Time zone: UTC+1 (CET)
  - Summer (DST): UTC+2 (CEST)
- Postal code: 09080
- Dialing code: 0785
- Website: Official website

Tadasuni is a comune (municipality) in the Province of Oristano in the Italian region Sardinia, located about 100 kilometres (62 mi) north of Cagliari and about 35 kilometres (22 mi) northeast of Oristano. As of 31 December 2004, it had a population of 187 and an area of 4.6 square kilometres (1.8 mi^{2}).

Tadasuni borders the following municipalities: Ardauli, Boroneddu, Ghilarza, Sorradile.

== Demographic evolution ==
Historical population

Year	Pop.	±%
1861	332	—
1871	386	+16.3%
1881	381	−1.3%
1901	368	−3.4%
1911	402	+9.2%

Year	Pop.	±%
1921	386	−4.0%
1931	432	+11.9%
1936	440	+1.9%
1951	416	−5.5%
1961	389	−6.5%

Year	Pop.	±%
1971	295	−24.2%
1981	258	−12.5%
1991	216	−16.3%
2001	198	−8.3%

Source: Data from ISTAT
