= Boroneddu =

- Comune
- Comune di Boroneddu
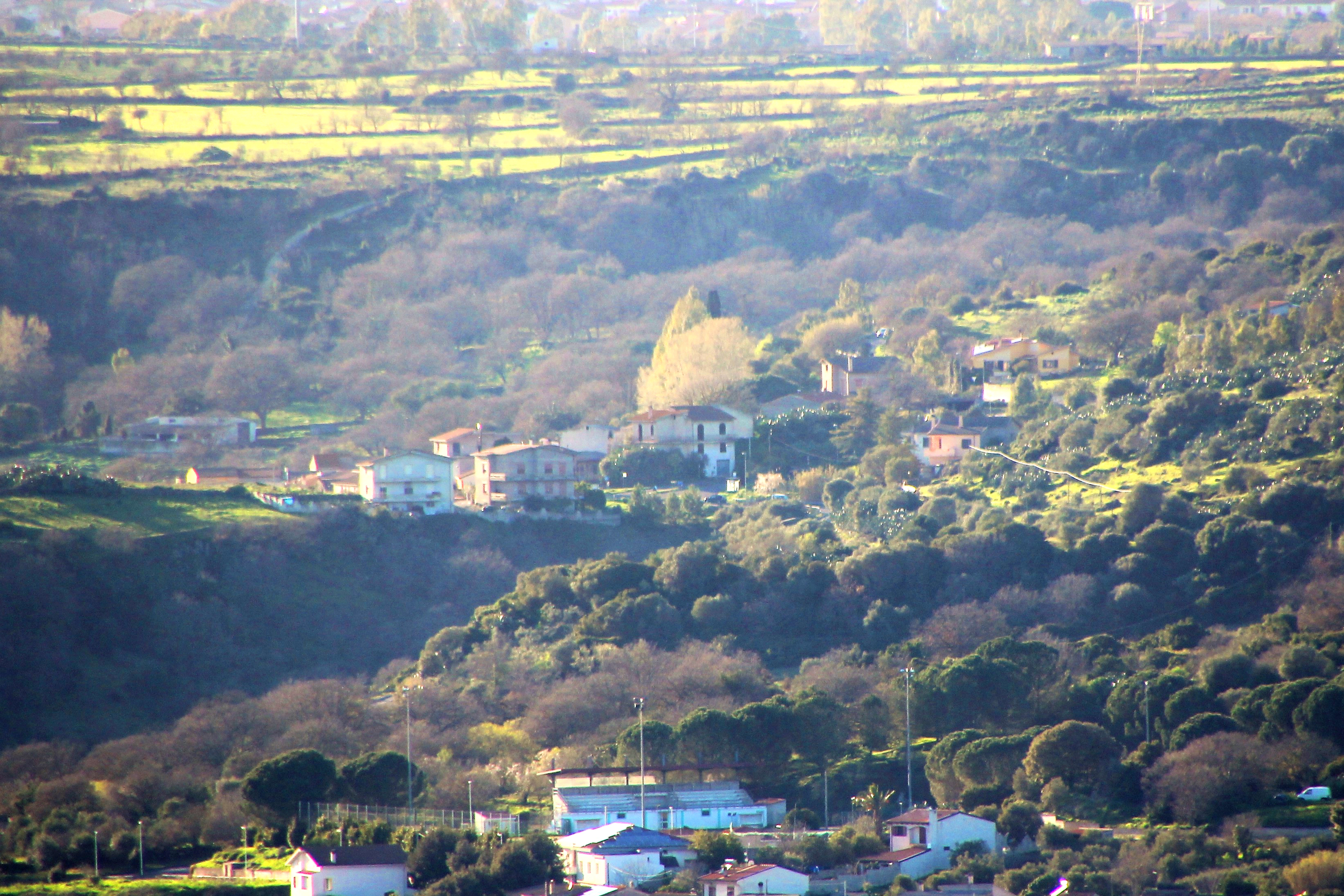

- Location within Sardinia
- Coordinates: 40°7′N 8°52′E
- Country: Italy
- Region: Sardinia
- Province: Province of Oristano (OR)

Area
  - Total: 4.59 km^{2} (1.77 sq mi)

Population (2026)
  - Total: 135
  - Density: 29.4/km^{2} (76.2/sq mi)
- Demonym(s): Bonoreddesos; Bonoreddesi
- Time zone: UTC+1 (CET)
  - Summer (DST): UTC+2 (CEST)
- Postal code: 09080
- Dialing code: 0785

Boroneddu is a village and comune (municipality) in the Province of Oristano in the autonomous island region of Sardinia in Italy, located about 100 kilometres (62 mi) north of Cagliari and about 35 kilometres (22 mi) northeast of Oristano. It has 135 inhabitants.

Boroneddu borders the municipalities of Ghilarza, Soddì, and Tadasuni.

== Demographics ==
As of 2026, the population is 135, of which 45.2% are male, and 54.8% are female. Minors make up 7.4% of the population, and seniors make up 44.4%.

Historical population

Year	Pop.	±%
1861	190	—
1871	184	−3.2%
1881	206	+12.0%
1901	220	+6.8%
1911	219	−0.5%
1921	208	−5.0%
1931	232	+11.5%
1936	264	+13.8%

Year	Pop.	±%
1951	279	+5.7%
1961	241	−13.6%
1971	194	−19.5%
1981	211	+8.8%
1991	209	−0.9%
2001	184	−12.0%
2011	165	−10.3%
2021	154	−6.7%

Source: ISTAT

=== Immigration ===
As of 2025, of the known countries of birth of 142 residents, the most numerous are: Italy (129 – 90.8%), Morocco (4 – 2.8%), Germany (4 – 2.8%), Romania (3 – 2.1%), Latvia (1 – 0.7%) and France (1 – 0.7%).
