= Norbello =

Norbello Norghiddo
- Comune
- Comune di Norbello
- Location within Sardinia
- Coordinates: 40°8′N 8°50′E
- Country: Italy
- Region: Sardinia
- Province: Province of Oristano (OR)

Area
  - Total: 26.1 km^{2} (10.1 sq mi)

Population (Dec. 2004)
  - Total: 1,208
  - Density: 46.3/km^{2} (120/sq mi)
- Demonym: Norbellesi
- Time zone: UTC+1 (CET)
  - Summer (DST): UTC+2 (CEST)
- Postal code: 09070
- Dialing code: 0785

Norbello (Sardinian: Norghiddo) is a comune (municipality) in the Province of Oristano in the Italian region Sardinia, located about 100 kilometres (62 mi) north of Cagliari and about 35 kilometres (22 mi) northeast of Oristano. As of 31 December 2004, it had a population of 1,208 and an area of 26.1 square kilometres (10.1 mi^{2}).

Norbello borders the following municipalities: Abbasanta, Aidomaggiore, Borore, Ghilarza, Santu Lussurgiu.

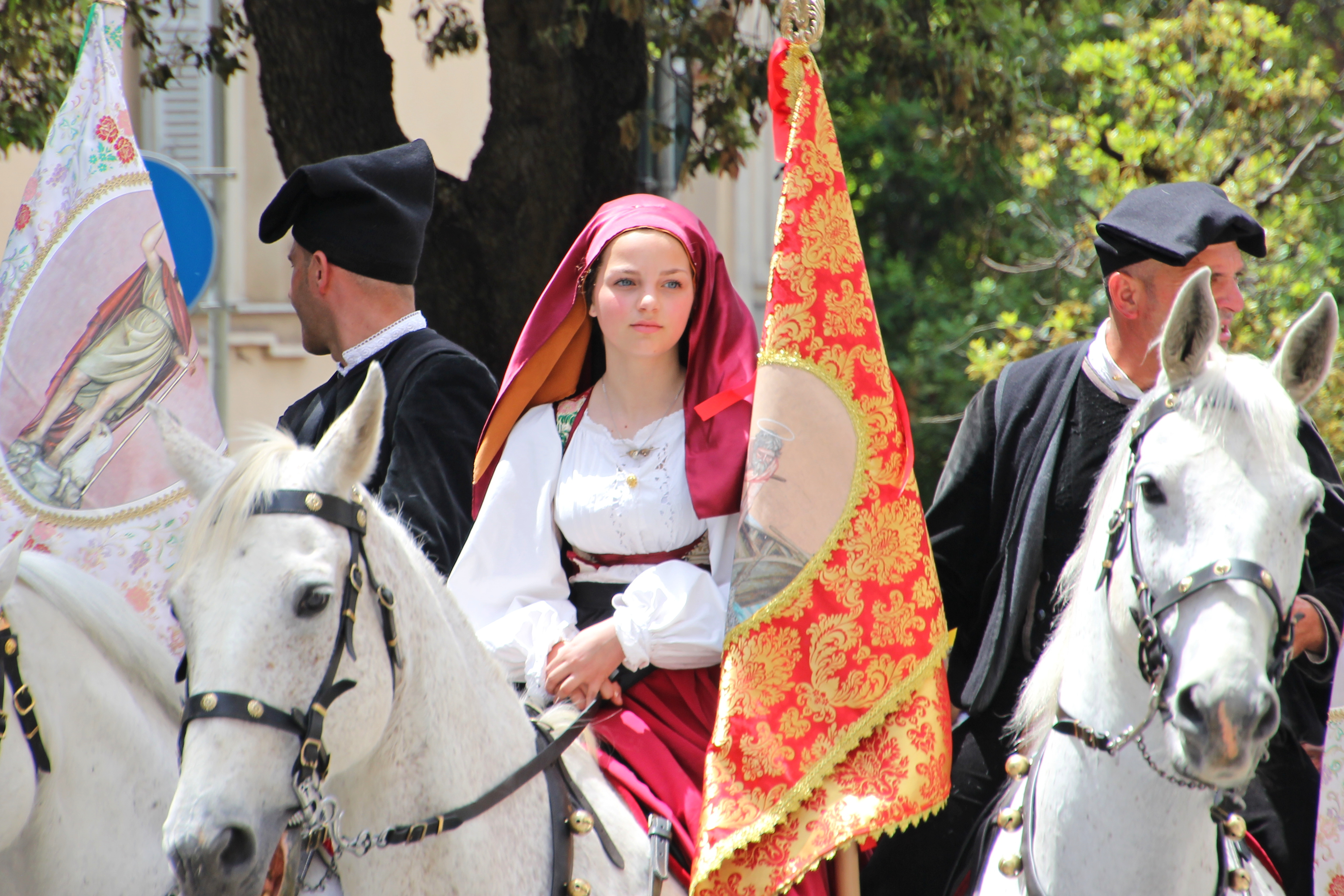
Traditional garments from Norbello

== Demographic evolution ==
Historical population

Year	Pop.	±%
1861	879	—
1871	982	+11.7%
1881	1,031	+5.0%
1901	918	−11.0%
1911	836	−8.9%

Year	Pop.	±%
1921	987	+18.1%
1931	963	−2.4%
1936	999	+3.7%
1951	1,221	+22.2%
1961	1,102	−9.7%

Year	Pop.	±%
1971	1,005	−8.8%
1981	954	−5.1%
1991	1,192	+24.9%
2001	1,223	+2.6%

Source: Data from ISTAT
