= Lake Liscia =

Artificial lake in Sardinia, Italy

- Lago Liscia (Italian)
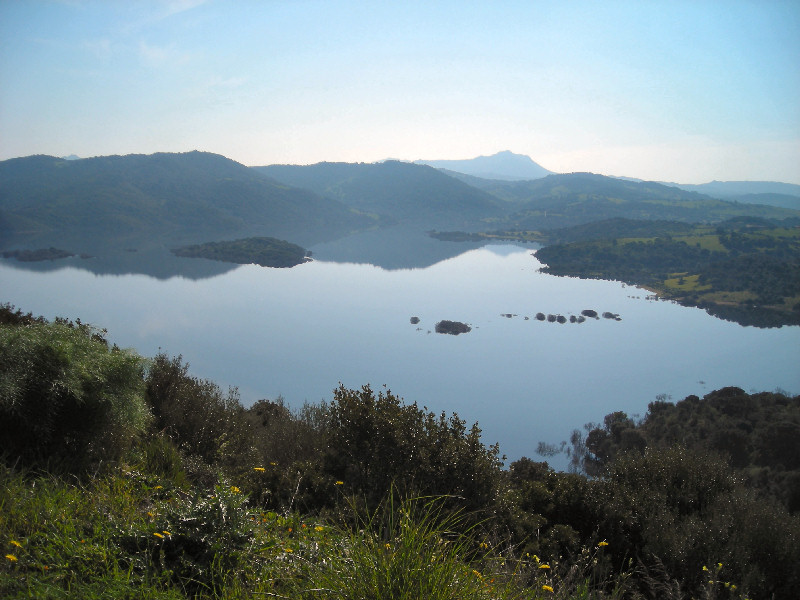

- Location within Sardinia
- Location: North Eastern Sardinia
- Coordinates: 41.000695°N 9.263964°E
- Type: artificial lake
- Primary inflows: Liscia
- Primary outflows: Liscia
- Basin countries: Italy
- Surface area: 5.6 km^{2} (2.2 sq mi)
- Max. depth: 69 m (226 ft)
- Water volume: 105×10^{6} m^{3} (85,000 acre⋅ft)

Lake Liscia (Italian: Lago Liscia) is an artificial lake, in northern Sardinia, Italy, located between the municipalities of Sant'Antonio di Gallura, Luras, Arzachena and Luogosanto, in the Gallura region.

With a capacity of 105 million cubic metres of water, it is the principal reservoir in north eastern Sardinia.

The dam, constructed in 1964, is 65 metres wide.
