= Liamone landscape =

- Landscape
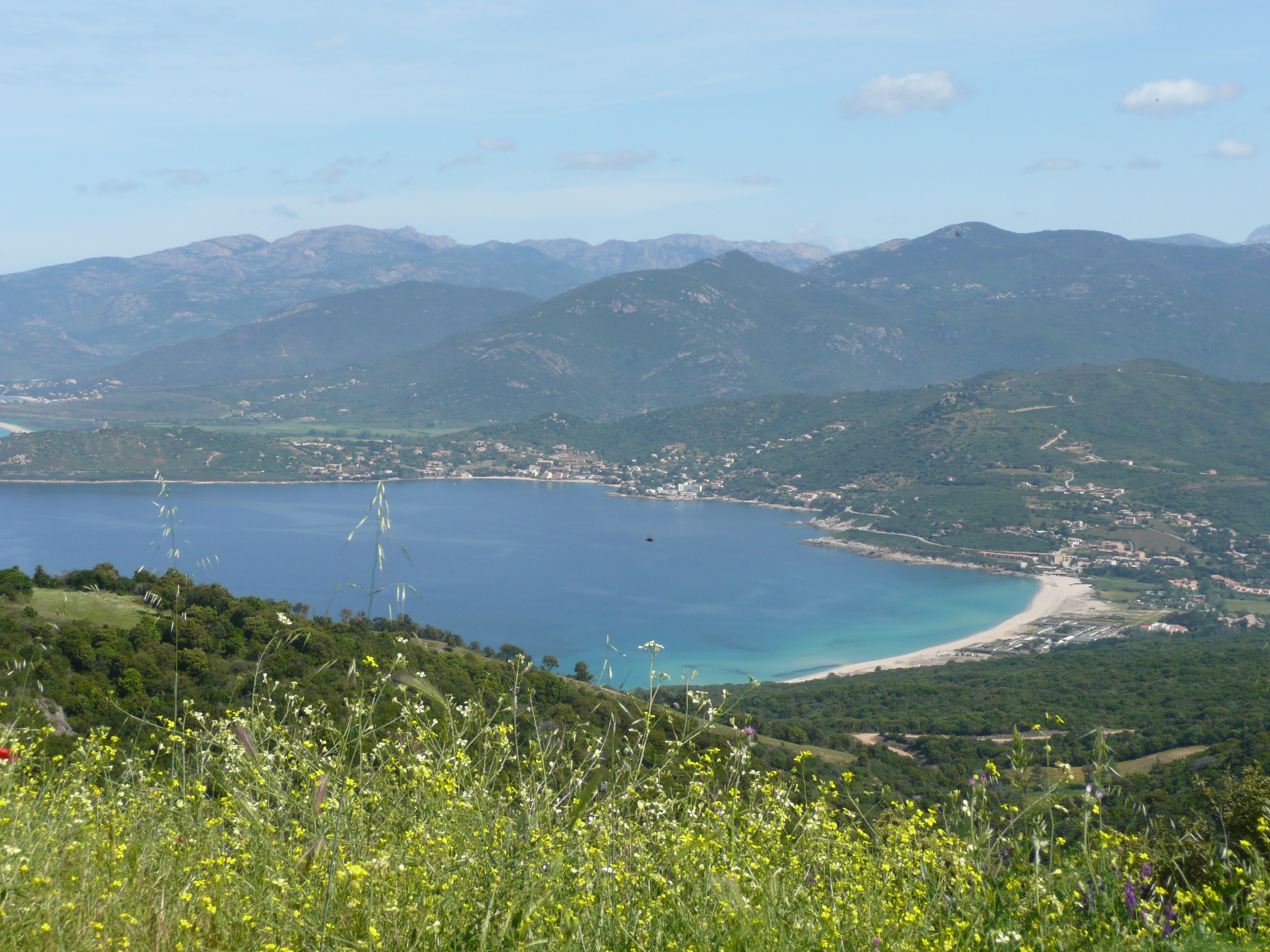
- Tiuccia and the Golfe de Liscia

- Location within Corsica Location within France
- Coordinates: 42.086°N 8.777°E
- Country: France
- Region: Corsica
- Department: Corse-du-Sud

The Liamone landscape (French: Ensemble Liamone) is an area of Corsica defined under the European Landscape Convention, which promotes the protection, management and planning of the landscapes and organizes international co-operation on landscape issues.

== Extent ==
The Liamone region on the west of Corsica extends from the Gulf of Sagone, the largest and widest of the Corsican gulfs, to the Monte Rotondo Massif and Monte d'Oro. It includes the watersheds of the Sagone, Liamone and Liscia rivers. These have created a large alluvial plain along the coast. Edward Lear wrote of it in 1868,

I cross a small old-fashioned hamlet, made up of dark, black or brown houses. A wooded island, such is Corsica, this region, in particular where only the high peaks emerge from a lush universe. Olive trees, hazelnuts, fig trees in profusion, vineyards, wheat fields brighten up the surrounding landscape. The wildest corners are carpeted with ferns, darkened by noble chestnut trees. This valley, embraced by the mountains, however, is spacious enough to dispel any feeling of confinement or melancholy.

== Coastline ==
The coast along the RD81 road has two concavities. To the north, the Anse de Sagone has two beaches that are sheltered from the westerly winds by the Punta di Trio. It is largely urbanized, with a marina and a seaside resort that has developed since the 1970s on the site of the ancient city of Sagone, which was deserted in the 16th century. In the south, there is residential urbanization around Tiuccia and the coastline at the bottom of the small Golfe de Liscia, the sea outlet of the Cinarca. Between these two bays there is a huge sandy beach open to the sea, between two rocky points. A coastal barrier isolates the Liamone river from the sea, with a space of still waters behind it. The beaches of San Giuseppe and Liamone are much less frequented than those of the neighboring Gulf of Ajaccio, and have remained largely natural.

== Units ==
The landscape contains seven units:

River	Units
Liamone	Plaine du Liamone, Haut Liamone
Liscia	Cinarca - Liscia
Cruzini	Vallée de Cruzinu
Guagno	Sorru in su
Sagone	Vallée de Sagone, Haute vallée de Sagone

== Sources ==
- "Liamone – 3.15", Atlas des paysages de la Region Corse (PDF) (in French), Direction régionale de l’environnement, de l’aménagement et du logement Corse
