= Sorradile =

- Comune
- Comune di Sorradile
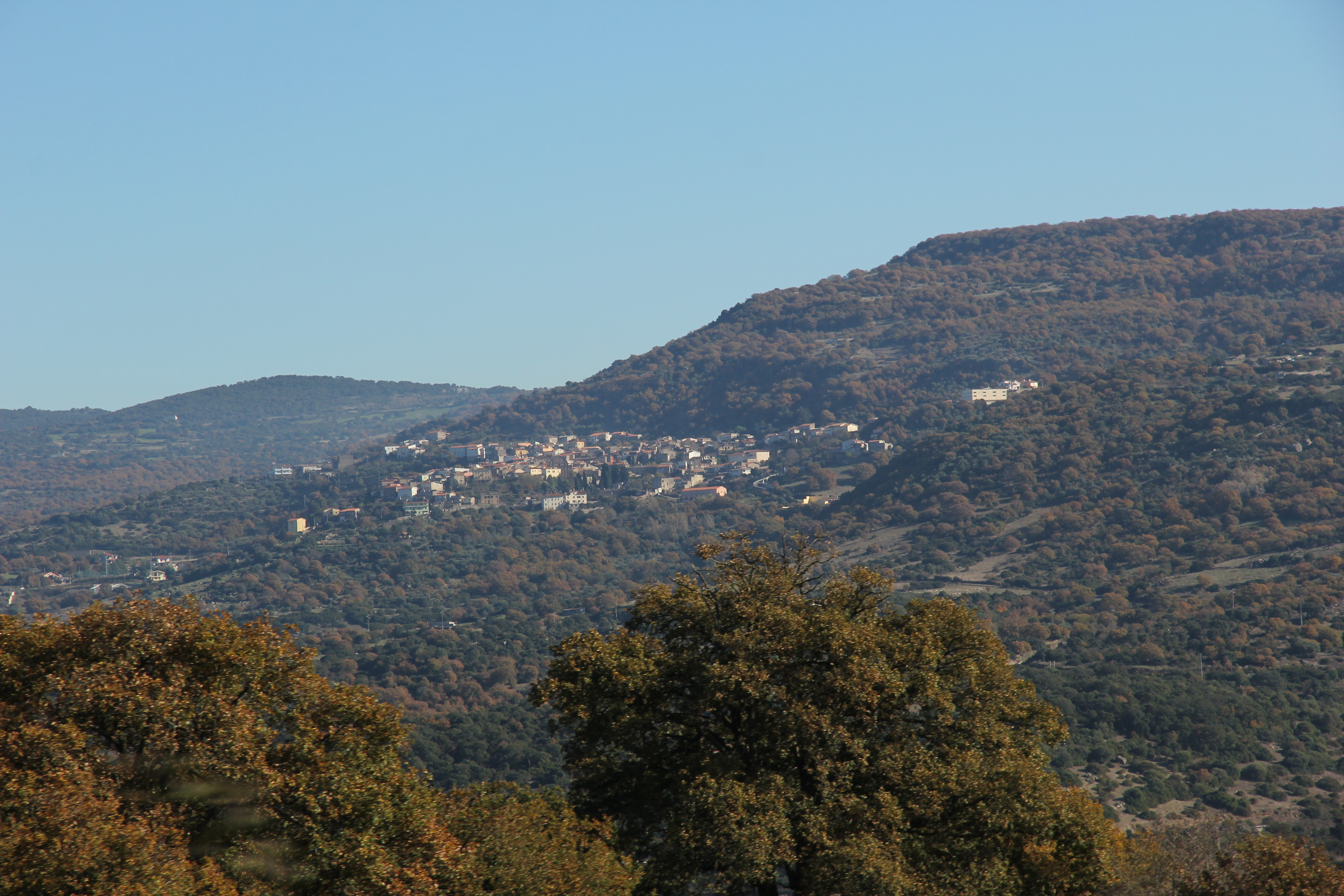

- Location within Sardinia
- Coordinates: 40°6′N 8°56′E
- Country: Italy
- Region: Sardinia
- Province: Oristano (OR)

Government
  - Mayor: Pietro Arca

Area
  - Total: 26.34 km^{2} (10.17 sq mi)
- Elevation: 350 m (1,150 ft)

Population (30 November 2013)
  - Total: 402
  - Density: 15.3/km^{2} (39.5/sq mi)
- Demonym: Sorradilesi
- Time zone: UTC+1 (CET)
  - Summer (DST): UTC+2 (CEST)
- Postal code: 09080
- Dialing code: 0783
- Website: Official website

Sorradile is a comune (municipality) in the Province of Oristano in the Italian region Sardinia, located about 100 kilometres (62 mi) north of Cagliari and about 35 kilometres (22 mi) northeast of Oristano.

Sorradile borders the following municipalities: Ardauli, Bidonì, Ghilarza, Nughedu Santa Vittoria, Olzai, Sedilo, Tadasuni.
