= Torra d'Ancone =

Genoese coastal defence tower in Corsica

Tower of Ancone
- Torra d'Ancone (Corsican)
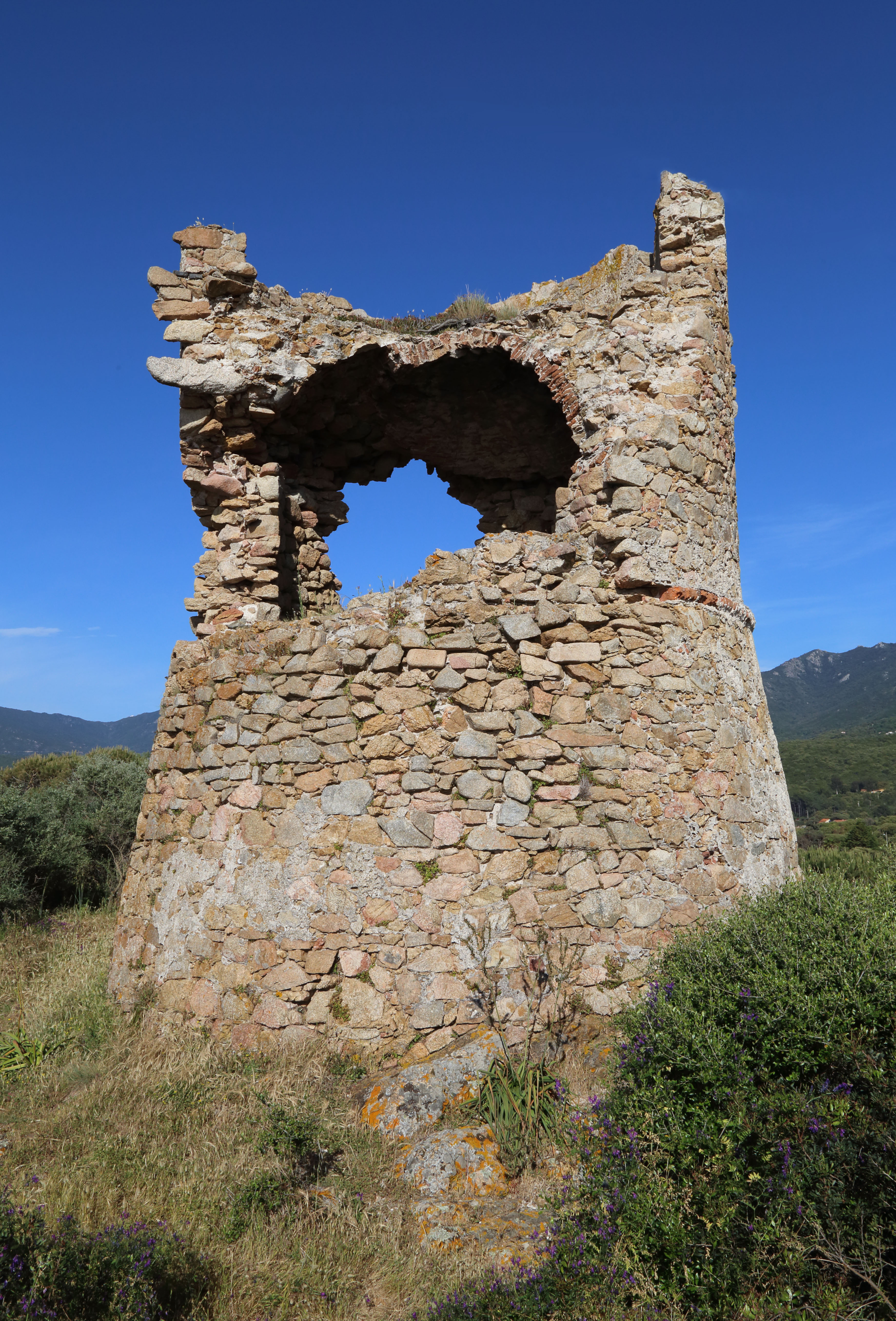

- Location within Corsica
- 42°2′32″N 8°43′35″E

History
- Built: 1581

The Tower of Ancone or Tower of Palmentoggio (Corsican: Torra d'Ancone) is a ruined Genoese tower located in the commune of Calcatoggio (Corse-du-Sud) on the west coast of the Corsica. The tower sits near the sea on the Punta di Palmentoju to the south of the Golfu di a Liscia.

The construction of the Tour d'Ancone began in 1581. It was one of a series of coastal defences constructed by the Republic of Genoa between 1530 and 1620 to stem the attacks by Barbary pirates.

In 2007 the tower was added to the Inventaire général du patrimoine culturel maintained by the French Ministry of Culture. It is privately owned.

== See also ==
- List of Genoese towers in Corsica
