= Ardauli =

Ardauli Ardaùle
- Comune
- Comune di Ardauli
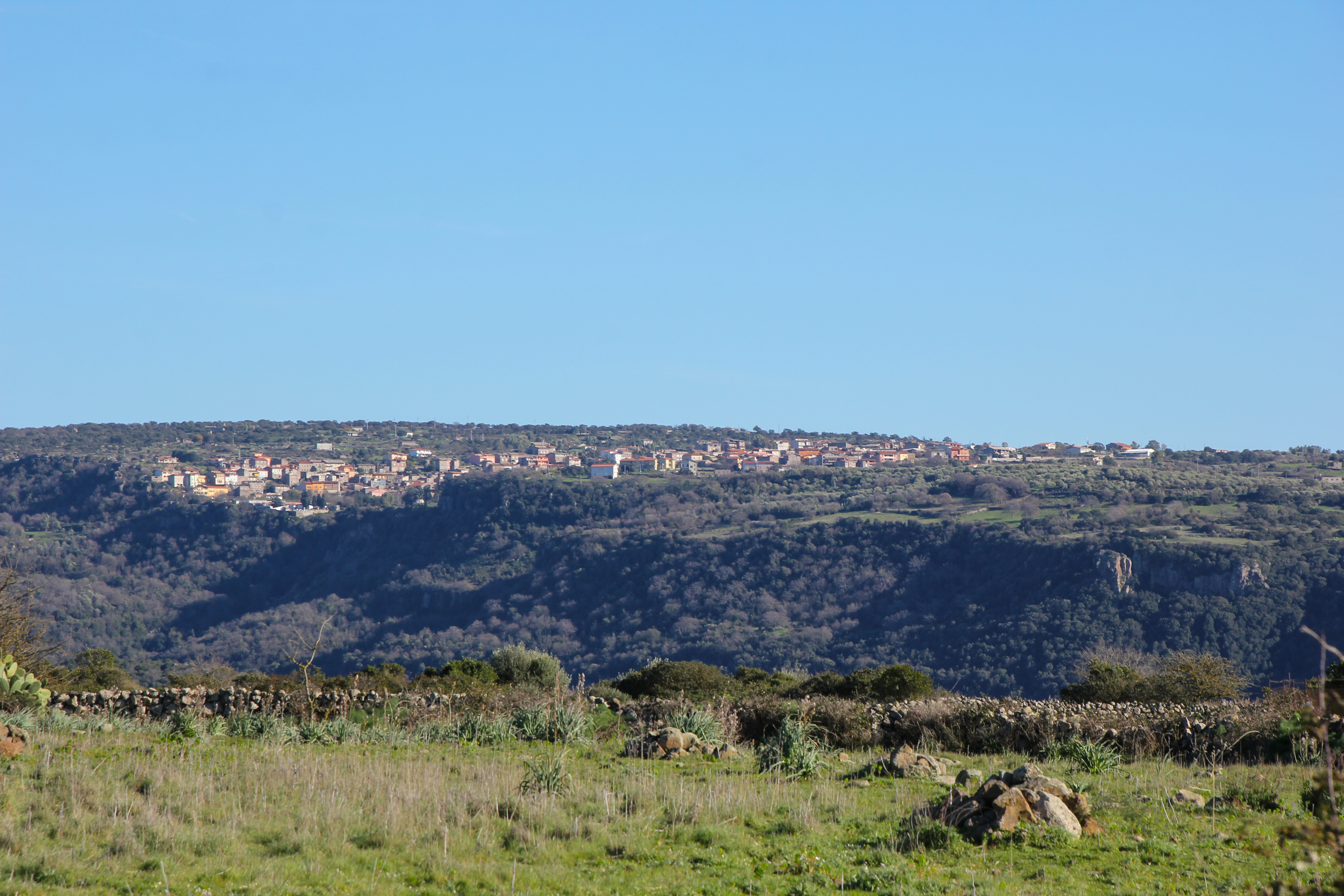

- Coat of arms

- Location of Ardauli in Sardinia
- Coordinates: 40°5′N 8°55′E
- Country: Italy
- Region: Sardinia
- Province: Oristano

Government
  - Mayor: Massimo Ibba

Area
  - Total: 20.53 km^{2} (7.93 sq mi)
- Elevation: 421 m (1,381 ft)

Population (2026)
  - Total: 738
  - Density: 35.9/km^{2} (93.1/sq mi)
- Demonyms: Ardaulesi; Ardaulesos
- Time zone: UTC+1 (CET)
  - Summer (DST): UTC+2 (CEST)
- Postal code: 09081
- Dialing code: 0783
- Website: Official website

Ardauli (Sardinian: Ardaùle) is a village and comune (municipality) in the Province of Oristano in the autonomous island region of Sardinia in Italy, located about 100 kilometres (62 mi) north of Cagliari and about 35 kilometres (22 mi) northeast of Oristano. It has 738 inhabitants.

Ardauli borders the municipalities of Ghilarza, Neoneli, Nughedu Santa Vittoria, Sorradile, Tadasuni, and Ula Tirso.

== Demographics ==
As of 2026, the population is 738, of which 47.4% are male, and 52.6% are female. Minors make up 8.5% of the population, and seniors make up 41.9%.

Historical population

Year	Pop.	±%
1861	1,089	—
1871	1,204	+10.6%
1881	1,262	+4.8%
1901	1,414	+12.0%
1911	1,501	+6.2%
1921	1,536	+2.3%
1931	1,700	+10.7%
1936	1,725	+1.5%

Year	Pop.	±%
1951	1,954	+13.3%
1961	2,008	+2.8%
1971	1,754	−12.6%
1981	1,470	−16.2%
1991	1,352	−8.0%
2001	1,158	−14.3%
2011	946	−18.3%
2021	780	−17.5%

Source: ISTAT

=== Immigration ===
As of 2025, of the known countries of birth of 738 residents, the most numerous are: Italy (674 – 91.3%), Romania (14 – 1.9%), France (13 – 1.8%), Belgium (12 – 1.6%), Morocco (6 – 0.8%), Moldova (5 – 0.7%).
