= Sedilo =

Sedilo Sèdilo
- Comune
- Comune di Sedilo
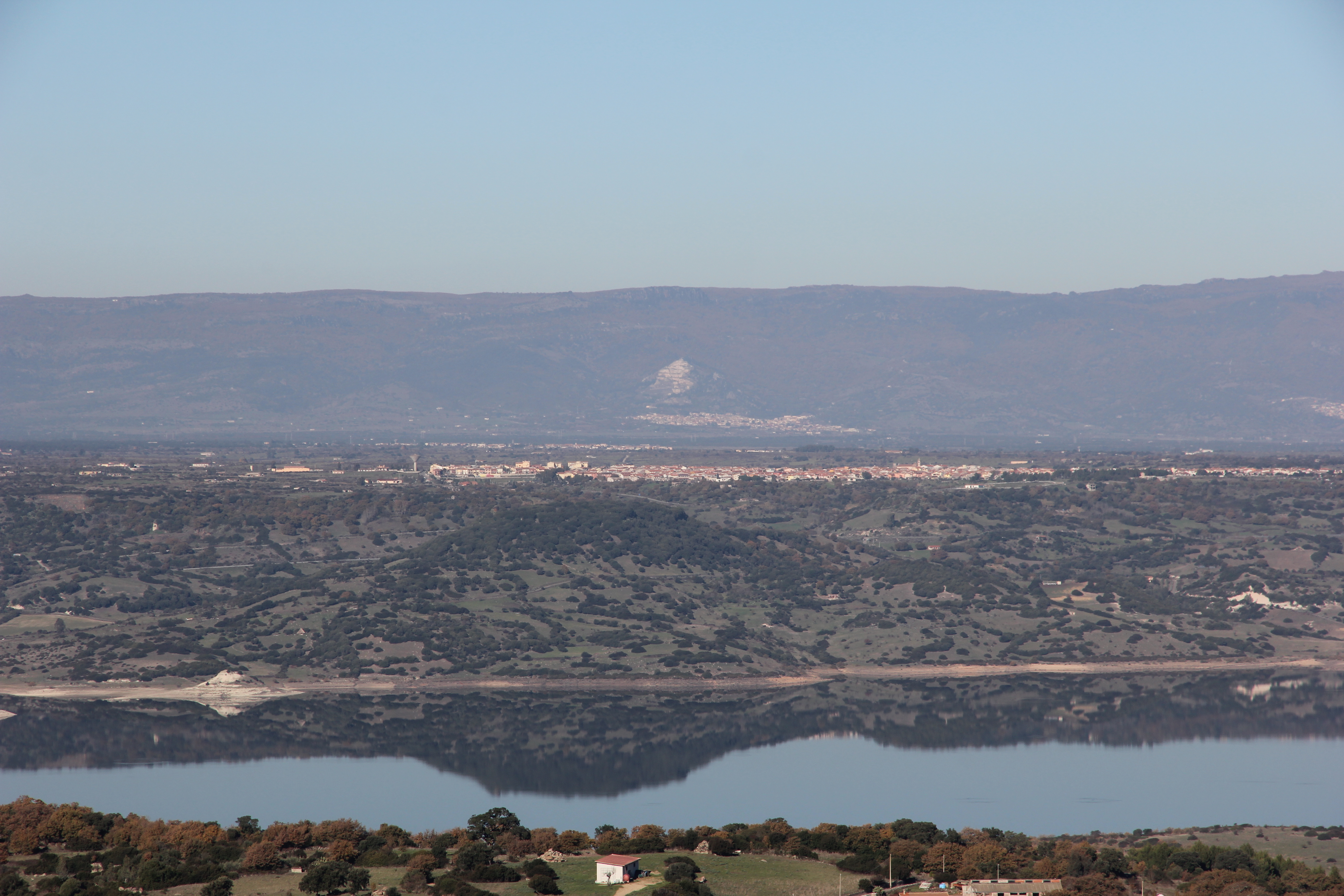

- Coat of arms

- Location within Sardinia
- Coordinates: 40°11′N 8°55′E
- Country: Italy
- Region: Sardinia
- Province: Oristano (OR)

Government
  - Mayor: Salvatore Pes

Area
  - Total: 68.45 km^{2} (26.43 sq mi)
- Elevation: 283 m (928 ft)

Population (28 February 2017)
  - Total: 2,118
  - Density: 30.94/km^{2} (80.14/sq mi)
- Demonym: Sedilesi
- Time zone: UTC+1 (CET)
  - Summer (DST): UTC+2 (CEST)
- Postal code: 09076
- Dialing code: 0785
- Website: Official website

Sedilo (Sardinian: Sèdilo) is a comune (municipality) in the Province of Oristano in the Italian region of Sardinia, about 110 kilometres (68 mi) north of Cagliari and about 40 kilometres (25 mi) northeast of Oristano. It borders the municipalities of Aidomaggiore, Bidonì, Dualchi, Ghilarza, Noragugume, Olzai, Ottana and Sorradile.

The Sanctuary of San Costantino Imperatore in Sedilo, whose main church was built in the 16th century around a 6th-century one. It is in Gothic-Catalan style.

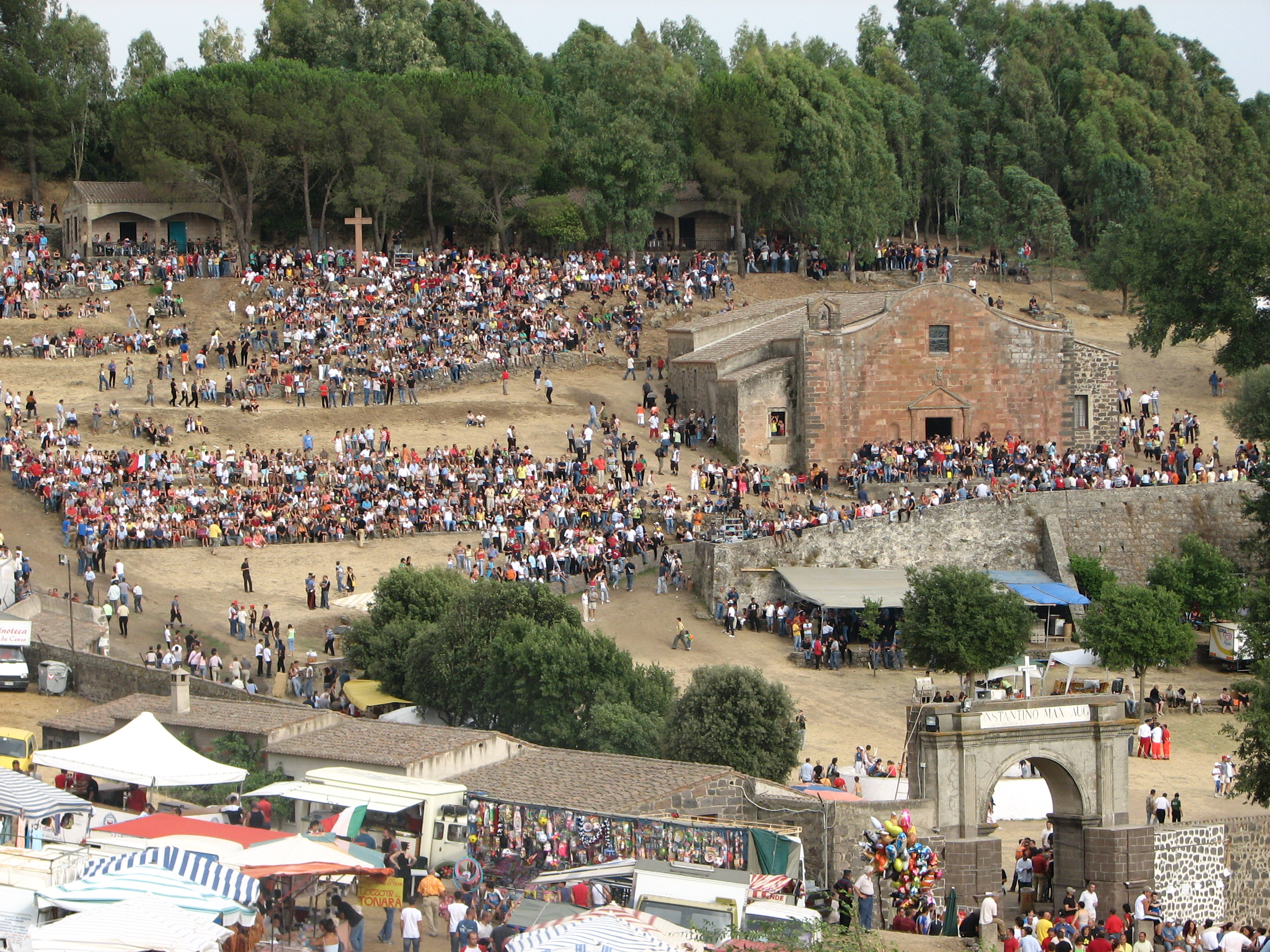
Sanctuary of Saint Constantine
