= Olzai =

Olzai Ortzai (Sardinian)
- Comune
- Comune di Olzai
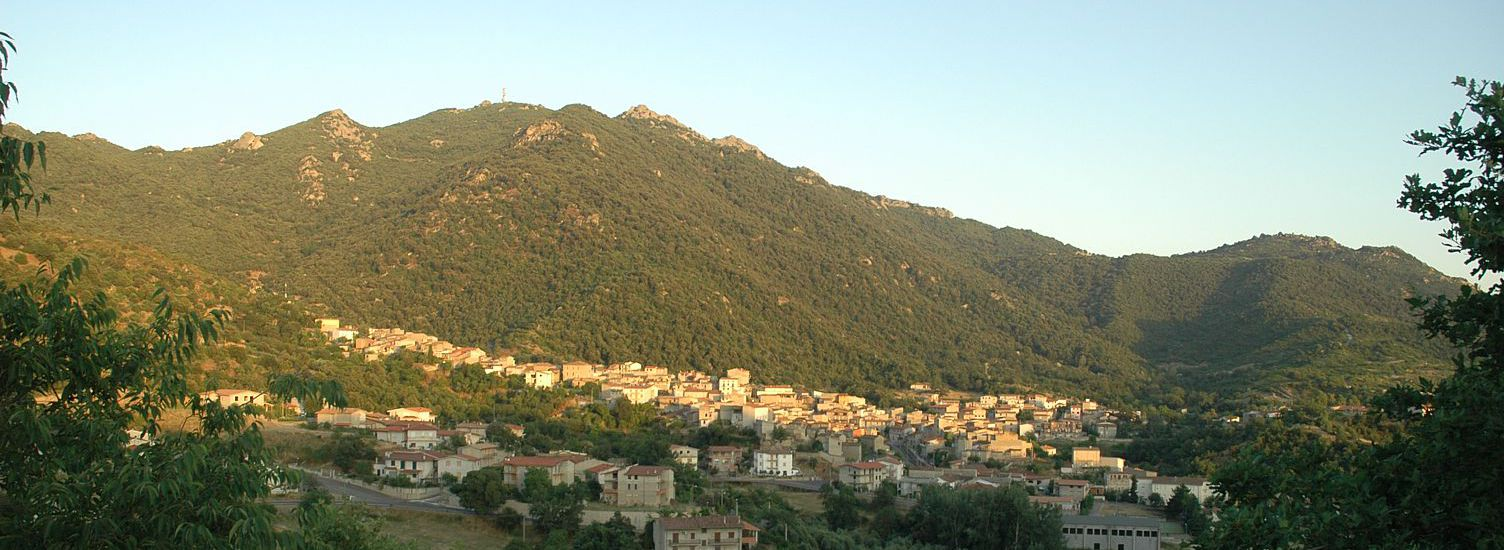
- View of Olzai

- Location within Sardinia
- Coordinates: 40°11′N 9°9′E
- Country: Italy
- Region: Sardinia
- Province: Nuoro (NU)

Government
  - Mayor: Ester Satta

Area
  - Total: 69.82 km^{2} (26.96 sq mi)
- Elevation: 474 m (1,555 ft)

Population (2026)
  - Total: 752
  - Density: 10.8/km^{2} (27.9/sq mi)
- Demonym: Olzaesi
- Time zone: UTC+1 (CET)
  - Summer (DST): UTC+2 (CEST)
- Postal code: 08020
- Dialing code: 0784
- Website: Official website

Olzai (Sardinian: Ortzai) is a village and comune (municipality) in the Province of Nuoro in the autonomous island region of Sardinia in Italy, located about 110 kilometres (68 mi) north of Cagliari and about 20 kilometres (12 mi) southwest of Nuoro. It has 752 inhabitants.

Olzai borders the municipalities of Austis, Nughedu Santa Vittoria, Ollolai, Ottana, Sarule, Sedilo, Sorradile, and Teti.

== Demographics ==
As of 2026, the population is 752, of which 50.9% are male, and 49.1% are female. Minors make up 10.9% of the population, and seniors make up 34.2%.

Historical population

Year	Pop.	±%
1861	1,220	—
1871	1,164	−4.6%
1881	1,213	+4.2%
1901	1,372	+13.1%
1911	1,250	−8.9%
1921	1,306	+4.5%
1931	1,478	+13.2%
1936	1,505	+1.8%

Year	Pop.	±%
1951	1,736	+15.3%
1961	1,884	+8.5%
1971	1,481	−21.4%
1981	1,278	−13.7%
1991	1,162	−9.1%
2001	1,046	−10.0%
2011	903	−13.7%
2021	774	−14.3%

Source: ISTAT

=== Immigration ===
As of 2025, immigrants make up 5.4% of the population. The 5 largest foreign countries of birth are Romania, Peru, Morocco, Germany, and Poland.
