= Sagone (river) =

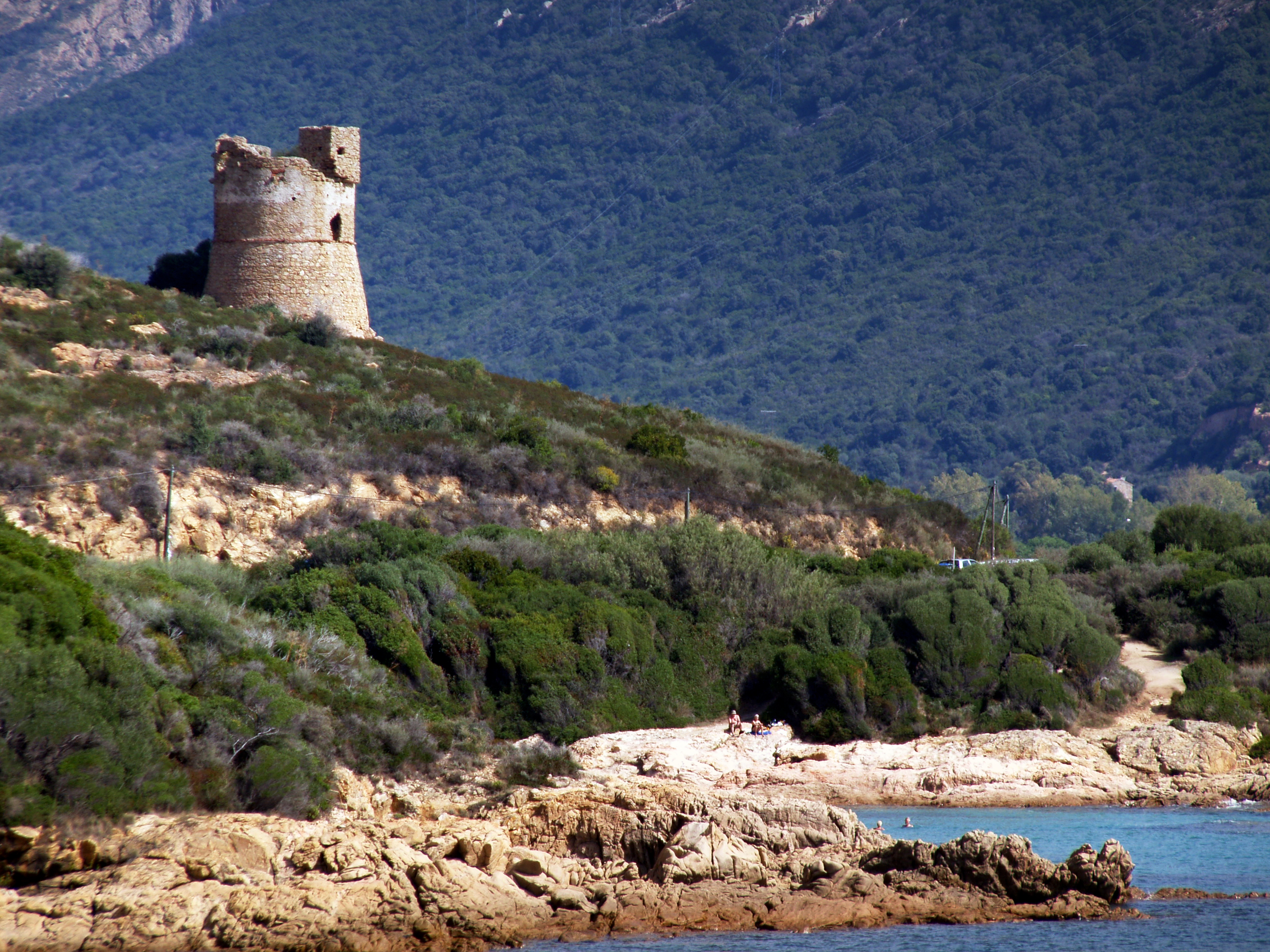
- Genoese Torra di Sagone at the mouth of the river

- Location within Corsica Location within France
- Native name: Rivière de Sagone (French)

Location
- Country: France
- Region: Corsica
- Department: Corse-du-Sud

Physical characteristics
- Mouth: Mediterranean Sea
  - coordinates: 42.1152°N 8.6891°E
- Length: 21.78 kilometres (13.53 mi)

The Sagone (French: Rivière de Sagone) is a coastal river in the northwest of the department of Corse-du-Sud, Corsica, France.

== Course ==
The Sagone is 21.78 kilometres (13.53 mi) long. It crosses the communes of Balogna, Marignana and Vico. The river rises as the Ruisseau de Fiuminale in Marignana on the north slope of the 1,273 metres (4,177 ft) Capu Sant'Anghiulu. It flows in a generally southwest direction past Marignana and Balogna to enter the sea at the Anse de Sagone in the town of Sagone.

== Valley ==
The Sagone valley is the most northerly of the watersheds in the Liamone landscape. The lower valley has large beaches and gentle relief, and is urbanized along its coastal fringe, with an almost continuous constructed line. Behind the seaside resort there are some remains of the city of Sagone, a Roman colony and later the seat of a bishopric, that was abandoned before the 16th century due to malaria epidemics and barbarian raids. There are two menhirs in the masonry of the old Romanesque cathedral that date back to the Neolithic period. The alluvial plain has meadows and marshy alder forests along the course of the river. Residential housing estates have been developed on the side of the Capu a u Bellu, the site of the Genoese tower, somewhat spoiling the landscape.

Above the coastal fringe the valley narrows and there are few buildings. Abandoned fields have been taken over by maquis shrubland. The slopes are covered with vegetation broken by granite outcrops. The upper part of the valley is separated from the lower by hills near the Bains de Caldanelle. There is only one village, Bologna, accessible via the Saint-Antoine pass and the Vico basin. Most of the old cultivated terraces have been abandoned, and the rest of the valley is accessible only by footpaths and is covered by maquis and forest.

== Hydrology ==
The river was measured at the Pont de Ficaghiola station in Vico from 1978 to 1989. At this point the watershed is 62.3 square kilometres (24.1 sq mi). The maximum daily flow was 12 cubic metres per second (420 cu ft/s) recorded on 16 November 1979.

== Tributaries ==
The following streams (ruisseaux) are tributaries of the Sagone (ordered by length) and sub-tributaries:

- Juane Rangu: 7 km (4.3 mi)
  - Alinu: 2 km (1.2 mi)
- Chialza: 5 km (3.1 mi)
  - Cristimoduli: 3 km (1.9 mi)
  - Madria Chialza: 3 km (1.9 mi)
- Pinu: 5 km (3.1 mi)
- Cerasa: 4 km (2.5 mi)
- Conche: 3 km (1.9 mi)
- Muricce: 3 km (1.9 mi)
- Petaccia: 2 km (1.2 mi)
- Rinaldu: 2 km (1.2 mi)
- Suale: 2 km (1.2 mi)
- Cammerinu: 2 km (1.2 mi)
- Loriani: 2 km (1.2 mi)
- Specchiatoghiu: 1 km (0.62 mi)

== Sources ==
- Le Sagone à Vico [Pont de Ficaghiola] (in French), Ministère de l'Ecologie, du Développement Durable et de l'Energie
- "Liamone – 3.15", Atlas des paysages de la Region Corse (PDF) (in French), Direction régionale de l’environnement, de l’aménagement et du logement Corse
- "Relation: Rivière de Sagone (8481302)", OpenStreetMap
- "Rivière de Sagone", Sandre (in French)
