= Lake Baratz =

Lake in Sassari, Sardinia, Italy

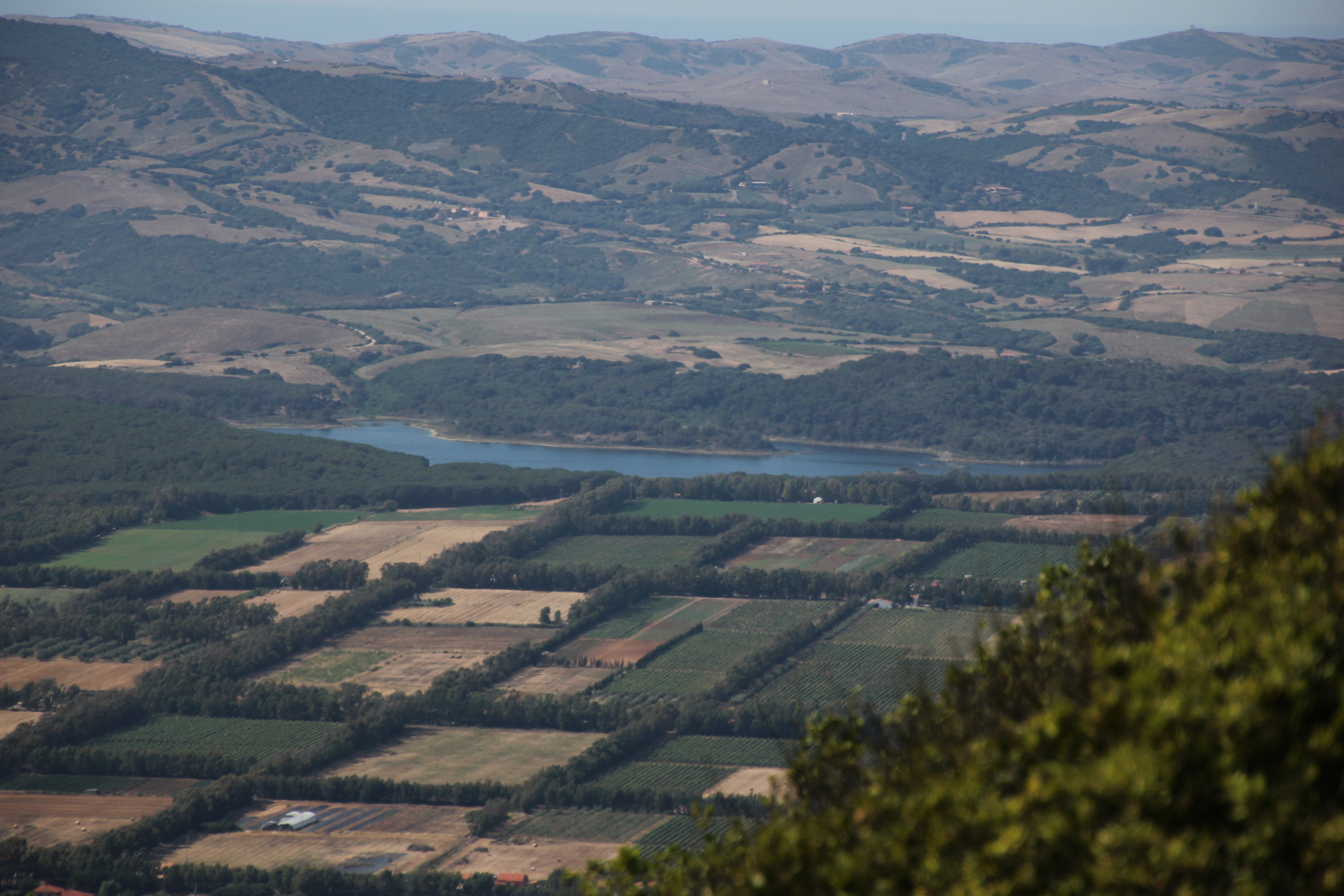

- Location within Sardinia
- Location: Province of Sassari, Sardinia
- Coordinates: 40.6809°N 8.2258°E
- Primary inflows: Rio dei Giunchi
- Primary outflows: none
- Basin countries: Italy
- Surface area: 0.6 km^{2} (0.23 sq mi)
- Surface elevation: 24 m (79 ft)

The Lake Baratz (Lago di Baratz in Italian, Lagu de Baratz in Sardinian) is a lake in the Province of Sassari, Sardinia, Italy. At an elevation of 24 m, its surface area is 0.6 km². It is the only natural freshwater lake in Sardinia. It is located inside the Municipality of Sassari, near Alghero.
