= Nughedu Santa Vittoria =

Nughedu Santa Vittoria Nughedu Santa Itòria
- Comune
- Comune di Nughedu Santa Vittoria
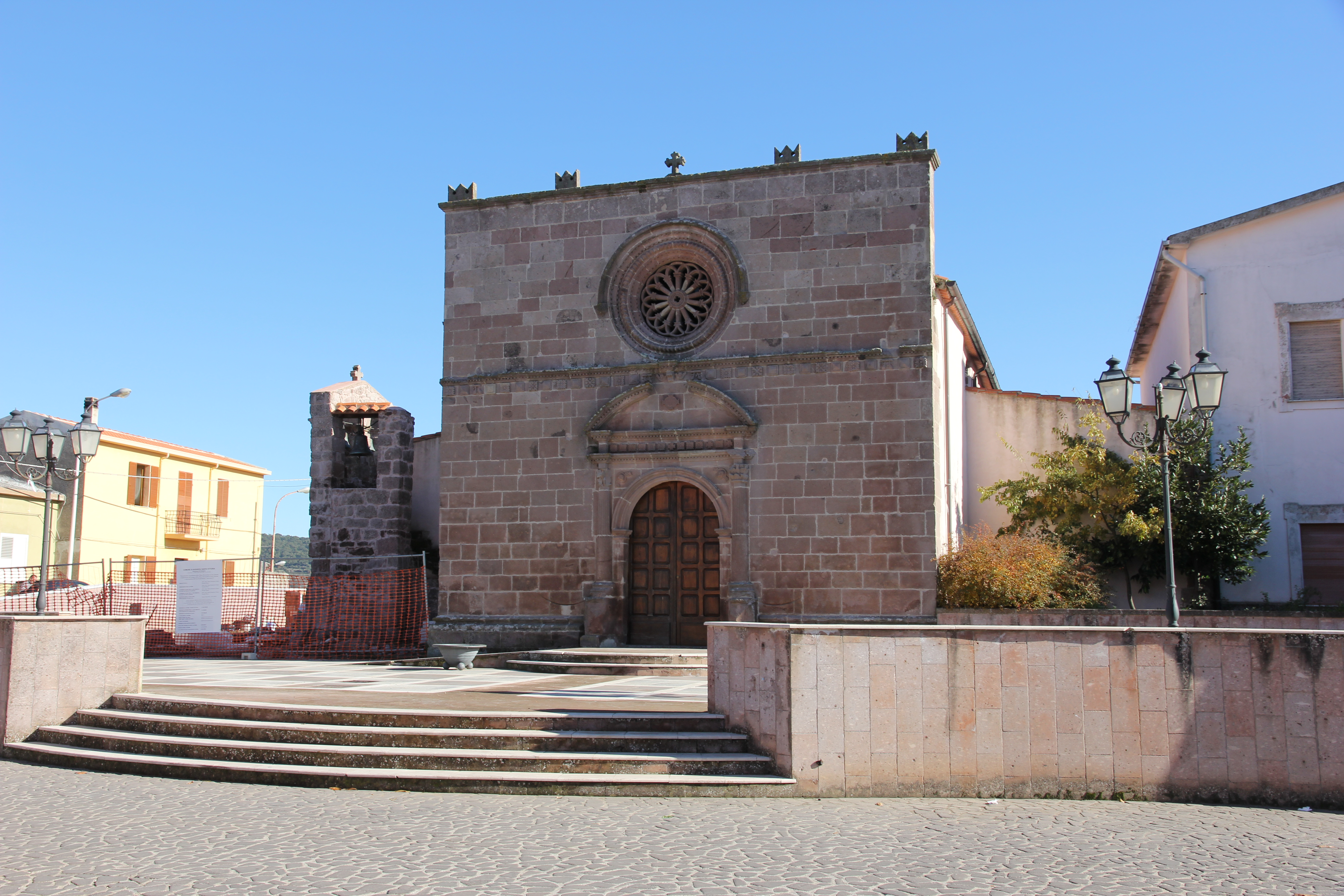
- Parish church

- Coat of arms

- Location within Sardinia
- Coordinates: 40°6′N 8°57′E
- Country: Italy
- Region: Sardinia
- Province: Oristano (OR)

Government
  - Mayor: Francesco Mura

Area
  - Total: 28.6 km^{2} (11.0 sq mi)
- Elevation: 533 m (1,749 ft)

Population (30 November 2017)
  - Total: 474
  - Density: 16.6/km^{2} (42.9/sq mi)
- Demonym: Nughedesi
- Time zone: UTC+1 (CET)
  - Summer (DST): UTC+2 (CEST)
- Postal code: 09080
- Dialing code: 0783
- Website: Official website

Nughedu Santa Vittoria (in Sardinian just Nughedu) is a comune (municipality) in the Province of Oristano in the Italian region of Sardinia, located about 100 kilometres (62 mi) north of Cagliari and about 40 kilometres (25 mi) northeast of Oristano.

Nughedu Santa Vittoria borders the municipalities of Ardauli, Austis, Bidonì, Neoneli, Olzai and Sorradile. It is home to a number of prehistoric structures, including several domus de janas and a proto-nuraghe.
