= Calcatoggio =

Commune in Corsica, France

- Commune
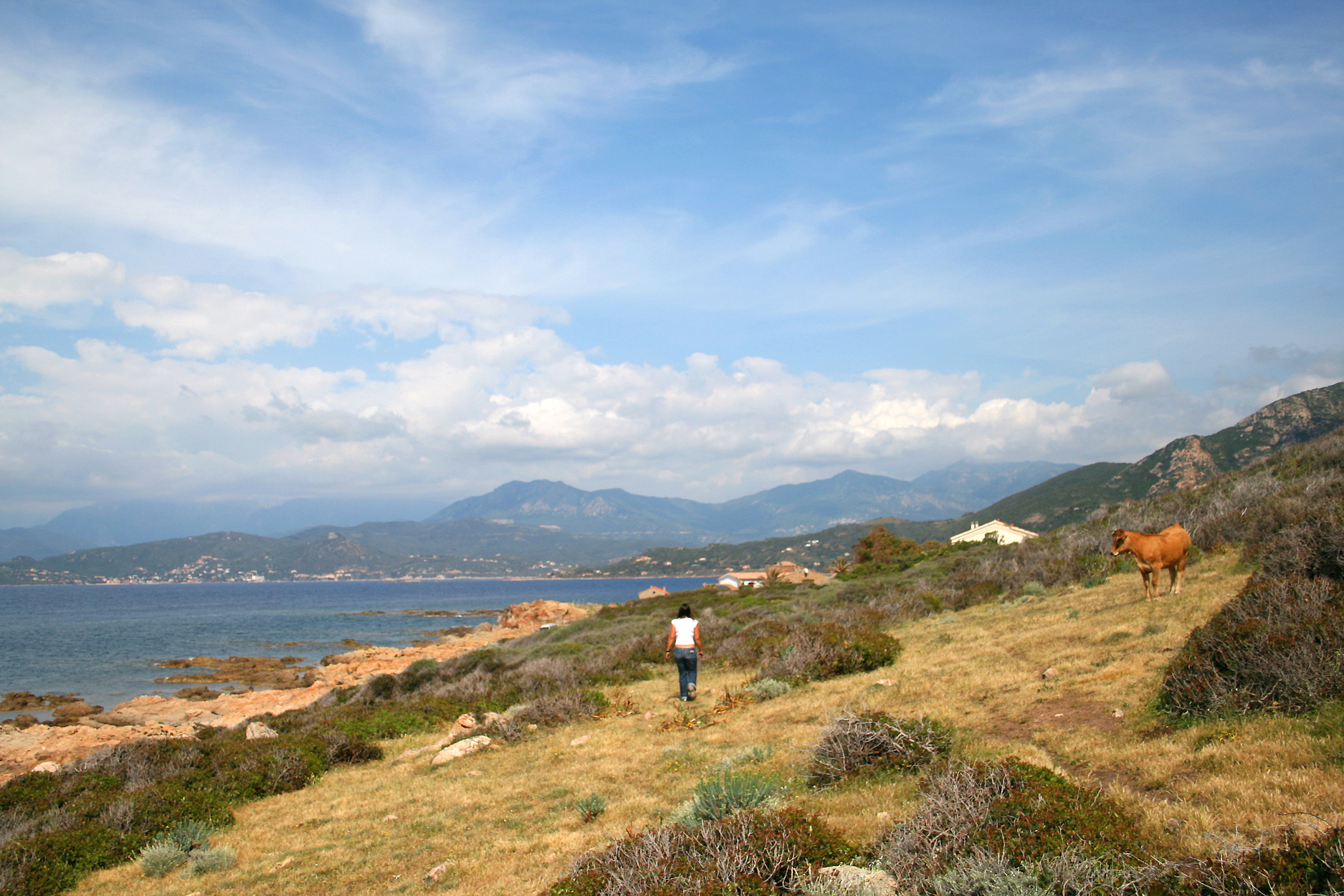
- The Gulf of Liscia, seen from Calcatoggio
- Location of Calcatoggio
- Location within France Location within Corsica
- Coordinates: 42°01′45″N 8°46′05″E
- Country: France
- Region: Corsica
- Department: Corse-du-Sud
- Arrondissement: Ajaccio
- Canton: Sevi-Sorru-Cinarca

Government
  - Mayor (2020–2026): Charles Chiappini
- Area^{1}: 22.65 km^{2} (8.75 sq mi)
- Elevation: 300 m (980 ft)
- Highest elevation: 876 m (2,874 ft)
- Lowest elevation: 0 m (0 ft)
- Population (2023): 516
  - Density: 22.8/km^{2} (59.0/sq mi)
- Time zone: UTC+01:00 (CET)
  - Summer (DST): UTC+02:00 (CEST)
- INSEE/Postal code: 2A048 /20111
- ^{1} French Land Register data, which excludes lakes, ponds, glaciers > 1 km^{2} (0.386 sq mi or 247 acres) and river estuaries.

Calcatoggio is a commune in the Corse-du-Sud department of France on the island of Corsica.

== Population ==
Historical population
Year	Pop.	±% p.a.
1968	422	—
1975	396	−0.90%
1982	332	−2.49%
1990	357	+0.91%
1999	356	−0.03%
2007	459	+3.23%
2012	532	+3.00%
2017	523	−0.34%
2023	516	−0.22%
Source: INSEE

== See also ==
- Tour d'Ancone
- Communes of the Corse-du-Sud department
