= Tirso (river) =

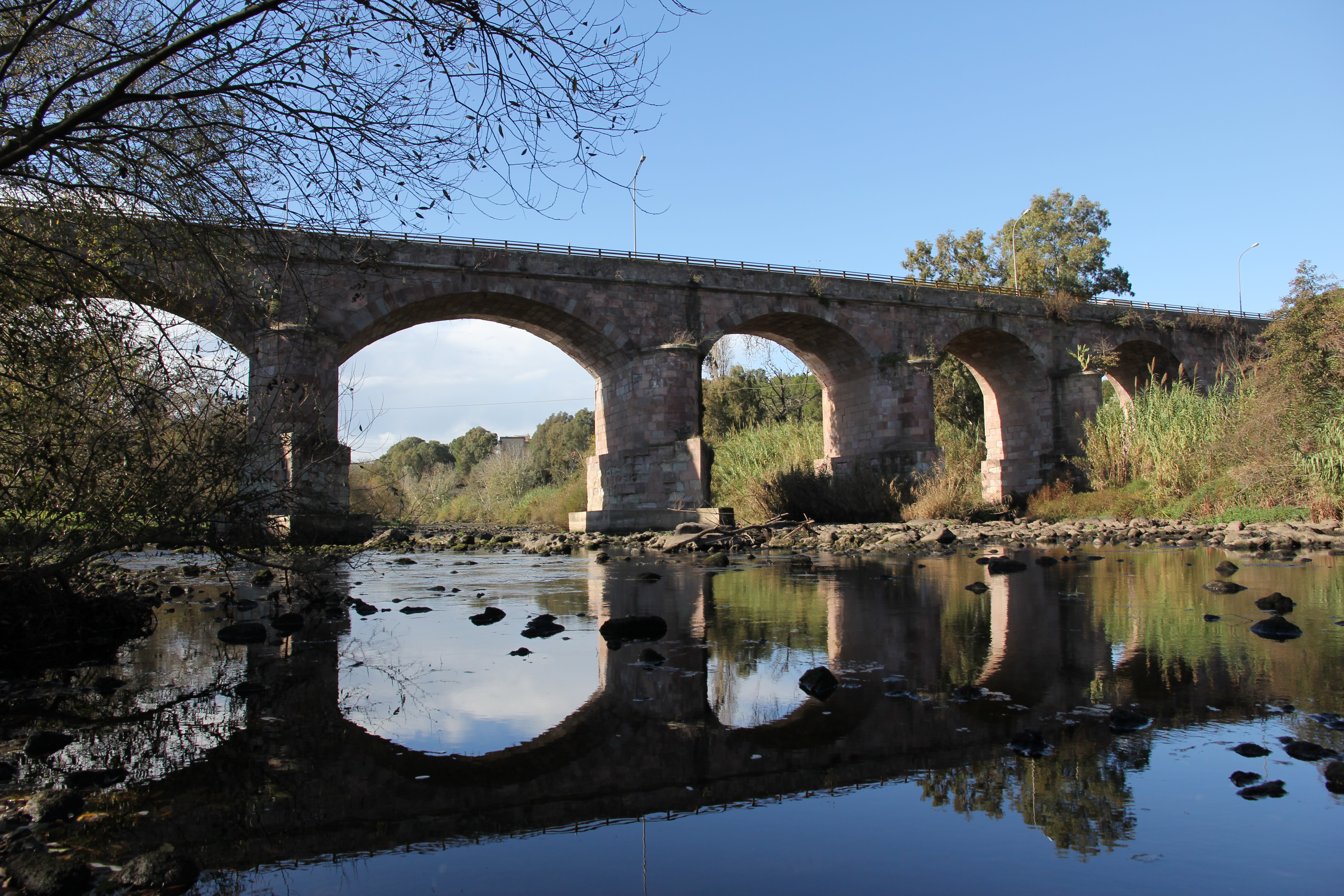
- Bridge over the Tirso at Fordongianus
- Native name: Tirsu (Sardinian)

Location
- Country: Italy
- Region: Sardinia

Physical characteristics
- Source
  - location: Punta Pianedda (Buddusò) plateau
  - elevation: 985 m (3,232 ft)
- Mouth: Mediterranean Sea
  - location: Gulf of Oristano
  - coordinates: 39.885°N 8.54056°E
  - elevation: 0 m (0 ft)
- Length: 152 km (94 mi)
- Basin size: 3,375 km^{2} (1,303 sq mi)
- Discharge
  - average: 4.28 m^{3}/s (151 cu ft/s)

The Tirso (Sardinian: Tirsu; Latin: Thyrsus) is a 152-kilometre (94 mi) river in Sardinia, Italy. It is the longest river on the island and has Sardinia's largest drainage basin. It rises on the plateau of Buddusò, on the slopes of Punta Pianedda, at an elevation of 985 metres (3,232 ft), and flows across the island from east to west, passing through Lake Omodeo before entering the Gulf of Oristano. Its principal tributaries are the Taloro and Flumineddu.

In its upper course, between its sources and the confluence with the Rio Liscoi, the Tirso follows a steep and winding channel. Between the Liscoi and Lake Omodeo, its gradient becomes progressively gentler and its course more regular. In its lower reach across the plain of Oristano, the river has a very low gradient and forms broad meanders.

The basin contains numerous artificial reservoirs, including Lake Omodeo, Lake Gusana, and Lake Cucchinadorza. Lake Omodeo, enlarged by the construction of the Eleonora d'Arborea Dam, has a maximum storage capacity of about 792 million cubic metres (209 billion US gallons).
