= Lake Omodeo =

Lake Omodeo Lago Omodeo Lagu Omodeu
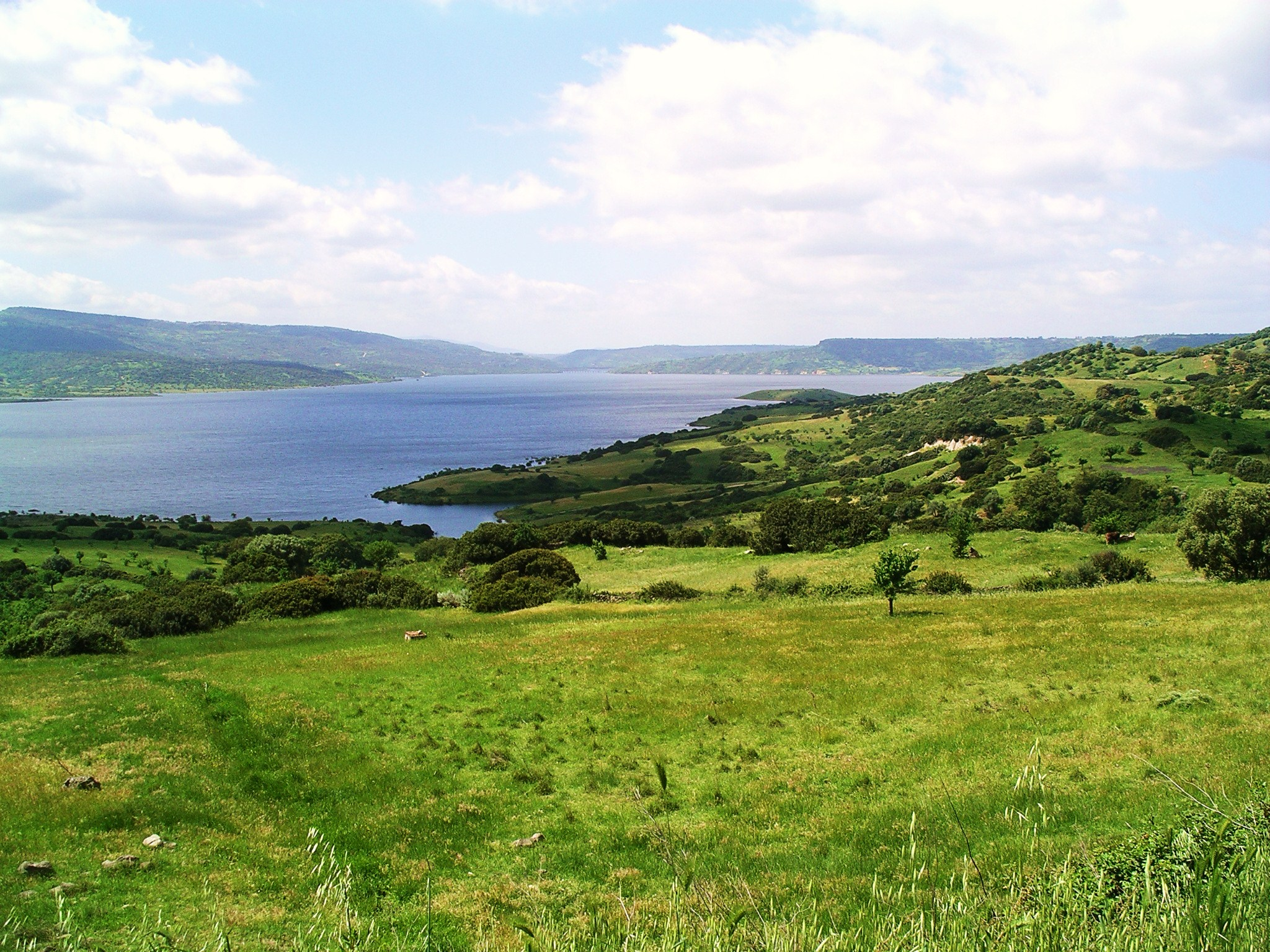

- Location within Sardinia
- Location: Sardinia
- Coordinates: 40°08′10″N 8°54′54″E
- Type: artificial lake
- Primary inflows: Tirso River
- Primary outflows: Tirso River
- Basin countries: Italy
- Max. length: 20 km (12 mi)
- Surface area: 29 km^{2} (11 sq mi)
- Water volume: 748,000,000 m^{3} (2.64×10^{10} cu ft)

Lake Omodeo (Italian: Lago Omodeo, Sardinian: Lagu Omodeu) is an artificial lake in central west Sardinia, Italy.

The lake was constructed in the 1920s. The dam, designed by the engineer Angelo Omodeo, was inaugurated in 1924, at that time it was the largest reservoir in Europe. The lake length is 20 km. Today, Lake Omodeo is the largest artificial reservoir on Sardinia.

A new dam was built in 1997, dedicated to the Sardinian medieval judge Eleonor of Arborea, it is 582 m long and 120 m wide.

== Ecology ==
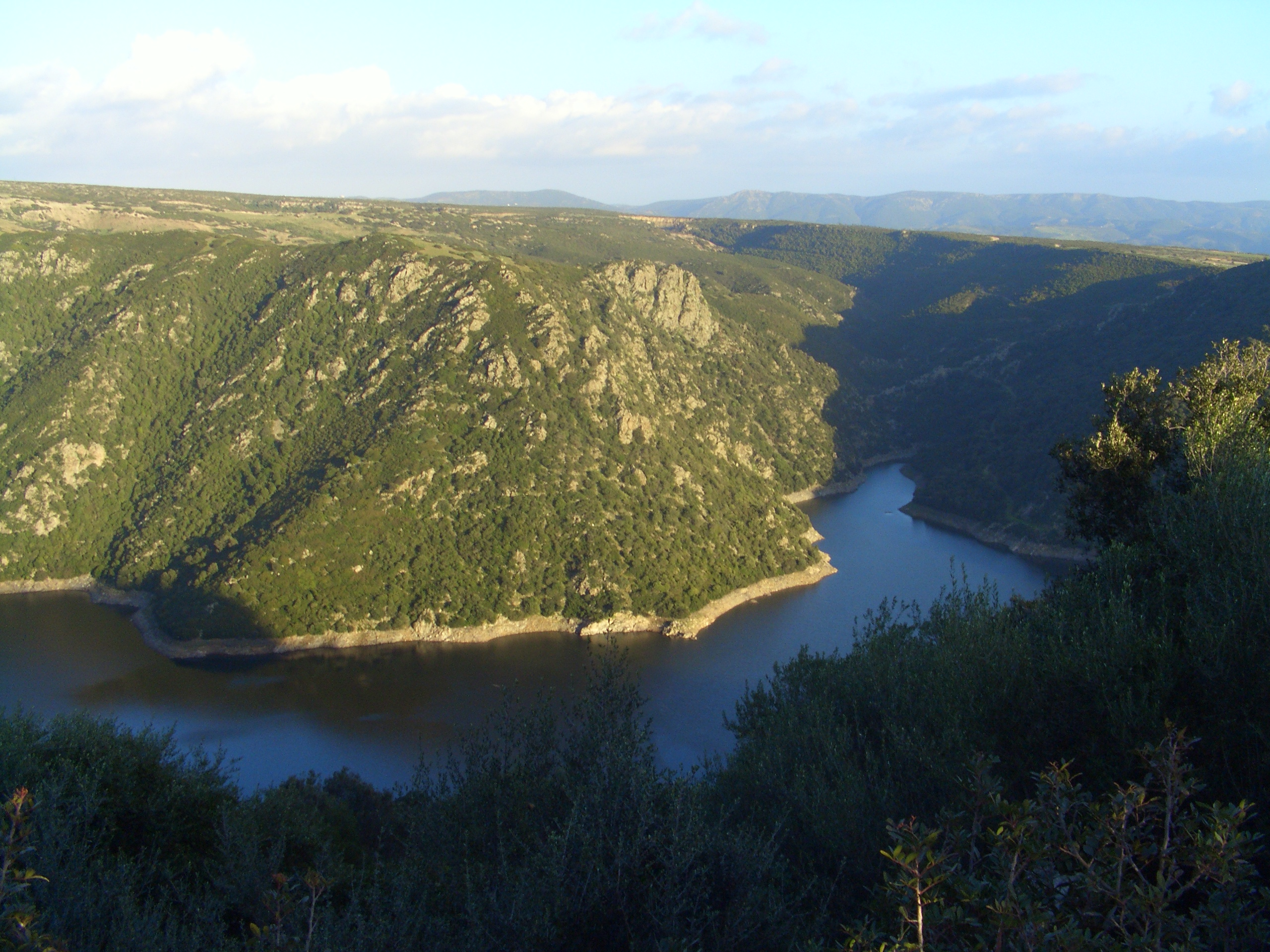
Lago Omodeo

A population of twait shad, relatively common in Italy but locally extinct elsewhere, has been established in the lake.
