= Ghilarza =

Ghilarza Ilartzi
- Comune
- Comune di Ghilarza
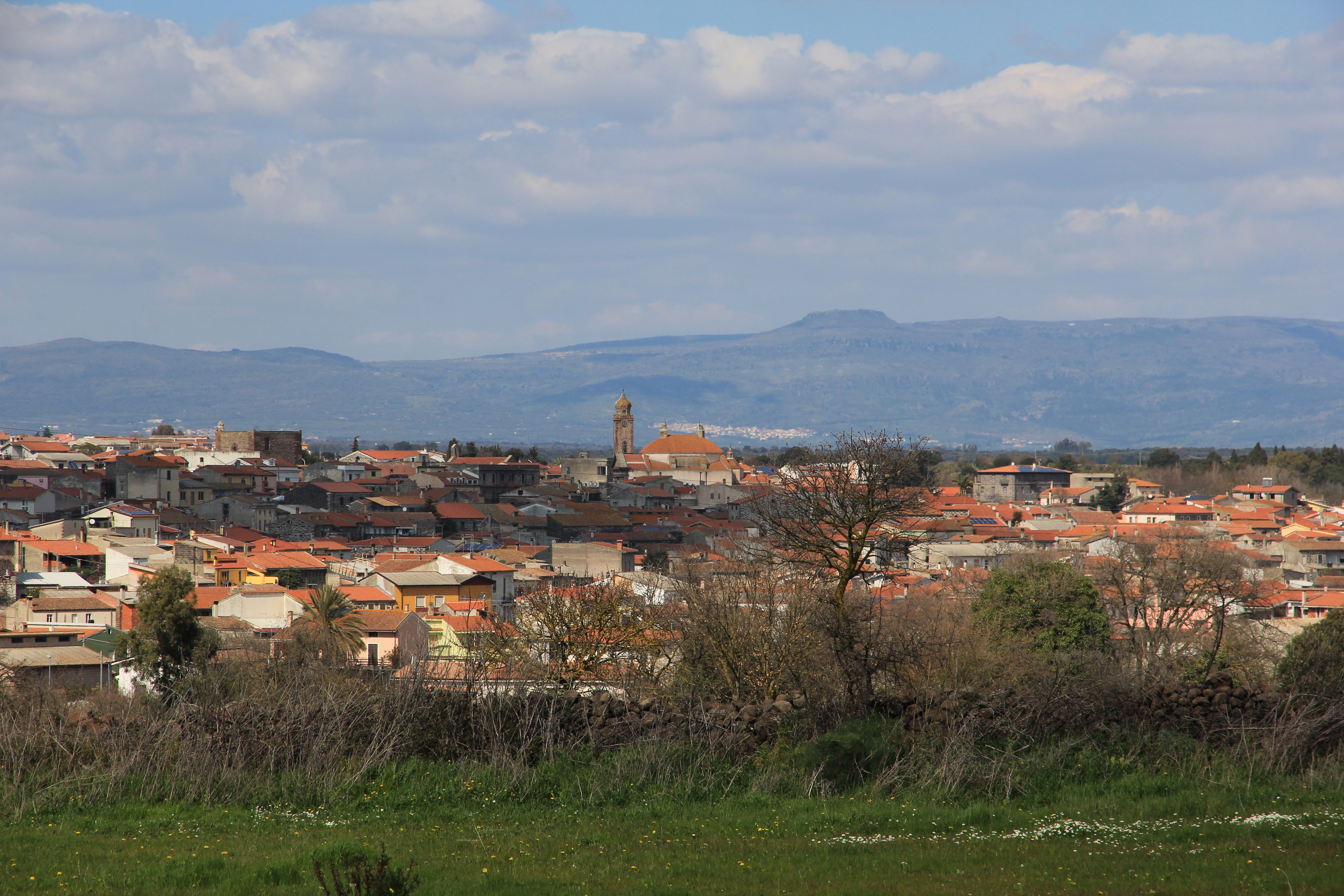
- Panorama

- Coat of arms

- Location within Sardinia
- Coordinates: 40°7′N 8°50′E
- Country: Italy
- Region: Sardinia
- Province: Oristano (OR)
- Frazioni: Zuri

Government
  - Mayor: Alessandro Marco Defrassu

Area
  - Total: 55.46 km^{2} (21.41 sq mi)

Population (31 August 2017)
  - Total: 4,464
  - Density: 80.49/km^{2} (208.5/sq mi)
- Demonym(s): Ghilarzesi; Ilartzesos
- Time zone: UTC+1 (CET)
  - Summer (DST): UTC+2 (CEST)
- Postal code: 09074
- Dialing code: 0785
- Patron saint: St. Macarius
- Saint day: 19 January
- Website: Official website

Ghilarza (Sardinian: Ilàrtzi) is a comune (municipality) in the Province of Oristano in the Italian region Sardinia, located about 100 kilometres (62 mi) north of Cagliari and about 30 kilometres (19 mi) northeast of Oristano.

Antonio Gramsci, political philosopher and founder of the Italian Communist Party, lived with his family in Ghilarza from about 1897 to 1908.

The ancestors of the American astronaut Wally Schirra were native of Ghilarza, before migrating to Switzerland and then to USA.

The town's sights include the 13th century Romanesque church of San Palmerio, in white-black trachite, and the 15th century Aragonese Tower.

== History ==
The foundation of the town dates back to the Nuragic period. Ghilarza then experienced Phoenician, Roman and Byzantine dominations. During the Middle Ages the town was part of Giudicato of Arborea, one of the Sardinian Kingdoms that gained effective independence from Byzantium.
