= Tonara =

- Comune
- Comune di Tonara
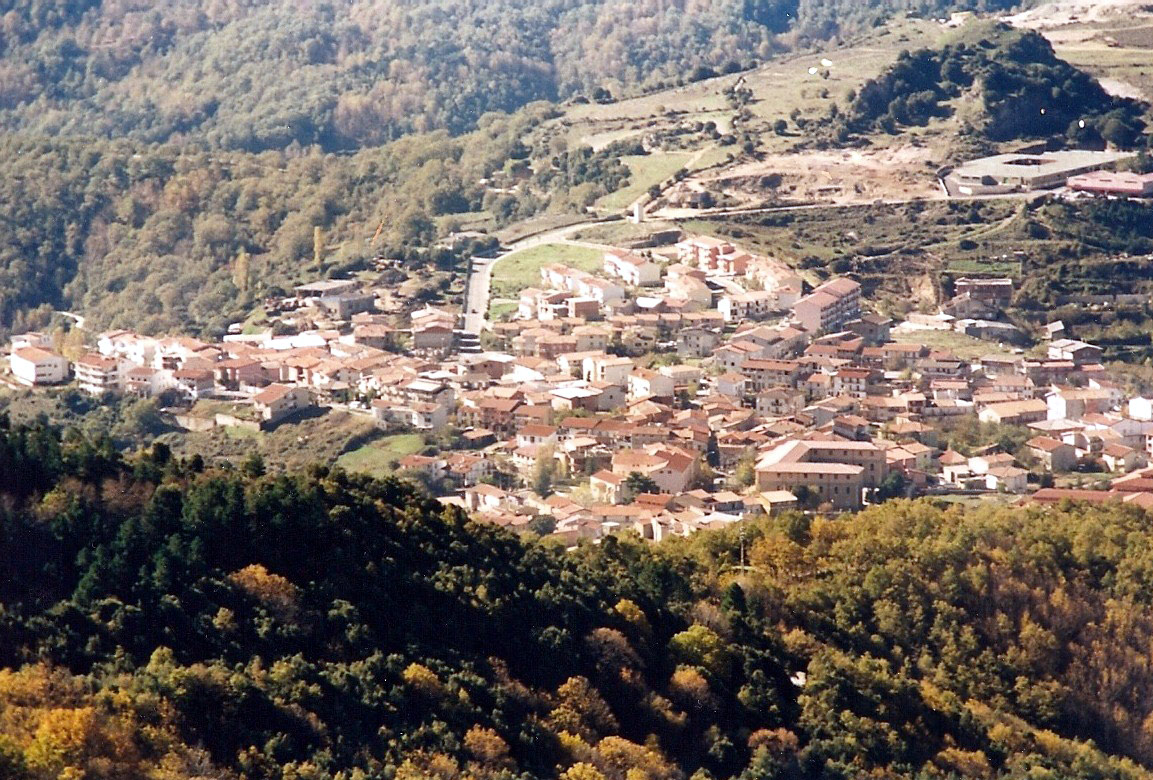
- View of Tonara

- Location within Sardinia
- Coordinates: 40°1′N 9°10′E
- Country: Italy
- Region: Sardinia
- Province: Nuoro (NU)
- Frazioni: Arasulè, Su Pranu, Toneri, Teliseri, Ilalà (abbandonato)

Area
  - Total: 52.02 km^{2} (20.09 sq mi)

Population (2026)
  - Total: 1,806
  - Density: 34.72/km^{2} (89.92/sq mi)
- Demonym: tonaresi
- Time zone: UTC+1 (CET)
  - Summer (DST): UTC+2 (CEST)
- Postal code: 08039
- Dialing code: 0784

Tonara is a town and comune (municipality) in the Province of Nuoro in the autonomous island region of Sardinia in Italy, located about 90 kilometres (56 mi) north of Cagliari and about 35 kilometres (22 mi) southwest of Nuoro. It has 1,806 inhabitants.

The municipality of Tonara contains the frazioni (subdivisions, mainly villages, and hamlets) Arasulè, Su Pranu, Toneri, Teliseri, and Ilalà (abandoned).

Tonara borders the municipalities of Austis, Belvì, Desulo, Sorgono, and Tiana.

== Demographics ==
As of 2026, the population is 1,806, of which 53.0% are male, and 47.0% are female. Minors make up 10.8% of the population, and seniors make up 30.5%.

Historical population

Year	Pop.	±%
1861	2,525	—
1871	2,513	−0.5%
1881	2,581	+2.7%
1901	2,973	+15.2%
1911	3,161	+6.3%
1921	2,943	−6.9%
1931	3,171	+7.7%
1936	3,362	+6.0%

Year	Pop.	±%
1951	3,304	−1.7%
1961	3,446	+4.3%
1971	2,649	−23.1%
1981	2,616	−1.2%
1991	2,518	−3.7%
2001	2,397	−4.8%
2011	2,116	−11.7%
2021	1,812	−14.4%

Source: ISTAT

=== Immigration ===
As of 2025, immigrants make up 6.3% of the population. The 5 largest foreign countries of birth are Morocco, Pakistan, Burkina Faso, Benin, and France.
