= Ortueri =

- Comune
- Comune di Ortueri
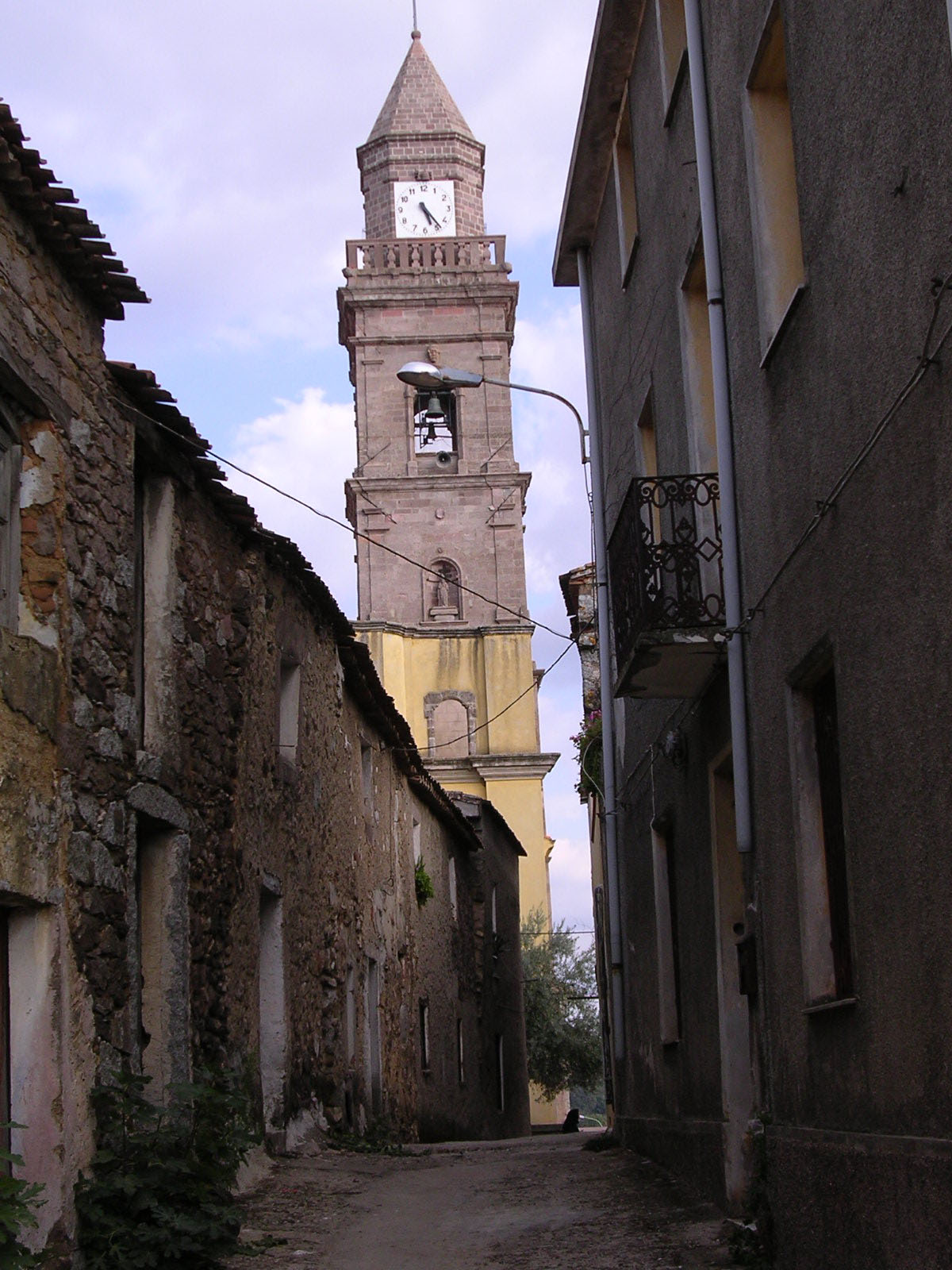
- The bell tower of San Nicola Church, Ortueri

- Location within Sardinia
- Coordinates: 40°02′08″N 8°59′11″E
- Country: Italy
- Region: Sardinia
- Province: Nuoro (NU)

Government
  - Mayor: Pierluigi Corriga

Area
  - Total: 38.83 km^{2} (14.99 sq mi)
- Elevation: 584 m (1,916 ft)

Population (2026)
  - Total: 961
  - Density: 24.7/km^{2} (64.1/sq mi)
- Demonym(s): Ortueresi, Ortueresos
- Time zone: UTC+1 (CET)
  - Summer (DST): UTC+2 (CEST)
- Postal code: 08036
- Dialing code: 0784
- Website: Official website

Ortueri is a town and comune (municipality) in the Province of Nuoro in the autnomous island region of Sardinia in Italy, located about 90 kilometres (56 mi) north of Cagliari and about 45 kilometres (28 mi) southwest of Nuoro. It has 961 inhabitants.

Ortueri borders the municipalities of Austis, Busachi, Neoneli, Samugheo, Sorgono, and Ula Tirso.

== Demographics ==
As of 2026, the population is 961, of which 50.8% are male, and 49.2% are female. Minors make up 8.8% of the population, and seniors make up 36.0%.

Historical population

Year	Pop.	±%
1861	1,643	—
1871	1,693	+3.0%
1881	1,779	+5.1%
1901	1,980	+11.3%
1911	2,006	+1.3%
1921	1,834	−8.6%
1931	2,015	+9.9%
1936	2,040	+1.2%

Year	Pop.	±%
1951	2,236	+9.6%
1961	2,312	+3.4%
1971	1,906	−17.6%
1981	1,794	−5.9%
1991	1,597	−11.0%
2001	1,435	−10.1%
2011	1,262	−12.1%
2021	1,049	−16.9%

Source: ISTAT

=== Immigration ===
As of 2025, immigrants make up 4.9% of the population. The 5 largest foreign countries of birth are Germany, Romania, France, Belgium, and Indonesia.
