= Samugheo =

- Comune
- Comune di Samugheo
- Location within Sardinia
- Coordinates: 39°57′N 8°57′E
- Country: Italy
- Region: Sardinia
- Province: Oristano (OR)

Government
  - Mayor: Antonello Demelas

Area
  - Total: 81.28 km^{2} (31.38 sq mi)
- Elevation: 370 m (1,210 ft)

Population (30 November 2017)
  - Total: 3,019
  - Density: 37.14/km^{2} (96.20/sq mi)
- Demonym: Samughesi
- Time zone: UTC+1 (CET)
  - Summer (DST): UTC+2 (CEST)
- Postal code: 09086
- Dialing code: 0783
- Website: Official website

Samugheo is a comune (municipality) in the Province of Oristano in the Italian region Sardinia, located about 80 kilometres (50 mi) north of Cagliari and about 30 kilometres (19 mi) east of Oristano.

Samugheo borders the following municipalities: Allai, Asuni, Atzara, Busachi, Laconi, Meana Sardo, Ortueri, Ruinas, Sorgono.

== Brief history ==
The territory has been settled since Neolithic times, as shown by the domus de Janas at Spelunca Orre. The most important Bronze Age remains are the Giants' tomb of Paule Luturu and the Perda Orrubia nuraghes. Clear traces remain of the Byzantine period, in the form of religious customs and Medusa Castle, named for the legend of Queen Medusa. The fortress clings to a cliff face, entirely dug out of the marble. It was first built in the 4th-5th centuries and construction continued in phases up to the 12th century. The remains are considerably overgrown, but you can still spot areas of walls, a cistern and the remains of two towers. Religious buildings include the 16th century Church of San Basilio, patron saint of the town and who legend claims saved it from the plague, the Church of San Sebastiano, possibly from the 13th century and extended in the 15th century, with a Latin cross layout and late Gothic decorations, and the sanctuary of Santa Maria di Abbasassa, built 450 metres above sea level on the site of an ancient pagan temple. The oldest church is perhaps San Michele, now in ruins. The town's name was once thought to come from this church, known as San Migueu in Catalan and San Miguel in Castilian Spanish; however, a will by Ugone III (1336) referring to Sumugleo and another by the majore de Villa Summungleo (1388) have shown this to be false. The most famous festival is A Maimone, a Samugheo carnival with a display of masks from all over Barbagia. The bonfires of Sant’Antonio and San Sebastiano in mid-January lead into the carnival period.

== Textiles Craft Heritage ==
The town has a valuable textile craft heritage handed down over the centuries. Samugheo, a town of around 3,000 inhabitants in the Mandrolisai area, in the province of Oristano, is known for its production of rugs, tapestries and traditional clothing. It is part of the Borghi Autentici d’Italia circuit and is set in the lush and rugged scenery of the Brabaxianna (‘gateway to Barbagia’), among solitary hills, crevasses, rocky cliffs, springs, oak woods and Mediterranean brush. There are numerous caves: ‘dell’Aquila’, sa Conca ‘e su Cuaddu, and the Buco della Chiave with its hour-glass shape.

The question we should be asking is not some much why Samugheo too but rather, why, out of all of Sardinia, it was only in Samugheo that the art of weaving became so deeply rooted leading to such particular developments. A rhetorical question which is impossible to answer. Vertical loom weaving was widespread throughout Sardinia as early as the pre-nuragic and nuragic ages, as can be seen by the warp weights found all over the area, including near Samugheo, where spindles as well as weights have been brought to light.

In more recent history, weaving for personal use was, in Sardinia as in many other places, an extremely important part of the feudal economy, and one performed for the most part, by women. Mothers taught their daughters to spin and weave, while the art of dyeing the fibres and the secret behind the decorative patterns were often valued as genuine family property. Daughters, after learning the art, soon began to put it into practice, making their dowries for a future marriage. These included blankets, sheets, towels, coffin covers, work aprons, napkins for bread, shirt cloth and also a knapsack to give to their future husband.

Angius tells us that in Samugheo, even in the mid-19th century, weaving was done on a horizontal frame, not just for family requirements but also for the market, and he attributes this to the hard work of the town’s inhabitants. The vast amount of available raw materials must also have had some influence, seeing that there was no real shortage of sheep for wool or of water to macerate linen stems.

What we do know is that between the 1950s and 1960s, Samugheo was a flourishing centre for textile manufacture, to the great benefit of the local economy. The techniques used were the same as in the rest of Sardinia, but in Samugheo, they also used the older method of un’in dente, with established variations including grained a pibiones, created from loops projecting from the backing cloth and using a metal rod. The group of raised knots that were formed would create the decorative design of the item and at the same time, strengthen the fabric, ensuring greater resistance to wear. This marked the start of a style that even today, is what springs to many people’s minds when Sardinian weaving is mentioned.

Since then the woven textiles from Samugheo have had excellent success in the marketplace, to the extent that artisanal weaving has become the driving force of the local economy. Currently, the items in most demand are – besides rugs, bags, table linens, sheets and towels – curtains, bedroom coordinates, lamps, wall hangings, rugs, centrepieces for tables, and tapestries.
