= Giovanni Melis Fois =

Italian Prelate

- Bishop of Nuoro (Emeritus)
- Church: Roman Catholic Church
- See: Diocese of Nuoro
- In office: 1970 -1992
- Predecessor: Giuseppe Melas
- Successor: Pietro Melon
- Previous posts: Diocese of Tempio-Ampurias; Bishop

Orders
- Ordination: August 12, 1939

Personal details
- Born: October 7, 1916 Sorgono, Italy
- Died: September 3, 2009 (aged 92)

Giovanni Melis Fois (October 7, 1916 – September 3, 2009) was an Italian Prelate of Roman Catholic Church.

Fois was born in Sorgono, Italy and ordained a priest on August 13, 1939 from the Archidocese of Oristano. On May 25, 1963, he was appointed bishop of the Diocese of Tempio-Ampurias and ordained bishop July 28, 1963. Fois was then appointed to bishop of the Diocese of Nuoro November 1, 1970 where he remained until retirement on April 16, 1992.

== See also ==
- Roman Catholic Archdiocese of Pescara-Penne
