= Atzara =

Atzara Atzàra (Sardinian)
- Comune
- Comune di Atzara
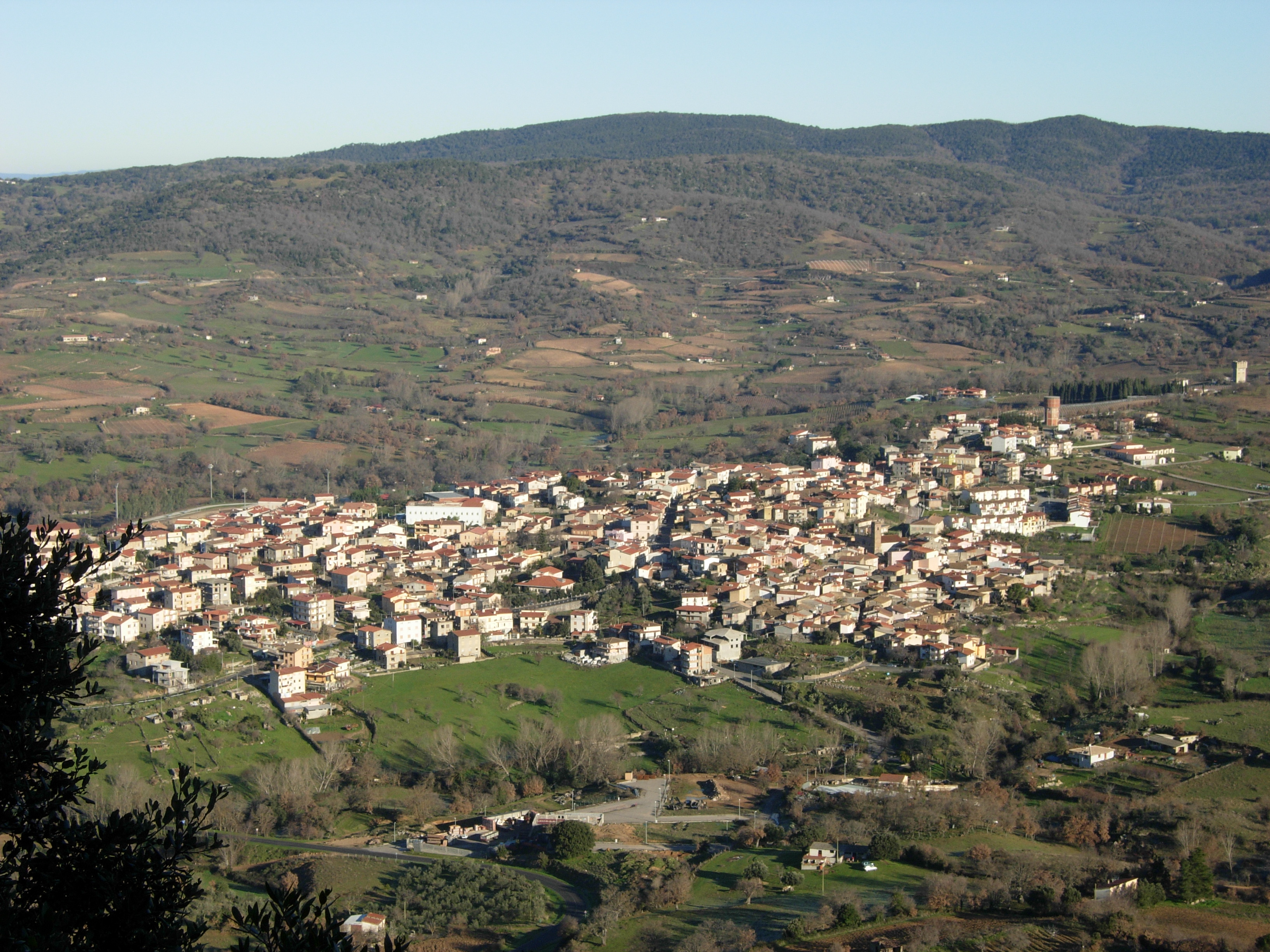
- View of Atzara

- Location of Atzara in Sardinia
- Coordinates: 39°59′33″N 9°4′34″E
- Country: Italy
- Region: Sardinia
- Province: Province of Nuoro

Government
  - Mayor: Alessandro Corona

Area
  - Total: 35.92 km^{2} (13.87 sq mi)
- Elevation: 553 m (1,814 ft)

Population (2026)
  - Total: 974
  - Density: 27.1/km^{2} (70.2/sq mi)
- Demonym: Atzaresi (Sardinian: Atzaresos)
- Time zone: UTC+1 (CET)
  - Summer (DST): UTC+2 (CEST)
- Postal code: 08030
- Dialing code: 0784
- Website: Official website

Atzara (Sardinian: Atzàra) is a town and comune (municipality) in the Province of Nuoro in the autonomous island region of Sardinia in Italy, located about 90 kilometres (56 mi) north of Cagliari and about 45 kilometres (28 mi) southwest of Nuoro. It has 974 inhabitants.

Atzara borders the municipalities of Belvì, Meana Sardo, Samugheo, and Sorgono.

It is one of I Borghi più belli d'Italia ("The most beautiful villages of Italy").

== History ==
Located in Barbagia, the original village date back to the years around 1000 and developed near the spring of Bingia de giosso, still existing. The old town centre is divided in the ancient districts of Su Fruscu, Lodine, Montiga e Josso, Montiga e Susu, Sa Cora Manna, Su Cuccuru de Santu Giorgi and Tzùri. It was part of the Giudicato of Arborea.

== Demographics ==
As of 2026, the population is 974, of which 50.8% are male, and 49.2% are female. Minors make up 9.3% of the population, and seniors make up 37.4%.

Historical population

| Year | Pop. | ±% |
|---|---|---|
| 1861 | 1,607 | — |
| 1871 | 1,469 | −8.6% |
| 1881 | 1,610 | +9.6% |
| 1901 | 1,462 | −9.2% |
| 1911 | 1,359 | −7.0% |
| 1921 | 1,332 | −2.0% |
| 1931 | 1,366 | +2.6% |
| 1936 | 1,404 | +2.8% |

| Year | Pop. | ±% |
|---|---|---|
| 1951 | 1,595 | +13.6% |
| 1961 | 1,715 | +7.5% |
| 1971 | 1,490 | −13.1% |
| 1981 | 1,366 | −8.3% |
| 1991 | 1,332 | −2.5% |
| 2001 | 1,310 | −1.7% |
| 2011 | 1,210 | −7.6% |
| 2021 | 1,026 | −15.2% |

Source: ISTAT

=== Immigration ===
As of 2025, immigrants make up 4.0% of the population. The 5 largest foreign countries of birth are Romania, Germany, France, Switzerland, and Morocco.

== Gallery ==
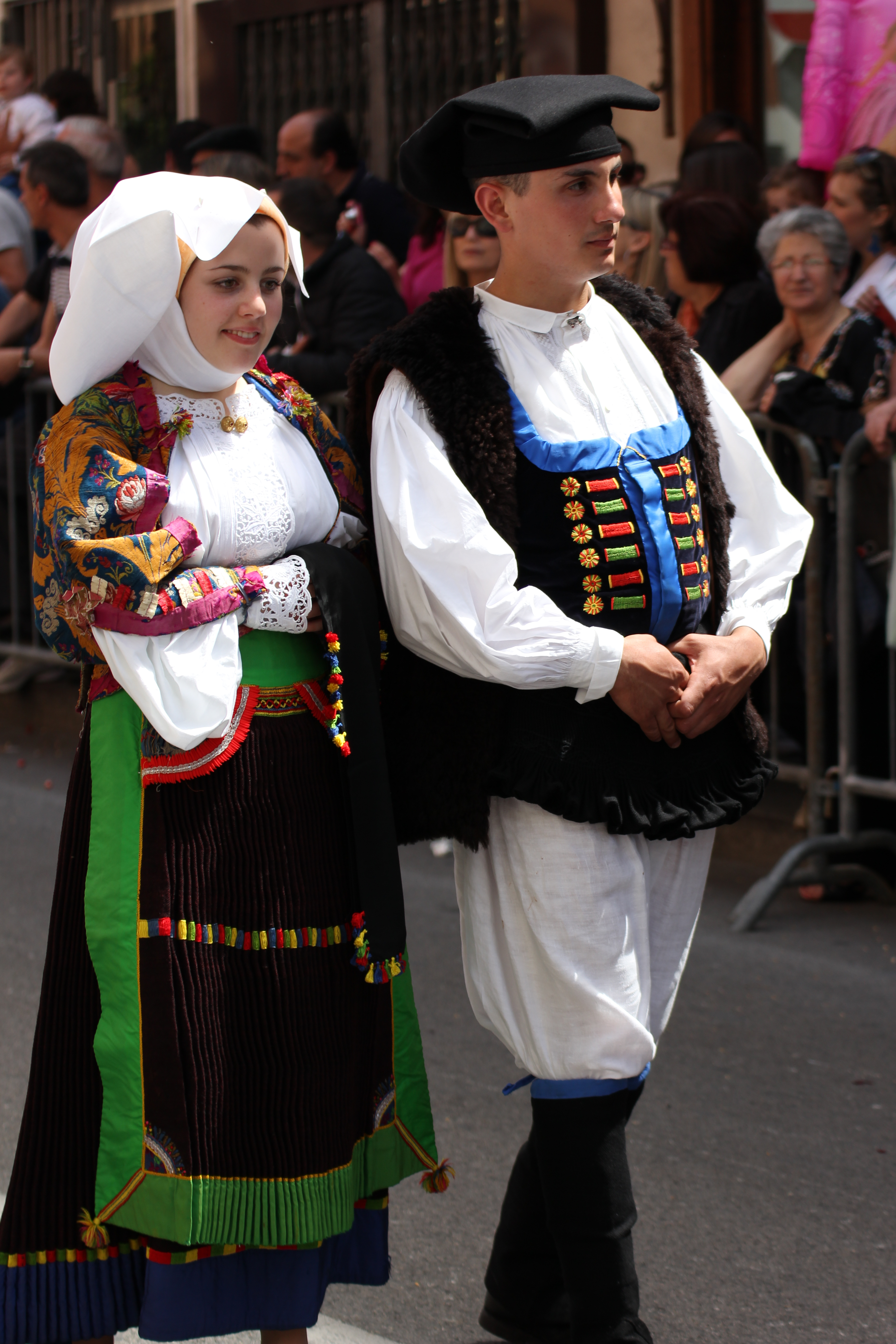
Traditional costumes of Atzara

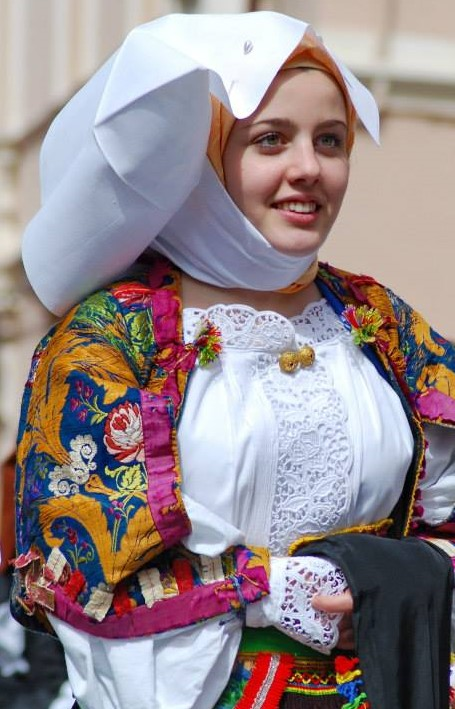
Traditional female costume of Atzara

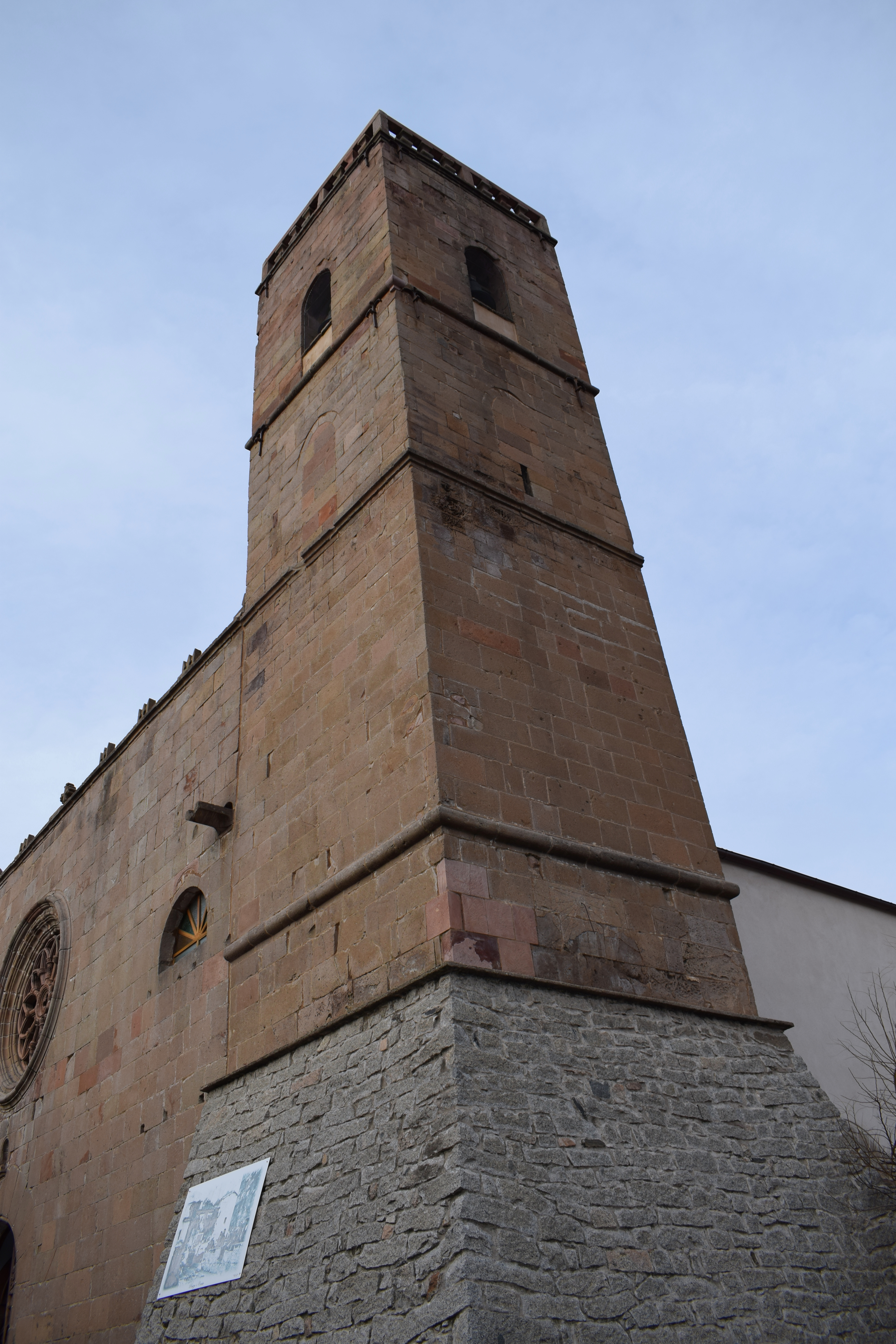
The bell tower of the parish church

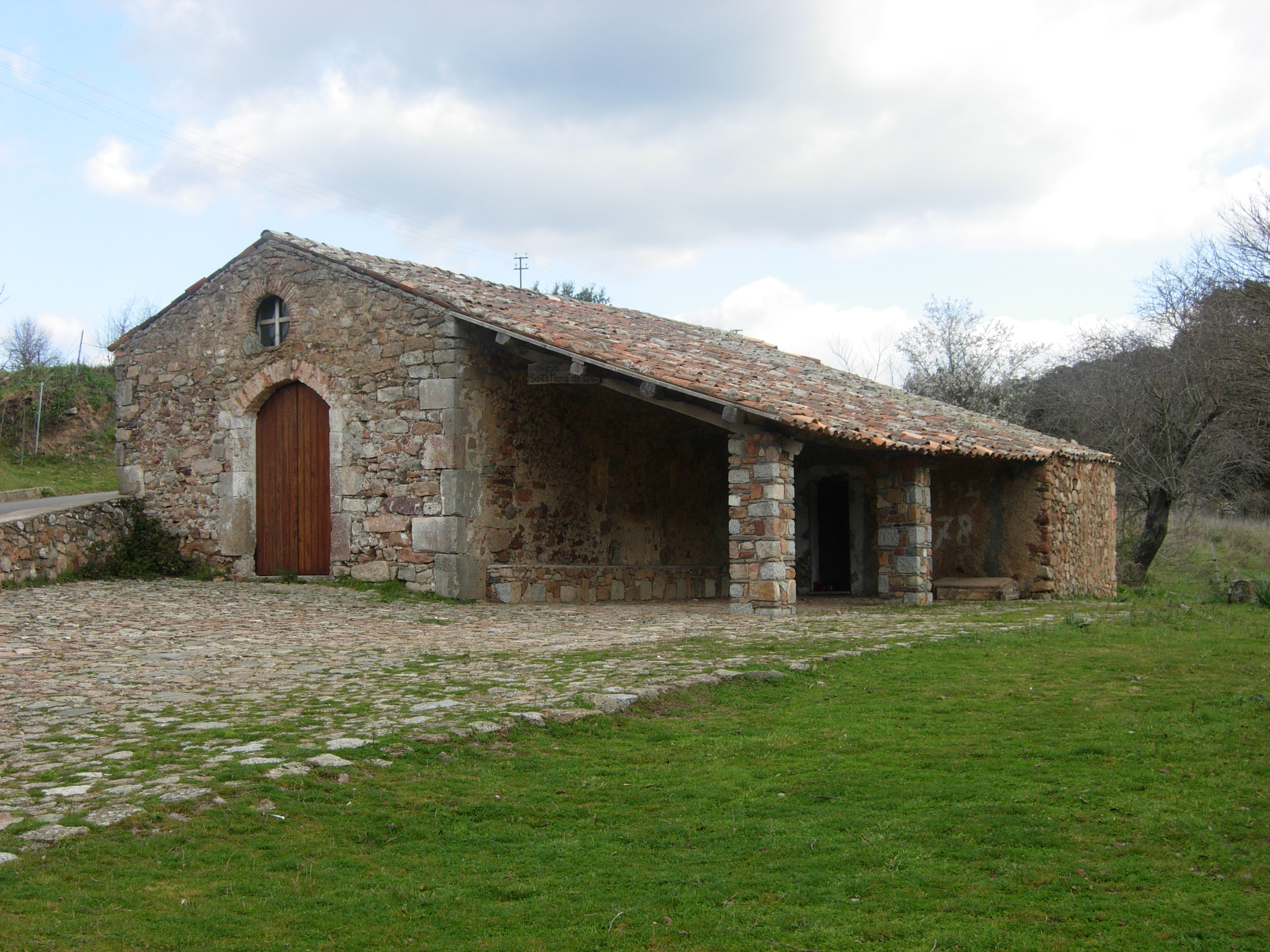
Church of Santa Maria 'e Susu

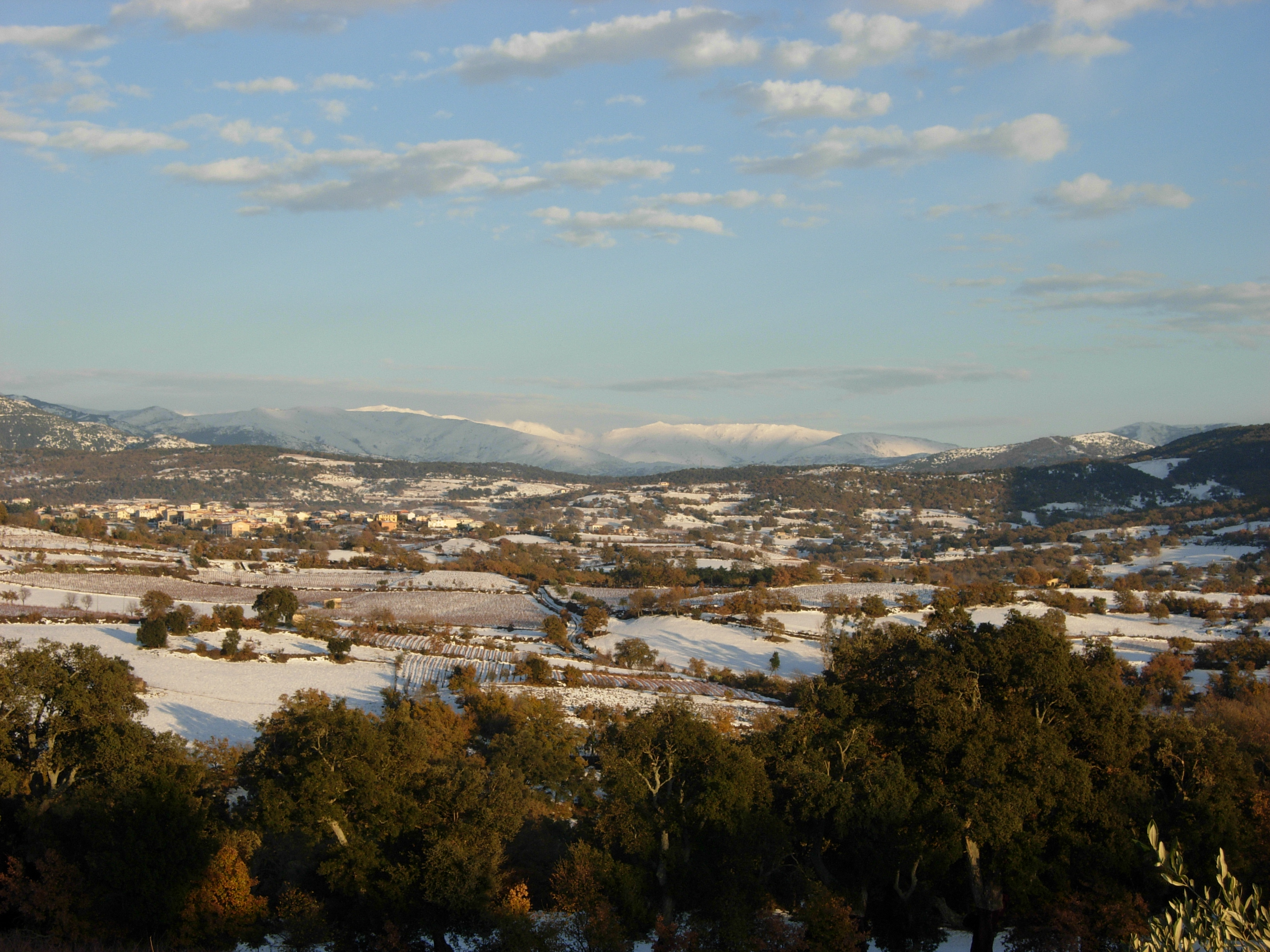
Atzara in the winter
