= Teti, Sardinia =

Teti
- Comune
- Comune di Teti
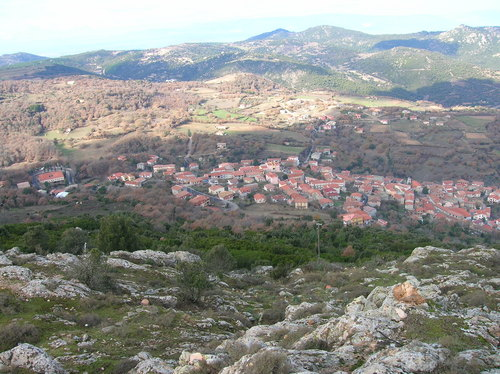
- View of Teti from Punta Sa Marghine

- Location within Sardinia
- Coordinates: 40°6′N 9°7′E
- Country: Italy
- Region: Sardinia
- Province: Nuoro (NU)

Area
  - Total: 43.80 km^{2} (16.91 sq mi)
- Elevation: 714 m (2,343 ft)

Population (2026)
  - Total: 561
  - Density: 12.8/km^{2} (33.2/sq mi)
- Time zone: UTC+1 (CET)
  - Summer (DST): UTC+2 (CEST)
- Postal code: 08030
- Dialing code: 0784

Teti is a village and comune (municipality) in the Province of Nuoro in the autonomous island region of Sardinia in Italy, located about 100 kilometres (62 mi) north of Cagliari and about 30 kilometres (19 mi) southwest of Nuoro. It has 561 inhabitants.

Teti borders the municipalities of Austis, Ollolai, Olzai, Ovodda, and Tiana.

== Demographics ==
As of 2026, the population is 561, of which 53.7% are male, and 46.3% are female. Minors make up 12.5% of the population, and seniors make up 31.0%.

Historical population

| Year | Pop. | ±% |
|---|---|---|
| 1861 | 445 | — |
| 1871 | 464 | +4.3% |
| 1881 | 474 | +2.2% |
| 1901 | 544 | +14.8% |
| 1911 | 615 | +13.1% |
| 1921 | 646 | +5.0% |
| 1931 | 749 | +15.9% |
| 1936 | 769 | +2.7% |

| Year | Pop. | ±% |
|---|---|---|
| 1951 | 909 | +18.2% |
| 1961 | 1,057 | +16.3% |
| 1971 | 807 | −23.7% |
| 1981 | 867 | +7.4% |
| 1991 | 866 | −0.1% |
| 2001 | 807 | −6.8% |
| 2011 | 690 | −14.5% |
| 2021 | 610 | −11.6% |

Source: ISTAT

=== Immigration ===
As of 2025, immigrants make up 5.5% of the population. The 5 largest foreign countries of birth are Romania, Belgium, Morocco, Colombia, and Germany.
