= Desulo =

Desulo Dèsulu (Sardinian)
- Comune
- Comune di Desulo
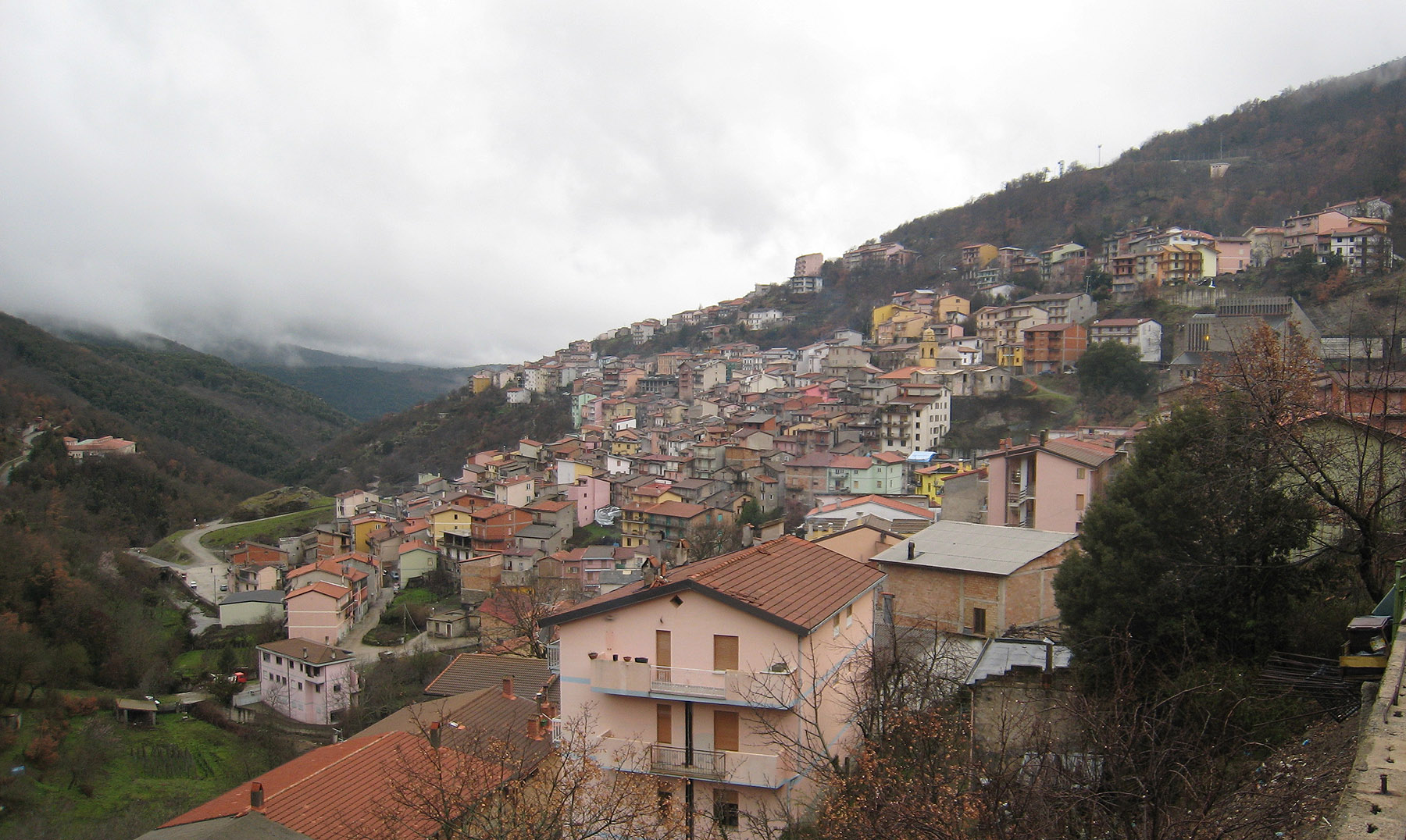
- View of Desulo

- Location within Sardinia
- Coordinates: 40°0′N 9°14′E
- Country: Italy
- Region: Sardinia
- Province: Nuoro (NU)
- Frazioni: Issiria, Ovolaccio, Asuai

Government
  - Mayor: Gian Luigi Littarru

Area
  - Total: 74.50 km^{2} (28.76 sq mi)
- Elevation: 886 m (2,907 ft)

Population (2026)
  - Total: 1,995
  - Density: 26.78/km^{2} (69.36/sq mi)
- Demonym: Desulesi
- Time zone: UTC+1 (CET)
  - Summer (DST): UTC+2 (CEST)
- Postal code: 08032
- Dialing code: 0784
- Website: Official website

Desulo (Sardinian: Dèsulu) is a town and comune (municipality) in the Province of Nuoro in the autonomous island region of Sardinia in Italy, located about 90 kilometres (56 mi) north of Cagliari and about 35 kilometres (22 mi) south of Nuoro. It has 1,995 inhabitants.

Desulo borders the municipalities of Aritzo, Arzana, Belvì, Fonni, Ovodda, Tiana, Tonara, and Villagrande Strisaili.

== Demographics ==
As of 2026, the population is 1,995, of which 49.8% are male, and 50.2% are female. Minors make up 11.4% of the population, and seniors make up 29.4%.

Historical population

| Year | Pop. | ±% |
|---|---|---|
| 1861 | 2,101 | — |
| 1871 | 2,354 | +12.0% |
| 1881 | 2,385 | +1.3% |
| 1901 | 2,929 | +22.8% |
| 1911 | 3,208 | +9.5% |
| 1921 | 3,332 | +3.9% |
| 1931 | 3,647 | +9.5% |
| 1936 | 3,843 | +5.4% |

| Year | Pop. | ±% |
|---|---|---|
| 1951 | 4,077 | +6.1% |
| 1961 | 4,739 | +16.2% |
| 1971 | 4,293 | −9.4% |
| 1981 | 3,778 | −12.0% |
| 1991 | 3,213 | −15.0% |
| 2001 | 2,887 | −10.1% |
| 2011 | 2,465 | −14.6% |
| 2021 | 2,149 | −12.8% |

Source: ISTAT

=== Immigration ===
As of 2025, immigrants make up 1.1% of the population. The 5 largest foreign countries of birth are Romania, Germany, Switzerland, Argentina, and Hungary.

== Gallery ==
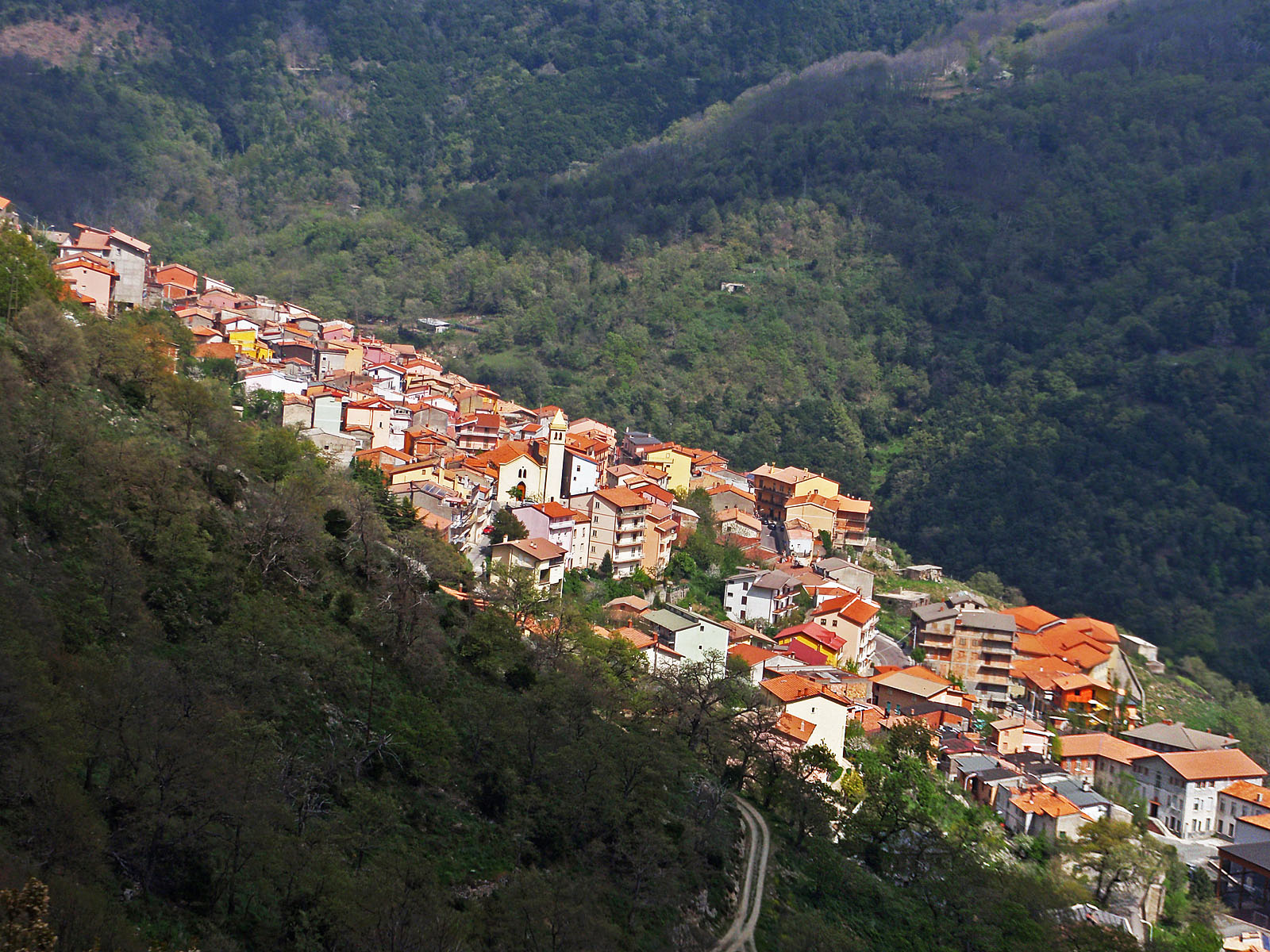
View of Desulo from the northeast

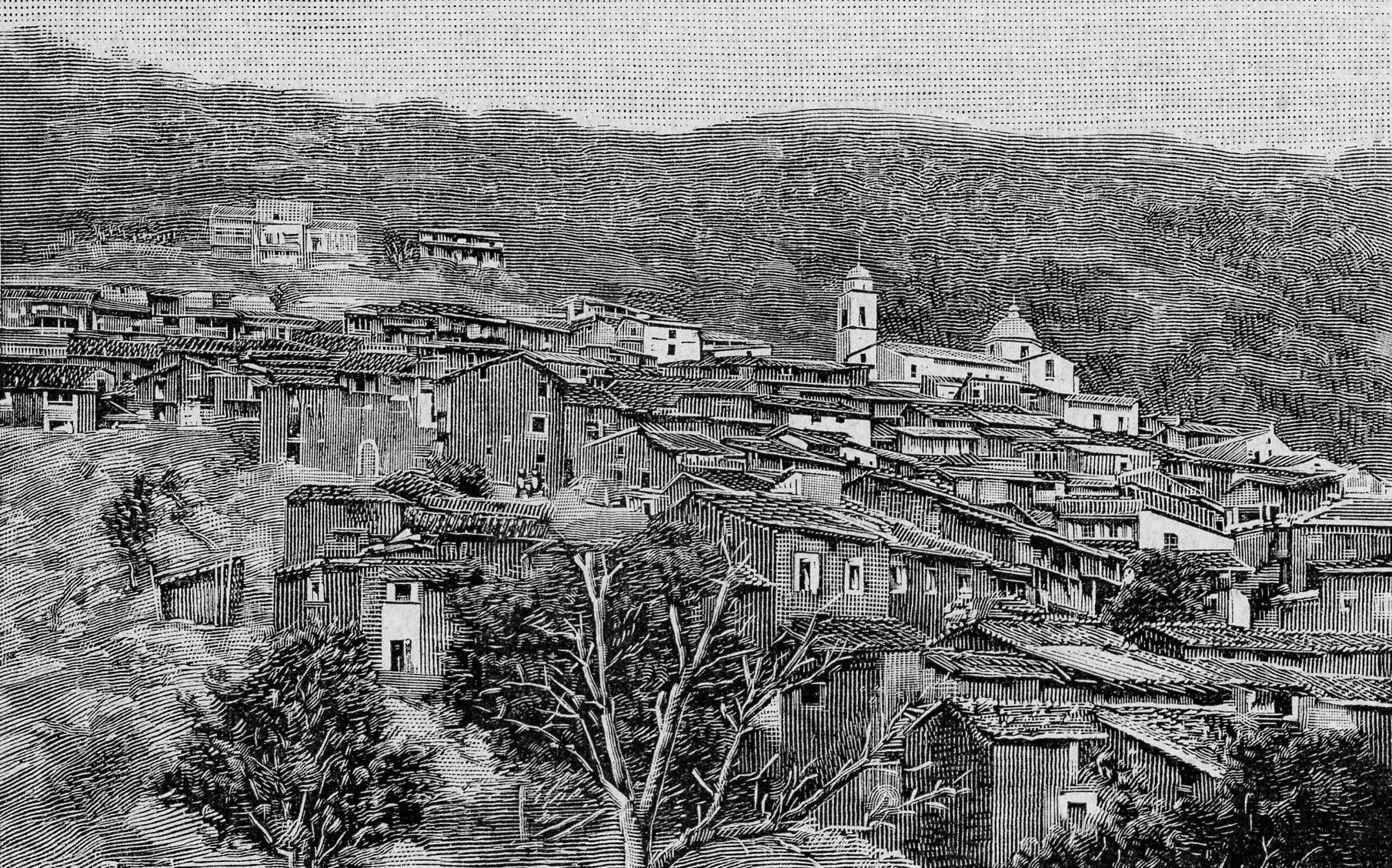
Desulo in 1901

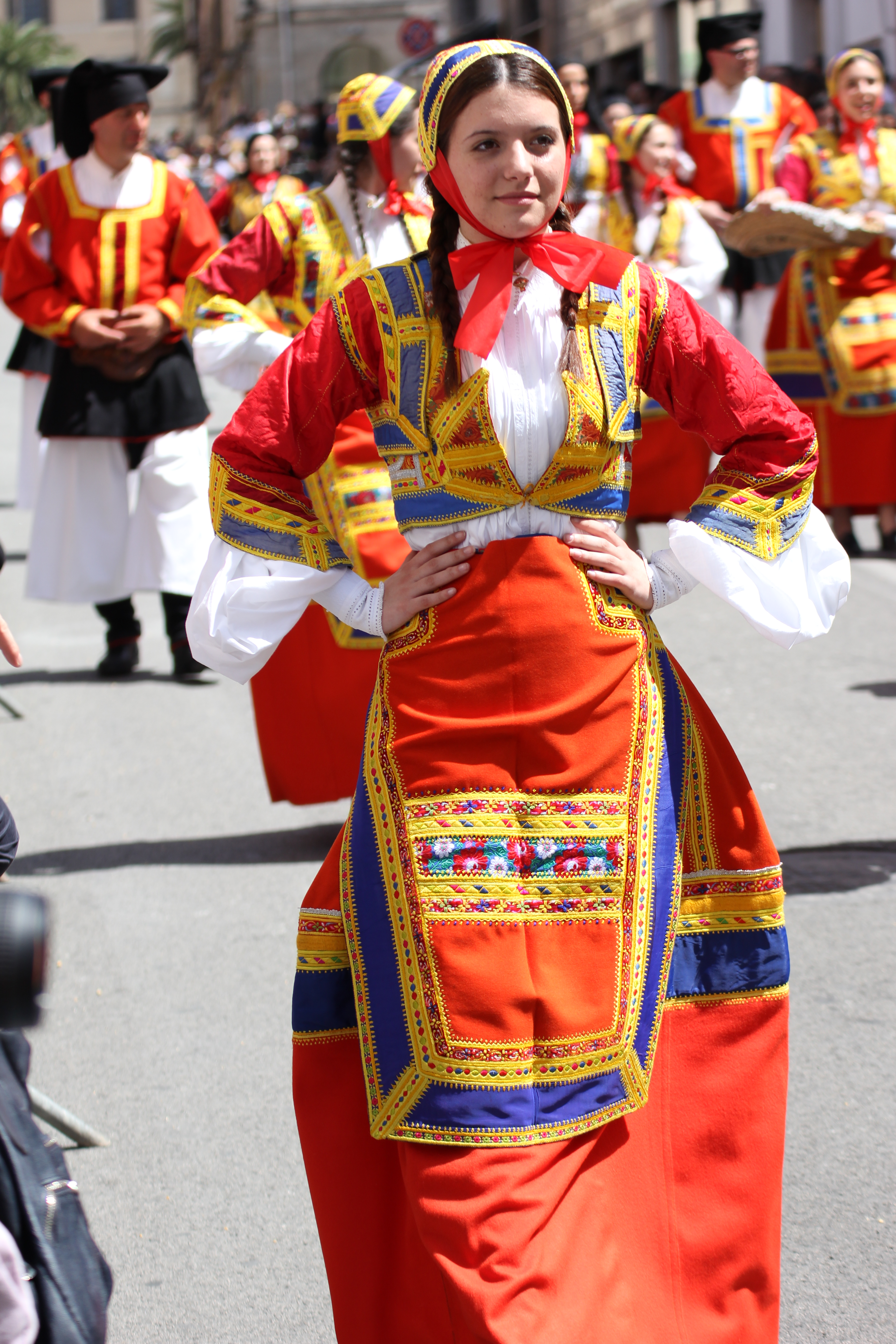
Traditional costumes of Desulo

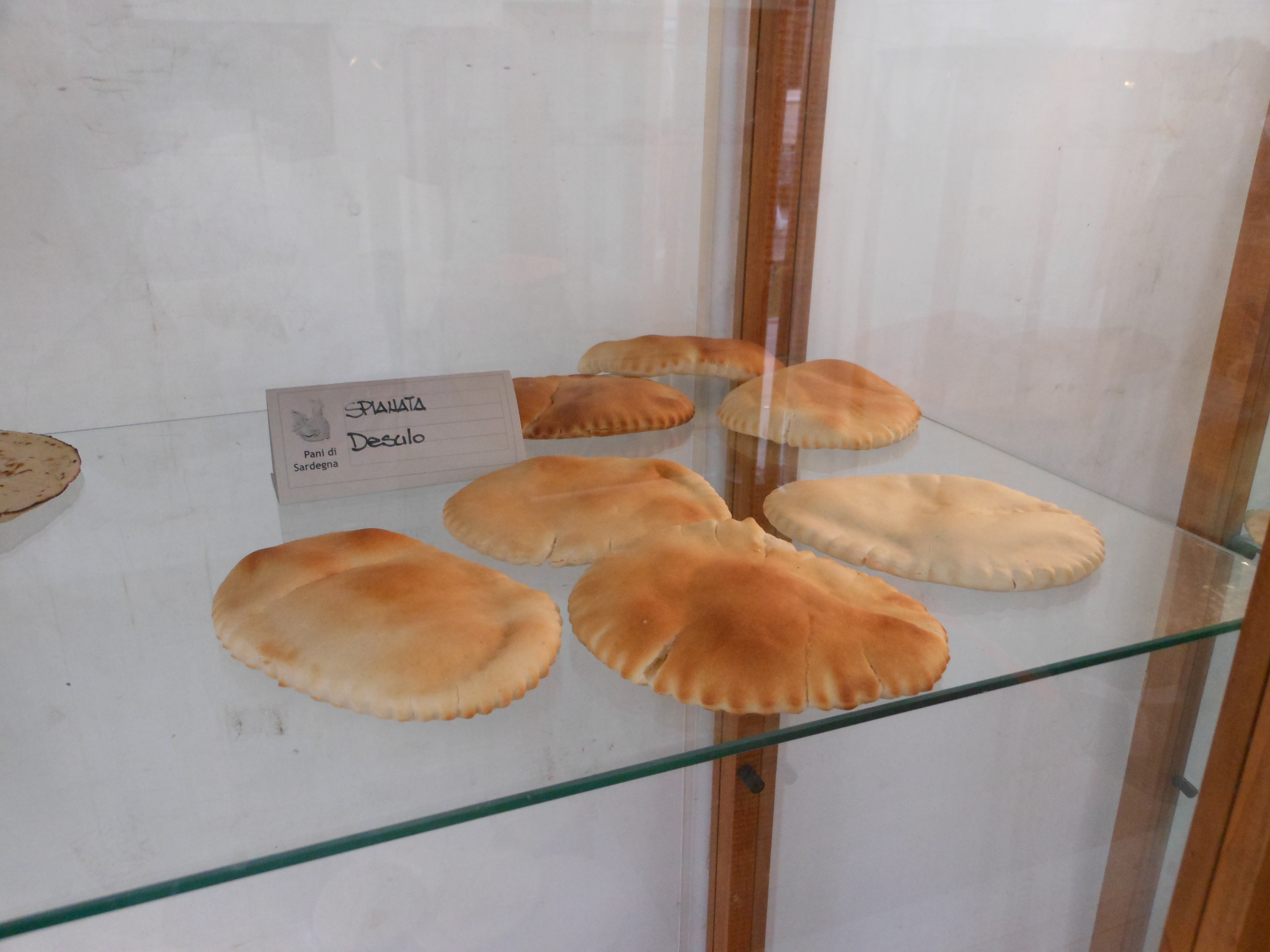
Spianata (Pane 'e poddine) of Desulo
