= Ula Tirso =

- Comune
- Comune di Ula Tirso
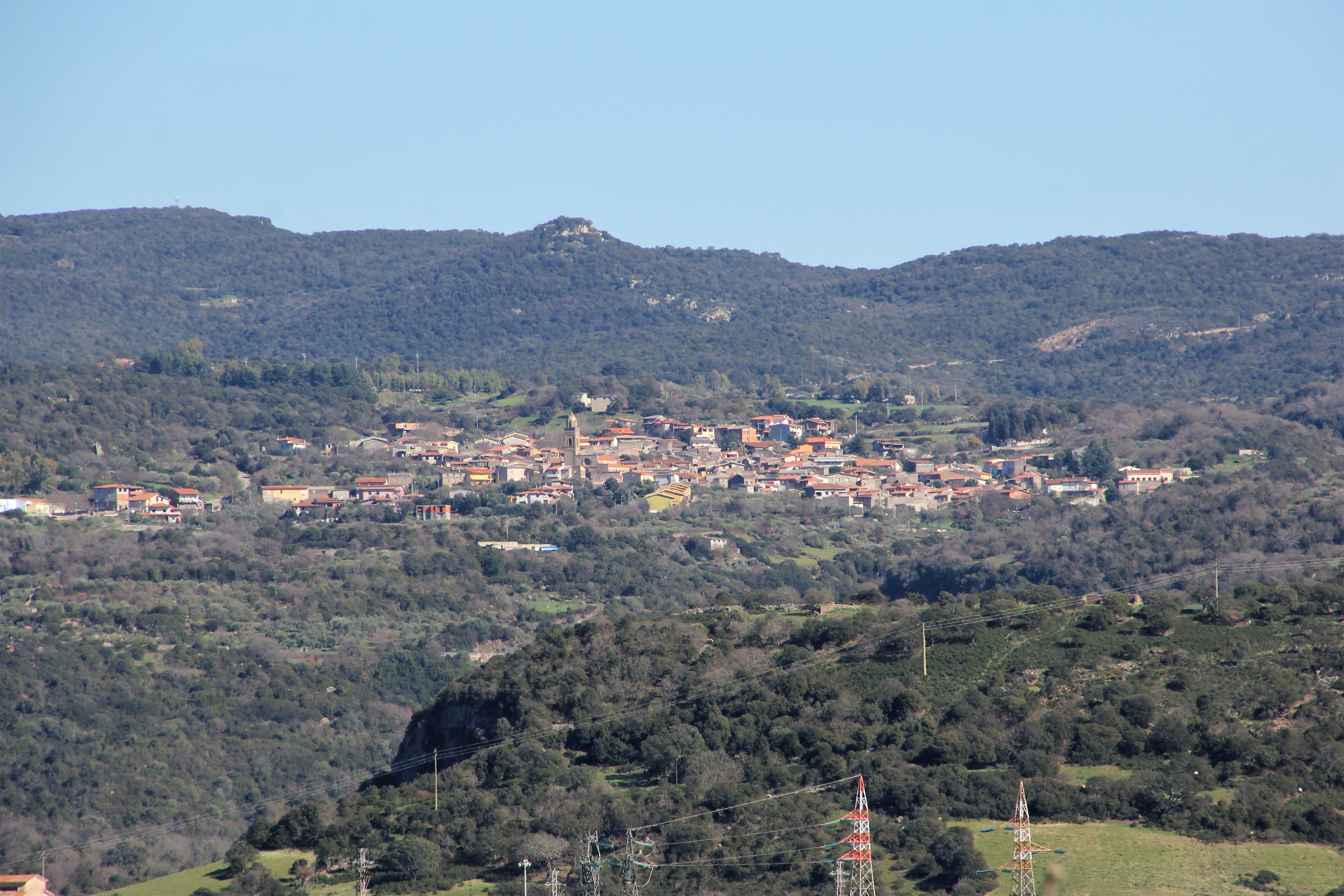

- Location within Sardinia
- Coordinates: 40°3′N 8°54′E
- Country: Italy
- Region: Sardinia
- Province: Province of Oristano (OR)

Area
  - Total: 18.8 km^{2} (7.3 sq mi)
- Elevation: 348 m (1,142 ft)

Population (Dec. 2004)
  - Total: 616
  - Density: 32.8/km^{2} (84.9/sq mi)
- Demonym: Ulesi
- Time zone: UTC+1 (CET)
  - Summer (DST): UTC+2 (CEST)
- Postal code: 09080
- Dialing code: 0783

Ula Tirso (in Sardinian language just Ula) is a comune (municipality) in the Province of Oristano in the Italian region Sardinia, located about 90 kilometres (56 mi) north of Cagliari and about 30 kilometres (19 mi) northeast of Oristano. As of 31 December 2004, it had a population of 616 and an area of 18.8 square kilometres (7.3 mi^{2}).

Ula Tirso borders the following municipalities: Ardauli, Busachi, Ghilarza, Neoneli, Ortueri.

== Demographic evolution ==
Historical population

Year	Pop.	±%
1861	827	—
1871	829	+0.2%
1881	851	+2.7%
1901	894	+5.1%
1911	892	−0.2%

Year	Pop.	±%
1921	948	+6.3%
1931	1,094	+15.4%
1936	1,149	+5.0%
1951	1,227	+6.8%
1961	1,268	+3.3%

Year	Pop.	±%
1971	980	−22.7%
1981	858	−12.4%
1991	687	−19.9%
2001	634	−7.7%

Source: Data from ISTAT
