= Fonni =

Fonni Fonne (Sardinian)
- Comune
- Comune di Fonni
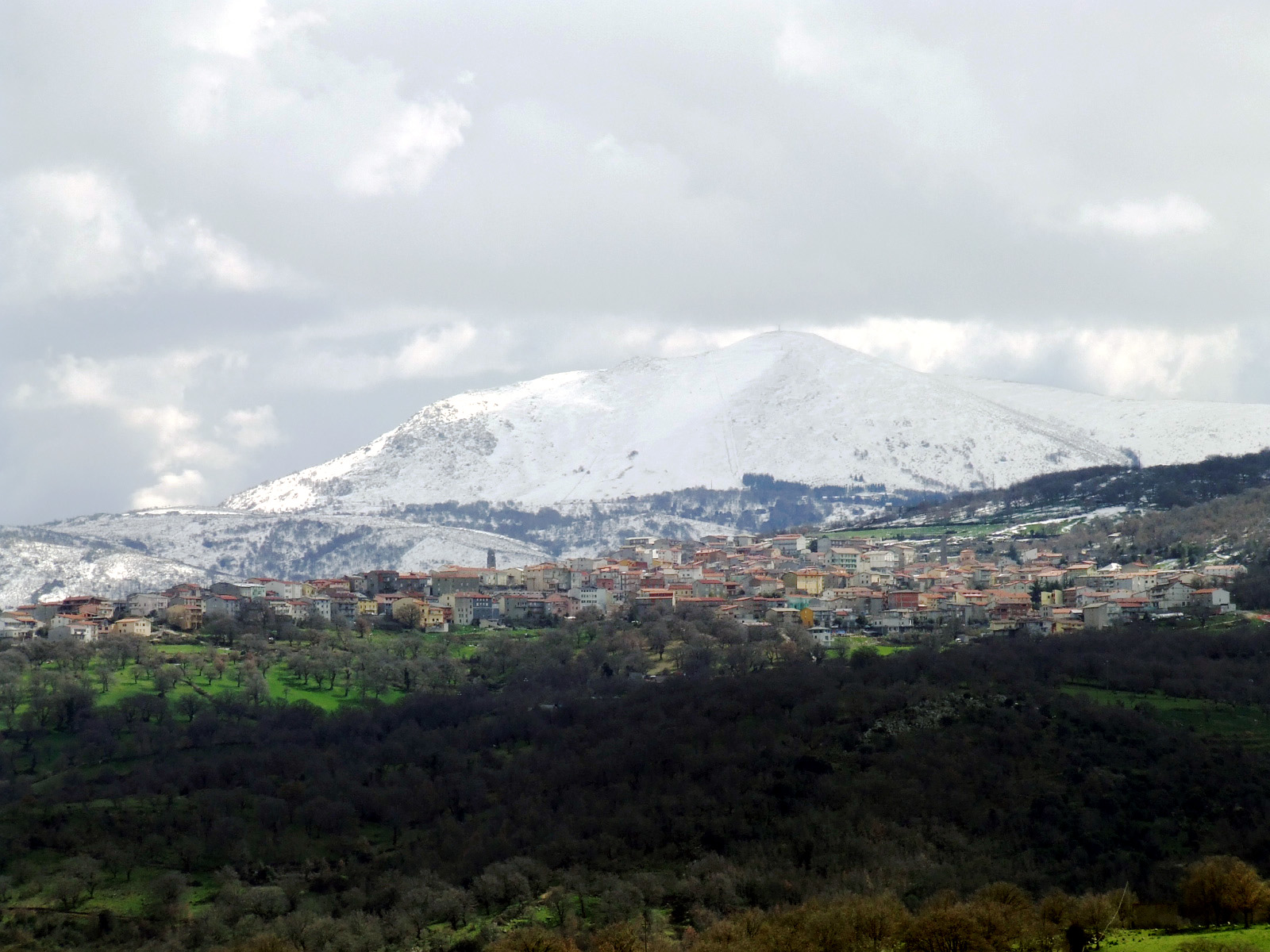
- Fonni and the Monte Spada in the background

- Location within Sardinia
- Coordinates: 40°07′N 09°15′E
- Country: Italy
- Region: Sardinia
- Province: Nuoro (NU)

Government
  - Mayor: Daniela Falconi

Area
  - Total: 112.27 km^{2} (43.35 sq mi)
- Elevation: 1,000 m (3,300 ft)

Population (2026)
  - Total: 3,552
  - Density: 31.64/km^{2} (81.94/sq mi)
- Demonyms: Fonnesi; Fonnesos
- Time zone: UTC+1 (CET)
  - Summer (DST): UTC+2 (CEST)
- Postal code: 08023
- Dialing code: 0784
- Patron saint: St. John the Baptist
- Saint day: June 24
- Website: Official website

Fonni (Sardinian: Fonne) is a town and comune (municipality) in the province of Nuoro in the autonomous island region of Sardinia in Italy, located about 100 kilometres (62 mi) north of Cagliari and about 20 kilometres (12 mi) southwest of Nuoro. It has 3,552 inhabitants.

It is the highest town in Sardinia, and situated among fine scenery with some chestnut woods. Fonni is a winter sports centre with a ski lift to Monte Spada and Bruncu Spina.

Fonni borders the municipalities of Desulo, Gavoi, Lodine, Mamoiada, Orgosolo, Ovodda, and Villagrande Strisaili.

== Etymology ==
The term "Fonni/-e" probably derives from the Latin fons, meaning "fountain" or "god of the sources". In fact the village contains numerous spring water fountains.

== Climate ==
Climate data for Fonni (1961–1990 normals)
Month	Jan	Feb	Mar	Apr	May	Jun	Jul	Aug	Sep	Oct	Nov	Dec	Year
Mean daily maximum °C (°F)	6.6 (43.9)	6.9 (44.4)	8.9 (48.0)	11.5 (52.7)	16.3 (61.3)	21.2 (70.2)	25.8 (78.4)	25.5 (77.9)	21.7 (71.1)	16.4 (61.5)	10.9 (51.6)	8.1 (46.6)	15.0 (59.0)
Mean daily minimum °C (°F)	1.5 (34.7)	1.2 (34.2)	2.5 (36.5)	4.6 (40.3)	8.5 (47.3)	12.6 (54.7)	16.4 (61.5)	16.3 (61.3)	13.7 (56.7)	9.7 (49.5)	5.4 (41.7)	2.8 (37.0)	7.9 (46.2)
Average precipitation mm (inches)	101.6 (4.00)	93.2 (3.67)	76.9 (3.03)	81.1 (3.19)	60.7 (2.39)	31.4 (1.24)	13.2 (0.52)	15.6 (0.61)	48.8 (1.92)	81.1 (3.19)	97.0 (3.82)	100.1 (3.94)	800.7 (31.52)
Average precipitation days (≥ 1.0 mm)	9.9	10.0	9.4	10.5	7.4	4.2	1.6	2.4	4.8	8.8	9.7	9.9	88.6
Average relative humidity (%)	86	88	83	81	81	77	64	69	75	82	88	86	80
Source: NOAA

== Demographics ==
As of 2026, the population is 3,552, of which 48.6% are male, and 51.4% are female. Minors make up 15.0% of the population, and seniors make up 28.3%.

Historical population

Year	Pop.	±%
1861	3,604	—
1871	3,839	+6.5%
1881	3,826	−0.3%
1901	4,323	+13.0%
1911	4,639	+7.3%
1921	4,833	+4.2%
1931	5,000	+3.5%
1936	4,844	−3.1%

Year	Pop.	±%
1951	5,195	+7.2%
1961	5,451	+4.9%
1971	5,101	−6.4%
1981	4,950	−3.0%
1991	4,654	−6.0%
2001	4,371	−6.1%
2011	4,062	−7.1%
2021	3,692	−9.1%

Source: ISTAT

=== Immigration ===
As of 2025, immigrants make up 2.0% of the population. The 5 largest foreign countries of birth are Belgium, Romania, France, Switzerland, and Albania.

== Neighborhoods ==
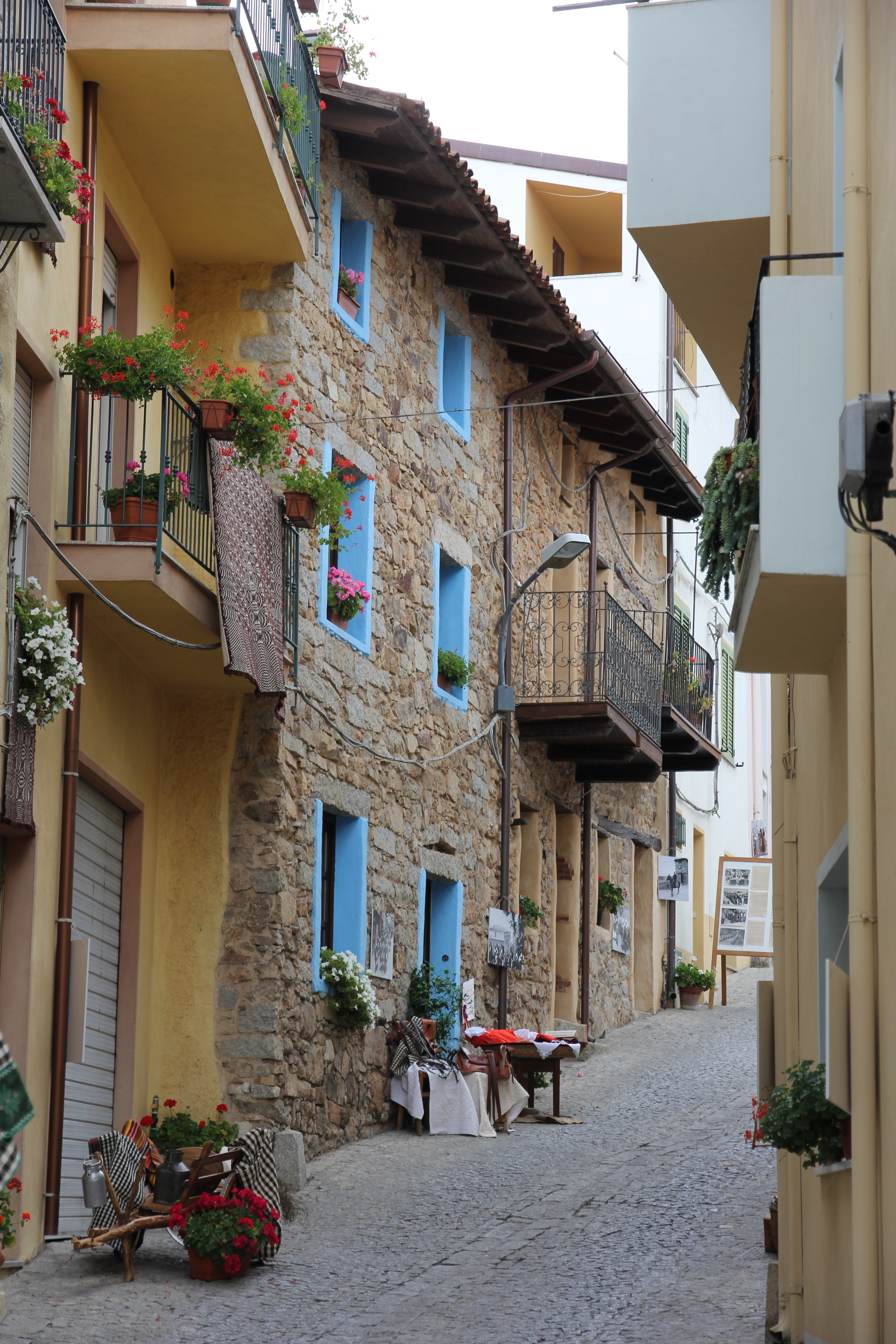
A traditional granite stone house in Fonni

Neighborhoods in Fonni are called "Rioni" of these the oldest is called su piggiu or the peak, probably derived by the fact this is the highest and first layer of the village. Others include puppuai and cresiedda to the south, and logotza to the east.

== Culture ==
The local costumes are extremely picturesque, and are well seen on the day of St John the Baptist, the patron saint. The men's costume is similar to that worn in the district generally; the linen trousers are long and black gaiters are worn. The women wear a white chemise; over that a very small corselet, and over that a red jacket with blue and black velvet facings. The skirt is brown above and red below, with a blue band between the two colours; it is accordion-pleated. Two identical skirts are often worn, one above the other. The unmarried girls wear white kerchiefs, the married women black.

== Churches ==
San Giovanni Battista.

- Sanctuary of the Vergine dei Martiri, Fonni
