= Tumbarinu =

Unpitched percussion instrument

Tumbarinu are Sardinian drums made with dog or donkey skin. They are a characteristic folk instrument of Gavoi.
