= Lake Gusana =

Lago di Gusana
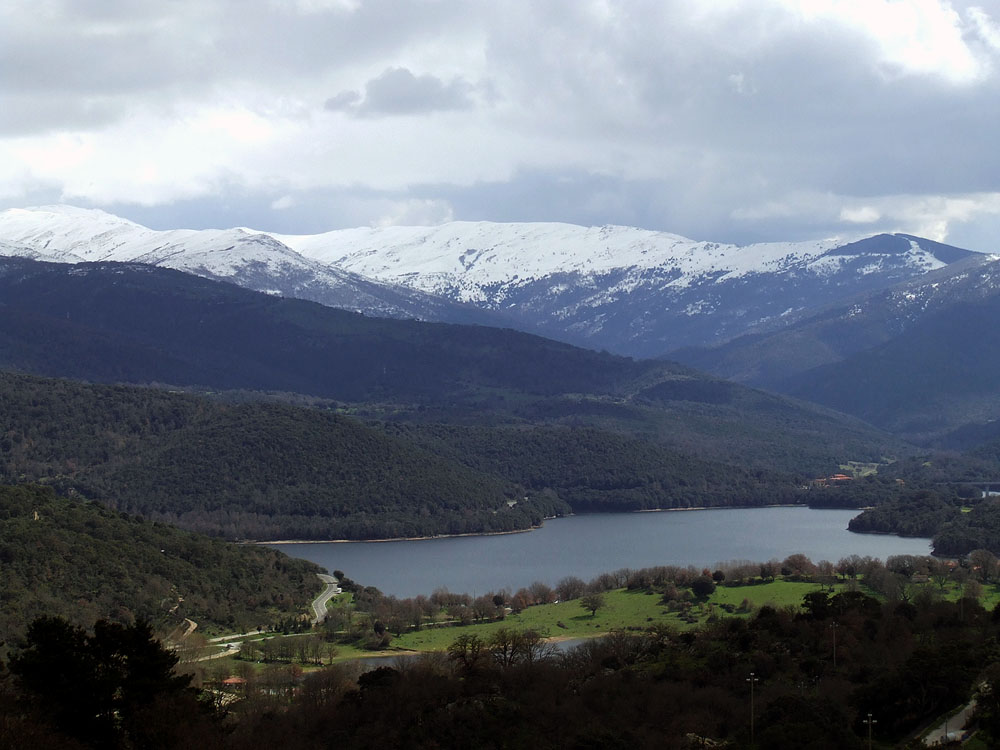

- Location within Sardinia
- Location: Gavoi, Sardinia
- Coordinates: 40.13177°N 9.20448°E
- Lake type: artificial lake
- Basin countries: Italy
- Surface area: 2 km^{2} (0.77 sq mi)
- Max. depth: 79.5 m (261 ft)

Lake Gusana (Italian: Lago di Gusana) is an artificial lake near the town of Gavoi in the interior of Sardinia, Italy.

The lake was built in the 1930s to store water for an electricity generator (central of Coghinadordza), and it covered an ancient Roman bridge as well as an ancient archaeological site of the Nuragici people.

It is now a tourist destination.
