= Belvì =

Belvì Brebì/Brevie (Sardinian)
- Comune
- Comune di Belvì
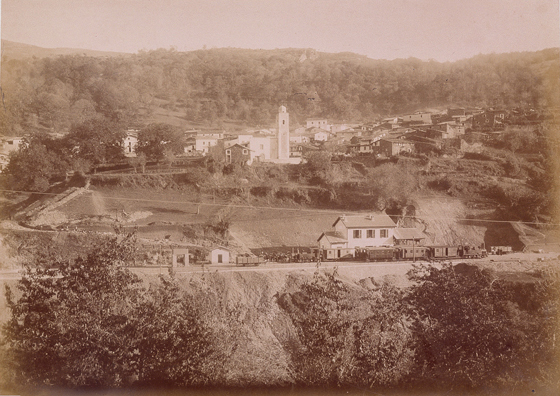
- Belvì in 1888

- Coat of arms

- Location within Sardinia
- Coordinates: 39°58′N 9°11′E
- Country: Italy
- Region: Sardinia
- Province: Nuoro (NU)

Government
  - Mayor: Maurizio Cadau

Area
  - Total: 18.10 km^{2} (6.99 sq mi)
- Elevation: 787 m (2,582 ft)

Population (2026)
  - Total: 529
  - Density: 29.2/km^{2} (75.7/sq mi)
- Demonym: Belviesi
- Time zone: UTC+1 (CET)
  - Summer (DST): UTC+2 (CEST)
- Postal code: 08030
- Dialing code: 0784

Belvì (Sardinian: Brebì or Brevie) is a village and comune (municipality) in the Province of Nuoro in the autonomous island region of Sardinia in Italy, located about 80 kilometres (50 mi) north of Cagliari and about 40 kilometres (25 mi) southwest of Nuoro. It has 529 inhabitants.

It is part of the traditional region Barbagia di Belvì, and borders the municipalities of Aritzo, Atzara, Desulo, Meana Sardo, Sorgono, and Tonara.

== Demographics ==
As of 2026, the population is 529, of which 52.7% are male, and 47.3% are female. Minors make up 10.2% of the population, and seniors make up 29.7%.

Historical population

Year	Pop.	±%
1861	791	—
1871	838	+5.9%
1881	742	−11.5%
1901	805	+8.5%
1911	857	+6.5%
1921	852	−0.6%
1931	873	+2.5%
1936	826	−5.4%

Year	Pop.	±%
1951	917	+11.0%
1961	932	+1.6%
1971	897	−3.8%
1981	832	−7.2%
1991	803	−3.5%
2001	741	−7.7%
2011	665	−10.3%
2021	560	−15.8%

Source: ISTAT

=== Immigration ===
As of 2025, immigrants make up 3.2% of the population. The 5 largest foreign countries of birth are Morocco, Switzerland, Chile, Senegal, and Germany.
