= Tiana, Sardinia =

Tiana Tìana (Sardinian)
- Comune
- Comune di Tiana
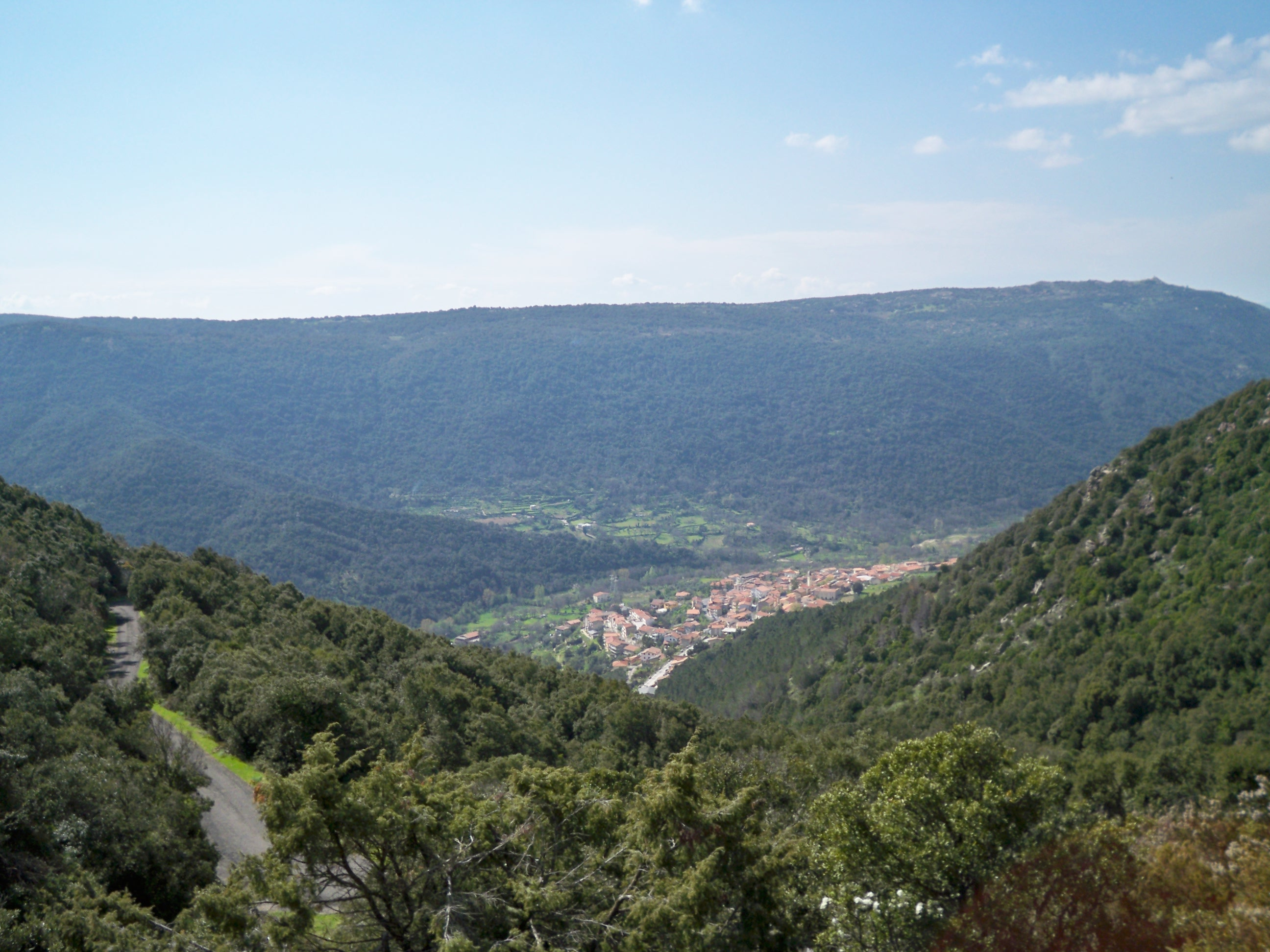
- View of Tiana

- Location within Sardinia
- Coordinates: 40°4′N 9°9′E
- Country: Italy
- Region: Sardinia
- Province: Nuoro (NU)

Area
  - Total: 19.32 km^{2} (7.46 sq mi)

Population (2026)
  - Total: 418
  - Density: 21.6/km^{2} (56.0/sq mi)
- Demonym: Tianesos (in Sardinian language) / Tianesi (in Italian)
- Time zone: UTC+1 (CET)
  - Summer (DST): UTC+2 (CEST)
- Postal code: 08020
- Dialing code: 0784

Tiana (Sardinian: Tìana) is a village and comune (municipality) in the Province of Nuoro in the autonomous island region of Sardinia in Italy, located in a valley on the slopes of Gennargentu mountain in the Ollolai Barbagia, about 150 kilometres (93 mi) north of Cagliari and about 50 kilometres (31 mi) southwest of Nuoro. It has 418 inhabitants.

Tiana borders the municipalities of Austis, Desulo, Ovodda, Sorgono, Teti, and Tonara.

== History ==
The Tiana area has been settled since Neolithic times, as evidenced by the presence of Domus de Janas in the Mancosu area, as well as some remains of Nuragic settlements in the Sa Piraera and Tudulo areas.

== Geography ==
The village is located about 600 metres (2,000 ft) above sea level. The peaks framing it exceed 1,000 metres (3,300 ft) in altitude and constitute the last outposts of the Gennargentu mountain range. The highest point in the territory is Bruncu Muncinale, at 1,267 metres (4,157 ft) above sea level.

The village is surrounded by woodland consisting of ilex and cork trees, as well as chestnut and walnut trees.

Tiana is included in the National Park of the Bay of Orosei and Gennargentu.

== Demographics ==
As of 2026, the population is 418, of which 50.2% are male, and 49.8% are female. Minors make up 9.1% of the population, and seniors make up 32.8%.

Historical population

Year	Pop.	±%
1861	544	—
1871	626	+15.1%
1881	615	−1.8%
1901	737	+19.8%
1911	814	+10.4%
1921	721	−11.4%
1931	721	+0.0%
1936	781	+8.3%

Year	Pop.	±%
1951	845	+8.2%
1961	938	+11.0%
1971	709	−24.4%
1981	695	−2.0%
1991	626	−9.9%
2001	584	−6.7%
2011	521	−10.8%
2021	444	−14.8%

Source: ISTAT

=== Immigration ===
As of 2025, immigrants make up 5.2% of the population. The 5 largest foreign countries of birth are France, Germany, Russia, Albania, and Poland.
