= Sorgono =

Sorgono Sòrgono (Sardinian)
- Comune
- Comune di Sorgono
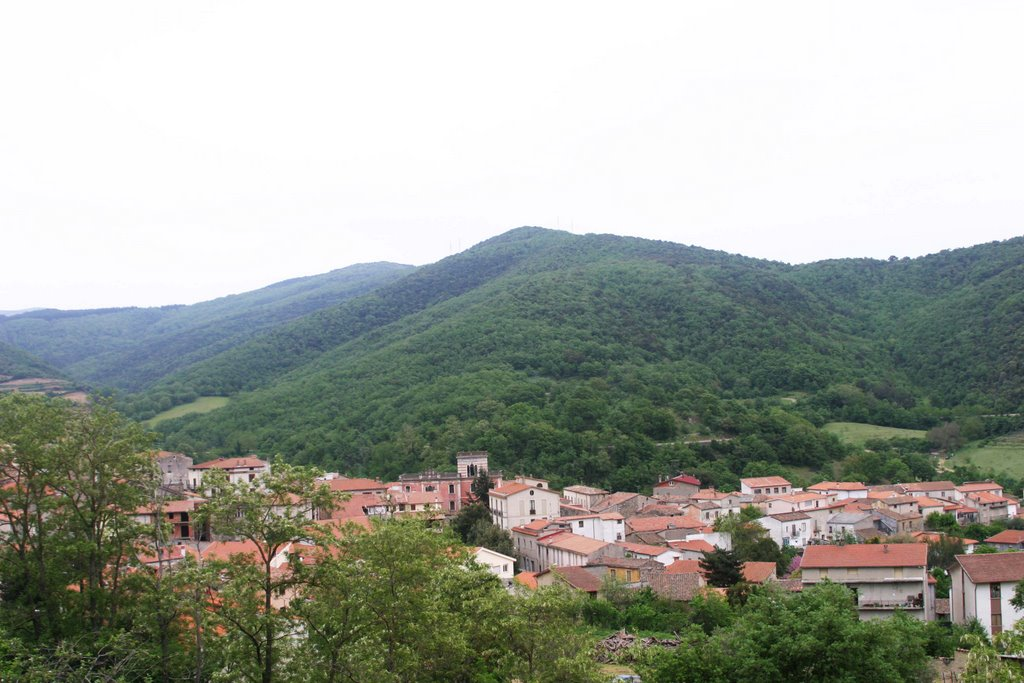
- View of Sorgono

- Location within Sardinia
- Coordinates: 40°2′N 9°6′E
- Country: Italy
- Region: Sardinia
- Province: Nuoro (NU)

Area
  - Total: 56.05 km^{2} (21.64 sq mi)
- Elevation: 700 m (2,300 ft)

Population (2026)
  - Total: 1,434
  - Density: 25.58/km^{2} (66.26/sq mi)
- Time zone: UTC+1 (CET)
  - Summer (DST): UTC+2 (CEST)
- Postal code: 08038
- Dialing code: 0784

Sorgono (Sardinian: Sòrgono) is a town and comune (municipality) in the Province of Nuoro in the autonomous island region of Sardinia in Italy, located about 90 kilometres (56 mi) north of Cagliari and about 35 kilometres (22 mi) southwest of Nuoro. It has 1,434 inhabitants.

The novelist D. H. Lawrence visited Sorgono in 1921 and described the town and its inhabitants in Chapter 5 of Sea and Sardinia.

Sorgono borders the municipalities of Atzara, Austis, Belvì, Neoneli, Ortueri, Samugheo, Tiana, and Tonara.

== Demographics ==
As of 2026, the population is 1,434, of which 50.4% are male, and 49.6% are female. Minors make up 10.4% of the population, and seniors make up 33.2%.

Historical population

Year	Pop.	±%
1861	1,594	—
1871	1,771	+11.1%
1881	1,588	−10.3%
1901	1,767	+11.3%
1911	1,968	+11.4%
1921	1,907	−3.1%
1931	1,942	+1.8%
1936	2,054	+5.8%

Year	Pop.	±%
1951	2,199	+7.1%
1961	2,346	+6.7%
1971	2,052	−12.5%
1981	2,123	+3.5%
1991	2,072	−2.4%
2001	1,949	−5.9%
2011	1,753	−10.1%
2021	1,529	−12.8%

Source: ISTAT

=== Immigration ===
As of 2025, immigrants make up 4.6% of the population. The 5 largest foreign countries of birth are Morocco, France, the Netherlands, Romania, and Germany.

== Notable people ==
- Giovanni Melis Fois (1916-2009), was born here
- Francesca Barracciu (born 1966), MEP, was born here
