= Sanctuary of the Vergine dei Martiri, Fonni =

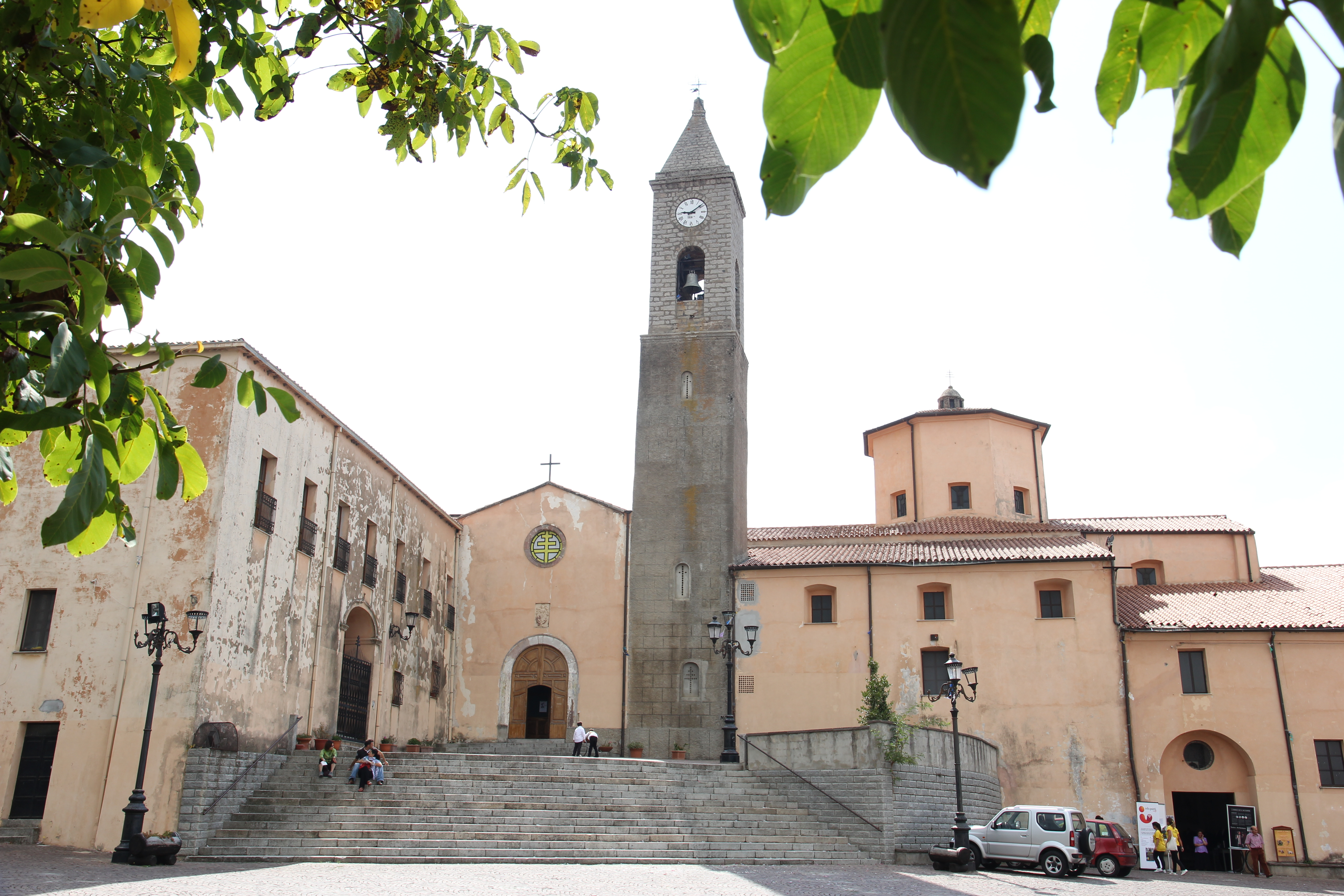

Religion
- Affiliation: Roman Catholic

Location
- Location: Fonni, province of Nuoro, Italy
- Interactive map of Sanctuary of the Vergine dei Martiri, Fonni
- Coordinates: 40°07′N 09°15′E

Architecture
- Groundbreaking: 1610
- Completed: 1706

Specifications
- Capacity: 1,000
- Length: 157 metres (515 ft)
- Width: 92 metres (302 ft)
- Width (nave): 16.75 metres (55 ft)
- Height (max): 45 metres (148 ft)
- Dome height (outer): 65.5 metres (215 ft)
- Spire height: 106.5 metres (349 ft)
- Materials: Brick with Candoglia marble

The Sanctuary of the Vergine dei Martiri ("Virgin of the Martyrs") is a religious edifice in Fonni, Sardinia, Italy.

On 14 April 1610, the Franciscan father of George Acillara took possession of the place where they would build the church and convent. The site, donated by fonnese Don Stefano Melis, was located in the district Logotza of the "villa" of Fonni belonging to the fief of Mandas. On the front of the church is still visible above the main door, the emblem of the noble family: an apple tree bearing fruit.

The convent and church, dedicated to the Blessed Trinity, was completed after several interruptions around 1632-33. The plan of the church was very simple: a large single barrel vault room, with three chapels on each side and the presbytery where is the picture of Antonio Todde depicting the Trinity. Attached was the classic facility of the Franciscan convent: a quadrilateral cell overlooking the cloister and the central well.

In 1702, after the demolition of the chapel of the Rosarya new edifice dedicated to the Virgin of the Martyrs was begun, which is annexed the one dedicated to the Trinity. The project was completed in October 1706.

The chapel-church is comprised by a space covered with a barrel vault on which overlook two semicircular chapels. The raised presbytery structure concludes with the altar that houses Our Lady of Martyrs. At the chapel, on a high drum was structured a windowed octagonal cupola. The lavish sculptural decoration of the basilica is adorned by paintings by Pietro Antonio and Gregorio Are (father and son).

The underground sanctuary dedicated to St. Gregory the Great is divided into two rooms that were originally separated by an iron gate: the vestibule and the sanctuary. In the first, a rectangular room with barrel vault, five niches per side house busts of saints connected with the Franciscan tradition. In the second room, also rectangular and barrel vaulted, various altars and images in polychrome stucco. The ceiling has tempera paintings.

The Oratory of San Michele Arcangelo was built between 1758-1759 on models imported from Lombardy. The dome of the building is decorated with tempera also by Gregorio Are. Inside the monastery there is a valuable collection of paintings from the 17th and 18th.

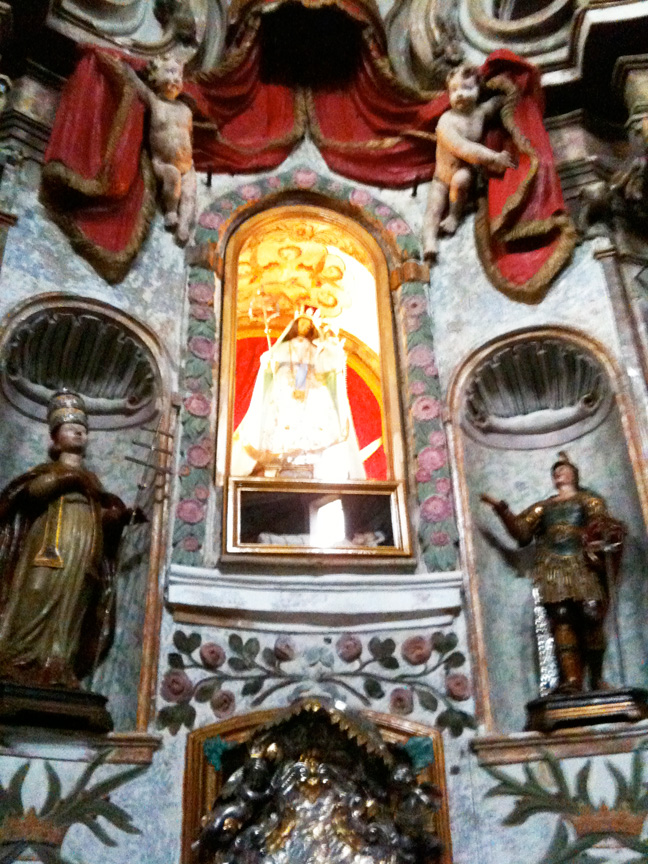
Basilica Della Madonna dei Martiri Altar

Basilica Della Madonna dei Martiri Angels

Basilica Della Madonna dei Martiri

The Oratory of San Michele Arcangelo
