= Busachi =

Busachi Busache
- Comune
- Comune di Busachi
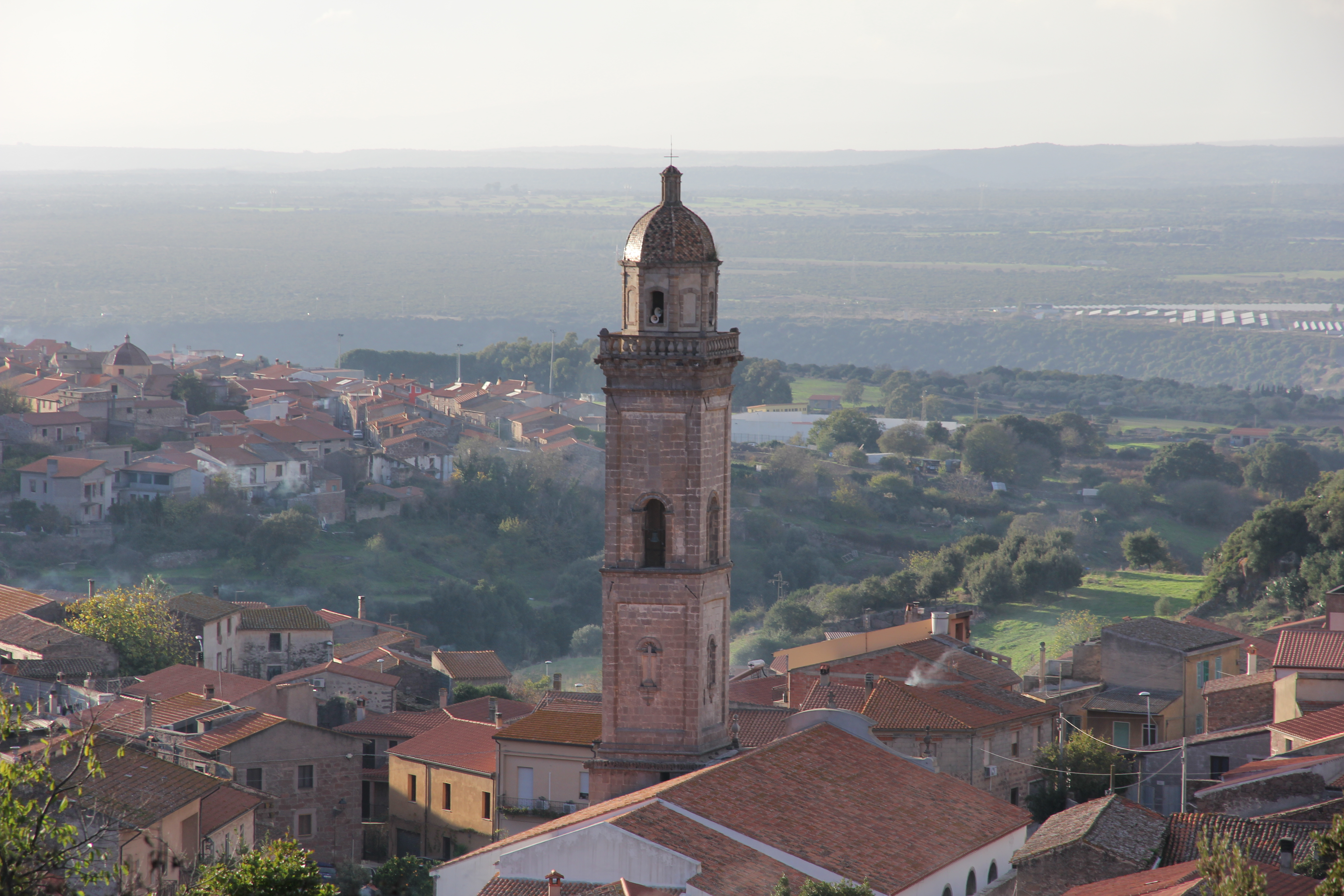

- Location within Sardinia
- Coordinates: 40°01′56″N 8°53′46″E
- Country: Italy
- Region: Sardinia
- Province: Oristano (OR)

Government
  - Mayor: Giovanni Orrù

Area
  - Total: 59.03 km^{2} (22.79 sq mi)
- Elevation: 379 m (1,243 ft)

Population (30 April 2017)
  - Total: 1,282
  - Density: 21.72/km^{2} (56.25/sq mi)
- Demonym(s): Busachesi; Busachesos
- Time zone: UTC+1 (CET)
  - Summer (DST): UTC+2 (CEST)
- Postal code: 09082
- Dialing code: 0783
- Website: Official website

Busachi (official name in Sardinian language: Busache) is a comune (municipality) in the Province of Oristano in the Italian region Sardinia, located about 90 kilometres (56 mi) north of Cagliari and about 30 kilometres (19 mi) northeast of Oristano.

Busachi borders the following municipalities: Allai, Fordongianus, Ghilarza, Neoneli, Samugheo, Ula Tirso.
