= Ovodda =

- Comune
- Comune di Ovodda
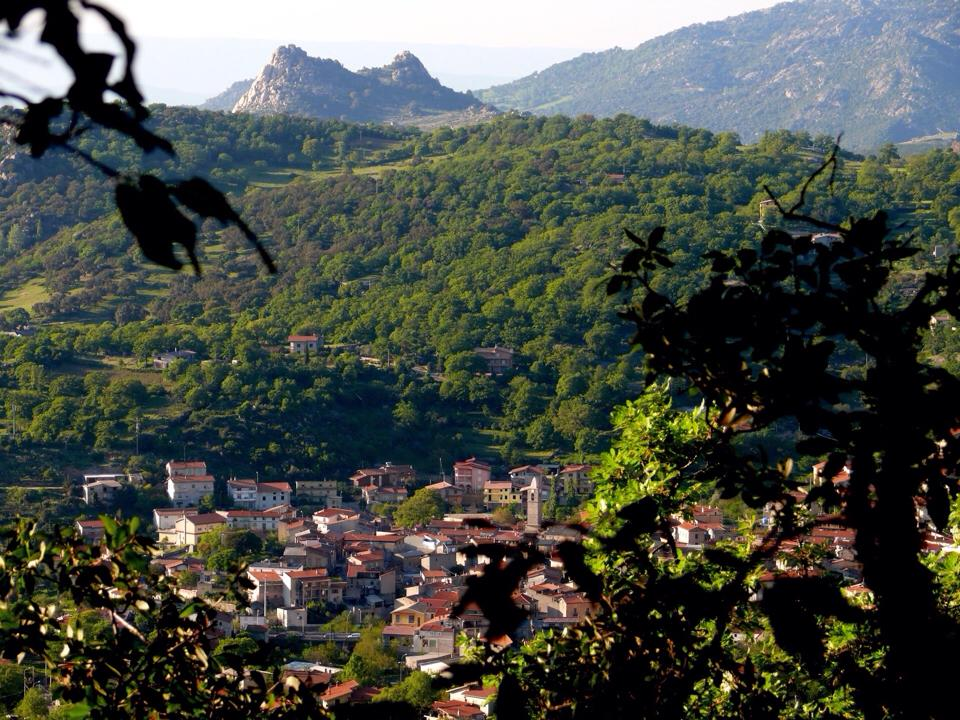
- View of Ovodda

- Location within Sardinia
- Coordinates: 40°6′N 9°10′E
- Country: Italy
- Region: Sardinia
- Province: Nuoro (NU)

Government
  - Mayor: Maria Cristina Sedda

Area
  - Total: 40.85 km^{2} (15.77 sq mi)
- Elevation: 751 m (2,464 ft)

Population (2026)
  - Total: 1,429
  - Density: 34.98/km^{2} (90.60/sq mi)
- Demonym: Ovoddesi
- Time zone: UTC+1 (CET)
  - Summer (DST): UTC+2 (CEST)
- Postal code: 08020
- Dialing code: 0784
- Website: Official website

Ovodda is a town and comune (municipality) in the Province of Nuoro in the autonomous island region of Sardinia in Italy, located about 100 kilometres (62 mi) north of Cagliari and about 30 kilometres (19 mi) southwest of Nuoro. It has 1,429 inhabitants.

Ovodda borders the municipalities of Desulo, Fonni, Gavoi, Ollolai, Teti, and Tiana.

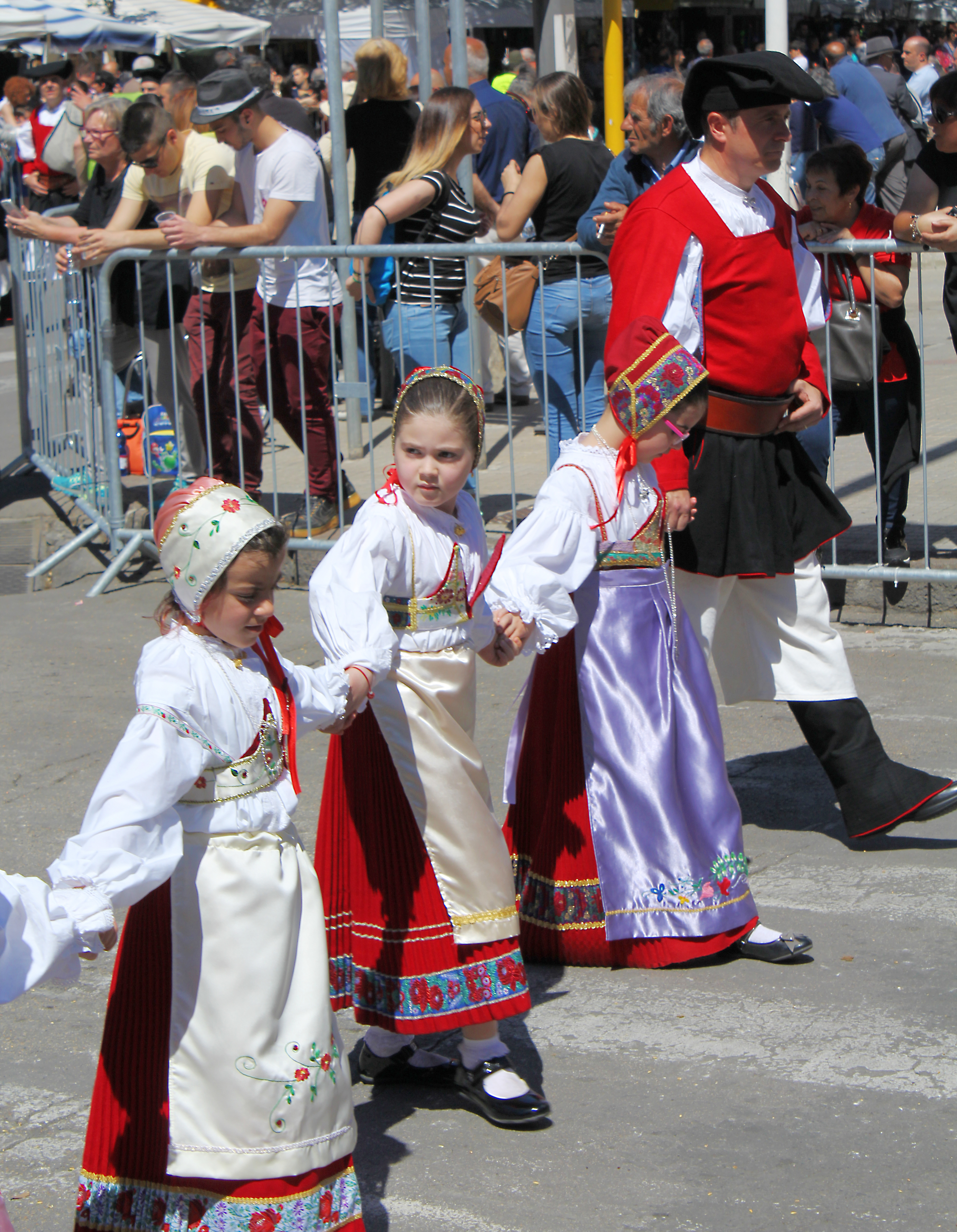
Traditional costumes from Ovodda

== Demographics ==
As of 2026, the population is 1,429, of which 50.4% are male, and 49.6% are female. Minors make up 14.2% of the population, and seniors make up 29.0%.

Historical population

Year	Pop.	±%
1861	1,094	—
1871	1,119	+2.3%
1881	1,157	+3.4%
1901	1,323	+14.3%
1911	1,298	−1.9%
1921	1,360	+4.8%
1931	1,473	+8.3%
1936	1,580	+7.3%

Year	Pop.	±%
1951	1,789	+13.2%
1961	2,110	+17.9%
1971	1,882	−10.8%
1981	1,797	−4.5%
1991	1,783	−0.8%
2001	1,732	−2.9%
2011	1,627	−6.1%
2021	1,536	−5.6%

Source: ISTAT

=== Immigration ===
As of 2025, immigrants make up 2.3% of the population. The 5 largest foreign countries of birth are Albania, Romania, France, Germany, and Brazil.
