= Gavoi =

- Comune
- Comune di Gavoi
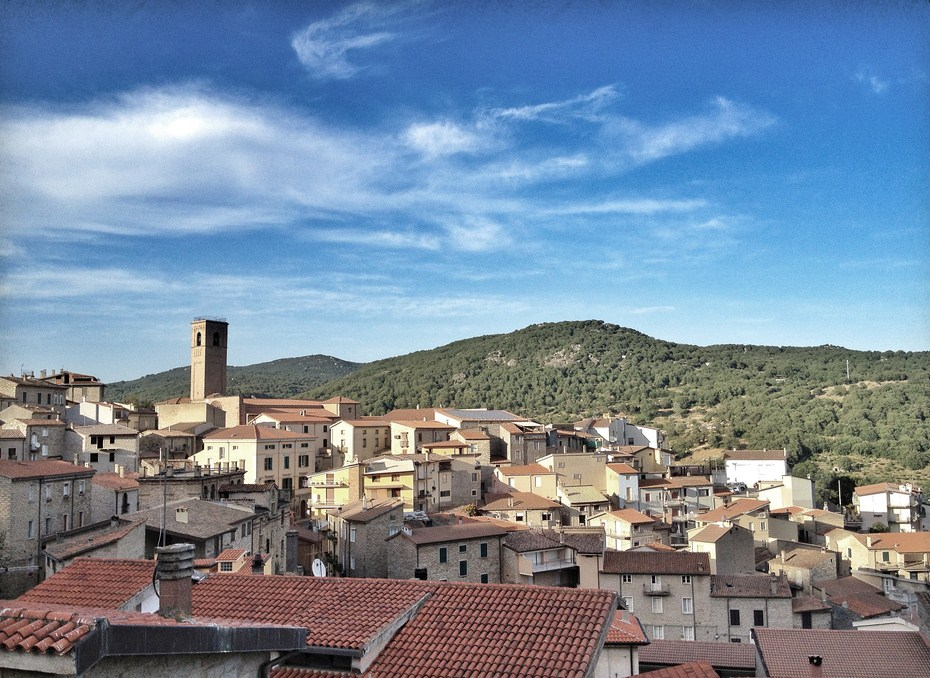
- View of Gavoi

- Location within Sardinia
- Coordinates: 40°10′N 09°12′E
- Country: Italy
- Region: Sardinia
- Province: Nuoro (NU)

Government
  - Mayor: Giovanni Cugusi

Area
  - Total: 38.06 km^{2} (14.70 sq mi)
- Elevation: 777 m (2,549 ft)

Population (2026)
  - Total: 2,404
  - Density: 63.16/km^{2} (163.6/sq mi)
- Demonym: Gavoesi
- Time zone: UTC+1 (CET)
  - Summer (DST): UTC+2 (CEST)
- Postal code: 08020
- Dialing code: 0784

Gavoi is a town and comune in the province of Nuoro in the autonomous island region of Sardinia in Italy, located in the natural region of Barbagia about 100 kilometres (62 mi) north of Cagliari and about 20 kilometres (12 mi) southwest of Nuoro. It has 2,404 inhabitants.

The municipality of Gavoi contains Lake Gusana, and borders the municipalities of Fonni, Lodine, Mamoiada, Ollolai, and Ovodda.

== History ==
The territory of Gavoi is inhabited since the prenuragic period. During the Middle Ages, it is cited various times in the list of villages and towns that paid the taxes to the Roman curia.

Gavoi was hit by the plague in the 18th century.

== Demographics ==
As of 2026, the population is 2,404, of which 49.1% are male, and 50.9% are female. Minors make up 12.3% of the population, and seniors make up 30.6%.

Historical population

Year	Pop.	±%
1861	1,735	—
1871	1,965	+13.3%
1881	2,016	+2.6%
1901	2,455	+21.8%
1911	2,782	+13.3%
1921	2,529	−9.1%
1931	2,785	+10.1%
1936	2,840	+2.0%

Year	Pop.	±%
1951	3,304	+16.3%
1961	3,751	+13.5%
1971	3,472	−7.4%
1981	3,284	−5.4%
1991	3,021	−8.0%
2001	3,011	−0.3%
2011	2,790	−7.3%
2021	2,497	−10.5%

Source: ISTAT

=== Immigration ===
As of 2025, immigrants make up 3.0% of the population. The 5 largest foreign countries of birth are Argentina, Morocco, Romania, Albania, and Ukraine.

== Main sights ==
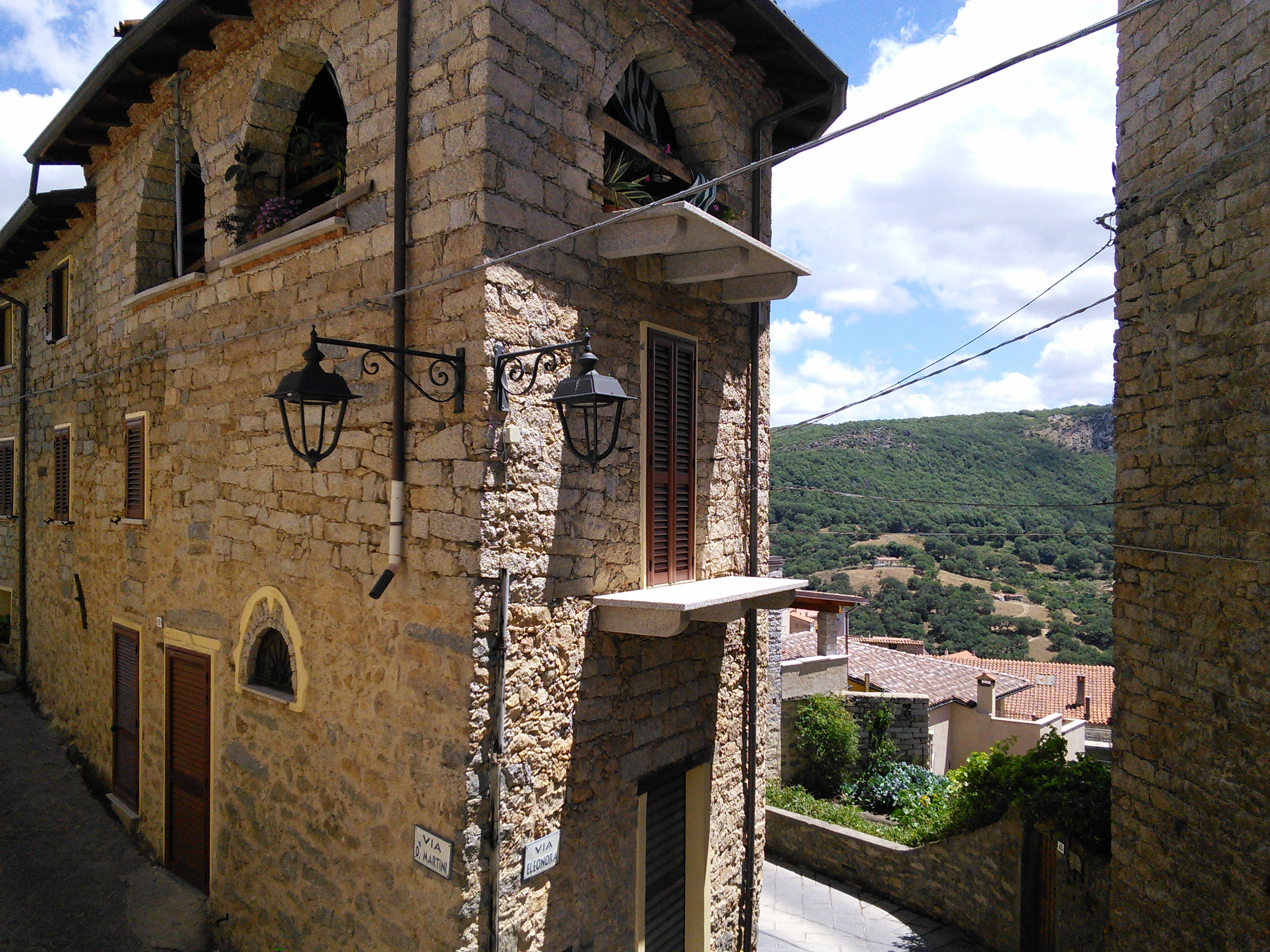
A glimpse of the town with the typical granitic stone houses

The Roman church of San Gavino is Gavoi's foremost sacred spot, through there are eight other ancient churches in the village. The village's center contains rock houses with balconies, and a village fountain is known as "Antana 'e Cartzonna".

Near the lake are the archaeological areas of Orrui and San Michele di Fonni. A Roman bridge is submerged beneath the lake.

== Culture and traditions ==
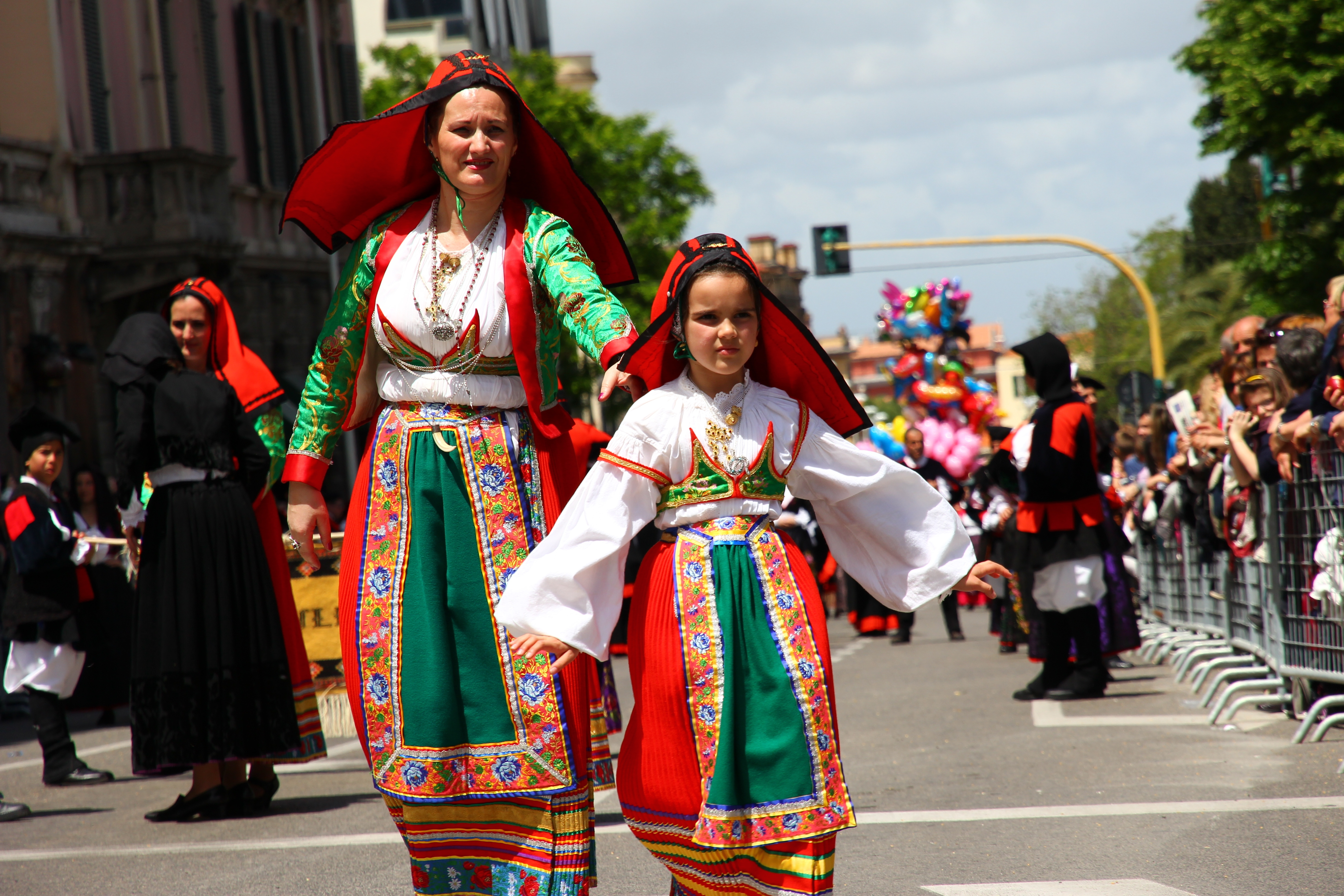
Traditional costumes

The "tumbarinu" is a traditional drum made of lamb skin, and more rarely, dog or donkey skin. The tumbarinu is often accompanied with the pipiolu, the traditional sheppard's fife. The "ballu tundu", is a traditional dance in the round, as in the Balkan area. Poetry is esteemed, including extemporaneous rhyme competitions on given topics.

The nearby Sanctuary of Madonna d'Itria hosts a palio, in this case a peculiar horse competition very similar to that of Siena.

== Economy ==
Mountain tourism is among the sources of income. Agriculture production include potatoes and cheese (the town is famous for its Fiore Sardo).
