= Neoneli =

Neoneli Neunele
- Comune
- Comune di Neoneli
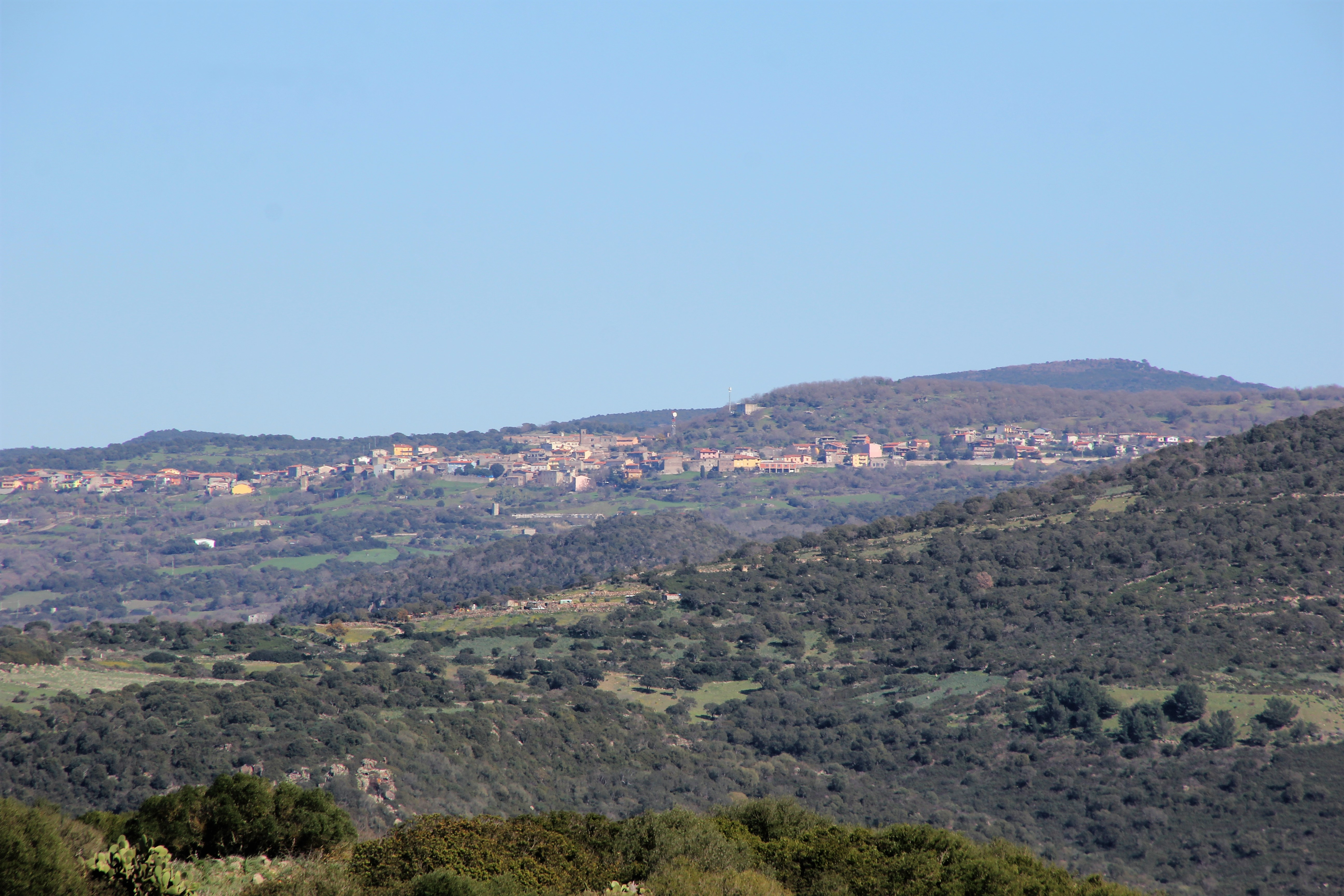

- Coat of arms

- Location within Sardinia
- Coordinates: 40°4′N 8°57′E
- Country: Italy
- Region: Sardinia
- Province: Oristano (OR)

Government
  - Mayor: Salvatore Cau

Area
  - Total: 47.9 km^{2} (18.5 sq mi)
- Elevation: 554 m (1,818 ft)

Population (31 December 2010)
  - Total: 717
  - Density: 15.0/km^{2} (38.8/sq mi)
- Demonym: Neonelesi
- Time zone: UTC+1 (CET)
  - Summer (DST): UTC+2 (CEST)
- Postal code: 09080
- Dialing code: 0783

Neoneli (Sardinian: Neunele) is a comune (municipality) in the Province of Oristano in the Italian region Sardinia, located about 100 kilometres (62 mi) north of Cagliari and about 35 kilometres (22 mi) northeast of Oristano.

Neoneli borders the following municipalities: Ardauli, Austis, Nughedu Santa Vittoria, Ortueri, Sorgono, and Ula Tirso.
