= Austis =

Austis Aùstis (Sardinian)
- Comune
- Comune di Austis
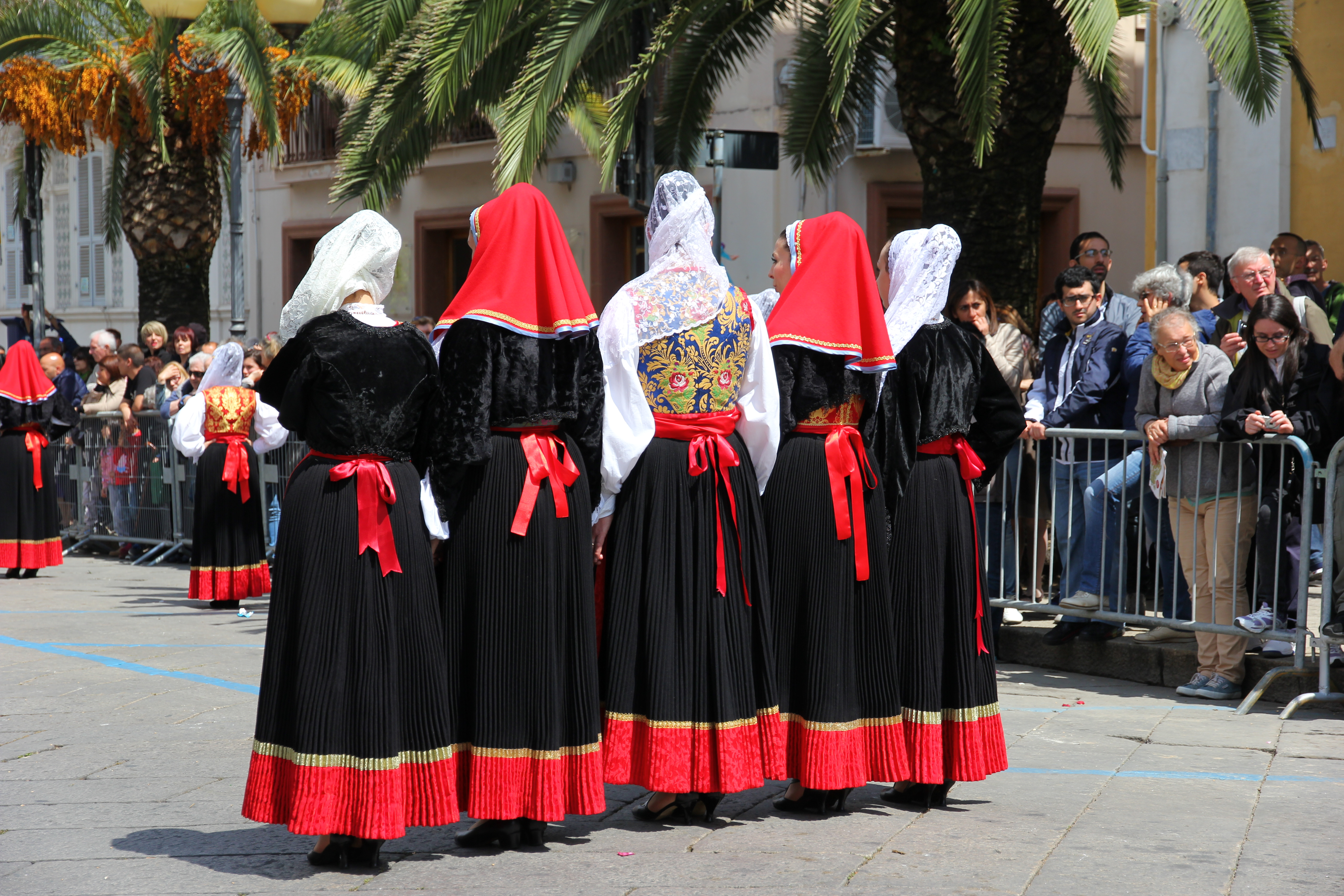
- Traditional clothing of Austis

- Location within Sardinia
- Coordinates: 40°4′N 9°5′E
- Country: Italy
- Region: Sardinia
- Province: Nuoro

Government
  - Mayor: Maria Domenica Porcu

Area
  - Total: 50.81 km^{2} (19.62 sq mi)
- Elevation: 737 m (2,418 ft)

Population (2026)
  - Total: 711
  - Density: 14.0/km^{2} (36.2/sq mi)
- Demonym: Austesi
- Time zone: UTC+1 (CET)
  - Summer (DST): UTC+2 (CEST)
- Postal code: 08030
- Dialing code: 0784
- Website: Official website

Austis (Sardinian: Aùstis) is a village and comune (municipality) in the Province of Nuoro in the autonomous island region of Sardinia in Italy, located about 90 kilometres (56 mi) north of Cagliari and about 35 kilometres (22 mi) southwest of Nuoro. It has 711 inhabitants.

Austis borders the municipalities of Neoneli, Nughedu Santa Vittoria, Olzai, Ortueri, Sorgono, Teti, and Tiana.

== Demographics ==
As of 2026, the population is 711, of which 50.2% are male, and 49.8% are female. Minors make up 10.4% of the population, and seniors make up 32.1%.

Historical population

Year	Pop.	±%
1861	688	—
1871	728	+5.8%
1881	735	+1.0%
1901	744	+1.2%
1911	890	+19.6%
1921	967	+8.7%
1931	1,002	+3.6%
1936	1,079	+7.7%

Year	Pop.	±%
1951	1,228	+13.8%
1961	1,482	+20.7%
1971	1,268	−14.4%
1981	1,081	−14.7%
1991	1,054	−2.5%
2001	959	−9.0%
2011	876	−8.7%
2021	772	−11.9%

Source: ISTAT

=== Immigration ===
As of 2025, immigrants make up 3.3% of the population. The 5 largest foreign countries of birth are Romania, Belgium, Germany, Poland, and Albania.
