= Sarrabus-Gerrei =

Sub-region of south-eastern Sardinia, Italy

Coordinates: 39.4200°N 9.5700°E

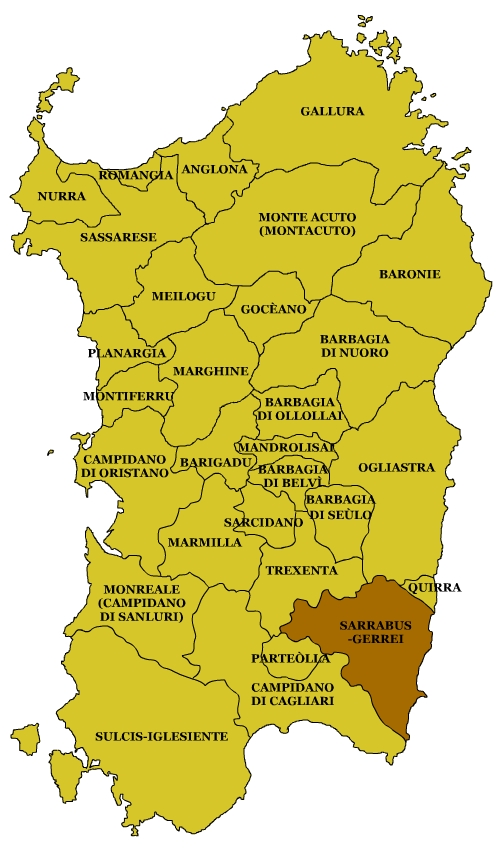
Sarrabus-Gerrei in Sardinia

Sarrabus-Gerrei is a sub-region of south-eastern Sardinia, Italy.

== Sarrabus ==
Traditionally Sarrabus, probably from the Roman-time city of Sarcopos, occupies the area of the communes of Castiadas, Muravera, San Vito and Villaputzu, corresponding to the curatory with the same name of the medieval giudicato of Cagliari. Geologically, it dates to the Palaeozoic era and it is crossed by the Flumendosa, initially in a valley and then to a coastal plain on the Tyrrhenian Sea.

Specimens of the mineral ullmannite (NiSbS) were found at Sarrabus in 1887. The crystals of the specimens from Sarrabus were described as hemihedral with parallel faces, whereas specimens from Lölling in present-day Austria were hemihedral with inclined faces.

== Gerrei ==
Gerrei is composed of the territories of Armungia, Ballao, Escalaplano, Goni, San Nicolò Gerrei, Silius, Villasalto, San Basilio. It also corresponds to a medieval curatory (province) of the Giudicato of Cagliari. It is characterized by a series of plateaus divided by steep valleys, crossed by the Flumendosa.

Sights include a Megalithic necropolis near Goni, belonging to the culture of Ozieri and including several Domus de Janas, and a Holy Pit of Funtana Coberta, at Ballao.

== See also ==
- Province of South Sardinia
