= Ballao =

Ballao Ballau
- Comune
- Comune di Ballao
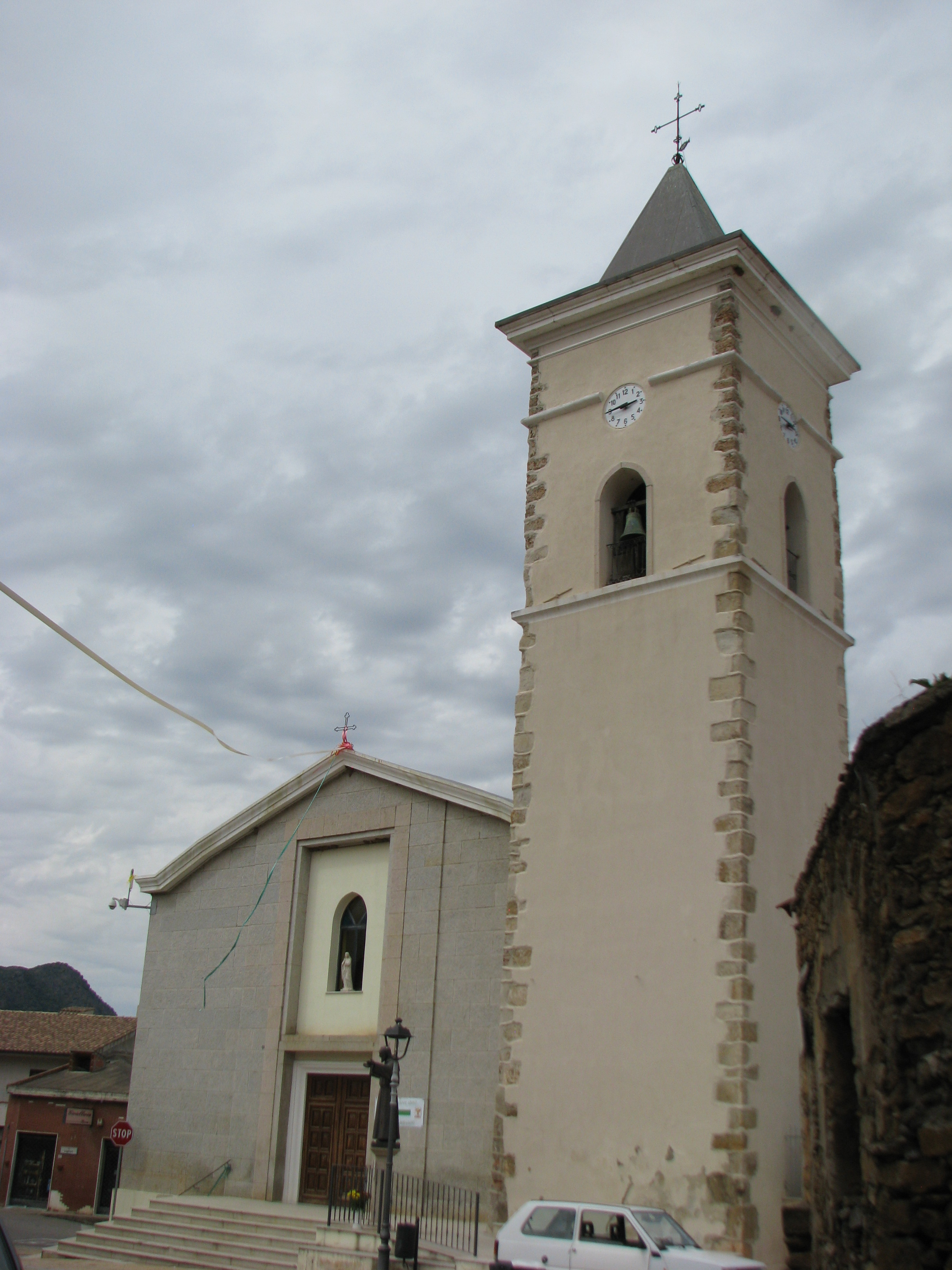
- Church of Maria Maddalena

- Coat of arms

- Location within Sardinia
- Coordinates: 39°33′N 9°22′E
- Country: Italy
- Region: Sardinia
- Metropolitan city: Cagliari

Government
  - Mayor: Severino Cubeddu

Area
  - Total: 46.63 km^{2} (18.00 sq mi)
- Elevation: 98 m (322 ft)

Population (2026)
  - Total: 706
  - Density: 15.1/km^{2} (39.2/sq mi)
- Demonym: Ballaesi
- Time zone: UTC+1 (CET)
  - Summer (DST): UTC+2 (CEST)
- Postal code: 09040
- Dialing code: 070

Ballao (Sardinian: Ballau) is a village and comune (municipality) in the Metropolitan City of Cagliari in the autonomous island region of Sardinia in Italy, located about 45 kilometres (28 mi) northeast of Cagliari, in the Gerrei traditional subregion. It has 706 inhabitants.

Ballao borders the municipalities of Armungia, Escalaplano, Goni, Perdasdefogu, San Nicolò Gerrei, Silius, and Villaputzu.

== History ==
It was founded around 1300, when the inhabitants of the ancient hill village of Nuraxi moved in the nearby plain, nearer to the Flumendosa river, to improve their agricultural output. It is home to the Funtana Coberta, a Bronze Age archaeological site.

== Demographics ==
As of 2026, the population is 706, of which 50.8% are male, and 49.2% are female. Minors make up 10.6% of the population, and seniors make up 34.6%.

Historical population

Year	Pop.	±%
1861	937	—
1871	942	+0.5%
1881	1,006	+6.8%
1901	1,181	+17.4%
1911	1,477	+25.1%
1921	1,295	−12.3%
1931	1,229	−5.1%
1936	1,327	+8.0%

Year	Pop.	±%
1951	1,580	+19.1%
1961	1,679	+6.3%
1971	1,359	−19.1%
1981	1,220	−10.2%
1991	1,086	−11.0%
2001	971	−10.6%
2011	877	−9.7%
2021	731	−16.6%

Source: ISTAT

=== Immigration ===
As of 2025, of the known countries of birth of 712 residents, the most numerous are: Italy (678 – 95.2%), Germany (26 – 3.7%).
