= Orroli =

Orroli Arrolli
- Comune
- Comune di Orroli
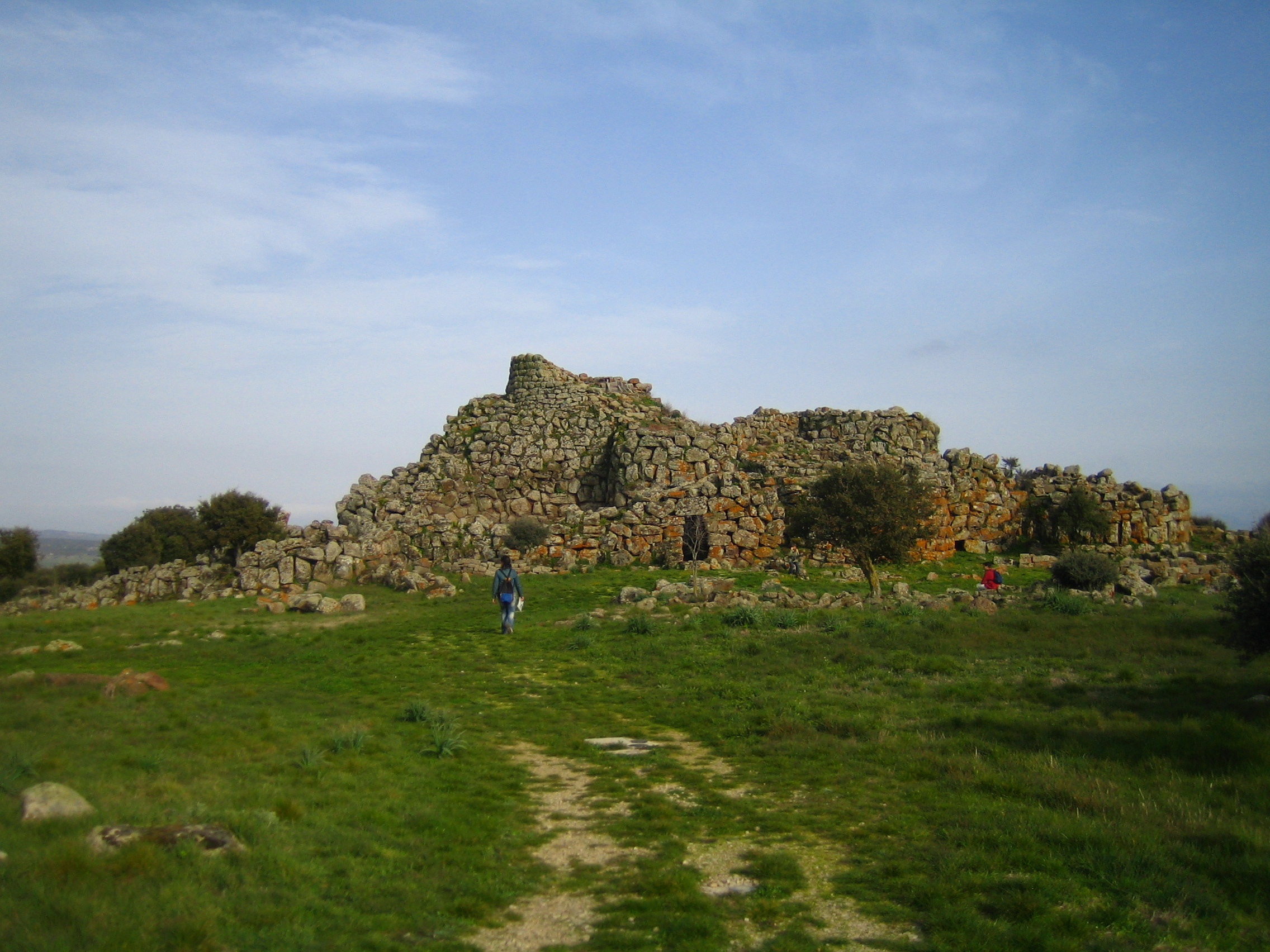
- Nuraghe Arrubiu

- Location within Sardinia
- Coordinates: 39°42′N 9°15′E
- Country: Italy
- Region: Sardinia
- Metropolitan city: Cagliari (CA)

Area
  - Total: 75.6 km^{2} (29.2 sq mi)
- Elevation: 550 m (1,800 ft)

Population (Dec. 2004)
  - Total: 2,647
  - Density: 35.0/km^{2} (90.7/sq mi)
- Demonym: Orrolesi
- Time zone: UTC+1 (CET)
  - Summer (DST): UTC+2 (CEST)
- Postal code: 08030
- Dialing code: 0782
- Website: Official website

Orroli, meaning "downy oak" (Sardinian: Arrólli) is, a comune (municipality) in the Metropolitan City of Cagliari in the Italian region of Sardinia, located about 67.4 kilometres (41.9 mi) north of Cagliari. As of 31 December 2010, it had a population of 2,430 and an area of 75.6 square kilometres (29.2 mi^{2}). Orroli territory hosts one of the most important nuraghi of Sardinia called Nuraghe Arrubiu, the only intact example of a five-tower nuraghe, one of the dam in the Flumendosa river and the dam of the Mulargia, which gave name to the artificial lake. Within the village there are many hostels and bed and breakfasts organized around old lifestyles and ancient traditions.

Orroli borders the following municipalities: Escalaplano, Esterzili, Goni, Nurri, Siurgus Donigala.

== Demographic evolution ==
Historical population

Year	Pop.	±%
1861	1,782	—
1871	1,939	+8.8%
1881	2,146	+10.7%
1901	2,185	+1.8%
1911	2,365	+8.2%

Year	Pop.	±%
1921	2,250	−4.9%
1931	2,425	+7.8%
1936	2,620	+8.0%
1951	3,243	+23.8%
1961	3,606	+11.2%

Year	Pop.	±%
1971	3,125	−13.3%
1981	3,334	+6.7%
1991	3,084	−7.5%
2001	2,752	−10.8%

Source: Data from ISTAT
