= Nurri =

- Comune
- Comune di Nurri
- Location within Sardinia
- Coordinates: 39°43′N 9°14′E
- Country: Italy
- Region: Sardinia
- Metropolitan city: Cagliari (CA)

Area
  - Total: 73.9 km^{2} (28.5 sq mi)

Population (Dec. 2004)
  - Total: 2,385
  - Density: 32.3/km^{2} (83.6/sq mi)
- Time zone: UTC+1 (CET)
  - Summer (DST): UTC+2 (CEST)
- Postal code: 08035
- Dialing code: 0782

Nurri is a comune (municipality) in the Metropolitan City of Cagliari in the Italian region Sardinia, located about 60 km (37 mi) north of Cagliari. As of 31 December 2004, it had a population of 2,385 and an area of 73.9 km^{2} (28.5 sq mi).

Nurri borders the following municipalities: Esterzili, Isili, Mandas, Orroli, Sadali, Serri, Siurgus Donigala, Villanova Tulo.

== Demographic evolution ==
Historical population

Year	Pop.	±%
1861	2,282	—
1871	2,256	−1.1%
1881	2,446	+8.4%
1901	2,619	+7.1%
1911	2,764	+5.5%

Year	Pop.	±%
1921	2,869	+3.8%
1931	3,071	+7.0%
1936	3,324	+8.2%
1951	3,988	+20.0%
1961	3,946	−1.1%

Year	Pop.	±%
1971	3,347	−15.2%
1981	3,034	−9.4%
1991	2,715	−10.5%
2001	2,431	−10.5%

Source: Data from ISTAT
