= Metropolitan City of Cagliari =

Metropolitan City of Cagliari Città metropolitana di Cagliari (Italian) Tzittadi metropolitana de Casteddu (Campidanese)
- Metropolitan City
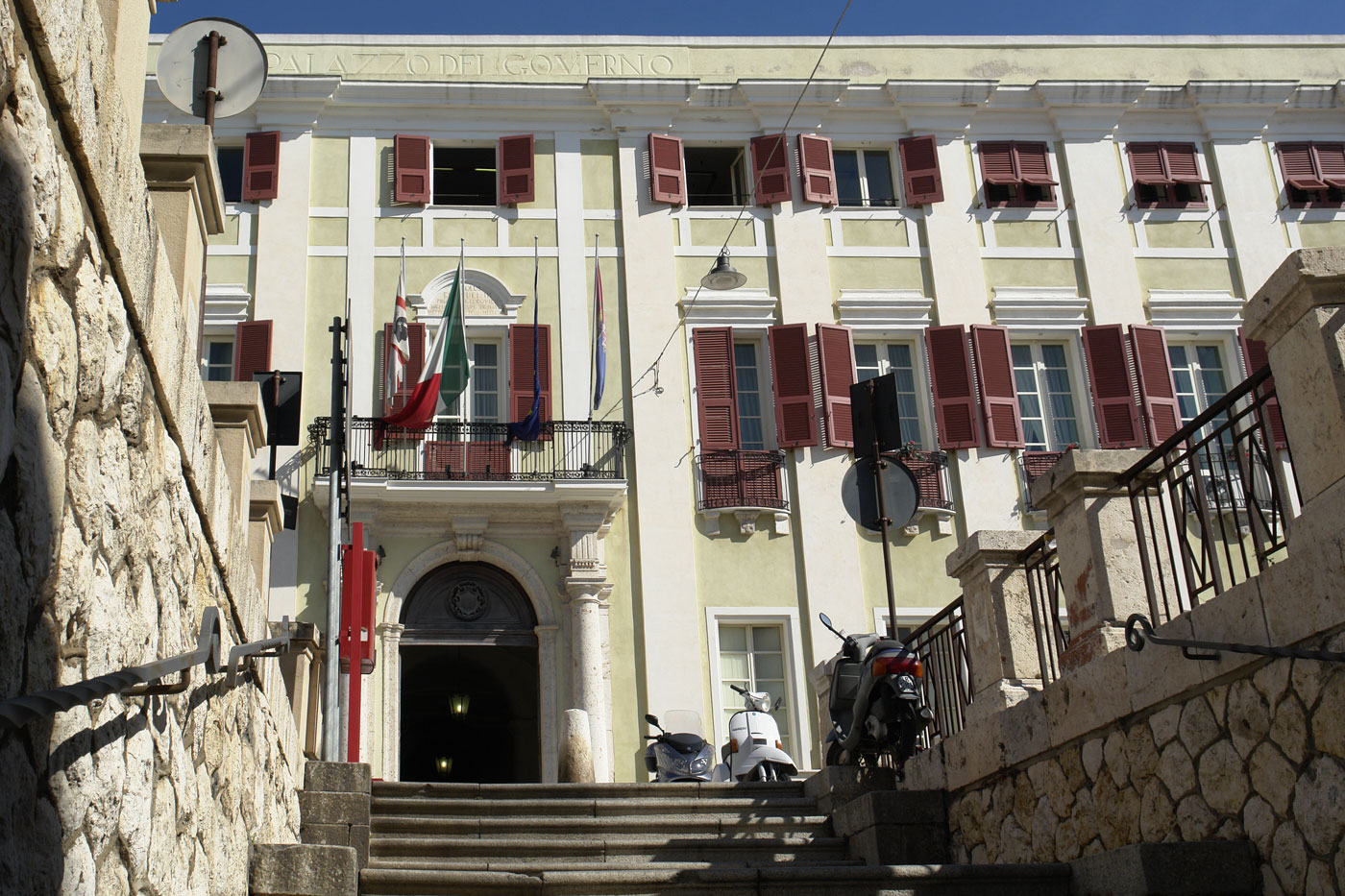
- The Royal Palace of Cagliari, the Metropolitan City seat

- Flag Coat of arms

- Location of the Metropolitan City of Cagliari
- Country: Italy
- Region: Sardinia
- Established: 4 February 2016
- Expanded: 1 June 2025
- Capital(s): Cagliari
- Municipalities: 70

Government
  - Metropolitan mayor: Massimo Zedda

Area
  - Total: 4,309.21 km^{2} (1,663.80 sq mi)

Population (2026)
  - Total: 534,219
  - Density: 123.971/km^{2} (321.085/sq mi)

GDP
  - Metro: €13.593 billion (2015)
  - Per capita: €24,204 (2015)
- Time zone: UTC+1 (CET)
  - Summer (DST): UTC+2 (CEST)
- Postal code: 09121-09134 (Cagliari); 09012, 09018, 09028, 09032-09033, 09042, 09044-09045, 09047-09048, 09050, 09060, 09067-09069 (other municipalities)
- Telephone prefix: 070
- Vehicle registration: CA
- ISTAT: 292
- Website: https://cittametropolitanacagliari.it/

The Metropolitan City of Cagliari (Italian: città metropolitana di Cagliari; Campidanese: tzittadi metropolitana de Casteddu) is a metropolitan city in the autonomous region of Sardinia in Italy. Its capital is the city of Cagliari and includes 70 other municipalities (comuni). It was established by law in 2016 and replaced the province of Cagliari, and was expanded by 53 municipalities on 1 June 2025 with the disestablishment of the Province of South Sardinia. The current president is the mayor of Cagliari, Massimo Zedda. The population is 534,219, as of 2026, while the population of the functional urban area is approximately 477,000.

== Geography ==
Map of the metropolitan city of Cagliari, the capital in red

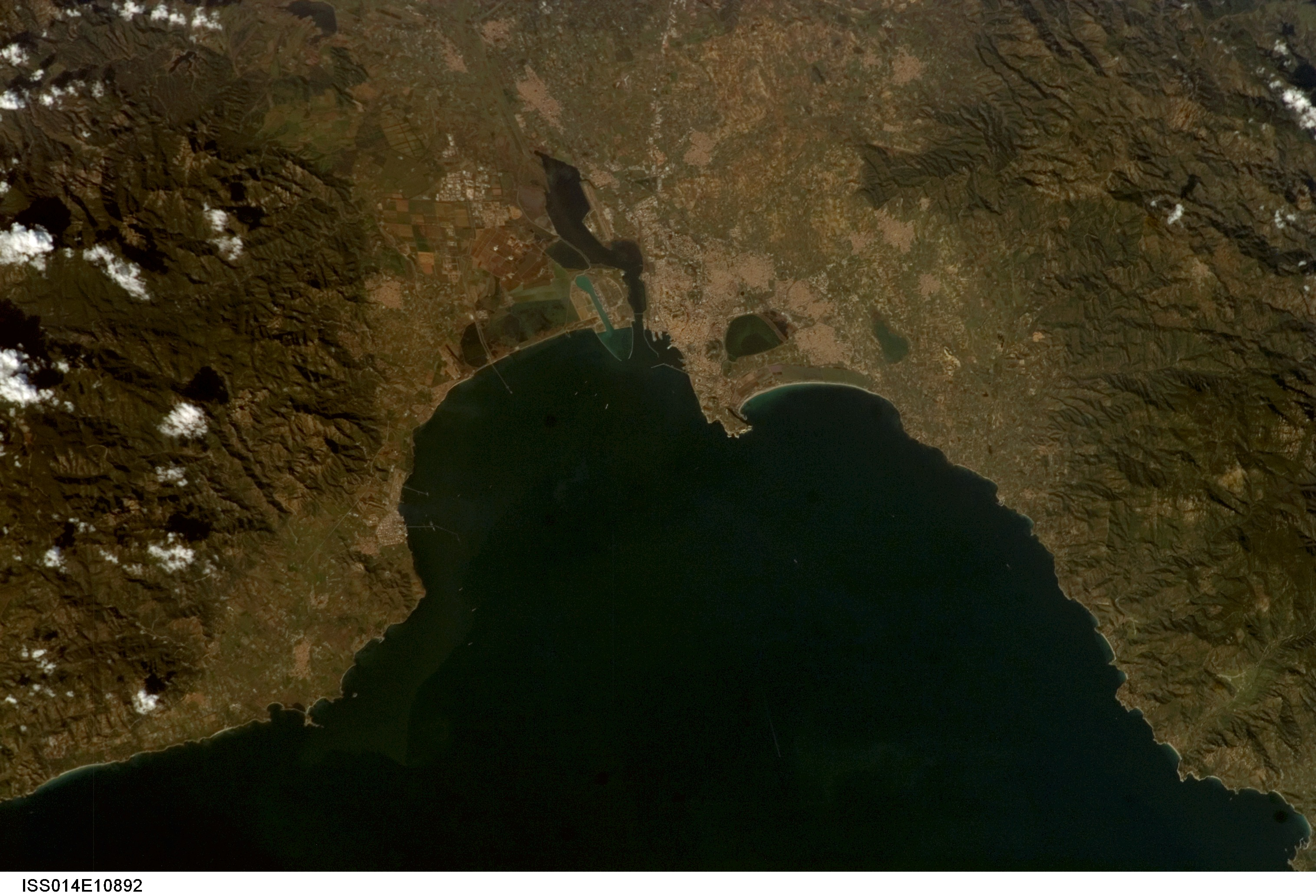
Satellite view of the Metropolitan city of Cagliari

The Metropolitan City of Cagliari extends over the southern part of the Campidano plain, between two mountain ranges. The Sulcis Range is to the west and includes Monti Arcosu, Monte Serpeddi, and Punta Sebera. To the east is the Monte Linias Range, including Punta Serpeddì and Sette Fratelli. These mountains are composed of Ordovician shale and Carboniferous granite and do not exceed 1,000 m (3,300 ft). An exception is Monte Is Caravius which is 1,116 m (3,661 ft).

=== Climate ===
The Metropolitan City of Cagliari has a Mediterranean climate with hot, dry Summers and mild Winters. It is unusual for Summer temperatures to rise above 40 °C (104 °F), often with high humidity, while in winter, the record lows are below zero. Heavy snowfalls occur rarely; on average, every thirty years. January is the coldest month with an average temperature of about 10 °C (50 °F). August is the warmest month with an average temperature of that of about 25 °C (77 °F). African anticyclone activity can cause heat waves starting in June. From mid-June to mid-September rain is rare and appears in afternoon storms. The rainy season starts in September, but the first cold days come in December, usually the wettest month. Winds are frequent, especially the mistral and sirocco; in Summer days a marine sirocco breeze (s'imbattu) lowers the temperature and the humidity.

On the surrounding mountains, the climate is very different with plentiful average rainfall, cold winters, and mild warm summers (Csb in the Köppen climate classification).

Climate data for Cagliari
Month	Jan	Feb	Mar	Apr	May	Jun	Jul	Aug	Sep	Oct	Nov	Dec	Year
Mean daily maximum °C (°F)	14.3 (57.7)	14.8 (58.6)	16.5 (61.7)	18.6 (65.5)	22.9 (73.2)	27.3 (81.1)	30.4 (86.7)	30.8 (87.4)	27.4 (81.3)	23.1 (73.6)	18.3 (64.9)	15.4 (59.7)	21.7 (71.1)
Daily mean °C (°F)	9.9 (49.8)	10.3 (50.5)	11.8 (53.2)	13.7 (56.7)	17.7 (63.9)	21.7 (71.1)	24.7 (76.5)	25.2 (77.4)	22.3 (72.1)	18.4 (65.1)	13.8 (56.8)	11.0 (51.8)	16.7 (62.1)
Mean daily minimum °C (°F)	5.5 (41.9)	5.8 (42.4)	7.1 (44.8)	8.9 (48.0)	12.4 (54.3)	16.2 (61.2)	18.9 (66.0)	19.6 (67.3)	17.1 (62.8)	13.7 (56.7)	9.3 (48.7)	6.6 (43.9)	11.8 (53.2)
Average rainfall mm (inches)	49.7 (1.96)	53.3 (2.10)	40.4 (1.59)	39.7 (1.56)	26.1 (1.03)	11.9 (0.47)	4.1 (0.16)	7.5 (0.30)	34.9 (1.37)	52.6 (2.07)	58.4 (2.30)	48.9 (1.93)	427.5 (16.83)
Average rainy days (≥ 1.0 mm)	6.8	6.8	6.8	7.0	4.4	2.1	0.8	1.3	4.3	6.5	7.4	7.4	61.6
Mean monthly sunshine hours	136.4	139.2	186.0	213.0	269.7	288.0	334.8	310.0	246.0	198.4	147.0	127.1	2,595.6
Source: Servizio Meteorologico,

Climate data for Is Cannoneris near Punta Sebera m. 716 on sea level
Month	Jan	Feb	Mar	Apr	May	Jun	Jul	Aug	Sep	Oct	Nov	Dec	Year
Mean daily maximum °C (°F)	9.2 (48.6)	10.2 (50.4)	12 (54)	13.7 (56.7)	18.3 (64.9)	22.6 (72.7)	26.4 (79.5)	27.9 (82.2)	23.4 (74.1)	18.2 (64.8)	13.8 (56.8)	10.9 (51.6)	17.2 (63.0)
Daily mean °C (°F)	6.7 (44.1)	7.3 (45.1)	8.8 (47.8)	10.4 (50.7)	14.4 (57.9)	19.0 (66.2)	22.0 (71.6)	23.7 (74.7)	19.6 (67.3)	15.4 (59.7)	11.2 (52.2)	7.9 (46.2)	13.9 (57.0)
Mean daily minimum °C (°F)	3.1 (37.6)	5.2 (41.4)	5.8 (42.4)	7.8 (46.0)	11.5 (52.7)	15.5 (59.9)	19.7 (67.5)	19.4 (66.9)	16.2 (61.2)	12.7 (54.9)	9.1 (48.4)	5.6 (42.1)	11.0 (51.8)
Average rainfall mm (inches)	156 (6.1)	155 (6.1)	128 (5.0)	95 (3.7)	64 (2.5)	17 (0.7)	4 (0.2)	15 (0.6)	49 (1.9)	128 (5.0)	141 (5.6)	178 (7.0)	1,130 (44.5)
Source: Servizio Meteorologico

== Government ==
=== List of metropolitan mayors ===
	Metropolitan Mayor	Term start	Term end	Party
1	Massimo Zedda	1 January 2017	31 March 2019	Independent (left-wing)
2	Paolo Truzzu	18 July 2019	19 April 2024	Brothers of Italy
(1)	Massimo Zedda	17 June 2024	Incumbent	Independent (left-wing)

=== Municipalities ===
- Armungia
- Assemini
- Ballao
- Barrali
- Burcei
- Cagliari
- Capoterra
- Castiadas
- Decimomannu
- Decimoputzu
- Dolianova
- Domus de Maria
- Donori
- Elmas
- Escalaplano
- Escolca
- Esterzili
- Genoni
- Gergei
- Gesico
- Goni
- Guamaggiore
- Guasila
- Isili
- Mandas
- Maracalagonis
- Monastir
- Monserrato
- Muravera
- Nuragus
- Nurallao
- Nuraminis
- Nurri
- Orroli
- Ortacesus
- Pimentel
- Pula
- Quartu Sant'Elena
- Quartucciu
- Sadali
- Samatzai
- San Basilio
- San Nicolò Gerrei
- San Sperate
- San Vito
- Sant'Andrea Frius
- Sarroch
- Selargius
- Selegas
- Senorbì
- Serdiana
- Serri
- Sestu
- Settimo San Pietro
- Siliqua
- Silius
- Sinnai
- Siurgus Donigala
- Soleminis
- Suelli
- Ussana
- Uta
- Vallermosa
- Villa San Pietro
- Villanova Tulo
- Villaputzu
- Villasalto
- Villasimius
- Villasor
- Villaspeciosa

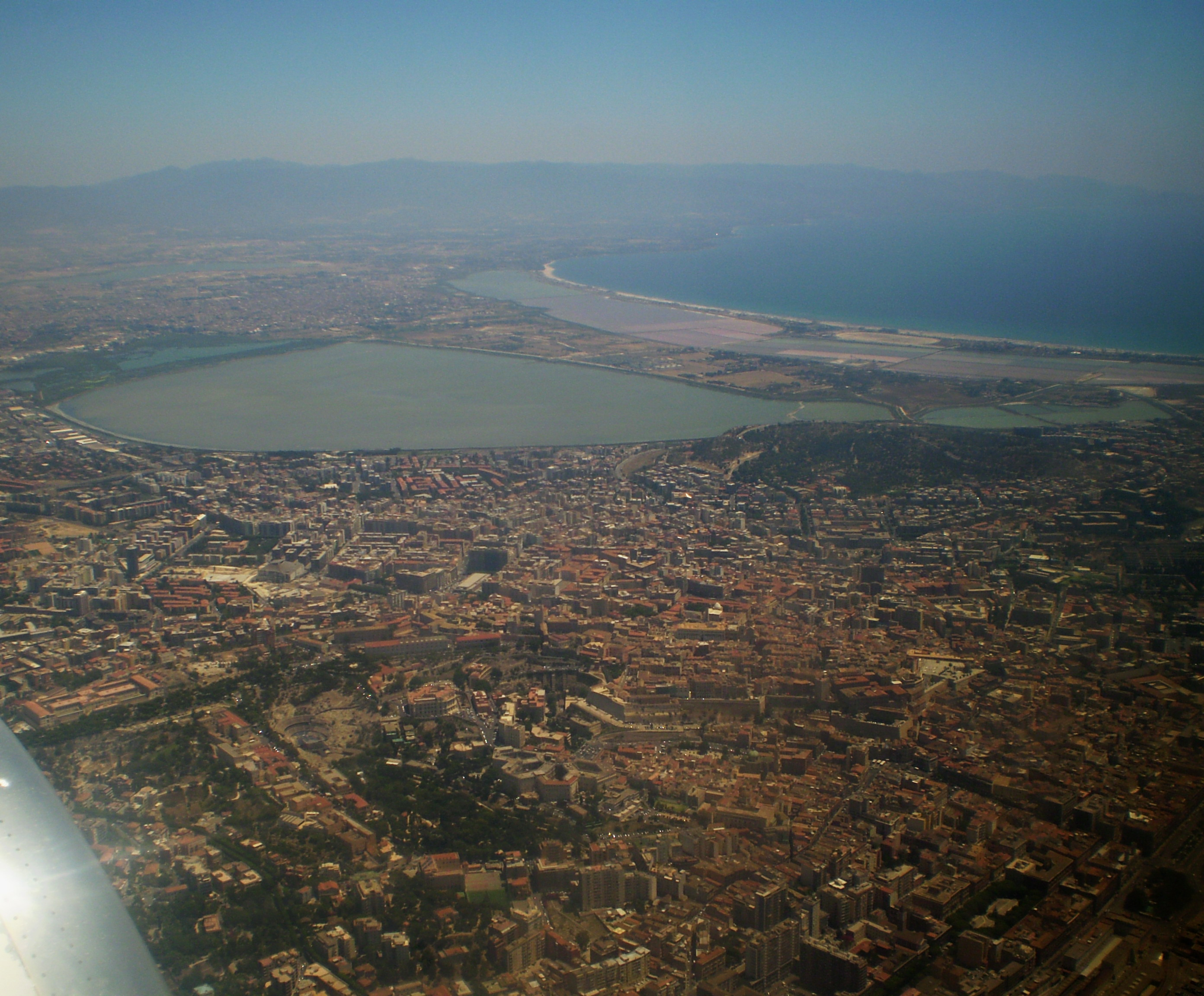
Aerial view of Cagliari

On 12 April 2021, per the Sardinian Regional Council's Regional Law Nr. 7, the metropolitan city was set to expand, following the suppression of the province of South Sardinia, as it would absorb its municipalities that do not become part of the reconstituted provinces of Medio Campidano and Sulcis Iglesiente (formerly Carbonia-Iglesias). Whilst the Italian government challenged the law, thus stalling its implementation, on March 12, 2022, the Constitutional Court ruled in favor of the Autonomous Region of Sardinia. On April 13, 2023, the regional council, at the proposal of the regional government, approved an amendment to the 2021 reform, defining the timeframe and manner of its implementation, which had its full implementation on 1 June 2025.

== Demographics ==
As of 2026, the population is 534,219, of which 48.8% are male, and 51.2% are female. Minors make up 12.0% of the population, and seniors make up 27.0%.

In 1861, the current metropolitan city had 137,808 inhabitants, while the city proper had 37,243. Since then, the city had a population growth of 293%, while the metropolitan city as a whole had an increase of 289%. In that year Cagliari had a population that was 27.0% of the metropolitan city, only slightly increasing to 27.4% in 2025.

Historical population

Year	Pop.	±%
1861	137,808	—
1871	132,961	−3.5%
1881	142,610	+7.3%
1901	170,867	+19.8%
1911	192,155	+12.5%
1921	199,823	+4.0%
1931	231,470	+15.8%
1936	247,491	+6.9%

Year	Pop.	±%
1951	319,267	+29.0%
1961	393,242	+23.2%
1971	448,385	+14.0%
1981	503,456	+12.3%
1991	531,088	+5.5%
2001	539,305	+1.5%
2011	546,795	+1.4%
2021	541,847	−0.9%

Source: ISTAT

=== Immigration ===
As of 2025, the foreign-born population is 27,045, making up 5.0% of the total population.

== Economy ==
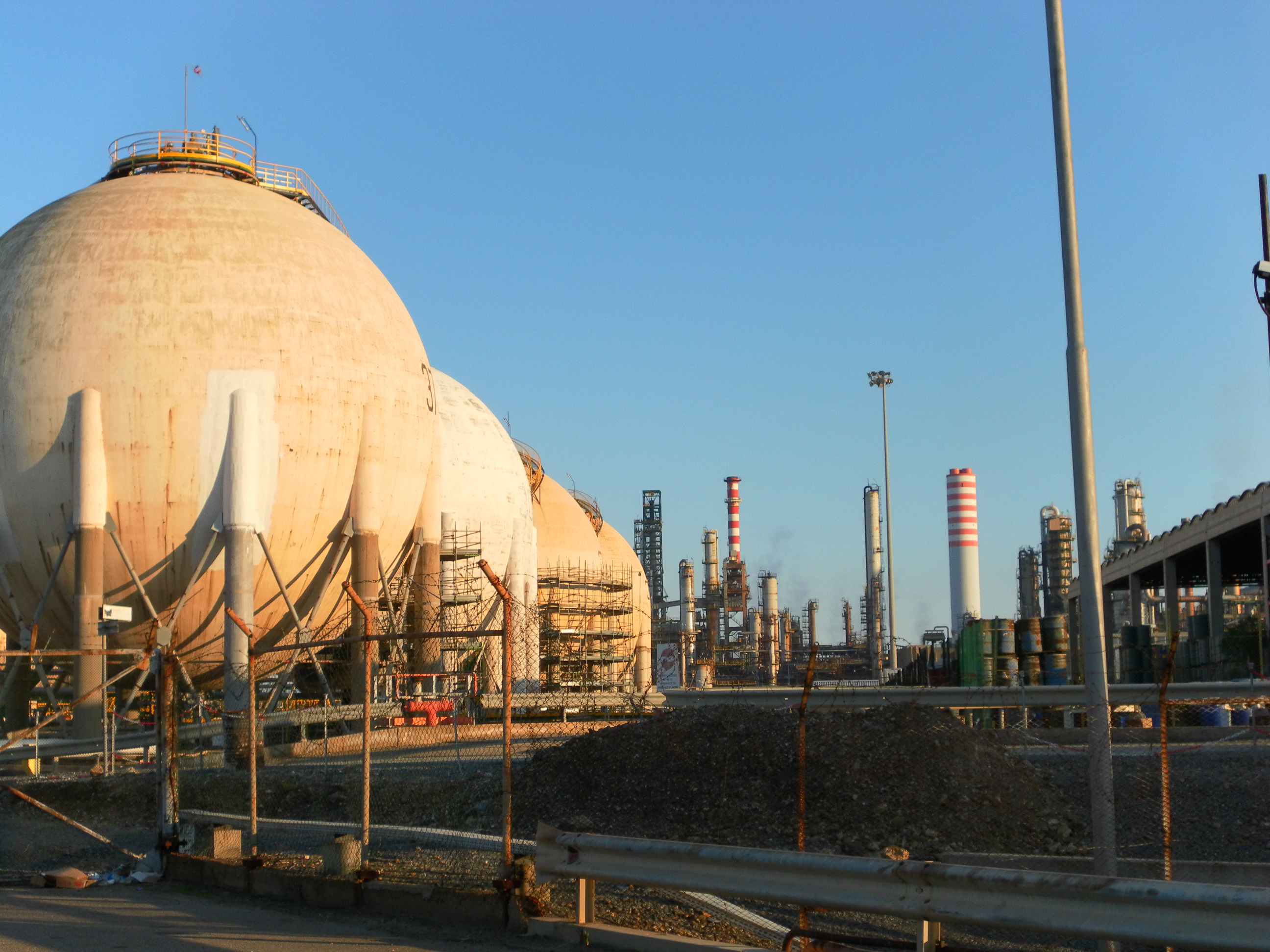
Saras oil Refinery.

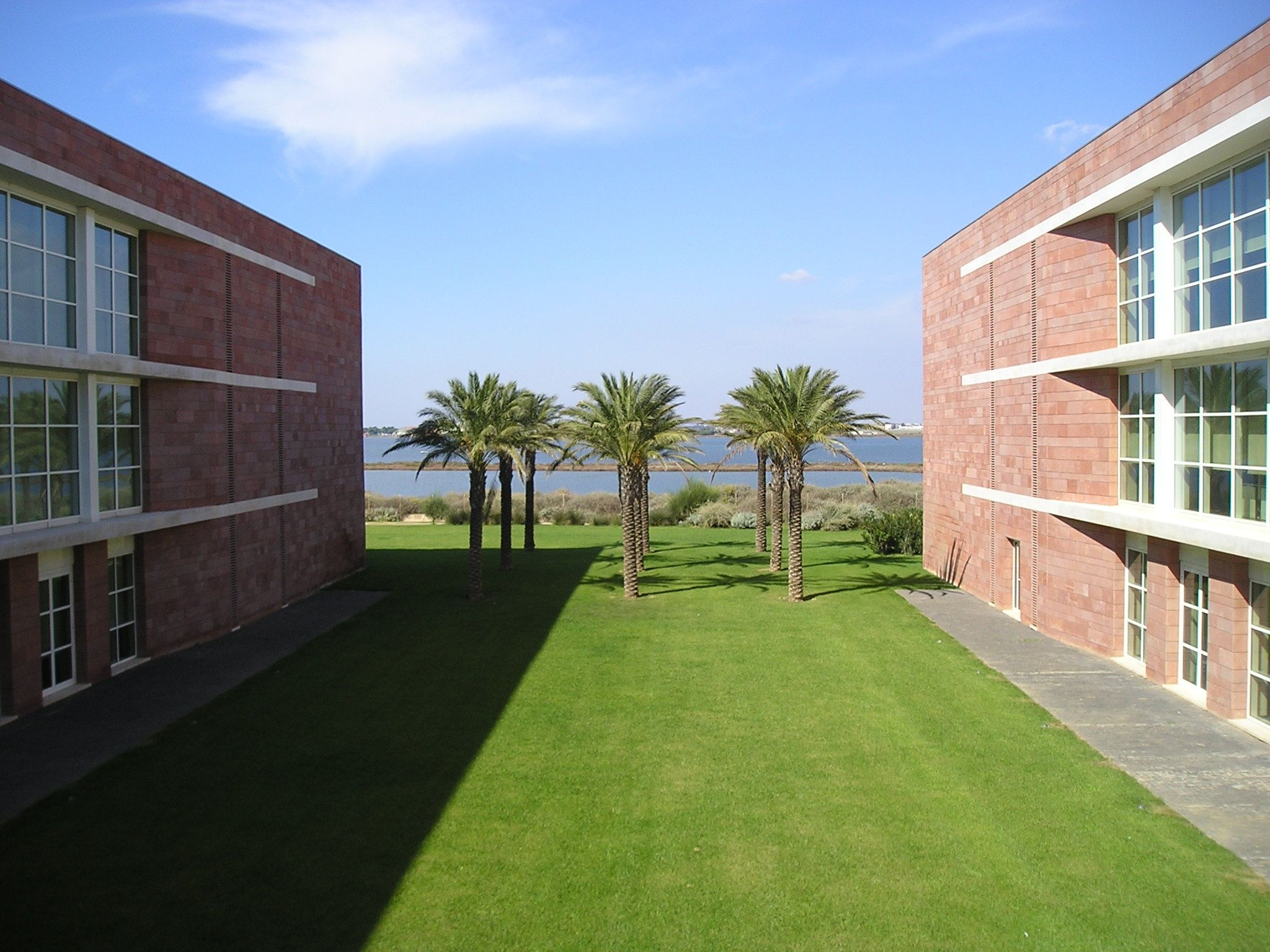
Tiscali Campus.

According to 2014 data from the Ministry of Economy and Finance, the per capita income of the residents of Cagliari was 122% of the national average; for the metropolitan area it was 103% and for Sardinia as a whole it was 86%. The 26% of the island population that lives in Cagliari Metropolitan City produces 31% of the island's GDP and the urban-area income is greater than that of the rest of Sardinia. According to Eurostat in 2009 the metropolitan area of Cagliari had a per capita purchasing power standard (PPS) of 21.699 euros, which is 92.4% of the European Union (27) data.

The Metropolitan City has an unemployment rate of 17.7%. This is higher than the national rate of 12.2% and higher than the regional unemployment rate of 17.5%.

The traditional economy was based on agriculture: the cultivation of wheat, olive groves and vineyards, gardens and orchards wherever there was plenty of water in the dry Summers. The mountains were exploited for firewood and coal that were sold in Cagliari. There were mines, particularly the Iron mine of San Leone in the territory of Assemini. The large salt pans east and west of Cagliari were also exploited.

Currently the capital city holds most of the administrative offices, the retail trade (particularly in the historic center), financial services, professional offices, and health services. Industry, warehousing, and major shopping centers are concentrated in the other municipalities of the metropolitan area. Tourism is concentrated along the coast.

In 2014, the Cagliari-Sarroch port system was the third largest in Italy, as measured by amount of goods transferred.

The Macchiareddu-Grogastru area between Cagliari and Capoterra, in conjunction with the Port of Cagliari, is the most important industrial area of Sardinia. The port includes the Cagliari International Container Terminal (CICT) at Giorgino, which had an annual traffic capacity of 1,000,000 Twenty-Foot equivalent units (TEUs) in 2002. Multinational corporations like Coca-Cola, Heineken, Unilever, Bridgestone and Eni Group have factories in this area. Within the metropolitan area at Sarroch there is one of the six oil refinery supersites in Europe, called Saras. The communications provider, Tiscali, has its headquarters in the boroughs of Cagliari.

== Main sights ==
=== Churches ===
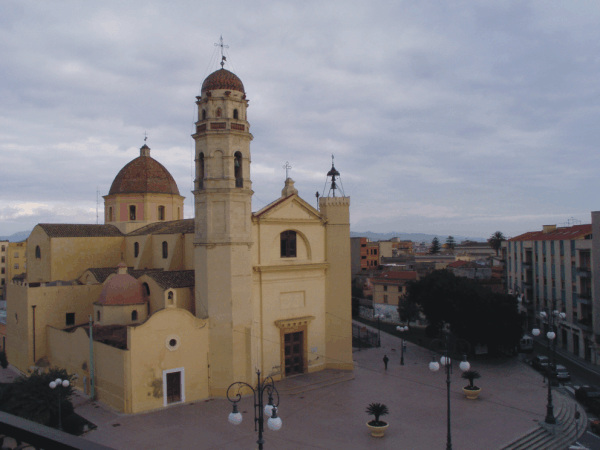
Saint Helena Empress Basilica, Quartu Sant'Elena

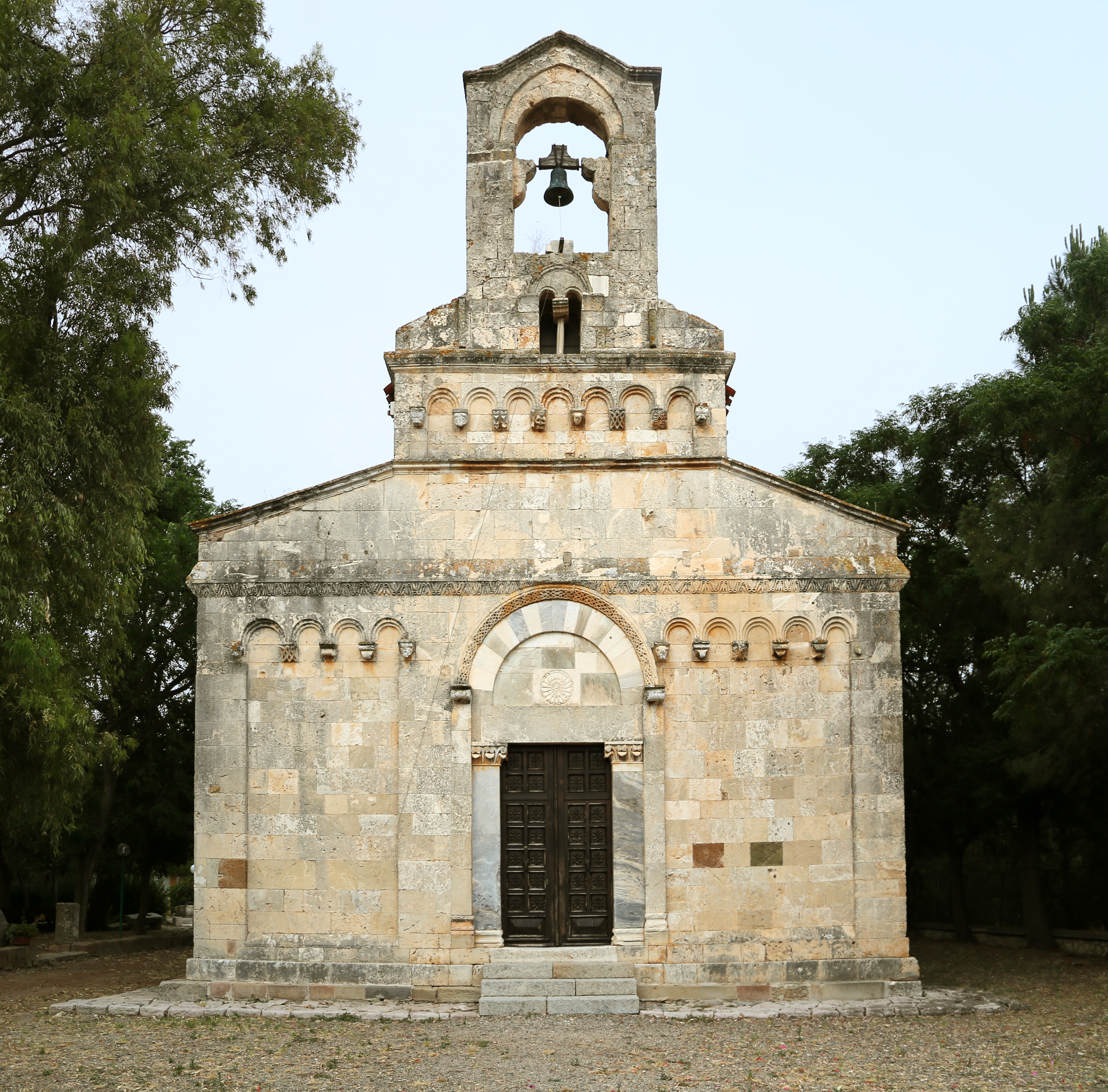
Romanesque church of Saint Mary, Uta

There are religious buildings in the metropolitan area that date back to the beginnings of the Christian presence in Sardinia. The crypts of the churches of Santa Restituta and Saint Ephysius in Cagliari are examples of cave churches officiated in the first centuries of the Christian era. The first church built after the Edict of Thessalonica of Theodosius I, who made Christianity the state religion of the Roman Empire, was the church of Saint Saturninus in Cagliari. Little now remains of the Byzantine period: the only building that survives, is the small church of San Giovanni in Assemini. However, there are many Romanesque churches, including the church of Saint Mary in Uta, and Baroque churches, such as the Shrine of Our Lady of Bonaria.

=== Archaeological sites ===
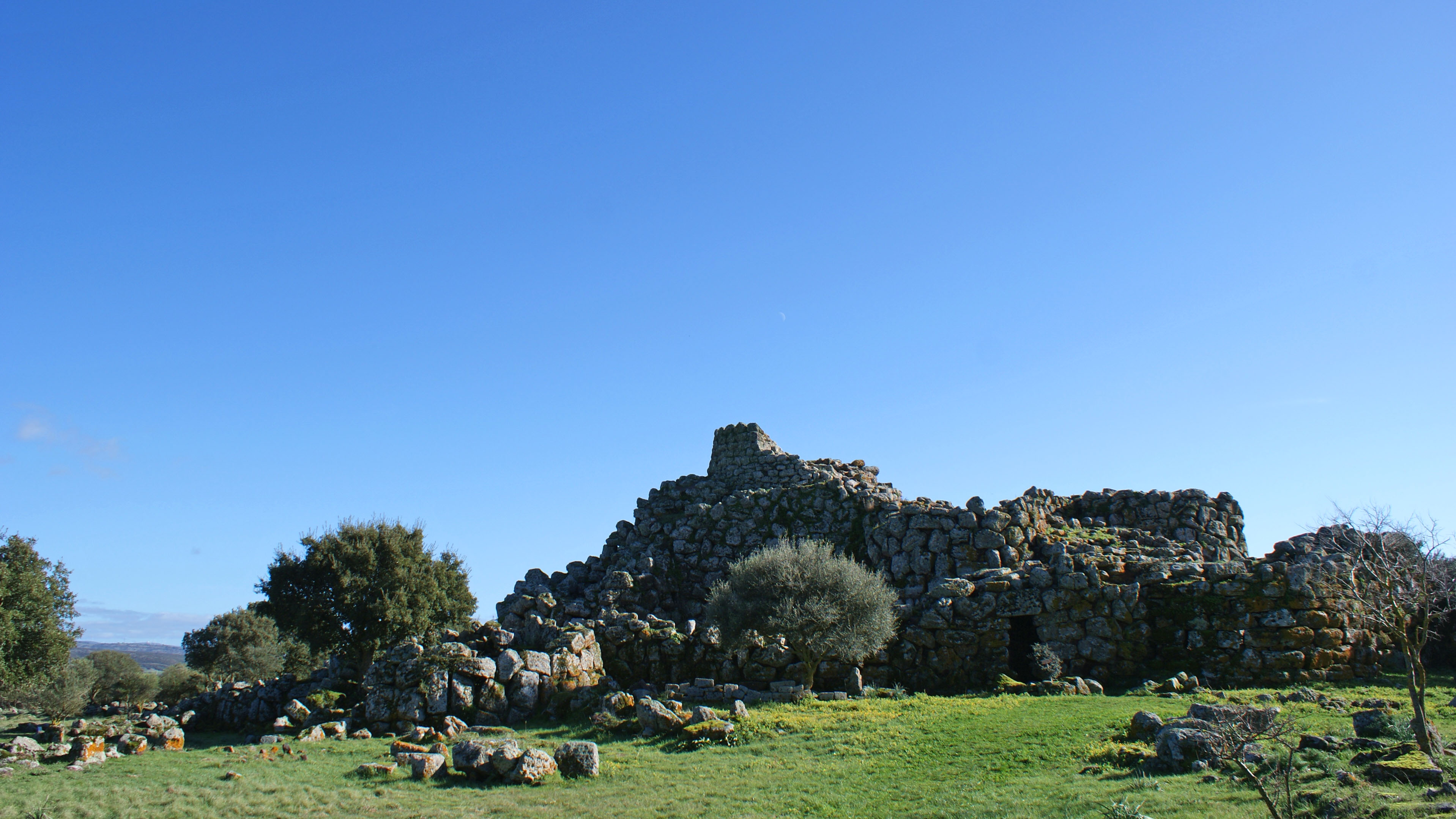
Nuraghe Arrubiu, Orroli

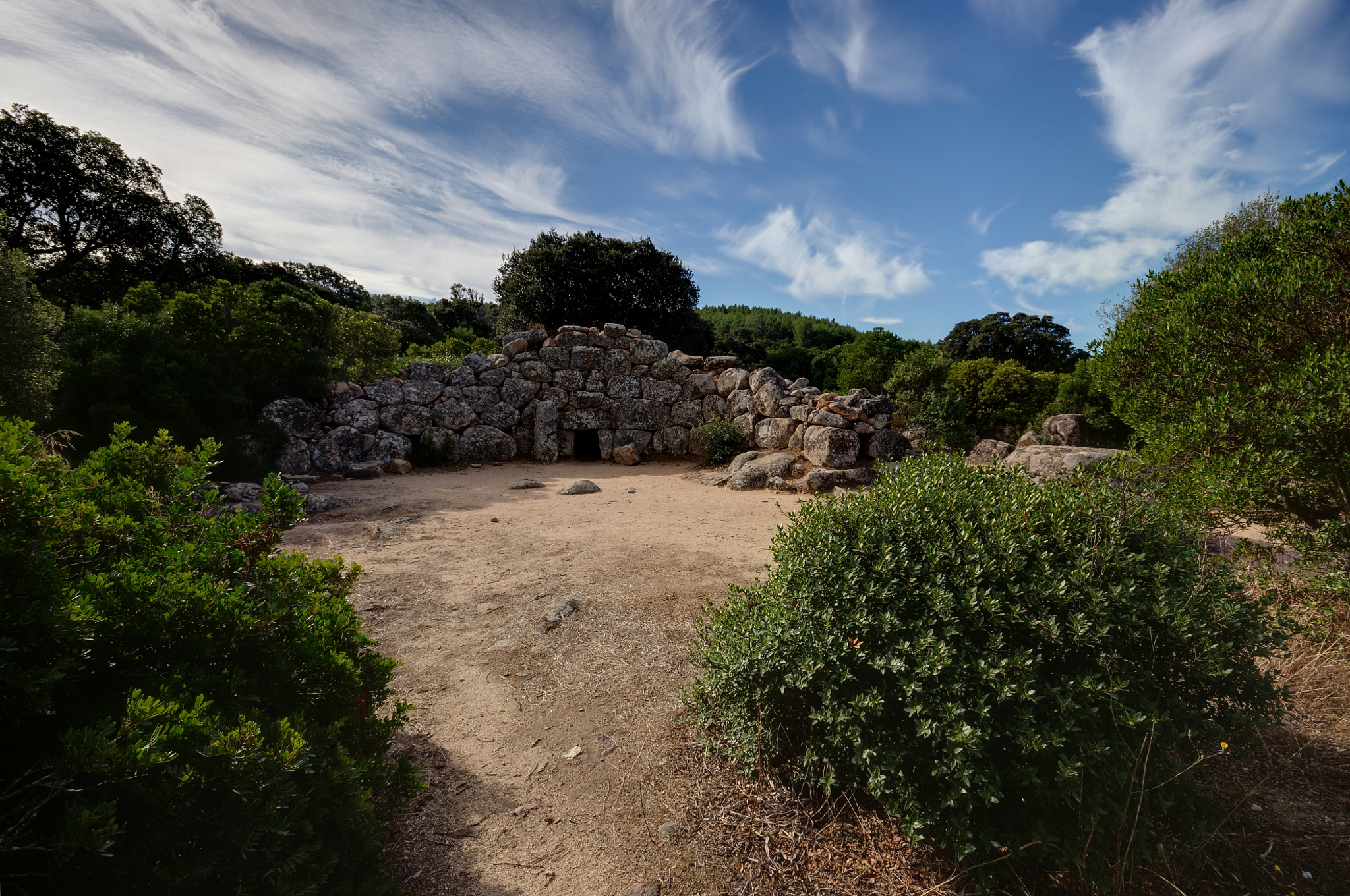
Is Concias Giant's Grave

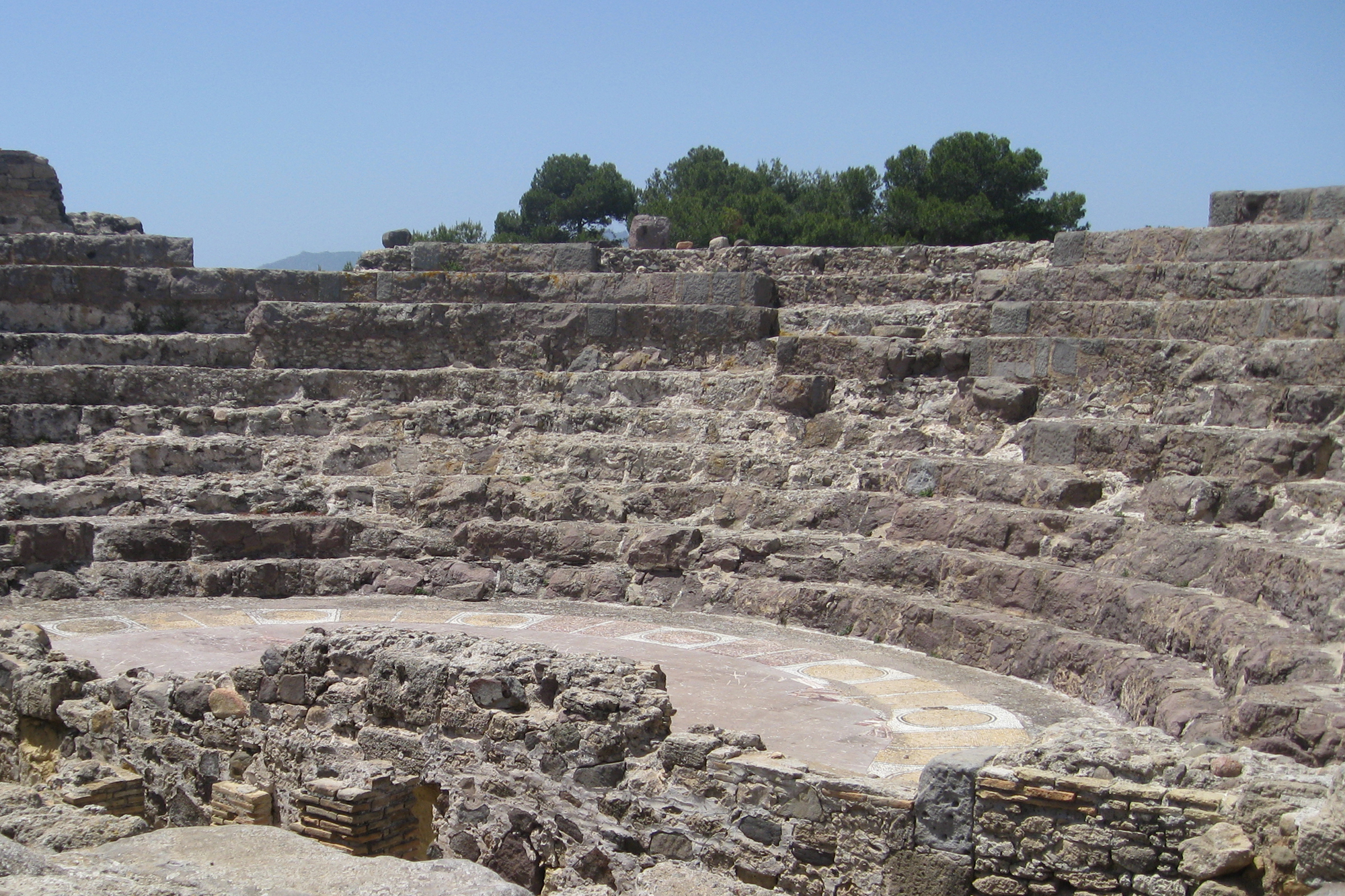
The Roman Theater at Nora

In the metropolitan area there are ruins of Neolithic and Chalcolithic villages, and several domus de Janas. There are also many nuraghes; the Nuraghe Diana on the coast of Quartu Sant'Elena and the nuraghes Sa Domu de S'Orcu and Antigori on the coast of Sarroch are particularly important. A deep, sacred well is located in Settimo San Pietro and a giants' grave, Is Concias, in the territory of Quartucciu. In the city of Nora, there are ruins of the Punic and Roman periods. The Tuvixeddu necropolis and a Roman Amphitheatre are located in Cagliari.

=== Metropolitan forests ===
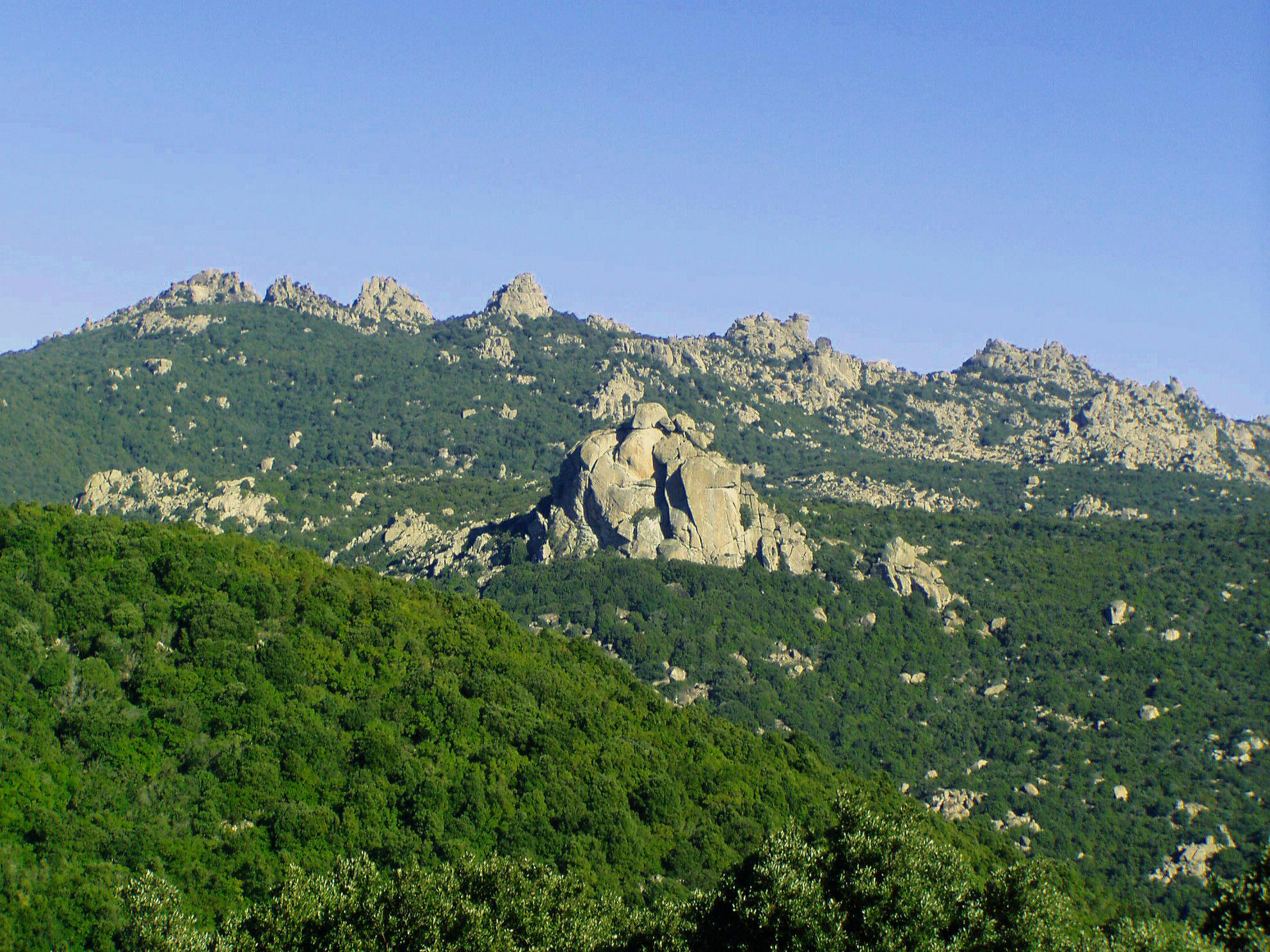
Sette Fratelli (Sardinian: Seti Fradis) Mountains

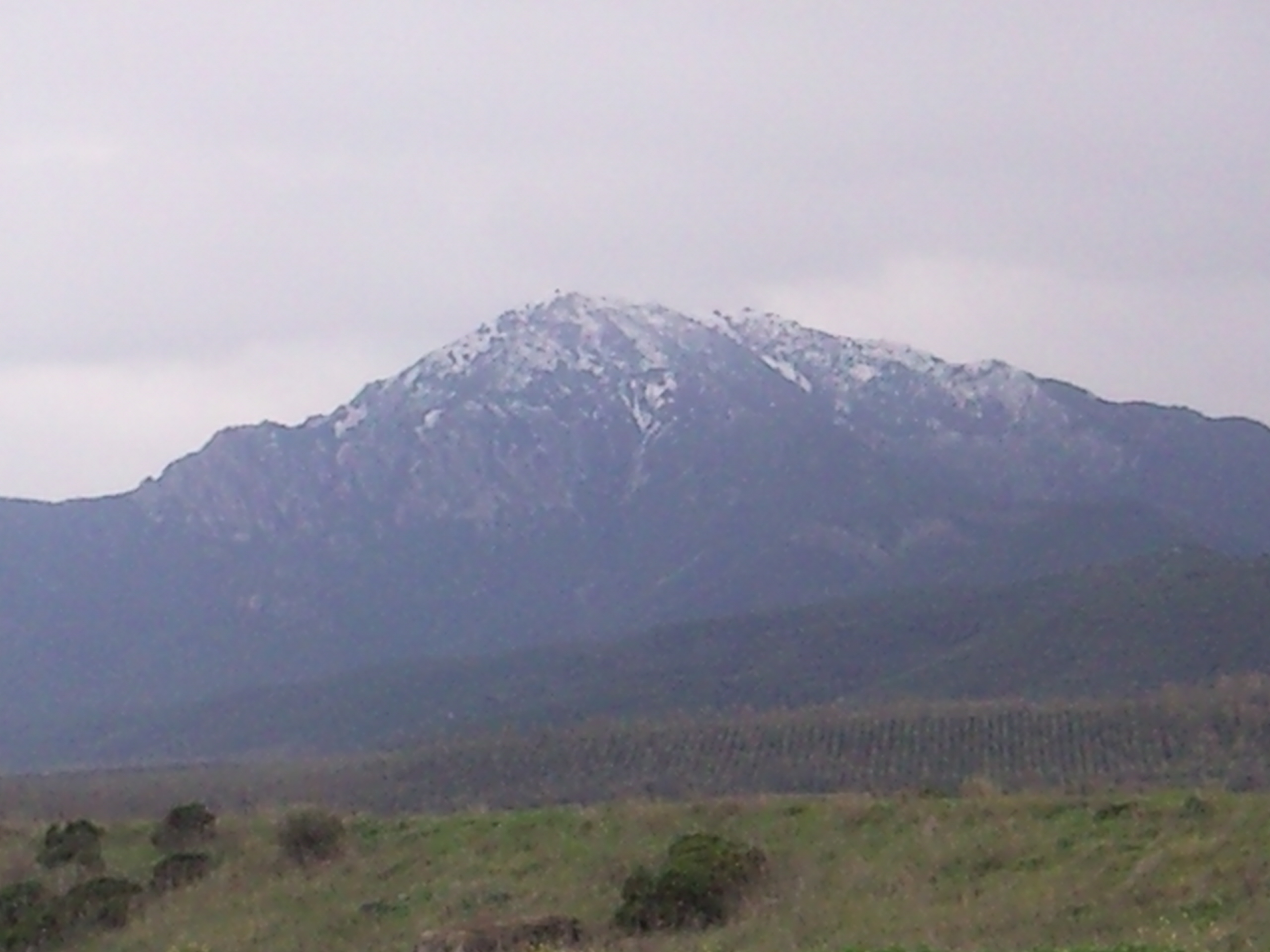
Monte Arcosu, WWF reserve

The metropolitan area is delimited to the east and west by high mountain ranges, largely covered by Mediterranean forests, dominated by evergreen, oak, cork oak, and arbutus. The forests are managed by the Regional Forest Agency and extend for 273 km^{2} (105 sq mi), about 22% of the total surface. To the west is the Monte Arcosu – Piscinamanna Forest which is 35,000 hectares (86,000 acres). Within this forest is the WWF (World Wildlife Fund) Monte Arcosu Oasis, created to protect the subspecies of Sardinian deer (Cervus elaphus ssp. Corsicanus). The oasis is 3,600 hectares (8,900 acres).

The Regional Agency manages other forests west of Cagliari City: Is Cannoneris is 4,768 hectares (11,780 acres), Monti Nieddu is 2,451 hectares (6,060 acres), and Gutturu Mannu is 4,768 hectares (11,780 acres). To the east, the Agency manages the Campidano Forest which is 1,600 hectares (4,000 acres), and the forest of the Sette Fratelli (Seti Fradis in Sardinian, to be translated into "Seven Brothers") which is about 10,000 hectares (25,000 acres). The mountain of Sette Fratelli, which is covered by the forest, is a vast massif with many crested peaks, seven of which are visible from Cagliari.

The environment of the metropolitan city varies with altitude in both temperature and precipitation. In the municipality of Pula, for example, the coastal plain has an annual average rainfall of about 450 mm (18 in), while the mountains (Is Cannoneris, about 800 meters above sea level) have more than 1,200 mm (47 in). The forests are populated by Sardinian deer (Cervus elaphus corsicanus), now saved from near-extinction, the fallow deer, reintroduced after its extinction from the area, wild boars, foxes, and European pine martens.

=== Metropolitan beaches ===
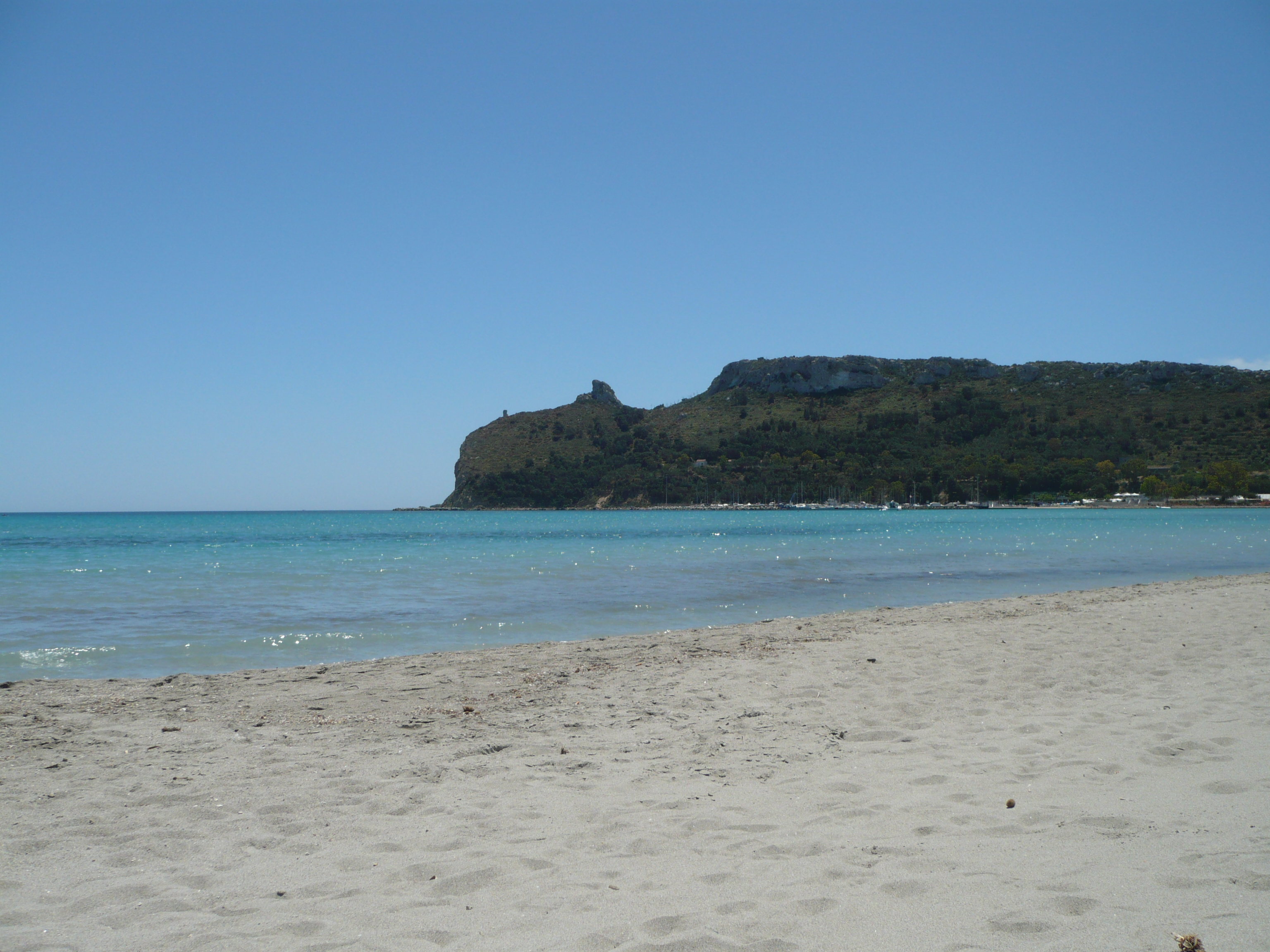
Poetto, Cagliari.

In the municipalities of the metropolitan area there are numerous beaches. One of the biggest is the Poetto beach of Cagliari and Quartu Sant'Elena, 10 km (6.2 mi) of fine sand in front of the Sella del Diavolo. To the east of Cagliari are the beaches of Geremeas (commune of Maracalagonis) and Solanas (commune of Sinnai), and to the west are the beaches of Nora and Santa Margherita (commune of Pula). The surrounding municipalities in the east and west, part of the Metropolitan City, of Villasimius, Castiadas, Muravera and Domus de Maria possess some of the most famous beaches of Sardinia.

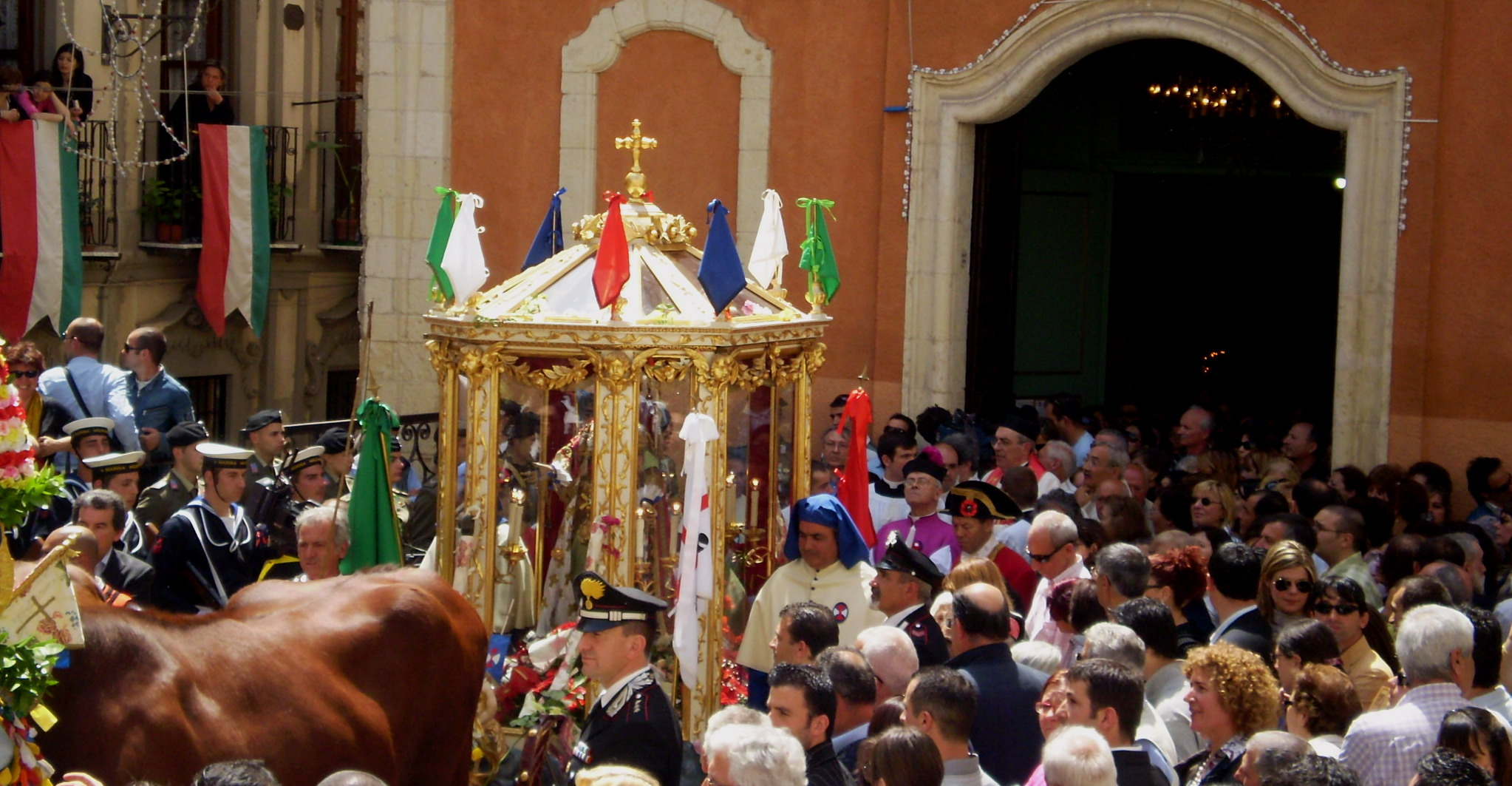
Religious festival of Sant'Efisio

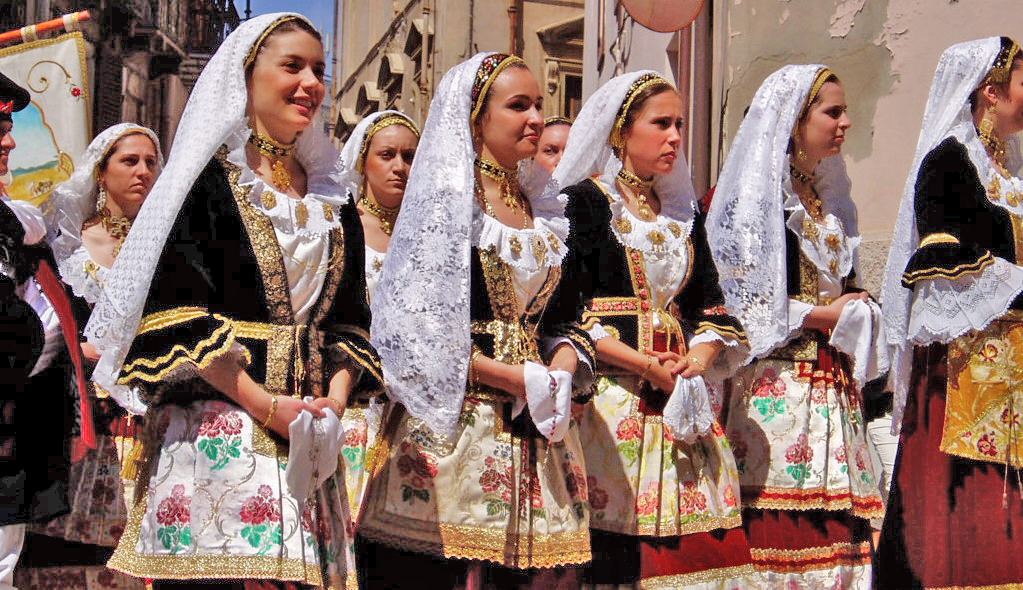
Selargius, traditional dress

== Folk customs and traditional dresses ==
The Sagra or feast of Saint Ephisius, 1 May, is the most gorgeous folk rite of the area. The statue of the Saint, loaded on a pompous carriage, is carried from the crypt where he was being held, to Nora where he was martyred. Its carriage, accompanied by Sardinian militiamen, the Alter Nos (the mayor's representative), folk groups wearing traditional clothes, on foot or on elaborately decorated waggons (traccas), and finally believers, proceeds for 32 km. Thousands of people, peasants and tourists alike, attend the event. On May 4, at dusk, the saint returns to the city, in a more intimate procession.

Another folk custom is sa coja antiga ( l'antico sposalizio selargino in Italian, or the antique selargino marriage in English), the traditional wedding ceremony typical of Selargius. Accompanied by religious songs in Sardinian language, the engaged couple approaches the altar, where they sign the marriage contract with the exchange of a love written promise that will be unveiled only after 25 years of marriage. After the ceremony, the groom puts his pinkie in the ring of a chain that surrounds the waist of the bride, an ancient token of bond.

== Language ==
The Metropolitan City's indigenous language is Sardinian in its Campidanese variety, but it is losing ground to Italian almost everywhere.

== Transportation ==
- CTM
- ARST
- Cagliari light rail
- Cagliari Elmas Airport
- Port of Cagliari
- Cagliari-Golfo Aranci Marittima railway
- Monserrato-Isili railway
