= Sadali, Sardinia =

Sadali Sàdali
- Comune
- Comune di Sadali
- Location within Sardinia
- Coordinates: 39°49′N 9°16′E
- Country: Italy
- Region: Sardinia
- Metropolitan city: Cagliari (CA)
- Frazioni: Esterzili, Nurri, Seui (OG), Seulo, Villanova Tulo

Area
  - Total: 49.88 km^{2} (19.26 sq mi)
- Elevation: 705 m (2,313 ft)

Population (2018-01-01)
  - Total: 1,054
  - Density: 21.13/km^{2} (54.73/sq mi)
- Time zone: UTC+1 (CET)
  - Summer (DST): UTC+2 (CEST)
- Postal code: 08030
- Dialing code: 0782
- ISTAT code: 091074
- Patron saint: San Valentino
- Website: Official website

Sadali (Sardinian: Sàdali) is a comune (municipality) in the Metropolitan City of Cagliari in the Italian island of Sardinia. As of 2006, it had a population of 1,054 and an area of 49.88 square kilometres (19.26 mi^{2}), which amounts to about 21 people per square kilometre (55/sq mi). It is one of I Borghi più belli d'Italia ("The most beautiful villages of Italy").

== Geography ==
Sadali borders the following municipalities: Esterzili, Nurri, Seui (Province of Ogliastra), Seulo, and Villanova Tulo.
