= Esterzili =

Esterzili Istersili
- Comune
- Comune di Esterzili
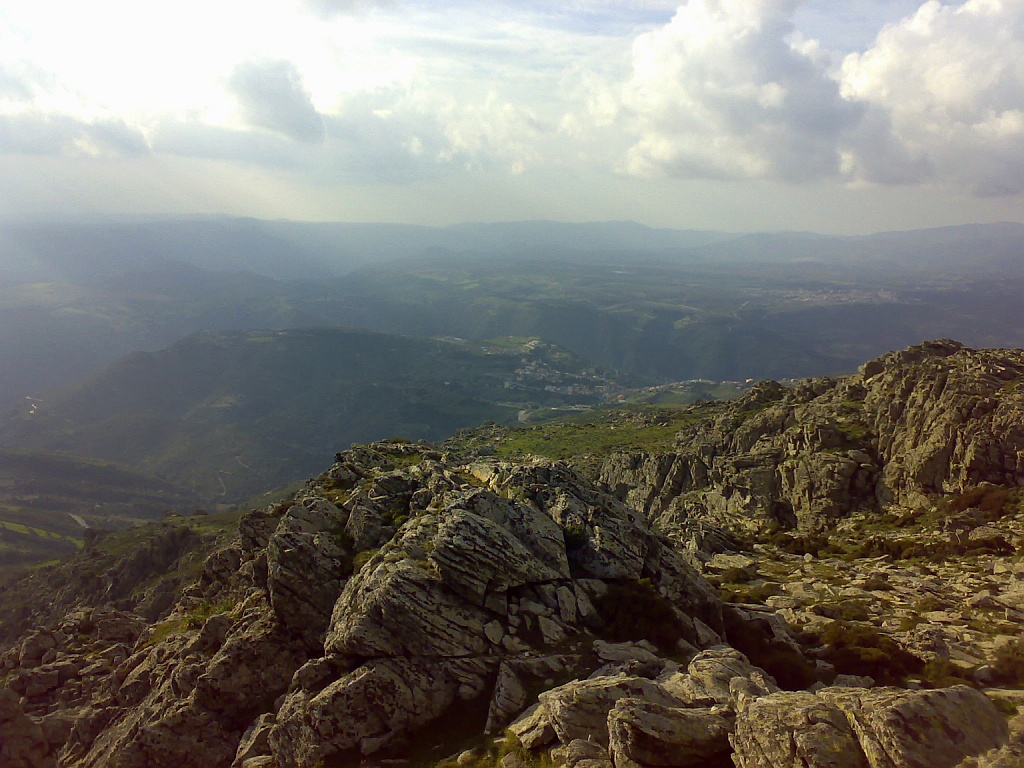
- View from the S. Vittoria mountain

- Coat of arms

- Location within Sardinia
- Coordinates: 39°47′N 9°17′E
- Country: Italy
- Region: Sardinia
- Metropolitan city: Cagliari (CA)

Government
  - Mayor: Giovanna Melis

Area
  - Total: 100.74 km^{2} (38.90 sq mi)
- Elevation: 731 m (2,398 ft)

Population (2026)
  - Total: 536
  - Density: 5.32/km^{2} (13.8/sq mi)
- Demonym: Esterzilesi
- Time zone: UTC+1 (CET)
  - Summer (DST): UTC+2 (CEST)
- Postal code: 08030
- Dialing code: 0782

Esterzili (Sardinian: Italy, Stersili) is a village and comune (municipality) in the Metropolitan City of Cagliari in the autonomous island region of Sardinia in Italy, located about 100 kilometres (62 mi) north of Cagliari. It has 536 inhabitants.

Esterzili borders the municipalities: Escalaplano, Nurri, Orroli, Sadali, Seui, and Ulassai.

== Demographics ==
As of 2026, the population is 536, of which 49.1% are male, and 50.9% are female. Minors make up 8.6% of the population, and seniors make up 36.0%.

Historical population

Year	Pop.	±%
1861	714	—
1871	756	+5.9%
1881	748	−1.1%
1901	1,012	+35.3%
1911	1,148	+13.4%
1921	1,126	−1.9%
1931	1,245	+10.6%
1936	1,284	+3.1%

Year	Pop.	±%
1951	1,445	+12.5%
1961	1,641	+13.6%
1971	1,390	−15.3%
1981	1,235	−11.2%
1991	950	−23.1%
2001	844	−11.2%
2011	721	−14.6%
2021	565	−21.6%

Source: ISTAT

=== Immigration ===
As of 2025, immigrants make up 1.3% of the total population. The foreign countries of birth are Romania, Argentina, Brazil, Germany, and Kyrgyzstan.
