= Silius =

- Comune
- Comune di Silius
- Location within Sardinia
- Coordinates: 39°31′N 9°18′E
- Country: Italy
- Region: Sardinia
- Metropolitan city: Cagliari (CA)
- Frazioni: Ballao, Goni, San Basilio, San Nicolò Gerrei, Siurgus Donigala

Area
  - Total: 38.34 km^{2} (14.80 sq mi)
- Elevation: 585 m (1,919 ft)

Population (2001)
  - Total: 1,384
  - Density: 36.10/km^{2} (93.49/sq mi)
- Demonym: Siliesi
- Time zone: UTC+1 (CET)
  - Summer (DST): UTC+2 (CEST)
- Postal code: 09040
- Dialing code: 070
- ISTAT code: 092079
- Patron saint: Santa Felicita, Santa Perpetua

Silius is a town and comune in the Metropolitan City of Cagliari, Sardinia, Italy. In 2001 it had a population of 1,384.
