= Goni, Sardinia =

Goni
- Comune
- Comune di Goni
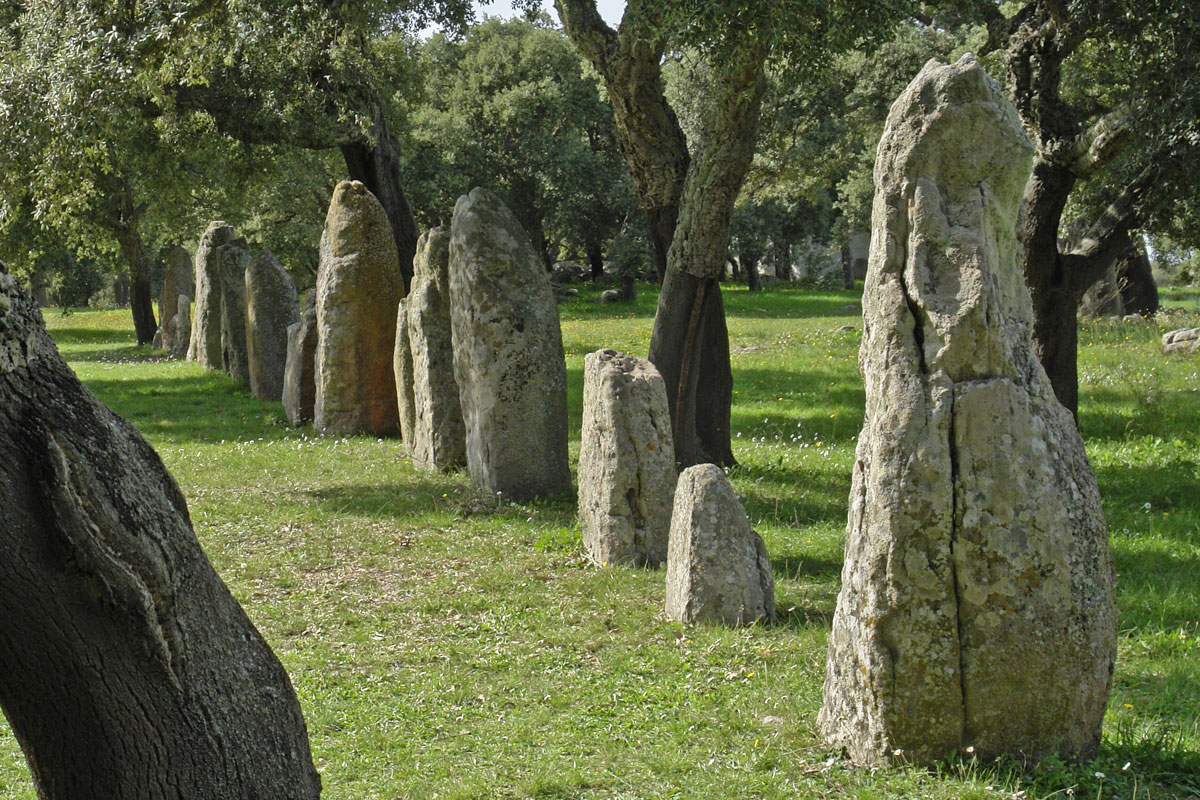
- Menhirs at Pranu Mutteddu

- Location within Italy
- Coordinates: 39°35′N 9°17′E
- Country: Italy
- Region: Sardinia
- Metropolitan city: Cagliari (CA)
- Frazioni: Ballao, Escalaplano, Orroli, Silius, Siurgus Donigala

Government
  - Mayor: Giovanni Maria Cabras

Area
  - Total: 18.71 km^{2} (7.22 sq mi)
- Elevation: 383 m (1,257 ft)

Population (2018-01-01)
  - Total: 556
  - Density: 29.7/km^{2} (77.0/sq mi)
- Time zone: UTC+1 (CET)
  - Summer (DST): UTC+2 (CEST)
- Postal code: 09040
- Dialing code: 070
- ISTAT code: 092027
- Website: Official website

Goni is a town and comune in the Metropolitan City of Cagliari, Sardinia, Italy.
