= San Nicolò Gerrei =

San Nicolò Gerrei Pauli Gerrei
- Comune
- Comune di San Nicolò Gerrei
- Coat of arms

- Location within Sardinia
- Coordinates: 39°30′N 9°18′E
- Country: Italy
- Region: Sardinia
- Metropolitan city: Cagliari (CA)

Government
  - Mayor: Marcello Mura

Area
  - Total: 62.6 km^{2} (24.2 sq mi)
- Elevation: 365 m (1,198 ft)

Population (30 November 2010)
  - Total: 881
  - Density: 14.1/km^{2} (36.5/sq mi)
- Time zone: UTC+1 (CET)
  - Summer (DST): UTC+2 (CEST)
- Postal code: 09040
- Dialing code: 070

San Nicolò Gerrei (Sardinian: Pauli Gerrei) is a comune (municipality) in the Metropolitan City of Cagliari in the Italian region Sardinia, located about 35 kilometres (22 miles) northeast of Cagliari, in the Gerrei traditional subregion.

San Nicolò Gerrei borders the following municipalities: Armungia, Ballao, Dolianova, San Basilio, Sant'Andrea Frius, Silius, Villasalto.

== See also ==
- Pauli Gerrei trilingual inscription
