= Escalaplano =

Escalaplano Iscalepranu (Sardinian)
- Comune
- Comune di Escalaplano
- Coat of arms

- Location within Sardinia
- Coordinates: 39°37′N 9°21′E
- Country: Italy
- Region: Sardinia
- Metropolitan city: Cagliari (CA)

Government
  - Mayor: Marco Lampis

Area
  - Total: 93.8 km^{2} (36.2 sq mi)
- Elevation: 338 m (1,109 ft)

Population (30 November 2009)
  - Total: 2,301
  - Density: 24.5/km^{2} (63.5/sq mi)
- Time zone: UTC+1 (CET)
  - Summer (DST): UTC+2 (CEST)
- Postal code: 08043
- Dialing code: 070

Escalaplano (Italian: [eskalaˈplaːno]; Sardinian: Scalepranu or Iscalepranu [(i)skalɛˈβɾanu]) is a comune (municipality) in the Metropolitan City of Cagliari in the Italian region Sardinia, located about 50 kilometres (31 mi) northeast of Cagliari.

Escalaplano borders the following municipalities: Ballao, Esterzili, Goni, Orroli, Perdasdefogu, Seui, Villaputzu.
