= Palazzo Regio =

Building in Cagliari, Italy

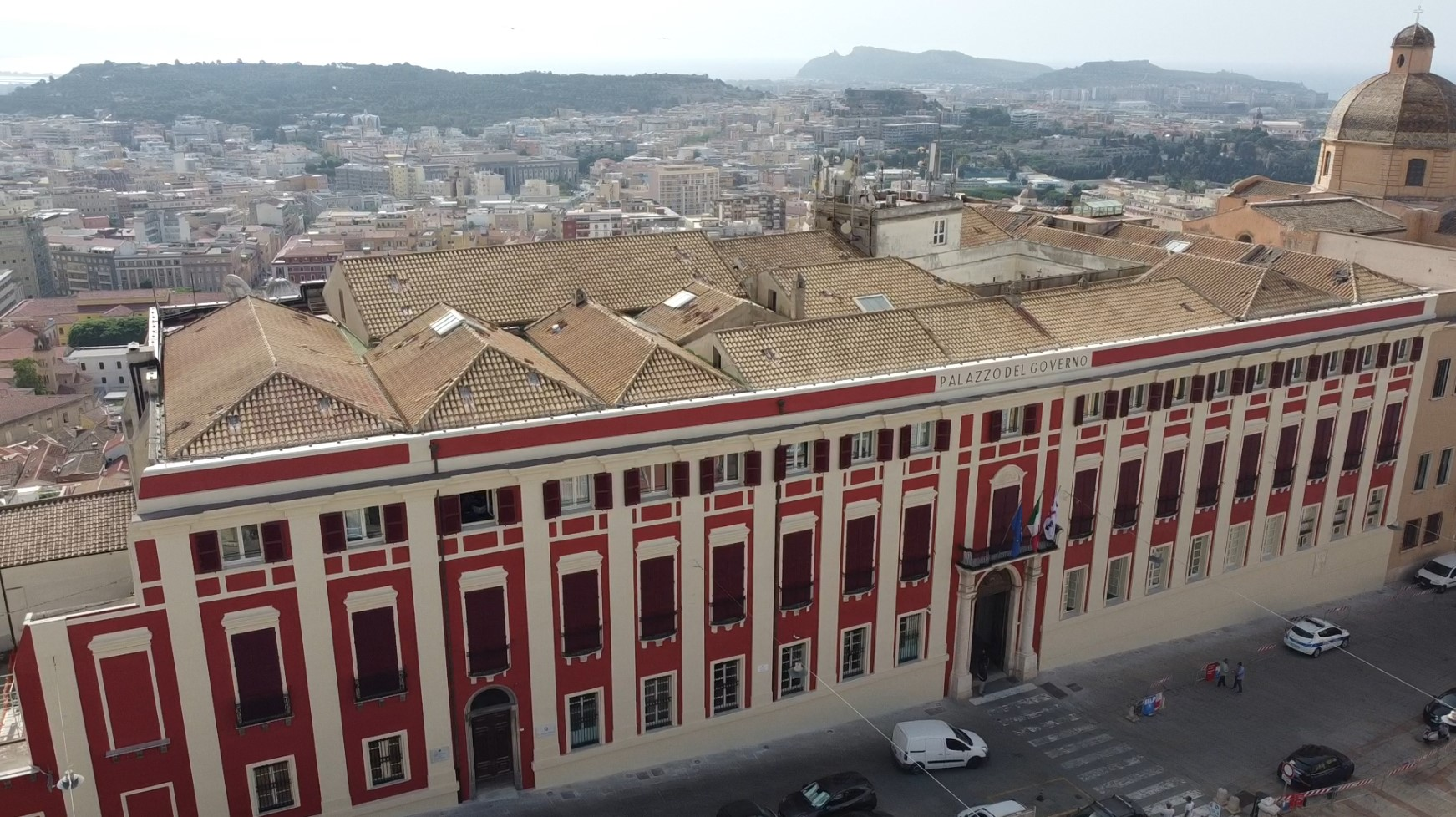
- View of the Palazzo Regio in the Castello district of Cagliari.

- Location within Italy

General information
- Location: Cagliari
- Coordinates: 39.219167°N 9.117222°E
- Construction started: 13th century

The Palazzo Regio ("Royal Palace"), also known as the Viceregio ("Viceroyal Palace"), is a historic building in Cagliari. It was the official residence of the representative of the King of Sardinia during the periods of Aragonese, Spanish, and Savoy rule. Today, it serves as the seat of the Metropolitan City of Cagliari. The palace is located in the historic Castello district.

== History ==
The building had been originally built in the 13th century by the Pisans and became the seat of the governors, and later Viceroys of Sardinia, since 1337, at the behest of Peter IV of Aragon. Over the centuries the building underwent several modifications and extensions. Particularly significant were the 18th century restorations; in 1730, at the hands of the Piedmontese engineers de Guibert and de Vincenti, the grand staircase was built leading to the main floor, the rooms of which were restored in 1735 by della Vallea. The west façade, with the main portal in line with the staircase, was arranged by 1769, as evidenced by the inscription on the window bezel door that opens onto the central balcony.

Between 1799 and 1815 the palace was the official residence of the royal family and the court, in exile from Turin occupied by Napoleon.

In 1885 the palace became property of the Province, who established its representative office and oversaw the restoration of the interior, in order to adapt to the new function. In 1893 began the work of decoration on the Council room, by the Perugian Domenico Bruschi for the frescoes and dell'Angeletti for the stuccos. The work was completed in 1896.

== Gallery ==
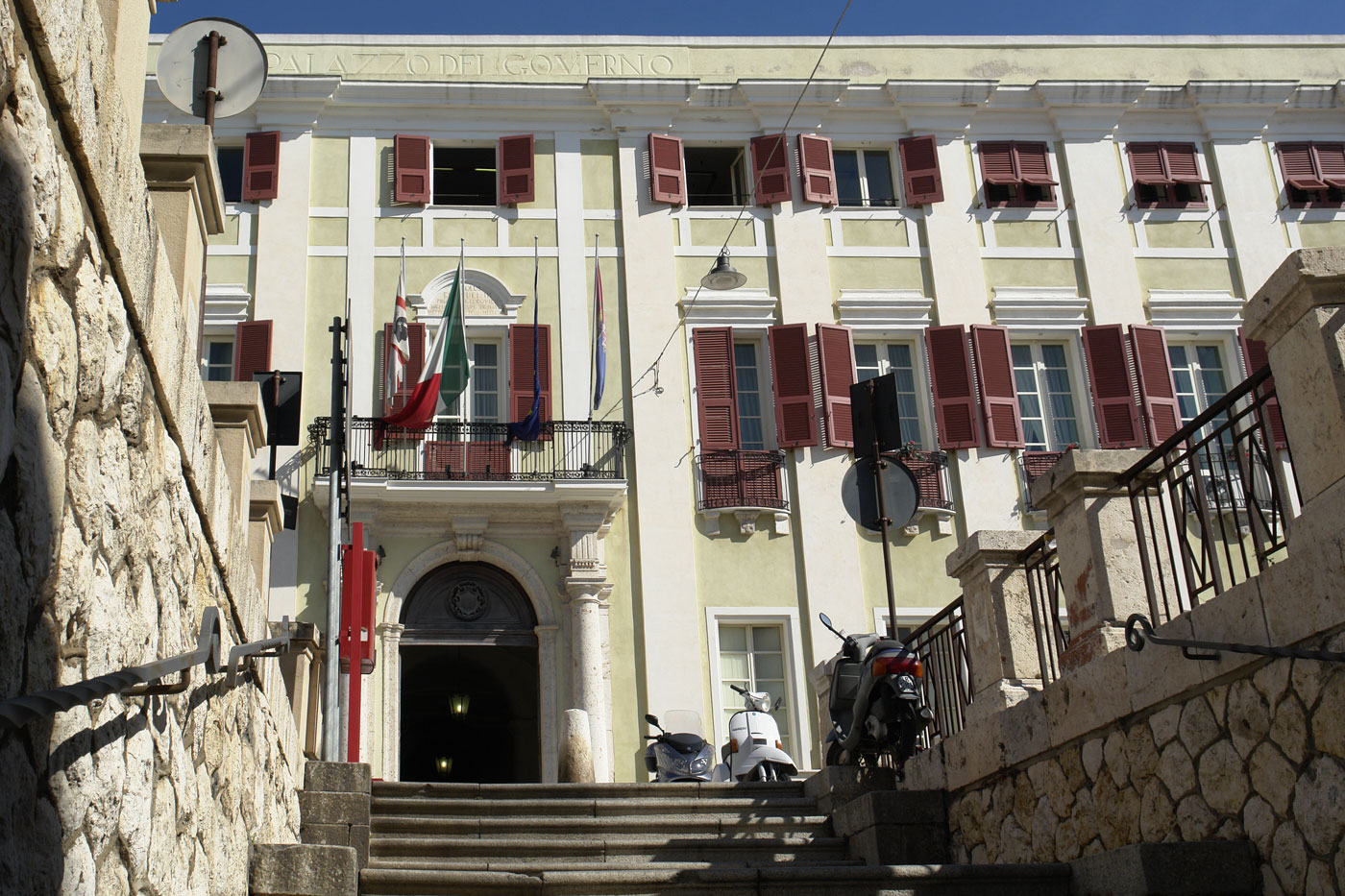
Main entrance of the Palazzo Regio

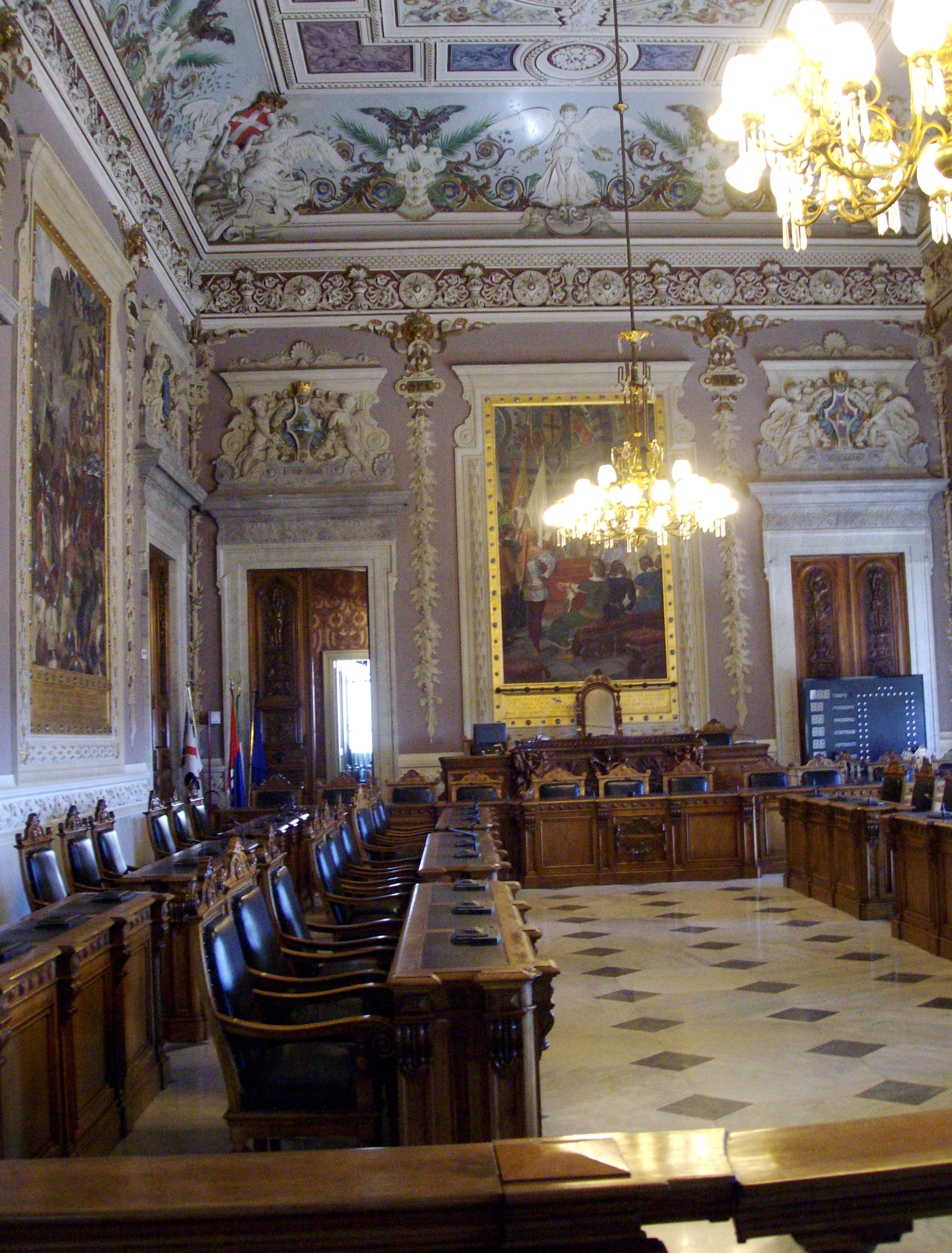
Interior

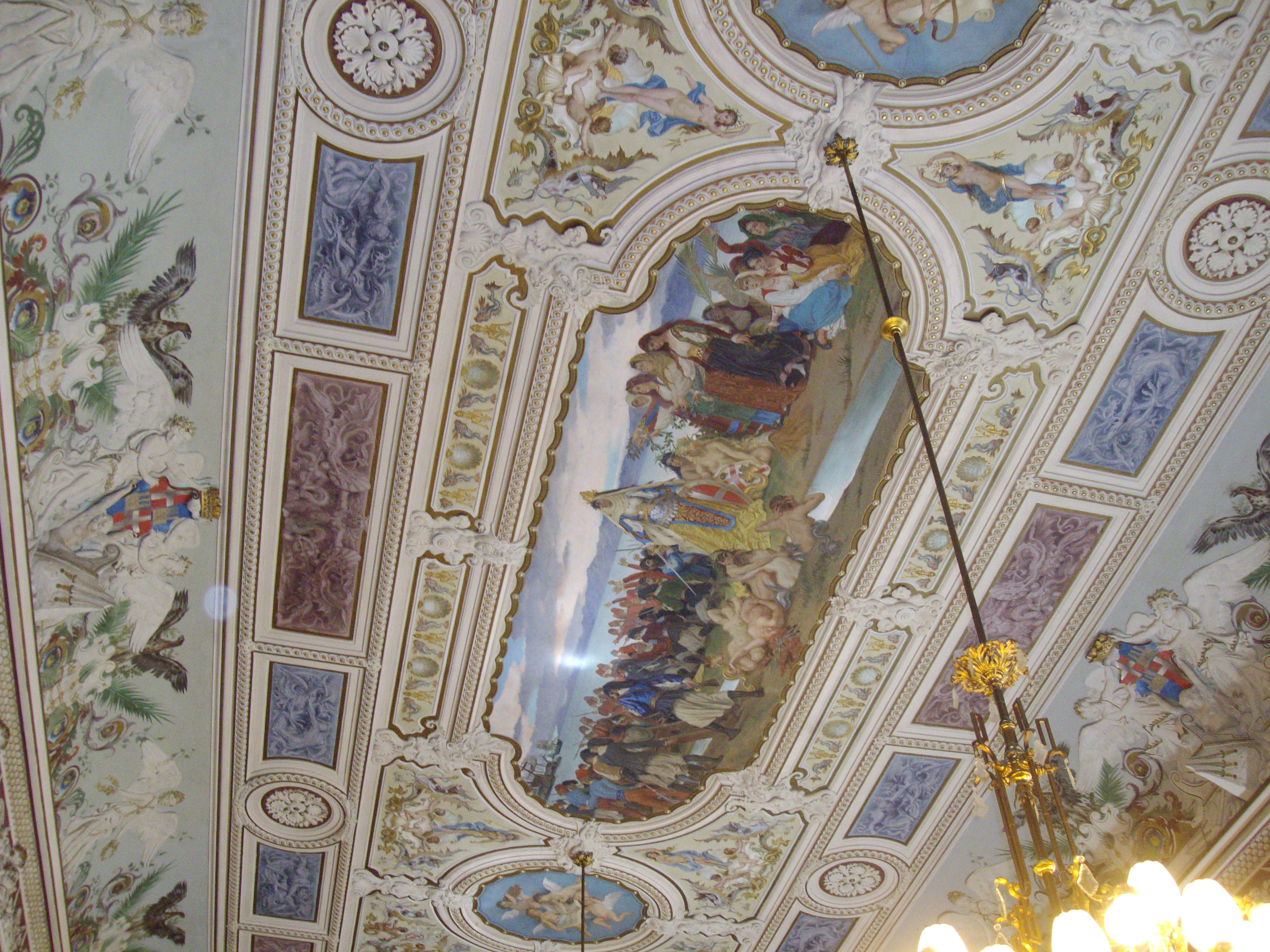
Frescoes

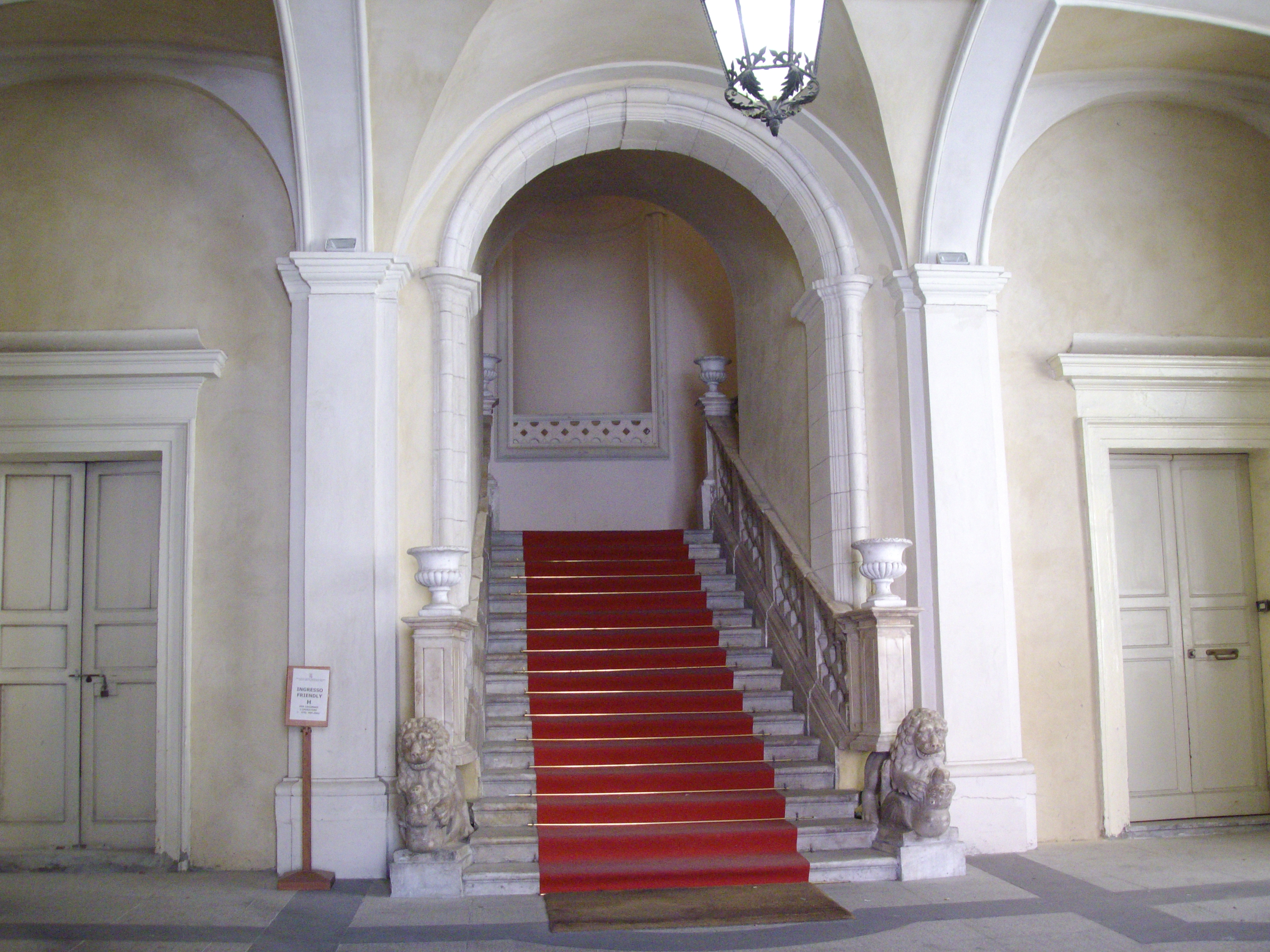
Stairs

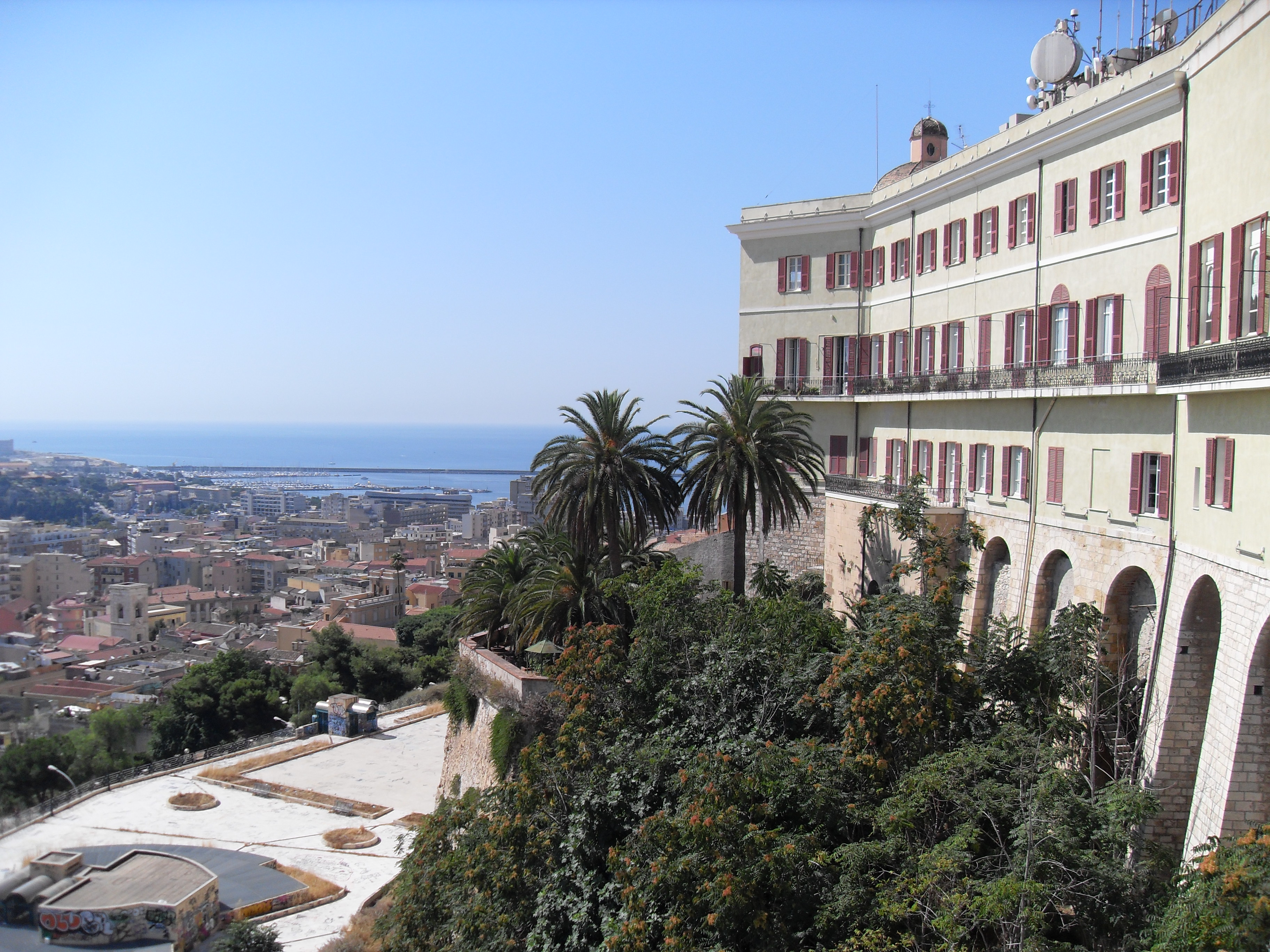
Eastern façade

== Bibliography ==
- Salvatore Naitza. Architettura dal tardo '600 al classicismo purista. Nuoro, Ilisso, 1992. ISBN 88-85098-20-7
- Maria Grazia Scano. Pittura e scultura dell'Ottocento. Nuoro, Ilisso, 1997. ISBN 88-85098-56-8
