= Nuraghe Arrubiu =

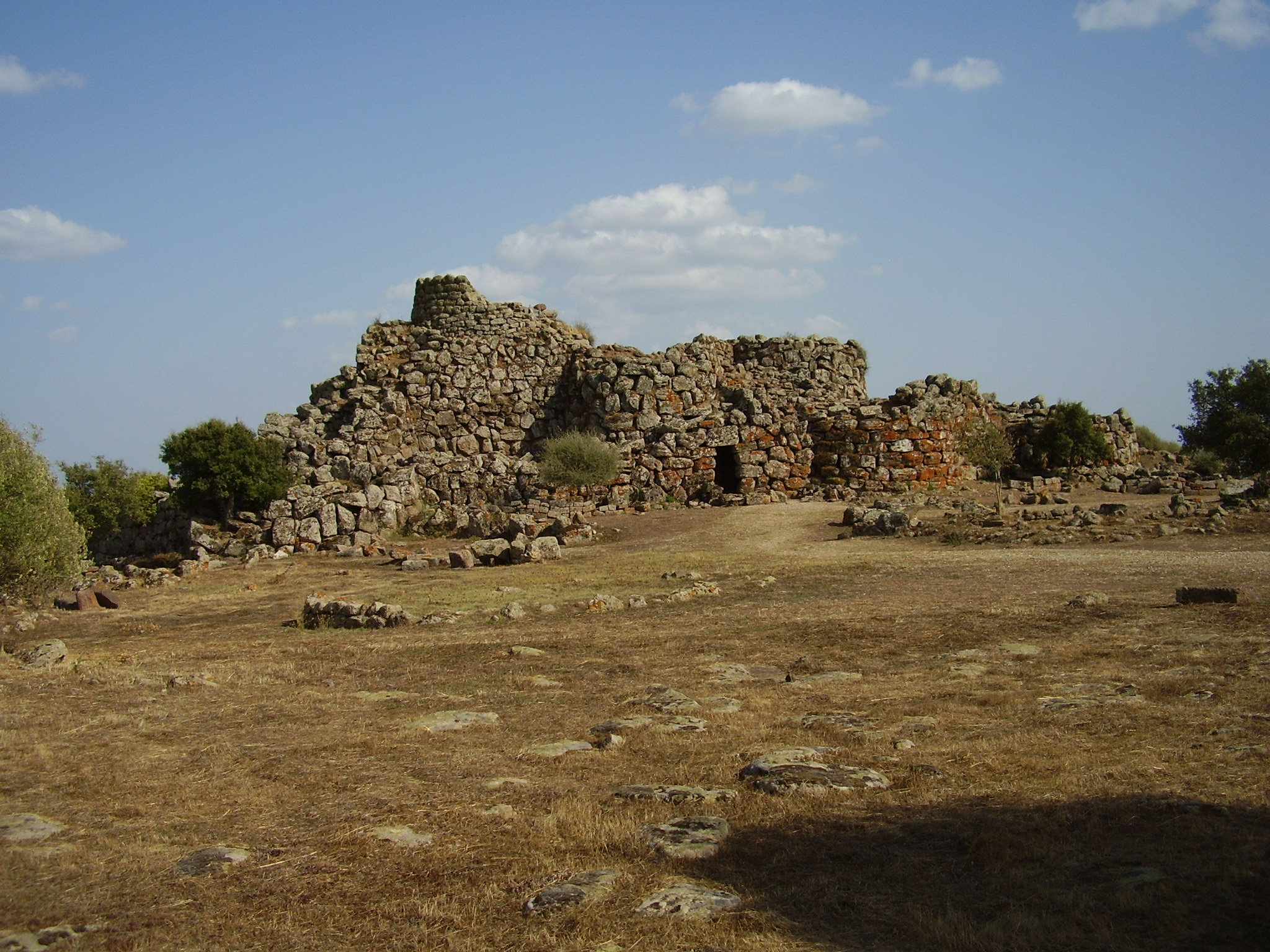

- Location in Sardinia, Italy
- 39.6624°N 9.2974°E
- Type: Settlement
- Location: Orroli, Sardinia, Italy

History
- Built: c. 1450 BC

The Nuraghe Arrubiu is one of the largest nuraghes in Sardinia. It is in Orroli, in the province of South Sardinia. Its name means "red nuraghe" in Sardinian, which derives from the basalt stones it had been built with.

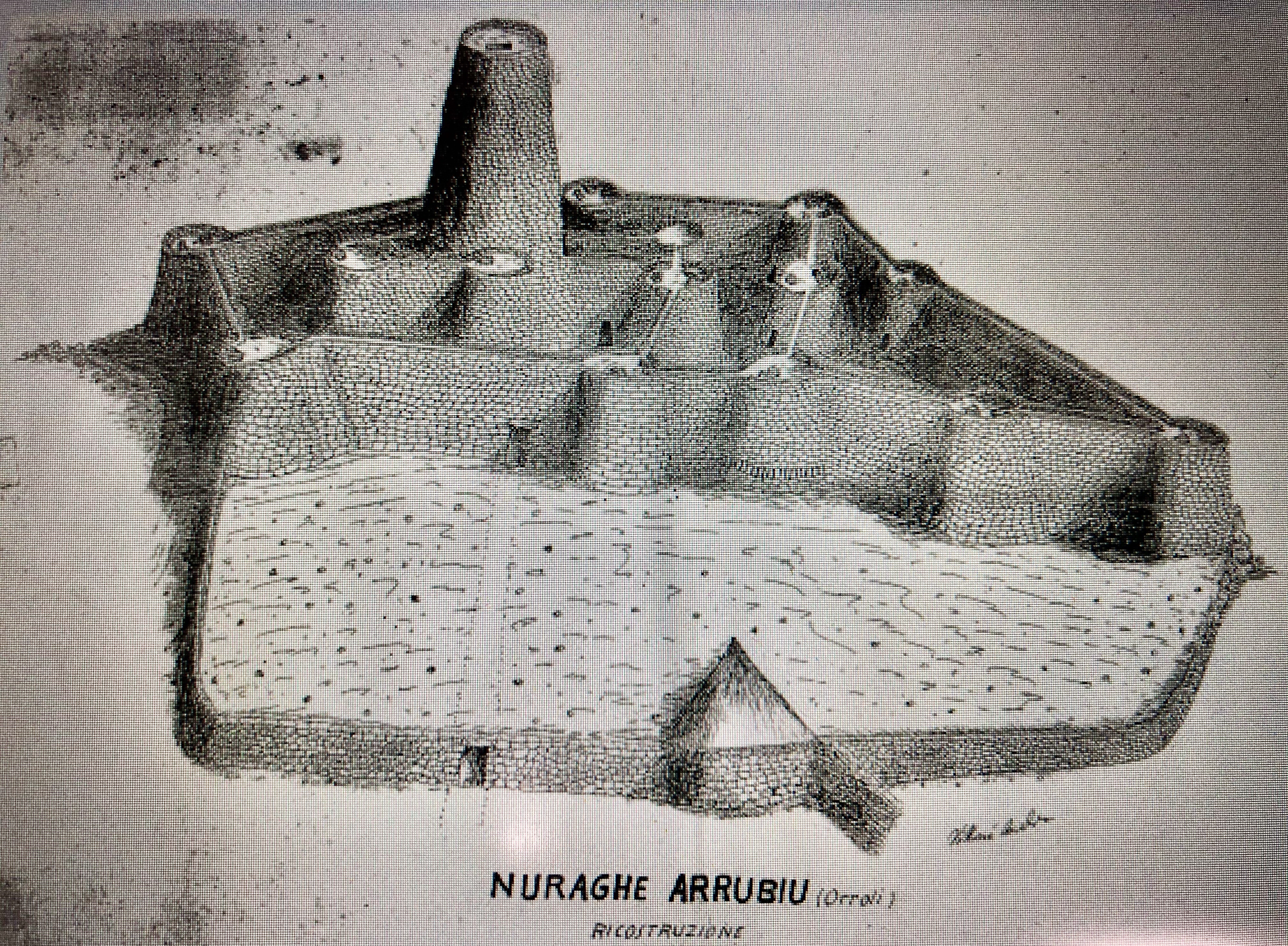
Reconstruction of Nuraghe Arrubiu by Vittorio Anedda

The settlement was built during the 15th century BC; the main tower originally reached a height of between 25 and 30 metres, making it one of the tallest structures in Bronze Age Europe. The main structure, which is made up of five towers, is protected by two secondary walls, making a total of 21 towers. The area covered by the complex is around 3,000 square metres. The nuraghe was also provided with a complex drainage system that provided the cistern with water.

== Gallery ==
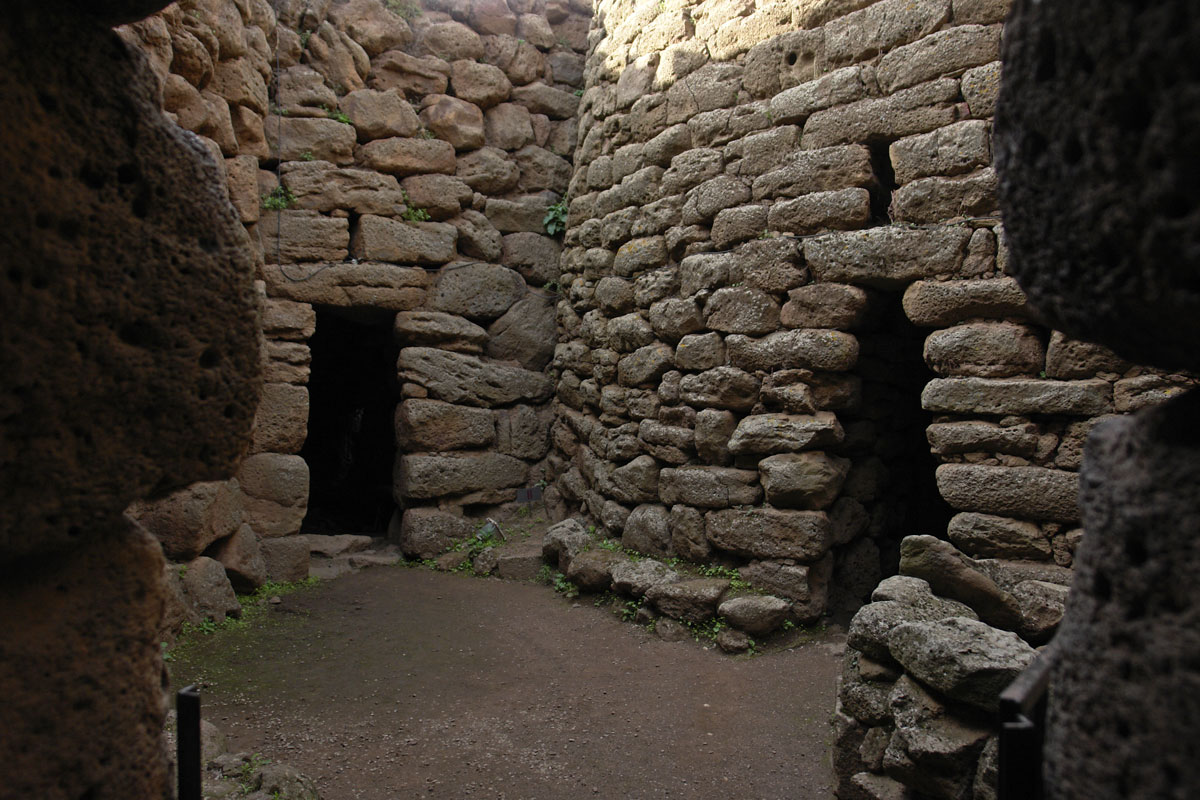
Courtyard

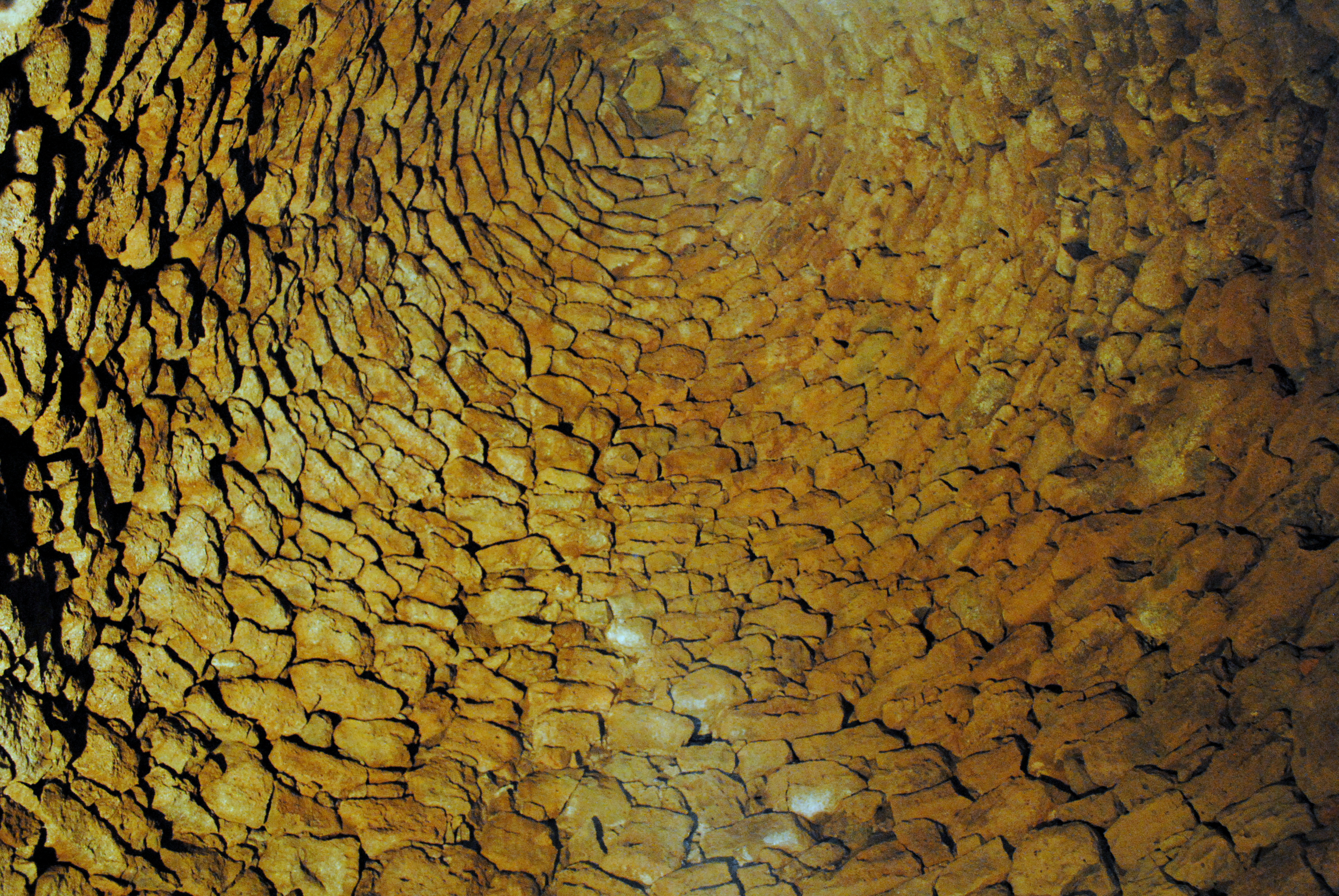
Tholos

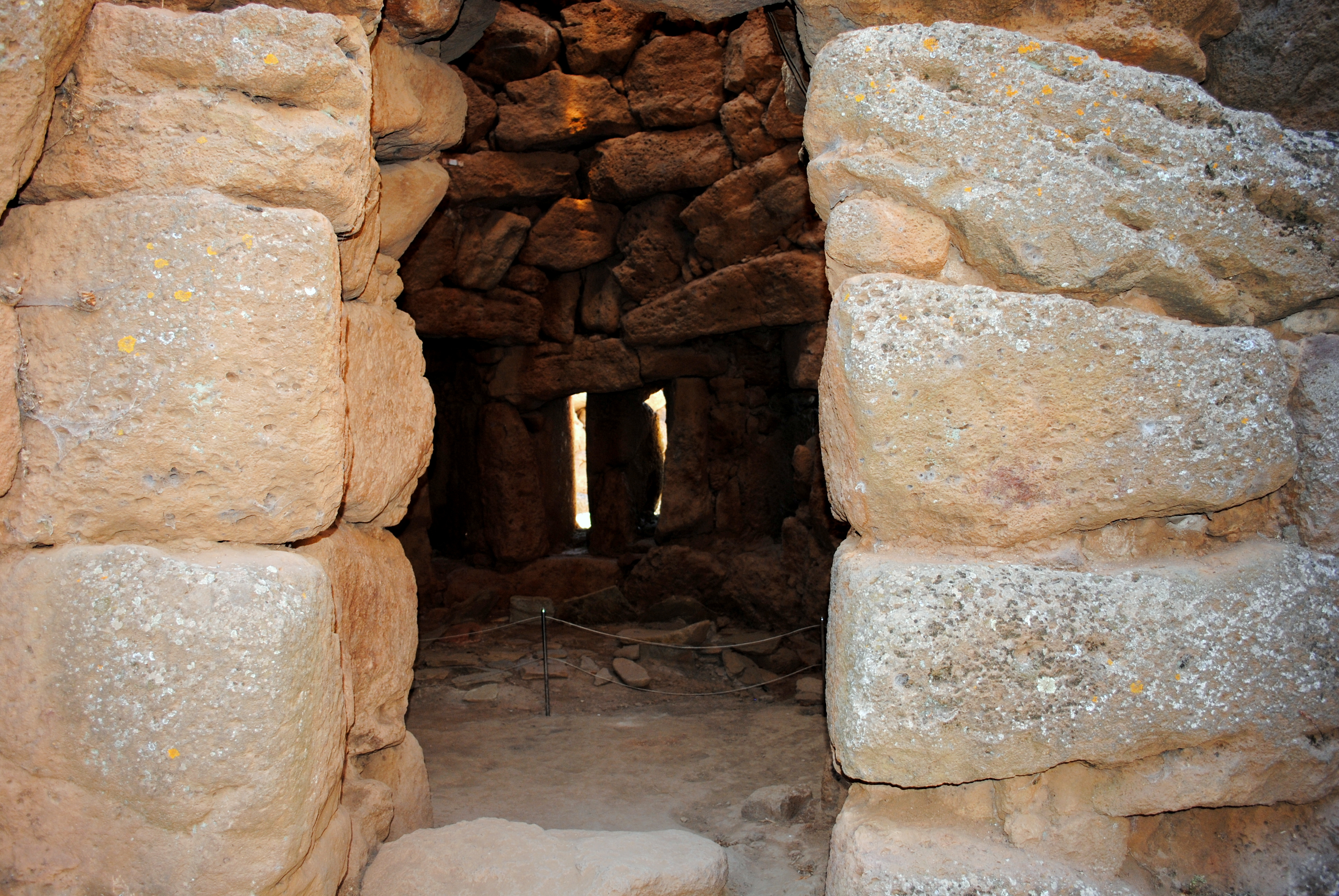
Entrance

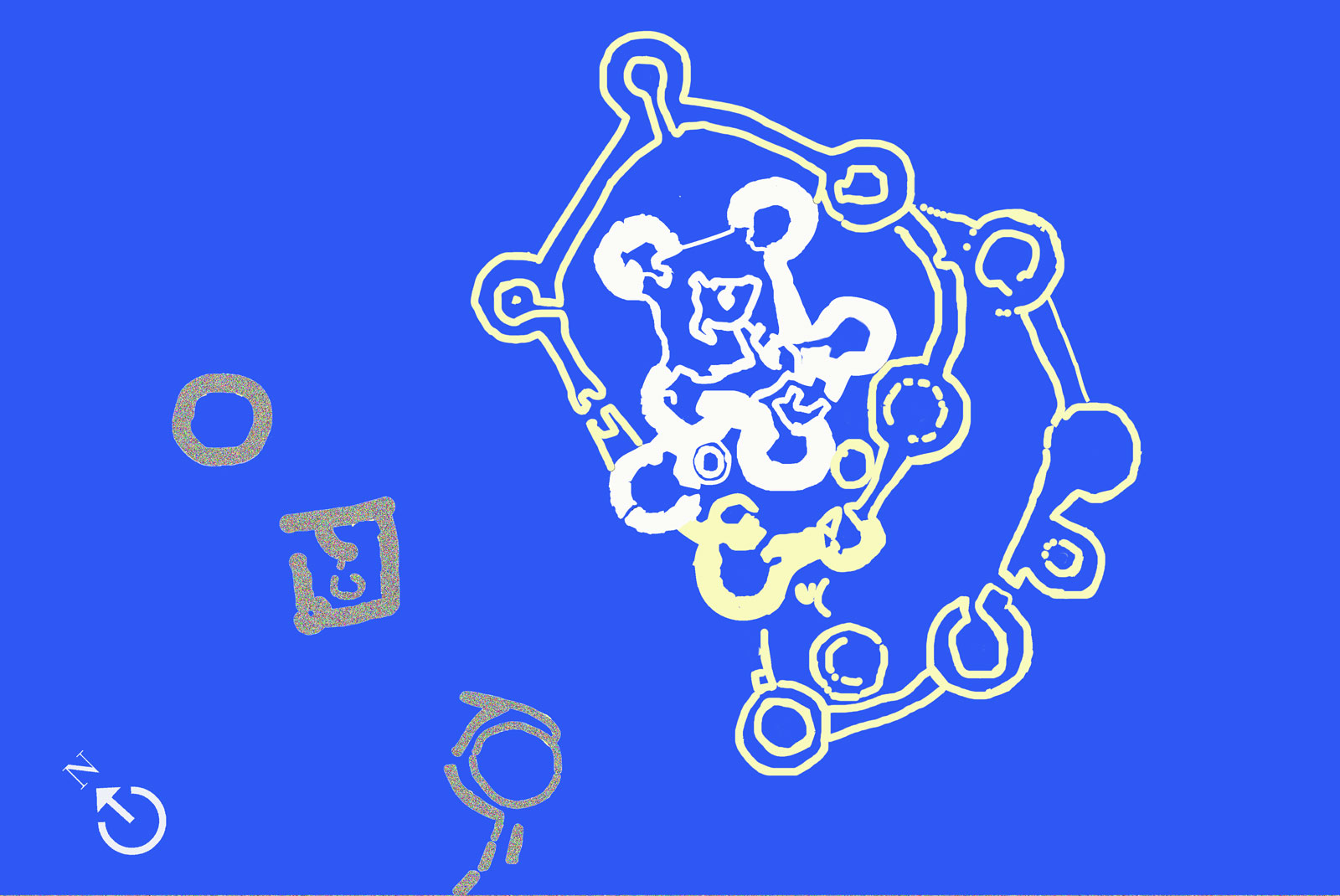
Plan

== See also ==
- Su Nuraxi
- Talaiot
