= Flumendosa =

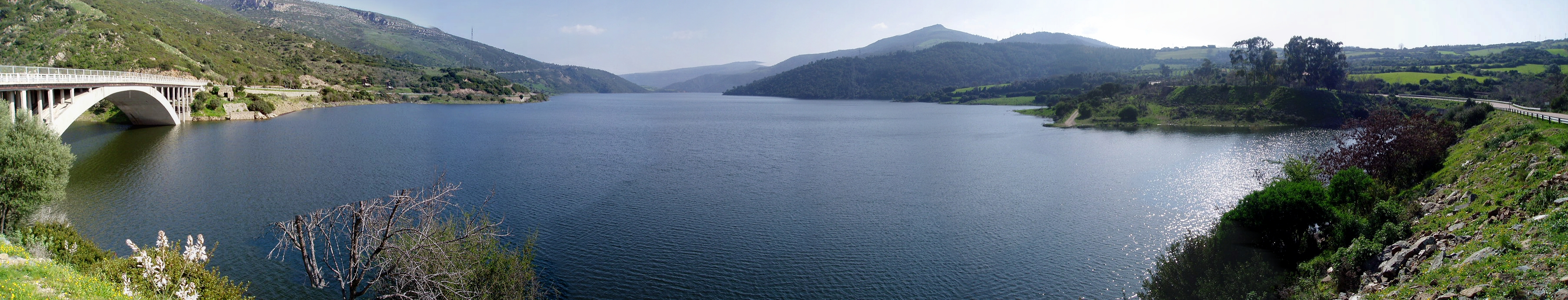
- Lake of Basso Flumendosa

Location
- Country: Italy

Physical characteristics
- Source
  - location: Monte Armidda (Gennargentu massif)
  - elevation: 1,270 m (4,170 ft)
- Mouth: Tyrrhenian Sea
  - location: near Muravera and Villaputzu
  - coordinates: 39.4298°N 9.6291°E
  - elevation: 0 m (0 ft)
- Length: 127 km (79 mi)
- Basin size: 1,775 km^{2} (685 sq mi)

The Flumendosa is a river of southern Sardinia, Italy. With a length of 127 kilometres (79 mi), it is the second longest river of the island behind the Tirso.

The Flumendosa's springs are located in the Gennargentu massif, at the foot of the Monte Armidda; it flows into the Tyrrhenian Sea near the towns of Muravera and Villaputzu. It drains a basin of about 1,775 square kilometres (685 mi^{2}). Before the construction of two large dams, it had a discharge of 22 cubic metres per second (780 cu ft/s).
