= Villaputzu =

Villaputzu Biddeputzi (Campidanese)
- Comune
- Comune di Villaputzu
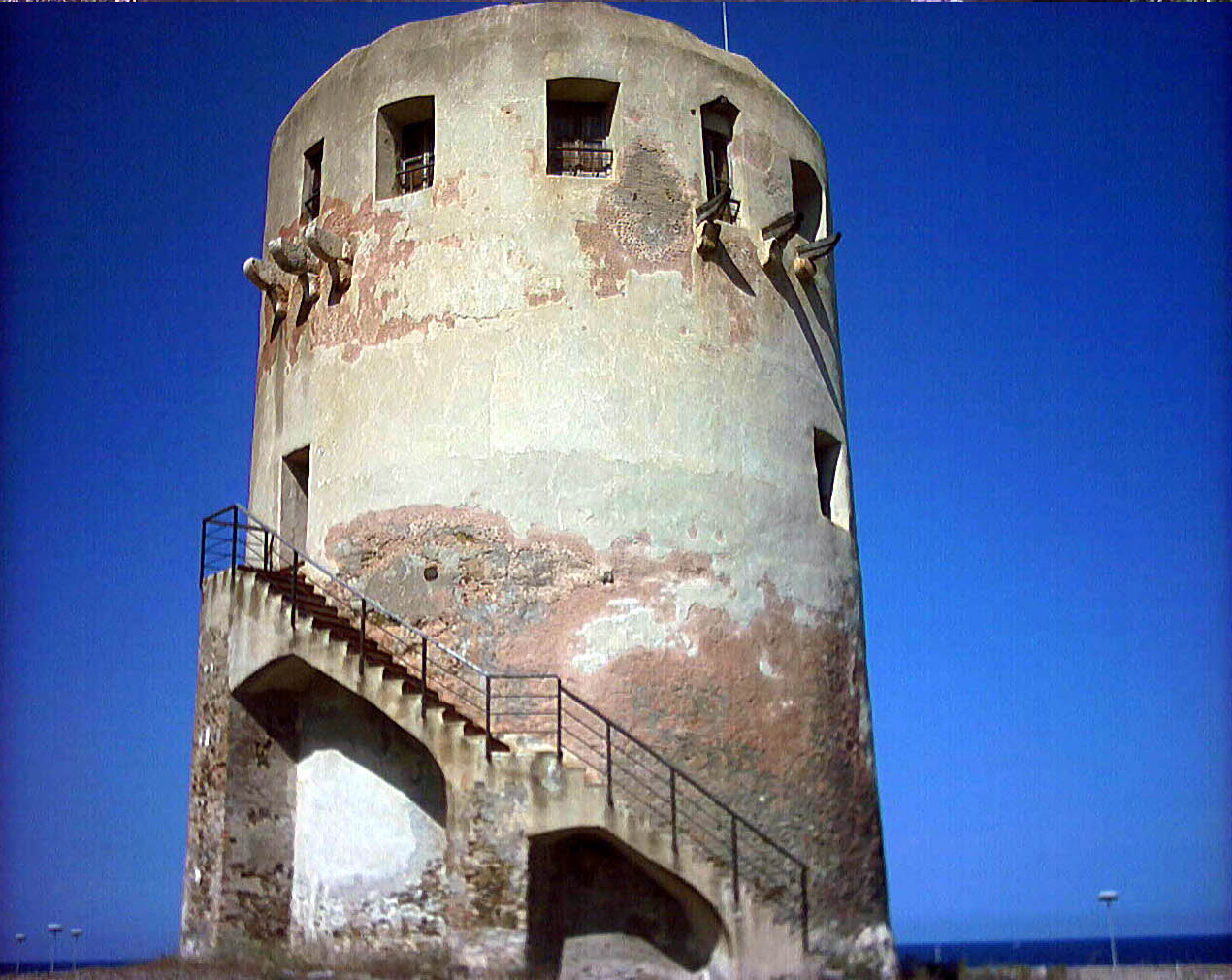
- Torre di Porto Corallo

- Coat of arms

- Location within Sardinia
- Coordinates: 39°26′N 9°35′E
- Country: Italy
- Region: Sardinia
- Metropolitan city: Cagliari (CA)
- Frazioni: Porto Corallo, Porto Tramatzu, Quirra, San Lorenzo, Santa Maria, Cala Murtas

Government
  - Mayor: Sandro Porcu

Area
  - Total: 181.31 km^{2} (70.00 sq mi)
- Elevation: 11 m (36 ft)

Population (31 July 2015)
  - Total: 4,782
  - Density: 26.37/km^{2} (68.31/sq mi)
- Demonym: Villaputzesi
- Time zone: UTC+1 (CET)
  - Summer (DST): UTC+2 (CEST)
- Postal code: 09040
- Dialing code: 070
- Patron saint: St. George
- Website: Official website

Villaputzu (Campidanese: Bidda de Putzi or Biddeputzi) is a municipality in the Metropolitan City of Cagliari in the Italian region and island of Sardinia, located about 45 kilometres (28 mi) northeast of the Sardinian capital Cagliari. It is located in a short plain at the mouth of the Flumendosa river, next to the Sarrabus hill.

The village of Villaputzu is a part of the historic region of Sarrabus, whose municipalities are Villaputzu, Muravera, San Vito and Castiadas.

Villaputzu was the birthplace of launeddas instrumentist Efisio Melis.
