= Siurgus Donigala =

Siurgus Donigala Seurgus Donigala
- Comune
- Comune di Siurgus Donigala
- Coat of arms

- Location within Sardinia
- Coordinates: 39°36′N 9°11′E
- Country: Italy
- Region: Sardinia
- Metropolitan city: Cagliari (CA)

Government
  - Mayor: Danilo Artuzzu

Area
  - Total: 76.45 km^{2} (29.52 sq mi)

Population (2018-01-01)
  - Total: 2,189
  - Density: 28.63/km^{2} (74.16/sq mi)
- Time zone: UTC+1 (CET)
  - Summer (DST): UTC+2 (CEST)
- Postal code: 09040
- Dialing code: 070
- Website: Official website

Siurgus Donigala is a comune (municipality) in the Metropolitan City of Cagliari in the Italian region Sardinia, located about 45 kilometres (28 mi) north of Cagliari.
