= List of municipalities of the Province of South Sardinia =

This is a list of the 107 municipalities (comuni) of the former Province of South Sardinia in the autonomous region of Sardinia in Italy.

== List ==
Municipality	Population (2025)	Area (km^{2})	Density
Arbus	5,586	269.12	20.8
Armungia	399	54.75	7.3
Ballao	715	46.63	15.3
Barrali	1,086	11.23	96.7
Barumini	1,117	26.4	42.3
Buggerru	1,015	48.33	21
Burcei	2,589	94.85	27.3
Calasetta	2,784	31.06	89.6
Carbonia	25,588	145.54	175.8
Carloforte	5,882	51.1	115.1
Castiadas	1,729	103.89	16.6
Collinas	758	20.83	36.4
Decimoputzu	4,184	44.77	93.5
Dolianova	9,336	84.31	110.7
Domus de Maria	1,642	97.14	16.9
Domusnovas	5,732	80.59	71.1
Donori	1,906	35.31	54
Escalaplano	2,035	94.04	21.6
Escolca	543	14.76	36.8
Esterzili	559	100.74	5.5
Fluminimaggiore	2,602	108.18	24.1
Furtei	1,485	26.11	56.9
Genoni	730	43.79	16.7
Genuri	297	7.52	39.5
Gergei	1,093	36.18	30.2
Gesico	714	25.62	27.9
Gesturi	1,134	46.83	24.2
Giba	1,895	30.44	62.3
Goni	435	18.6	23.4
Gonnesa	4,501	48.06	93.7
Gonnosfanadiga	6,031	125.19	48.2
Guamaggiore	882	16.8	52.5
Guasila	2,430	43.51	55.8
Guspini	10,681	174.67	61.1
Iglesias	24,634	208.23	118.3
Isili	2,425	67.84	35.7
Las Plassas	210	11.04	19
Lunamatrona	1,589	20.59	77.2
Mandas	1,945	45.02	43.2
Masainas	1,185	23.69	50
Monastir	4,915	31.79	154.6
Muravera	5,050	93.51	54
Musei	1,505	20.27	74.2
Narcao	2,997	85.88	34.9
Nuragus	811	19.9	40.8
Nurallao	1,100	34.76	31.6
Nuraminis	2,336	45.18	51.7
Nurri	2,019	73.67	27.4
Nuxis	1,397	61.59	22.7
Orroli	1,929	75.59	25.5
Ortacesus	862	23.63	36.5
Pabillonis	2,417	37.42	64.6
Pauli Arbarei	538	15.14	35.5
Perdaxius	1,291	29.5	43.8
Pimentel	1,082	14.97	72.3
Piscinas	759	16.89	44.9
Portoscuso	4,745	38.09	124.6
Sadali	771	49.61	15.5
Samassi	4,710	42.04	112
Samatzai	1,507	31.16	48.4
San Basilio	1,088	44.63	24.4
San Gavino Monreale	7,884	87.4	90.2
San Giovanni Suergiu	5,564	72.37	76.9
San Nicolò Gerrei	722	63.52	11.4
San Sperate	8,548	26.24	325.8
San Vito	3,403	231.64	14.7
Sanluri	8,036	84.23	95.4
Sant'Andrea Frius	1,657	69.22	66.4
Sant'Anna Arresi	2,631	22.97	57.6
Sant'Antioco	10,451	102.29	49.6
Santadi	3,051	81.69	17.5
Sardara	3,740	56.23	66.5
Segariu	1,082	16.69	64.8
Selegas	1,274	20.39	62.5
Senorbì	4,806	34.29	140.2
Serdiana	2,636	55.71	47.3
Serramanna	8,442	83.84	100.7
Serrenti	4,460	42.78	104.3
Serri	600	19.18	31.3
Setzu	129	7.77	16.6
Seui	1,151	148.21	7.8
Seulo	766	58.79	13
Siddi	548	11.02	49.7
Siliqua	3,484	189.85	18.4
Silius	1,004	38.36	26.2
Siurgus Donigala	1,816	76.39	23.8
Soleminis	1,879	12.79	146.9
Suelli	1,051	19.2	54.7
Teulada	3,188	246.19	12.9
Tratalias	983	31	31.7
Tuili	903	24.59	36.7
Turri	372	9.6	38.8
Ussana	3,986	32.82	121.5
Ussaramanna	465	9.76	47.6
Vallermosa	1,795	61.75	29.1
Villacidro	12,988	183.48	70.8
Villamar	2,398	38.53	62.2
Villamassargia	3,293	91.39	36
Villanova Tulo	993	40.45	24.5
Villanovaforru	839	10.93	76.8
Villanovafranca	1,144	27.59	41.5
Villaperuccio	1,017	36.43	27.9
Villaputzu	4,372	181.31	24.1
Villasalto	904	130.36	6.9
Villasimius	3,723	57.97	64.2
Villasor	6,549	86.79	75.5
Villaspeciosa	2,637	27.19	97

== See also ==
- List of municipalities of Italy
