= Province of South Sardinia =

Province of Italy

Coordinates: 39.1500°N 8.5167°E

Province of South Sardinia Provincia del Sud Sardegna (Italian) Provìntzia de Sud Sardigna (Sardinian)
- Province (2016–2025)
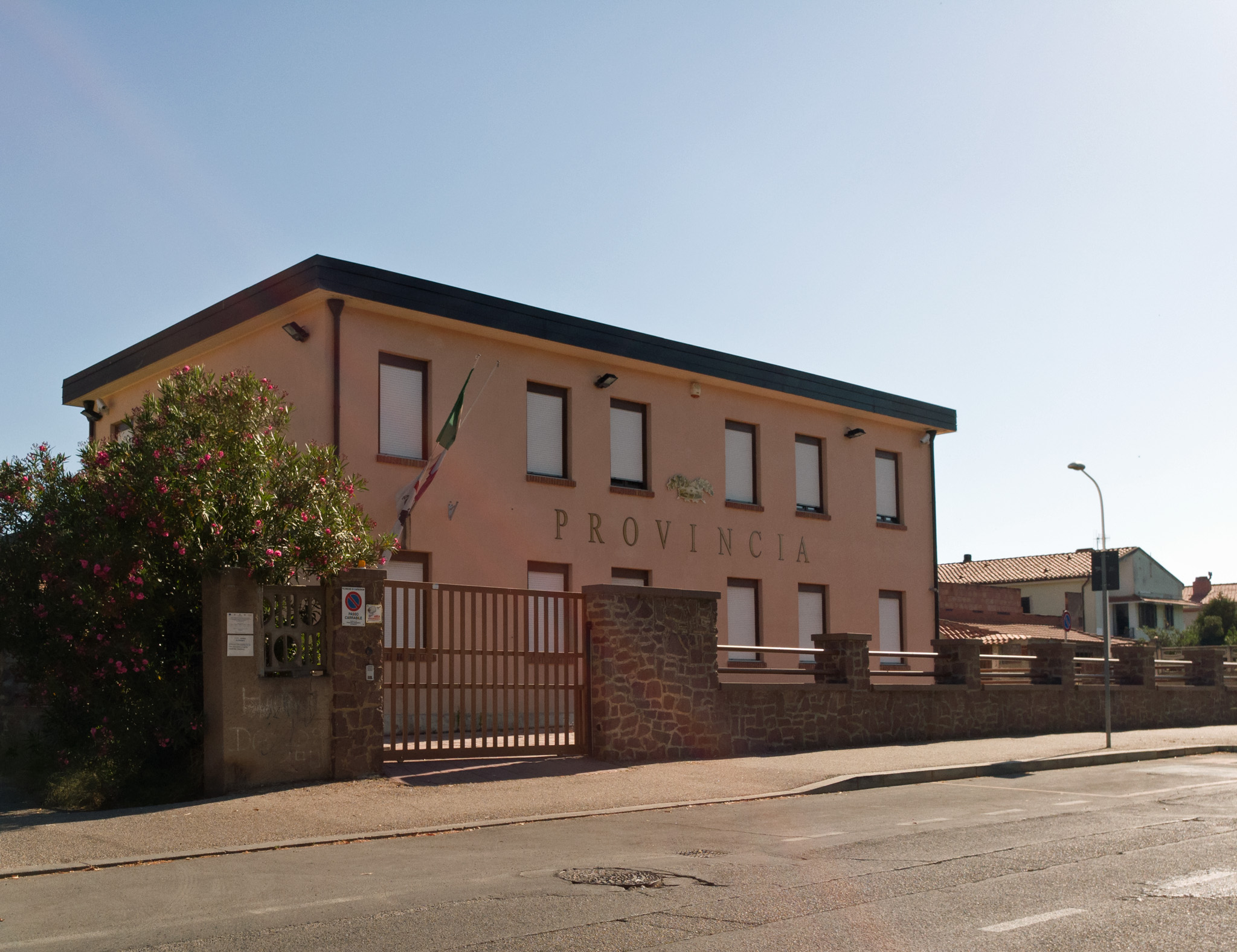
- The provisional seat

- Coat of arms

- Location of the province of South Sardinia in Italy
- Country: Italy
- Region: Sardinia
- Established: 4 February 2016
- Disestablished: 1 June 2025
- Capital(s): Carbonia (provisional)
- Municipalities: 107

Area
  - Total: 6,531 km^{2} (2,522 sq mi)

Population (2025)
  - Total: 329,556
  - Density: 50.46/km^{2} (130.7/sq mi)
- Time zone: UTC+1 (CET)
  - Summer (DST): UTC+2 (CEST)
- Postal code: 09010-09066
- Telephone prefix: 070, 0781, 0782

The province of South Sardinia (Italian: provincia del Sud Sardegna; Sardinian: provìntzia de Sud Sardigna) was a province in the autonomous island region of Sardinia, Italy, instituted on 4 February 2016. It included the disestablished provinces of Carbonia-Iglesias and Medio Campidano, a large part of the old province of Cagliari, and two other municipalities. It was disestablished on 1 June 2025. Before being disestablished, it had a population of 329,556.

== History ==
South Sardinia was instituted as a result of the law reforming provinces in Sardinia (Regional Law 2/2016). Once operational, it will include most of the geographic region of Campidano, the Sarrabus-Gerrei, the Trexenta and the Sulcis-Iglesiente. The provincial capital will be determined by the first provincial council, as well as the institution's statute.

In April 2021, under Sardinian Regional Council's Regional Law Nr. 7, the province was suppressed; the provinces of Carbonia-Iglesias (now bearing the name Sulcis Iglesiente) and Medio Campidano were restored, and the rest of the province would be absorbed into the Metropolitan City of Cagliari, minus the comune of Seulo (absorbed into province of Nuoro). Whilst the Italian government challenged the law, thus stalling its implementation, on March 12, 2022, the Constitutional Court ruled in favor of the Autonomous Region of Sardinia. On April 13, 2023, the regional council, at the proposal of the regional government, approved an amendment to the 2021 reform, defining the timeframe and manner of its implementation, which became effective on 1 June 2025.

== Government ==
=== List of commissioners ===
| | Commissioner | Term start | Term end |
|---|---|---|---|
| 1 | Giorgio Sanna | 4 February 2016 | 1 January 2018 |
| 2 | Mario Mossa | 1 January 2018 | 27 September 2024 |
| 3 | Vincenzo Basciu | 27 September 2024 | 1 June 2025 |

=== Municipalities ===
- From the province of Carbonia-Iglesias (all 23): Buggerru, Calasetta, Carbonia, Carloforte, Domusnovas, Fluminimaggiore, Giba, Gonnesa, Iglesias, Masainas, Musei, Narcao, Nuxis, Perdaxius, Piscinas, Portoscuso, San Giovanni Suergiu, Sant'Anna Arresi, Sant'Antioco, Santadi, Tratalias, Villamassargia, Villaperuccio
- From the province of Medio Campidano (all 28): Arbus, Barumini, Collinas, Furtei, Genuri, Gesturi, Gonnosfanadiga, Guspini, Las Plassas, Lunamatrona, Pabillonis, Pauli Arbarei, Samassi, San Gavino Monreale, Sanluri, Sardara, Segariu, Serramanna, Serrenti, Setzu, Siddi, Tuili, Turri, Ussaramanna, Villacidro, Villamar, Villanovaforru, Villanovafranca
- From the province of Cagliari (54 of 71): Armungia, Ballao, Barrali, Burcei, Castiadas, Decimoputzu, Dolianova, Domus de Maria, Donori, Escalaplano, Escolca, Esterzili, Gergei, Gesico, Goni, Guamaggiore, Guasila, Isili, Mandas, Monastir, Muravera, Nuragus, Nurallao, Nuraminis, Nurri, Orroli, Ortacesus, Pimentel, Sadali, Samatzai, San Basilio, San Nicolò Gerrei, San Sperate, San Vito, Sant'Andrea Frius, Selegas, Senorbì, Serdiana, Serri, Seulo, Siliqua, Silius, Siurgus Donigala, Soleminis, Suelli, Teulada, Ussana, Vallermosa, Villanova Tulo, Villaputzu, Villasalto, Villasimius, Villasor, Villaspeciosa
- From the province of Ogliastra: Seui
- From the province of Oristano: Genoni

== Demographics ==
In 2025, the province had a population of 329,556, of which 49.7% were male and 50.3% were female, compared to the nationwide average of 49.0% and 51.0% respectively. Minors made up 11.6% of the population, and seniors made up 29.6%, compared to the Italian average of 14.9% and 24.7% respectively.

Historical population

| Year | Pop. | ±% |
|---|---|---|
| 1861 | 160,510 | — |
| 1871 | 162,652 | +1.3% |
| 1881 | 176,423 | +8.5% |
| 1901 | 208,245 | +18.0% |
| 1911 | 226,833 | +8.9% |
| 1921 | 228,211 | +0.6% |
| 1931 | 252,758 | +10.8% |
| 1936 | 262,192 | +3.7% |

| Year | Pop. | ±% |
|---|---|---|
| 1951 | 359,476 | +37.1% |
| 1961 | 374,961 | +4.3% |
| 1971 | 359,078 | −4.2% |
| 1981 | 377,993 | +5.3% |
| 1991 | 382,914 | +1.3% |
| 2001 | 368,343 | −3.8% |
| 2011 | 361,945 | −1.7% |
| 2021 | 337,178 | −6.8% |

Source: ISTAT

=== Immigration ===
As of 2025, the foreign-born population is 11,631, making up 3.5% of the total population. The 5 largest foreign nationalities are Germans (1,521), Romanians (1,141), French (863), Moroccans (790) and Swiss (654).
