= List of municipalities of the Metropolitan City of Cagliari =

This is a list of the 70 municipalities (comuni) of the Metropolitan City of Cagliari in the autonomous region of Sardinia in Italy.

== List ==
Municipality	Native name	Population (2026)	Area (km^{2})	Density
Armungia	Armùngia/Armùnja	395	54.75	7.2
Assemini	Assèmini	25,575	118.17	216.4
Ballao	Ballàu	706	46.63	15.1
Barrali	Barràbi	1,087	11.23	96.8
Burcei	Brucèi	2,571	94.85	27.1
Cagliari	Castèddu	145,981	85.01	1,717.2
Capoterra	Cabudèrra	23,015	68.49	336.0
Castiadas	Castiàdas	1,740	103.89	16.7
Decimomannu	Deximumànnu	8,375	27.72	302.1
Decimoputzu	Deximupùtzu	4,165	44.77	93.0
Dolianova	Patiòlla	9,357	84.31	111.0
Domus de Maria	Dòmus de Marìa	1,630	97.14	16.8
Donori	Donòri	1,912	35.31	54.1
Elmas	Su Màsu	9,480	13.63	695.5
Escalaplano	Scaleprànu	2,017	94.04	21.4
Escolca	Iscròca	531	14.76	36.0
Esterzili	Istersìli/Stersìli	536	100.74	5.3
Genoni	Jaròi/Geròni	716	43.79	16.4
Gergei	Gerxèi	1,095	36.18	30.3
Gesico	Gèsigu	698	25.62	27.2
Goni	Gòni	434	18.60	23.3
Guamaggiore	Gomajòri	872	16.80	51.9
Guasila	Guasìba/Guasìlla	2,411	43.51	55.4
Isili	Ìsili	2,429	67.84	35.8
Mandas	Màndas	1,938	45.02	43.0
Maracalagonis	Màra	7,885	101.37	77.8
Monastir	Muristèni	4,884	31.79	153.6
Monserrato	Paùli	18,624	6.43	2,896.4
Muravera	Murèra	4,973	93.51	53.2
Nuragus	Nuràgus	795	19.90	39.9
Nurallao	Nuràdda	1,089	34.76	31.3
Nuraminis	Nuràminis	2,337	45.18	51.7
Nurri	Nurri	1,988	73.67	27.0
Orroli	Arròlli/Arròli	1,909	75.59	25.3
Ortacesus	Ortacèsus	859	23.63	36.4
Pimentel	Pramantèllu	1,078	14.97	72.0
Pula	Pùla	7,048	138.92	50.7
Quartu Sant'Elena	Cuàrtu Sant'Alèni	67,869	96.41	704.0
Quartucciu	Cuattùcciu	12,723	27.93	455.5
Sadali	Sàdili	772	49.61	15.6
Samatzai	Samatzài	1,502	31.16	48.2
San Basilio	Santu 'Asìli 'e mònti	1,067	44.63	23.9
San Nicolò Gerrei	Paùli Gerrèi/Pàùli Xrexèi	709	63.52	11.2
San Sperate	Santu Sparàu	8,625	26.24	328.7
San Vito	Santu Ìdu	3,409	231.64	14.7
Sant'Andrea Frius	Sant'Andrìa 'e Frìus	1,659	36.16	45.9
Sarroch	Sarròccu	4,980	67.83	73.4
Selargius	Ceràxius	28,272	26.67	1,060.1
Selegas	Sèligas	1,253	20.39	61.5
Senorbì	Senorbì	4,810	34.29	140.3
Serdiana	Serdìana	2,643	55.71	47.4
Serri	Sèrri	588	19.18	30.7
Sestu	Sèstu	20,630	48.29	427.2
Settimo San Pietro	Sètimu	6,968	23.29	299.2
Siliqua	Silìcua	3,468	189.85	18.3
Silius	Silìus	987	38.36	25.7
Sinnai	Sìnnia	17,447	223.91	77.9
Siurgus Donigala	Seùrgus Donigàla/Sriùgus Donigàlla	1,820	76.39	23.8
Soleminis	Solèminis	1,902	12.79	148.7
Suelli	Suèddi	1,049	19.20	54.6
Ussana	Ùssana	3,997	32.82	121.8
Uta	Uda	8,899	134.71	66.1
Vallermosa	Biddaramòsa	1,782	61.75	28.9
Villa San Pietro	Santu Pèdru	2,095	39.89	52.5
Villanova Tulo	Biddanòa 'e Tùlu	977	40.45	24.2
Villaputzu	Biddepùtzi	4,364	181.31	24.1
Villasalto	Biddesàtu	876	130.36	6.7
Villasimius	Crabonàxa	3,762	57.97	64.9
Villasor	Bidd'e Sòrris	6,480	86.79	74.7
Villaspeciosa	Biddaspitziòsa	2,700	27.19	99.3

== See also ==
- List of municipalities of Italy
- List of municipalities of Sardinia
