= Strada statale 131 Carlo Felice =

State highway in Italy

State Highway 131
- Strada statale 131

Route information
- Part of E25
- Maintained by ANAS
- Length: 226.0 km (140.4 mi)
- Existed: 1928–present

Major junctions
- From: Porto Torres
- Strada statale 131 Diramazione Centrale Nuorese
- To: Cagliari

Location
- Country: Italy
- Regions: Sardinia
- Major cities: Porto Torres, Sassari, Macomer, Oristano, Cagliari

Highway system
- Roads in Italy; Autostrade; State; Regional; Provincial; Municipal
← SS 130 dir	→ SS 131 bis

The Strada statale 131 (SS 131) is an Italian state highway 226.0 kilometres (140.4 mi) long in Italy. It is the major road in the region of Sardinia. It is a freeway that connects the towns of Porto Torres and Cagliari via Sassari, Macomer and Oristano. It is considered the "spinal cord" of Sardinia. It is a part of the E25 European route.

== History ==
Building works begun in the 19th century, under the Kingdom of Charles Felix of Sardinia, the road followed the route of the ancient Roman road Turris Lybissonis-Caralis.

The infrastructure was modernized under fascism, and in the 1970s was rebuilt, becoming a Superstrada (Dual carriageway), some stretches are classified a second category extra-urban road, and the speed limit is 90 km/h, while other ones are considered first category extra-urban road with higher speed limits (110 km/h).

== Route ==
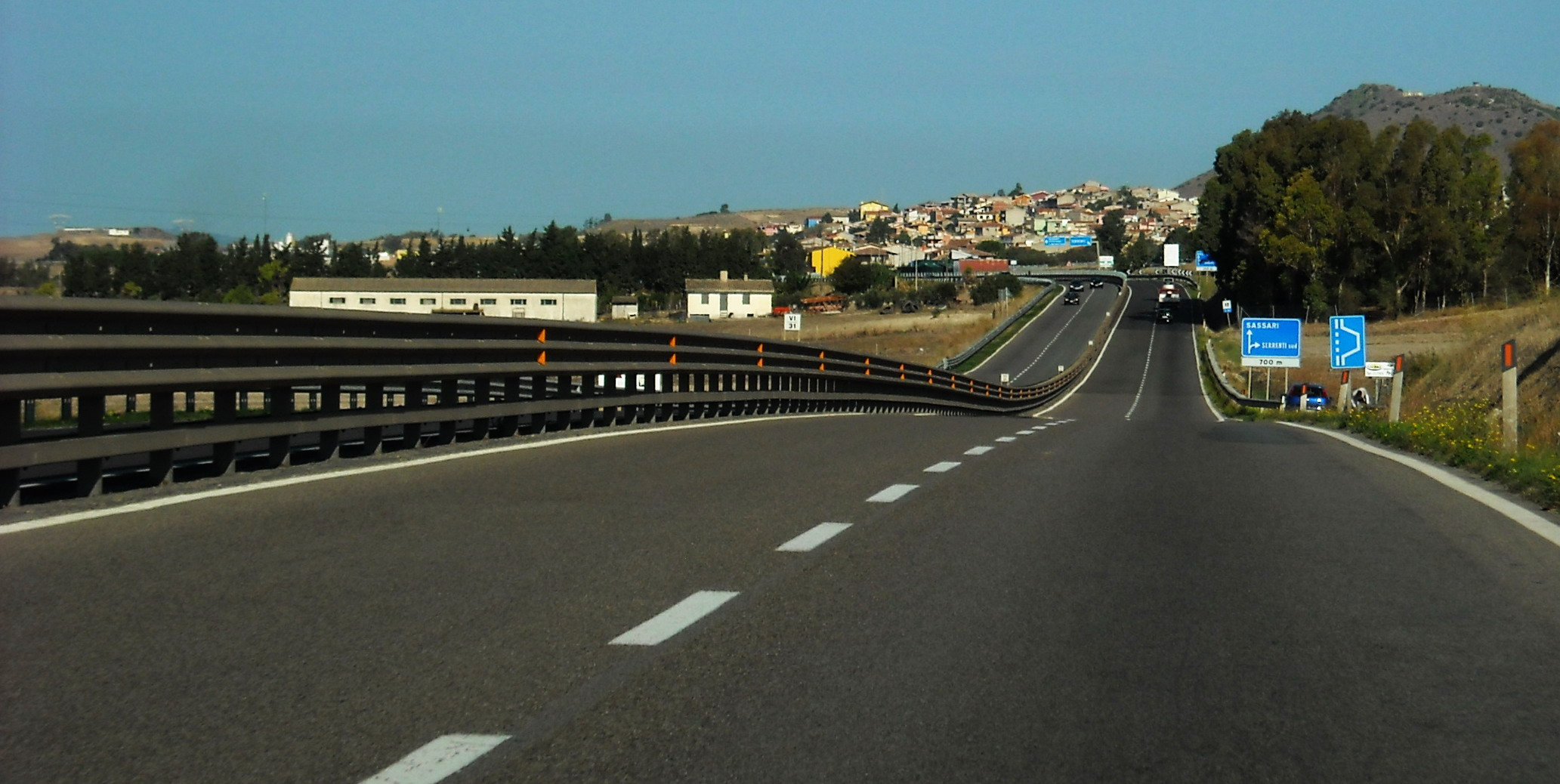
Strada statale 131 Carlo Felice in Serrenti

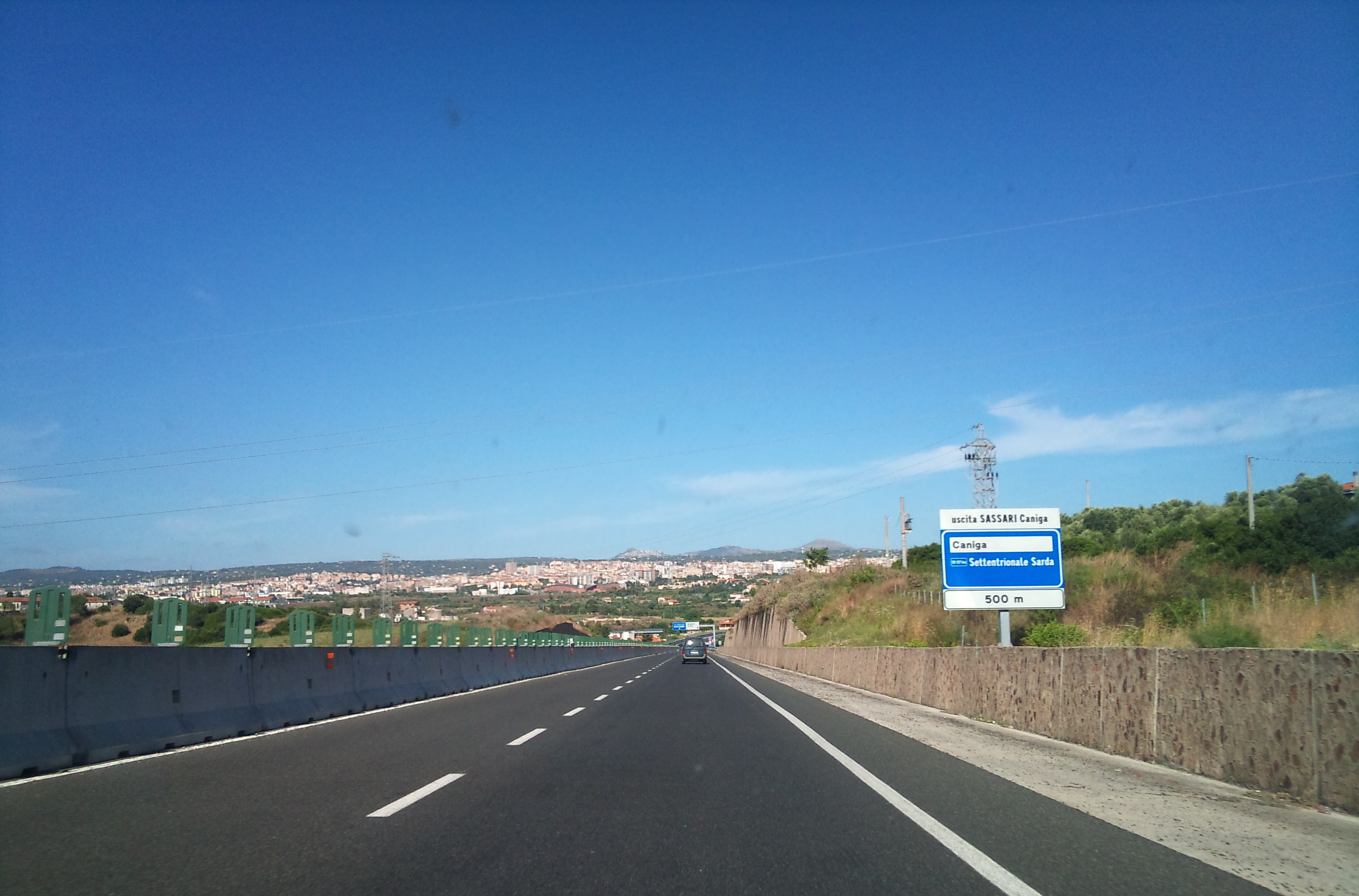
Strada statale 131 Carlo Felice in Sassari

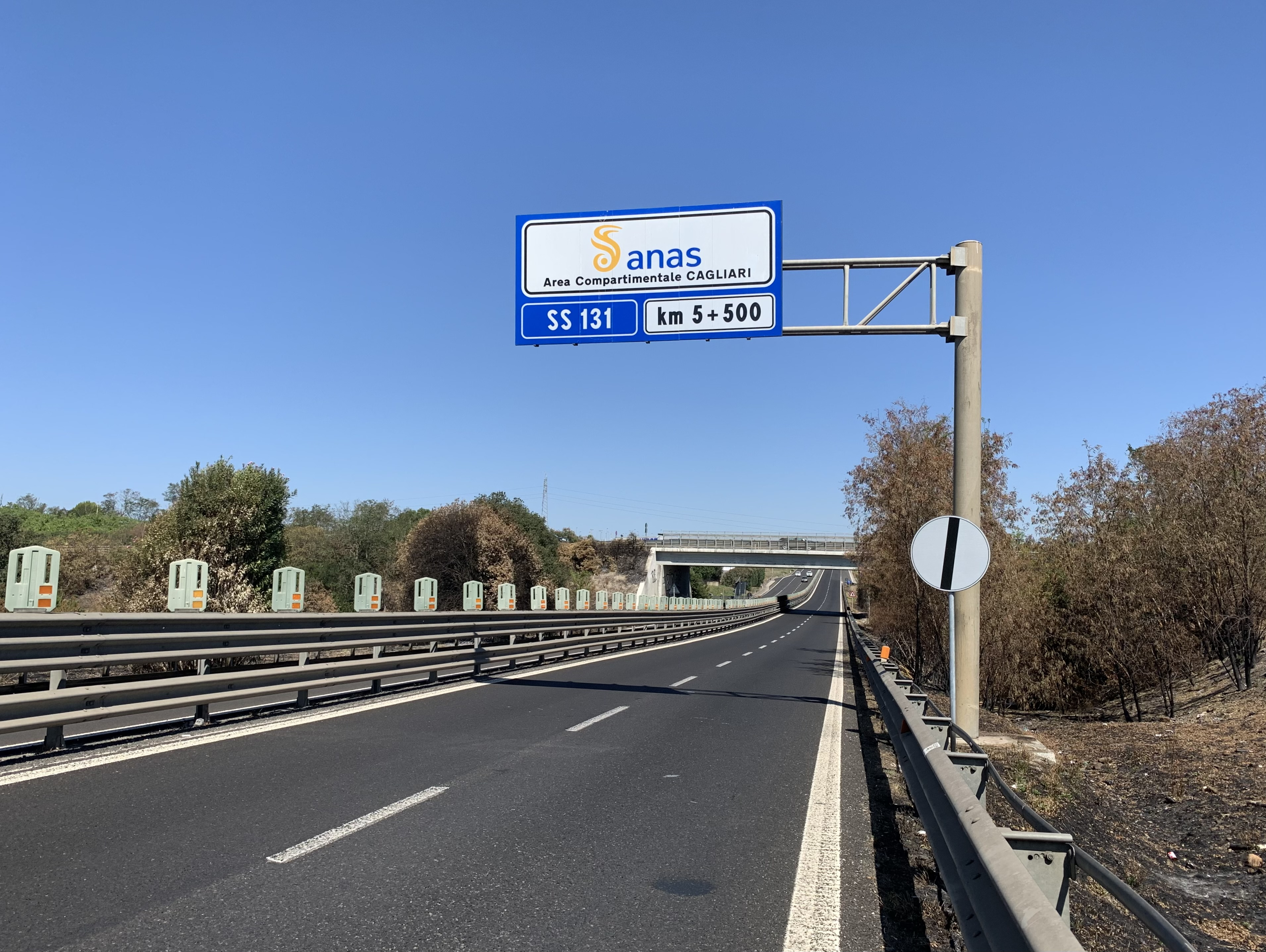
Strada statale 131 Carlo Felice in Cagliari

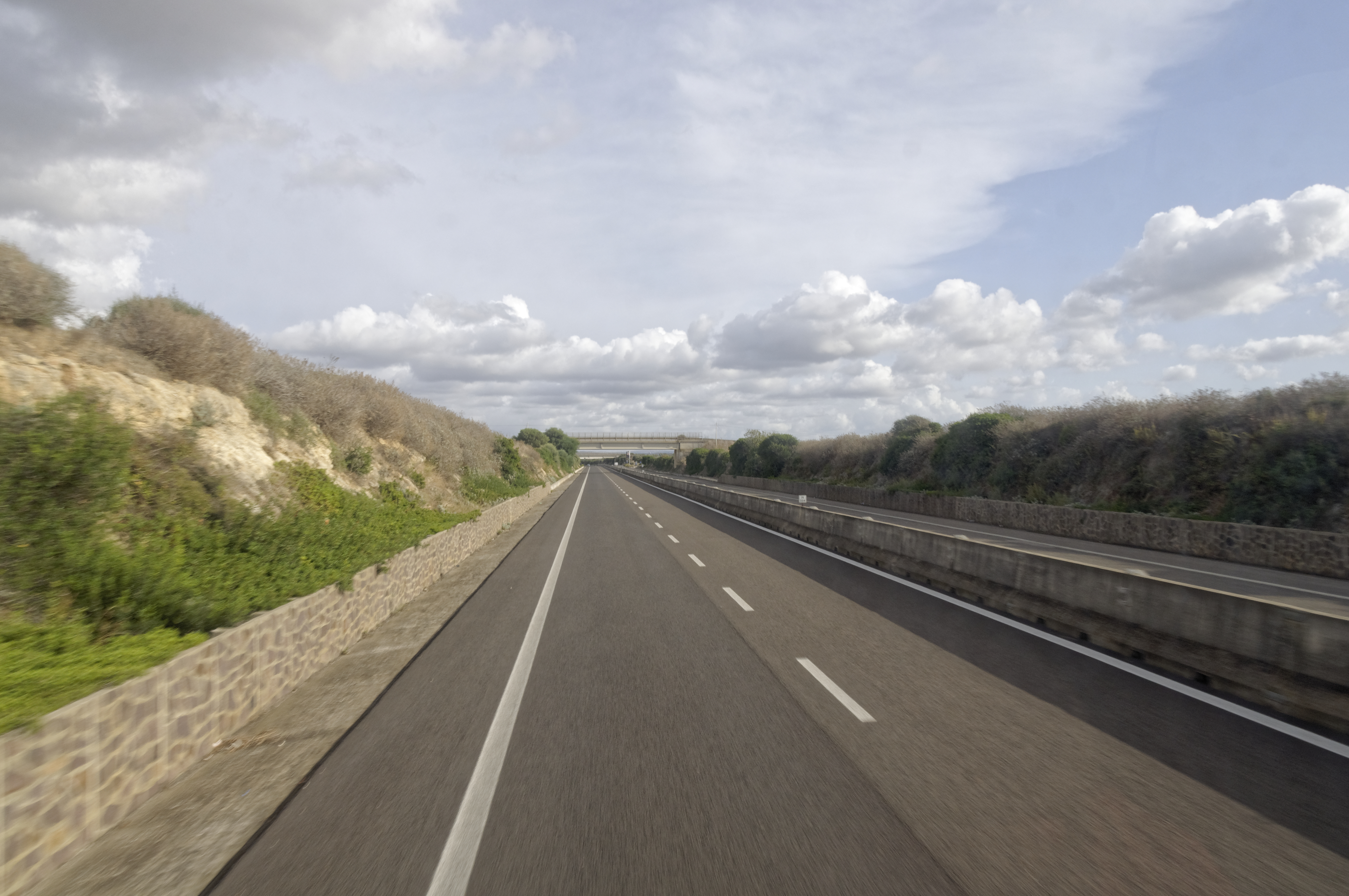
Strada statale 131 Carlo Felice in Porto Torres

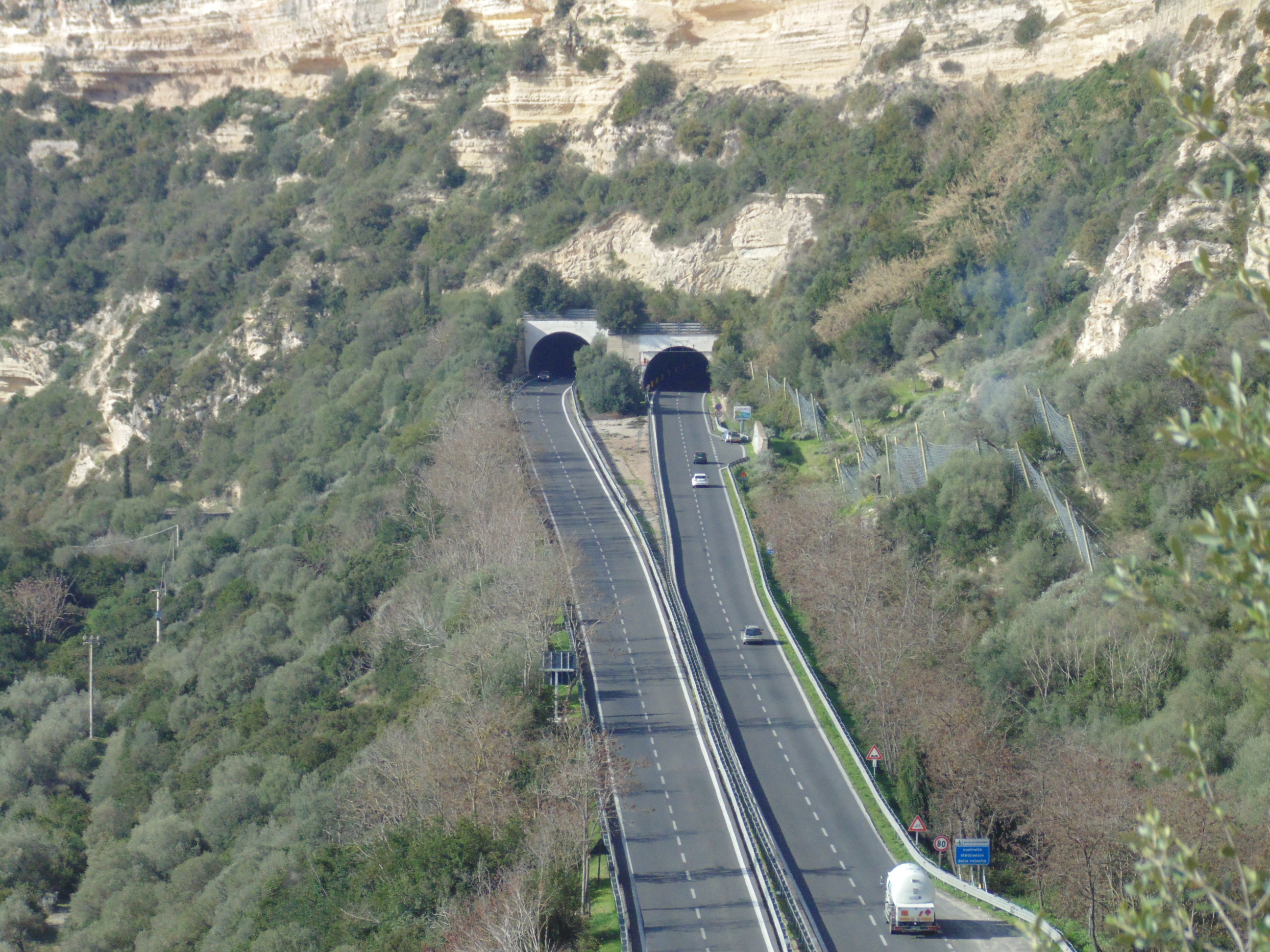
Strada statale 131 Carlo Felice in Sassari

Carlo Felice
Exit	↓km↓	Province
Cagliari (viale Monastir)	5.5 km (3.4 mi)	CA
Carlo Felice; Cagliari - "G. Brotzu" hospital - Quartu Sant'Elena	6.6 km (4.1 mi)	CA
Sestu - Cagliari Elmas Airport	7.7 km (4.8 mi)	CA
Sa Cantonera	10.6 km (6.6 mi)	CA
Sestu - San Sperate - Macchiareddu-Grogastu	11.7 km (7.3 mi)	CA
Assemini	12.8 km (8.0 mi)	CA
San Sperate	14.9 km (9.3 mi)	CA
Monastir - Is Argiddas	18.5 km (11.5 mi)	CA
di Sibiola; Monastir - Ussana - San Sperate - Dolianova - Donori	20.4 km (12.7 mi)	SU
Centrale Sarda; Senorbì - Isili	21.4 km (13.3 mi)	SU
U-turn	22.4 km (13.9 mi)	SU
Nuraminis	26 km (16 mi)	SU
Nuraminis - Serramanna	27.2 km (16.9 mi)	SU
Guasila - Samatzai - Nuraminis	28.5 km (17.7 mi)	SU
Villagreca	30.3 km (18.8 mi)	SU
Serrenti - Samassi	34.3 km (21.3 mi)	SU
Serrenti - Piano Insediamenti Produttivi	35.0 km (21.7 mi)	SU
Villasanta - Furtei	37.4 km (23.2 mi)	SU
Sanluri - Villasanta	41.1 km (25.5 mi)	SU
di Giba - di San Gavino e del Flumini	41.9 km (26.0 mi)	SU
Sanluri; San Gavino Monreale - Guspini - Villacidro	45.4 km (28.2 mi)	SU
Villanovaforru	50.5 km (31.4 mi)	SU
San Gavino Monreale - Sardara	53.0 km (32.9 mi)	SU
Pabillonis - Sardara - Terme di Santa Maria de Is Acquas	54.8 km (34.1 mi)	SU
Gonnostramatza - Ales - Collinas	57.6 km (35.8 mi)	OR
Mogoro - Pabillonis	62.2 km (38.6 mi)	OR
Uras - San Nicolò d'Arcidano - di Laconi e Uras	66.8 km (41.5 mi)	OR
Piano Insediamenti Produttivi - Terralba	72.2 km (44.9 mi)	OR
Sud Occidentale Sarda; Marrubiu - Terralba	76.1 km (47.3 mi)	OR
Arborea - Sant'Anna	81.5 km (50.6 mi)	OR
Monte Arci	83.7 km (52.0 mi)	OR
Oristano Sud - Arborea - Santa Giusta	87.6 km (54.4 mi)	OR
Oristano-Fenosu Airport	92.2 km (57.3 mi)	OR
del Tirso e del Mandrolisai	94.2 km (58.5 mi)	OR
Oristano Nord - Siamaggiore - Zeddiani; Museo archeologico comunale Giovanni Marongiu	98.7 km (61.3 mi)	OR
San Vero Milis - Solarussa - Tramatza - Bonarcado	103.7 km (64.4 mi)	OR
Milis - Bauladu	107.1 km (66.5 mi)	OR
Santuario nuragico di Santa Cristina	114.3 km (71.0 mi)	OR
Paulilatino - Santu Lussurgiu - Bonarcado - Seneghe	118.9 km (73.9 mi)	OR
Paulilatino	120.6 km (74.9 mi)	OR
dir/centr Nuorese; Nuoro - Olbia	123.1 km (76.5 mi)	OR
Santu Lussurgiu - Ghilarza - Abbasanta	125.2 km (77.8 mi)	OR
Abbasanta - Norbello	126.3 km (78.5 mi)	OR
Norbello - Chiesa di Sant'Ignazio da Laconi	127.7 km (79.3 mi)	OR
Borore - Macomer	134.9 km (83.8 mi)	NU
Macomer - Tossilo	137.9 km (85.7 mi)	NU
Trasversale Sarda; Birori - Macomer - Bortigali - Nuoro	142.1 km (88.3 mi)	NU
Trasversale Sarda; Macomer - Bosa	148.5 km (92.3 mi)	NU
Mulargia	148.8 km (92.5 mi)	NU
Campeda railway station	152.0 km (94.4 mi)	NU
Bolotana	155.0 km (96.3 mi)	NU
Bonorva Sud	158.6 km (98.5 mi)	SS
Bonorva	161.7 km (100.5 mi)	SS
Nord Occidentale Sarda; Cossoine - Pozzomaggiore - Padria - Mara - Suni - Bosa	165.7 km (103.0 mi)	SS
Giave - Romana	168.3 km (104.6 mi)	SS
Carlo Felice; Torralba - Thiesi - Cheremule - Bessude - Ittiri - Bono; Chiesa di San Pietro di Sorres	173.5 km (107.8 mi)	SS
Centrale Sarda; Mores - Ardara - Ittireddu - Ozieri	178.9 km (111.2 mi)	SS
Ardara - Bessude - Banari - Siligo	186.4 km (115.8 mi)	SS
U-turn	190.3 km (118.2 mi)	SS
Sassari-Olbia; Olbia - Tempio Pausania - Ozieri	192.5 km (119.6 mi)	SS
Ploaghe - Florinas - Codrongianos	193.7 km (120.4 mi)	SS
del Logudoro	197.5 km (122.7 mi)	SS
Cargeghe - Muros	200.9 km (124.8 mi)	SS
Sassari Serra Secca - Ossi - Tissi	204.8 km (127.3 mi)	SS
Sassari viale Italia	208.6 km (129.6 mi)	SS
Sassari-Porto Torres; Sassari - Ittiri - Predda Niedda	209.4 km (130.1 mi)	SS
Sassari Caniga	211.9 km (131.7 mi)	SS
della Nurra; Alghero	216.5 km (134.5 mi)	SS
Truncu Reale	222.0 km (137.9 mi)	SS
dei Due Mari; Stintino - Alghero	229.1 km (142.4 mi)	SS
Porto Torres (via dell'Industria)	231.5 km (143.8 mi)	SS

== See also ==
- State highways (Italy)
- Roads in Italy
- Transport in Italy

=== Other Italian roads ===
- Autostrade of Italy
- Regional road (Italy)
- Provincial road (Italy)
- Municipal road (Italy)
