= Province of Cagliari =

Former province of Sardinia, Italy

Coordinates: 39.2192°N 9.11722°E

- Province (1859–2016)
- Flag Coat of arms

- Map highlighting the location of the province of Cagliari in Italy
- Country: Italy
- Region: Sardinia
- Capital(s): Cagliari
- Comuni: 71

Area
  - Total: 4,570 km^{2} (1,760 sq mi)

Population (2001)
  - Total: 551,053
  - Density: 121/km^{2} (312/sq mi)
- Time zone: UTC+1 (CET)
  - Summer (DST): UTC+2 (CEST)
- Postal code: 09010-09033, 09035-09049, 09090, 09100
- Telephone prefix: 070, 0781, 0783
- Vehicle registration: CA
- ISTAT: 092

The province of Cagliari (Italian: provincia di Cagliari; Sardinian: provìntzia de Casteddu) was a province in the autonomous island region of Sardinia, Italy. Its capital city was Cagliari.

It had an area of 4,470 square kilometres (1,730 mi^{2}), and a total population of 543,310 (2001). There were 71 comuni (sing.: comune) in the province .

The historical province was suppressed by the 2016 Regional Decree Province of Cagliari and replaced by the Metropolitan City of Cagliari and by the province of South Sardinia. However, with the disestablishment of South Sardinia and the formation of the provinces of Sulcis Iglesiente and Medio Campidano, the Metropolitan City was effectively restored to the borders of the old Province.

== Geography ==
The valley of Piscinamanna is in the province.

== Major comuni ==
As of June 30, 2005, the major comuni (municipalities) by population was:

Comune	Population
Cagliari	160,886
Quartu Sant'Elena	70,020
Selargius	28,682
Assemini	25,531
Capoterra	22,620
Monserrato	20,809
Sestu	17,413
Sinnai	16,043
Quartucciu	11,503
Elmas	8,533
Dolianova	8,280
Decimomannu	7,079
San Sperate	7,037
Villasor	7,022
Maracalagonis	7,000
Pula	6,959
Uta	6,928
Settimo San Pietro	6,098
Sarroch	5,275

== Government ==
=== Provincial elections ===
The Democratic Party (Italian: Partito Democratico, PD) is a social-democratic political party in Italy, with The People of Freedom (Italian: Il Popolo della Libertà, PdL), it is one of the two major parties of the current Italian party system.

Cagliari Provincial Election Results June 2010
Name	Party	1st Preference Votes	%	2nd Preference Votes	%
Graziano Milia	PD	71.969	33,8	61.785	52,4
Giuseppe Farris	PdL	99.053	46,5	56.074	47,6
