= Holy Martyr =

Holy Martyr is an Italian epic metal band. They have released four studio albums, all on Dragonheart Records.

The band was founded in Sestu as Hell Forge in 1994, changing its name to Holy Martyr in 1997. By the early 2000s, Ivano Spiga was the only remaining original member. The band wrote a considerable amount of material about Classical Greece, but on Invincible several songs were Japan- and samurai-themed.

== Discography ==
- Hatred and Warlust (demo, 2002)
- Hail to Hellas (EP, 2003)
- Vis et Honor (EP, 2005)
- Still at War (2007)
- Hellenic Warrior Spirit (2008)
- Invincible (2011)
- Darkness Shall Prevail (2017)
