= Antioco Piseddu =

Italian Roman Catholic bishop (1936–2025)

His Excellency Antioco Piseddu
- Bishop Emeritus of Lanusei
- Archdiocese: Cagliari
- Diocese: Lanusei
- Appointed: 29 September 1981
- Term ended: 31 January 2014
- Predecessor: Salvatore Delogu
- Successor: Antonio Mura

Orders
- Ordination: 29 June 1960 by Paolo Botto
- Consecration: 8 November 1981 by Sebastiano Baggio

Personal details
- Born: 16 September 1936 Senorbì, Italy
- Died: 8 June 2025 (aged 88) Cagliari, Italy
- Motto: In simplicate cordis
- Coat of arms

Styles of Antioco Piseddu
- Reference style: His Excellency; The Most Reverend
- Spoken style: Your Excellency
- Religious style: Bishop

Antioco Piseddu (17 September 1936 – 8 June 2025) was an Italian Roman Catholic bishop.

== Biography ==
Piseddu was born in Senorbì on 17 September 1936, and was ordained a priest by Archbishop Paolo Botto for the archdiocese of Cagliari on 29 June 1960.

He was one of the bishops who celebrated the Tridentine Mass after the liturgical reform: on Sunday, 13 September 2021, a prelatic Mass and Sunday, 20 June 2021, a pontifical Mass at the faldistorium, both preceded by the administration of the sacrament of confirmation, in the personal parish of Santa Croce in Cagliari.

Piseddu died after a short illness in Cagliari, on 8 June 2025, at the age of 88.

Catholic Church titles
Preceded by Salvatore Delogu	Bishop of Lanusei; 1981–2014	Succeeded by Antonio Mura
