= Senorbì =

- Comune
- Comune di Senorbì
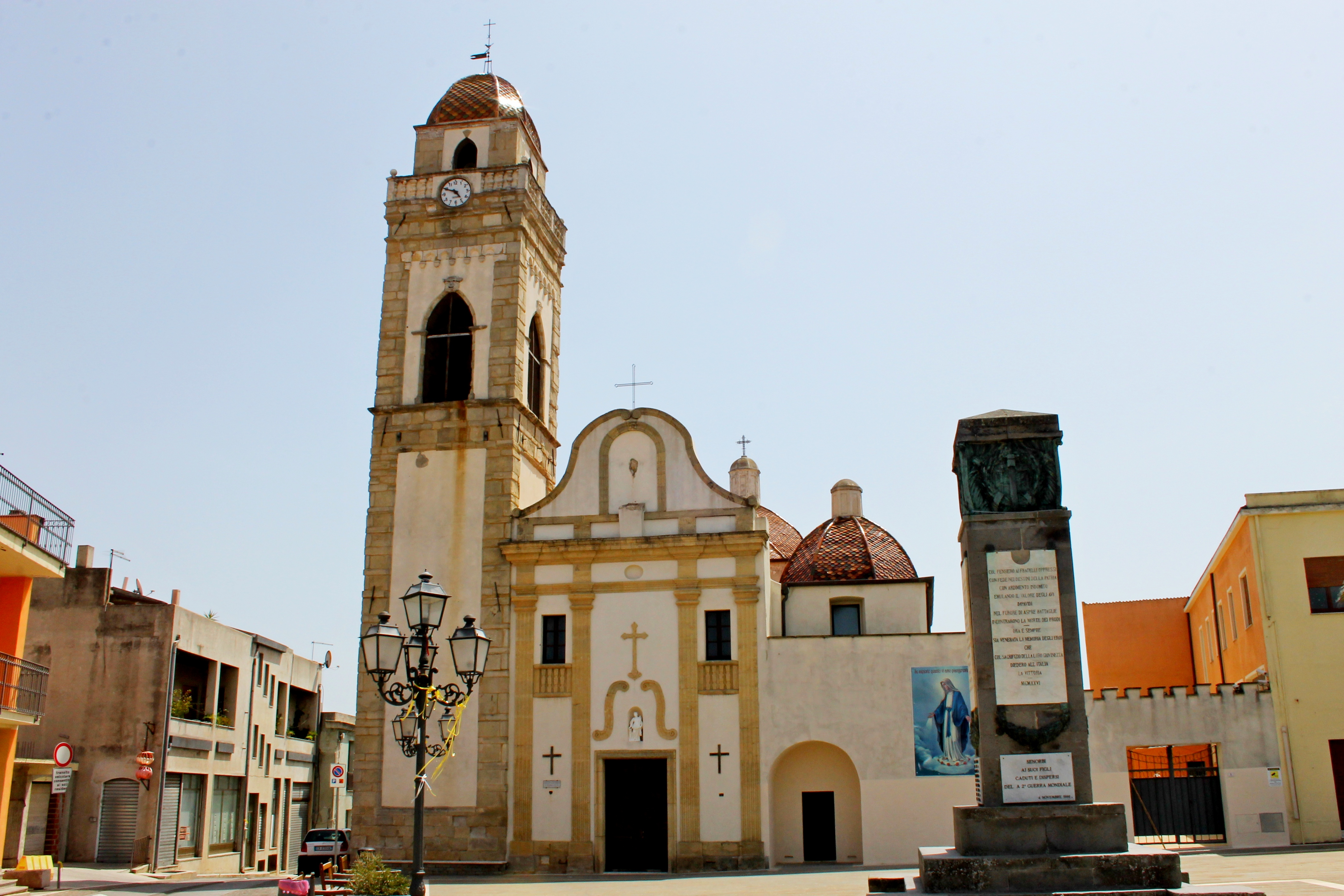

- Coat of arms

- Location within Sardinia
- Coordinates: 39°32′N 9°8′E
- Country: Italy
- Region: Sardinia
- Metropolitan city: Cagliari (CA)
- Frazioni: Arixi and Sisini

Government
  - Mayor: Alessandro Pireddu

Area
  - Total: 34.4 km^{2} (13.3 sq mi)
- Elevation: 204 m (669 ft)

Population (30 November 2011)
  - Total: 16,798
  - Density: 488/km^{2} (1,260/sq mi)
- Demonym: Senorbiesi
- Time zone: UTC+1 (CET)
  - Summer (DST): UTC+2 (CEST)
- Postal code: 09040;
- Dialing code: 070
- Website: Official website

Senorbì is a comune (municipality) in the Province of Cagliari in the Italian region Sardinia, located about 35 kilometres (22 mi) north of Cagliari. It is the main center of Trexenta, located in an area traditionally devoted to the cultivation of cereals. The town houses an archaeological museum (Sa Domu Nosta museum) with findings, dating from the Ozieri culture to the Nuragic civilization, to the 14th century AD.

Senorbì borders the following municipalities: Ortacesus, San Basilio, Sant'Andrea Frius, Selegas, Siurgus Donigala, Suelli.

== Notable people ==
- Antioco Piseddu (1936–2025), Roman catholic bishop.
