= Serramanna =

- Comune
- Comune di Serramanna
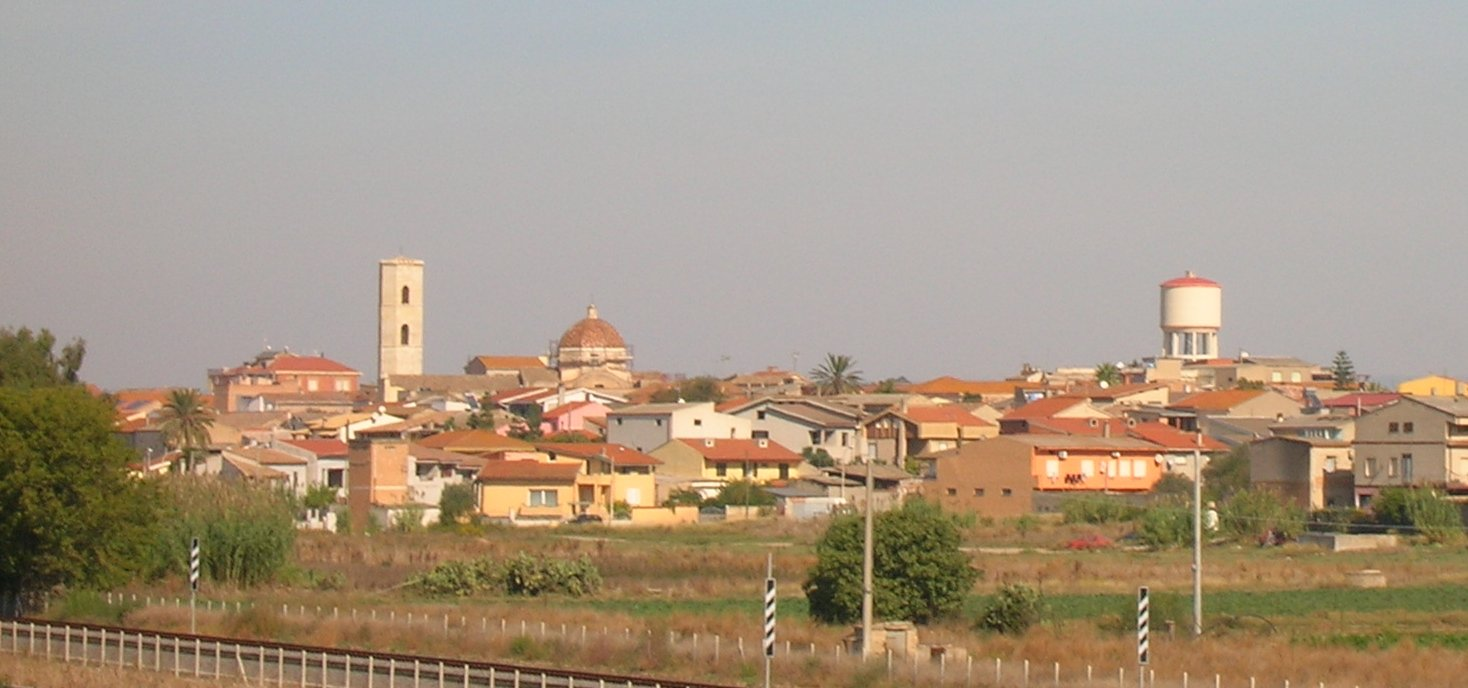
- View of Serramanna

- Location within Sardinia
- Coordinates: 39°26′N 8°55′E
- Country: Italy
- Region: Sardinia
- Province: Medio Campidano

Government
  - Mayor: Gabriele Littera

Area
  - Total: 83.84 km^{2} (32.37 sq mi)
- Elevation: 38 m (125 ft)

Population (2026)
  - Total: 8,388
  - Density: 100.0/km^{2} (259.1/sq mi)
- Demonym: Serramannesi
- Time zone: UTC+1 (CET)
  - Summer (DST): UTC+2 (CEST)
- Postal code: 09038
- Dialing code: 070
- Patron saint: San Leonardo
- Saint day: 6 November
- Website: Official website

Serramanna is a town and comune (municipality) in the Province of Medio Campidano in the autonomous island region of Sardinia in Italy, located about 30 kilometres (19 mi) northwest of Cagliari and about 15 kilometres (9 mi) south of Sanluri. It has 8,388 inhabitants.

Serramanna borders the municipalities of Nuraminis, Samassi, Sanluri, Serrenti, Villacidro, and Villasor.

== Demographics ==
As of 2026, the population is 8,388, of which 49.5% are male, and 50.5% are female. Minors make up 11.5% of the population, and seniors make up 28.7%.

Historical population

Year	Pop.	±%
1861	3,047	—
1871	2,791	−8.4%
1881	3,027	+8.5%
1901	3,672	+21.3%
1911	4,303	+17.2%
1921	4,524	+5.1%
1931	5,233	+15.7%
1936	5,408	+3.3%

Year	Pop.	±%
1951	6,556	+21.2%
1961	7,701	+17.5%
1971	8,578	+11.4%
1981	9,446	+10.1%
1991	9,837	+4.1%
2001	9,545	−3.0%
2011	9,259	−3.0%
2021	8,640	−6.7%

Source: ISTAT

=== Immigration ===
As of 2025, immigrants make up 3.4% of the population. The 5 largest foreign countries of birth are Romania, Morocco, Germany, Switzerland, and China.
