= Ortacesus =

- Comune
- Comune di Ortacesus
- Coat of arms

- Location within Sardinia
- Coordinates: 39°32′N 9°5′E
- Country: Italy
- Region: Sardinia
- Metropolitan city: Cagliari (CA)

Government
  - Mayor: Fabrizio Mereu

Area
  - Total: 23.6 km^{2} (9.1 sq mi)
- Elevation: 161 m (528 ft)

Population (31 December 2017)
  - Total: 917
  - Density: 38.9/km^{2} (101/sq mi)
- Demonym: Ortacesini
- Time zone: UTC+1 (CET)
  - Summer (DST): UTC+2 (CEST)
- Postal code: 09040
- Dialing code: 070
- Website: Official website

Ortacesus is a comune (municipality) in the Metropolitan City of Cagliari in the Italian region Sardinia, located about 35 kilometres (22 mi) north of Cagliari, included in the Trexenta traditional subregion.

Ortacesus borders the following municipalities: Barrali, Guamaggiore, Guasila, Pimentel, Sant'Andrea Frius, Selegas, Senorbì.
