= Serrenti =

- Comune
- Comune di Serrenti
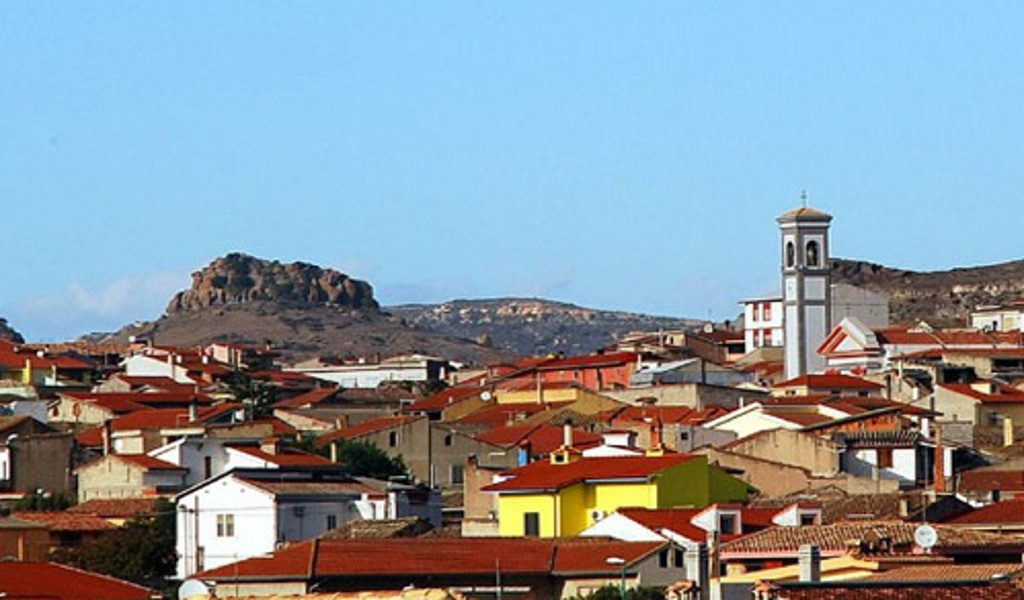
- View of Serrenti

- Location within Sardinia
- Coordinates: 39°30′N 8°58′E
- Country: Italy
- Region: Sardinia
- Province: Medio Campidano

Area
  - Total: 42.78 km^{2} (16.52 sq mi)

Population (2026)
  - Total: 4,425
  - Density: 103.4/km^{2} (267.9/sq mi)
- Demonym: Serrentesi
- Time zone: UTC+1 (CET)
  - Summer (DST): UTC+2 (CEST)
- Postal code: 09027
- Dialing code: 070915
- Website: Official website

Serrenti is a town and comune (municipality) in the Province of Medio Campidano in the autonomous island region of Sardinia in Italy, located about 35 kilometres (22 mi) northwest of Cagliari and about 9 kilometres (6 mi) southeast of Sanluri. It has 4,425 inhabitants.

Serrenti borders the municipalities of Furtei, Guasila, Nuraminis, Samassi, Samatzai, Sanluri, and Serramanna.

== History ==
The area has been inhabited since the Nuragic period, as evidenced by the presence of numerous nuraghi within the territory. Notable examples include Bruncu Su Castiu, located at the edge of the State Road S.S. 131, as well as Monti Mannu, Genna Serrenti, and Cuccuru Turri, situated on the hills to the north of the town.

Near the current settlement, the ruins of ancient Roman villages can be found in the localities of Gutturrosa, Sa Conca Manna, and Santus Angius.

During the Middle Ages, the village was part of the Giudicato of Cagliari and belonged to the Curatoria of Nuraminis. Following the fall of the Giudicato in 1258, it came under Pisan rule and, around 1355, passed to the Aragonese. Under Aragonese and later Spanish dominion, the village shared the historical fate of the other settlements within the former Curatoria. In 1519, when Ludovico Bellit was granted the title of Baron of Monastir, the village was annexed to the barony. Subsequently (in 1355), it was granted as a fief by Peter IV of Aragon, known as "the Ceremonious," to Francesco di Valguarnera. After the extinction of the Valguarnera lineage in 1436, the village passed under the control of various feudal families.

In 1736, during the Savoyard period, the village came under the rule of the Simon and Ricca di Castelvecchio families. It remained under feudal control until 1839, when the feudal system was abolished in the Kingdom of Sardinia. From that time, it became an autonomous municipality governed by a mayor and a municipal council.

== Demographics ==
As of 2026, the population is 4,425, of which 50.5% are male, and 49.5% are female. Minors make up 12.0% of the population, and seniors make up 30.8%.

Historical population

Year	Pop.	±%
1861	2,294	—
1871	2,124	−7.4%
1881	2,257	+6.3%
1901	2,452	+8.6%
1911	2,736	+11.6%
1921	2,814	+2.9%
1931	3,335	+18.5%
1936	3,526	+5.7%

Year	Pop.	±%
1951	4,401	+24.8%
1961	4,559	+3.6%
1971	4,674	+2.5%
1981	5,149	+10.2%
1991	5,327	+3.5%
2001	5,174	−2.9%
2011	5,028	−2.8%
2021	4,581	−8.9%

Source: ISTAT

=== Languages and Dialects ===
The variety of Sardinian spoken in Serrenti is Western Campidanese.

=== Immigration ===
As of 2025, immigrants make up 1.7% of the population. The 5 largest foreign countries of birth are Romania, Switzerland, Germany, Brazil, and Kyrgyzstan.

== Culture ==
Serrenti hosts numerous cultural centers. The Municipal Theatre (Teatro Comunale), inaugurated in 2006, represents one of the most significant cultural institutions in the area, thanks to its wide range of cultural initiatives.

In addition to these institutions, Casa Corda, Ex-Ma, the Youth Multi-purpose Center (Centro Polivalente Giovanile), and the Municipal Library (Biblioteca Comunale) regularly host events and cultural exhibitions.

=== Religious Festivities ===
Every first Monday of October, the feast of Santa Vitalia (in Sardinian, Santa Vida) is celebrated. On March 6, 2017, by Archiepiscopal Decree No. CD-2017-10, Santa Vitalia was declared co-patroness of the parish of the Blessed Virgin Mary of the Immaculate Conception (Beata Vergine Immacolata) in Serrenti. In 2020, the 1900th anniversary of the martyrdom of the saint, which occurred on November 14 in the year 120 AD, was commemorated.

On July 25 and 26, the feast of Saint James (San Giacomo) and Saint Anne (Sant'Anna) is celebrated at the Church of Saint James, located in the district of the same name.

=== Other Events ===
Every year in Serrenti, on a date that varies between late April and early May, the Sagra dell’Asparago e de su Pistocheddu de capa takes place. This festival is dedicated to asparagus as well as to local agri-food and artisanal products. The event highlights asparagus, one of the municipality’s most significant agricultural products, which is widely used in local cuisine, from first courses to desserts.

Asparagus has been consumed in Sardinia since ancient times and has found particularly favorable soil and climatic conditions in the Medio Campidano area. Among the dishes traditionally prepared with asparagus are eggs stuffed with asparagus cream; asparagus wrapped in pancetta, baked with breadcrumbs and Parmigiano Reggiano; and, as a dessert, asparagus cake.

The festival also promotes another typical product of Serrenti: Pistoccheddu de capa, small, hard, and crunchy biscuits with a golden color, covered in white icing and decorated with gold or silver accents. Skilled Sardinian women traditionally shape these biscuits into forms representing domestic animals, such as little sheep, ducks, rabbits, or birds.

== Economy ==
The local economy is predominantly based on agriculture. Traditional crops include durum wheat, tomatoes, and artichokes. More recently, thanks to the initiatives of several cooperatives, the cultivation of asparagus has been successfully introduced.

Agricultural activity has also supported the development of related sectors, such as transportation—facilitated by the proximity to State Road 131 (Carlo Felice)—and the processing of agricultural products.

Another significant sector is stone processing. Serrenti is home to quarries of high-quality trachyte, which has been used in the construction of notable works, including the Palace of Justice (Palazzo di Giustizia), the "Old" Market (Mercato Vecchio), and the façade of the San Michele Cemetery (Cimitero di San Michele) in Cagliari.

== Transport ==
=== Roads ===
Serrenti is served by Sardinia's main road, the Strada Statale 131 Carlo Felice, which runs to the west of the town. Additional connections to neighboring municipalities are provided by Provincial Road 56 (Strada Provinciale 56) and other minor roads.

=== Railways ===
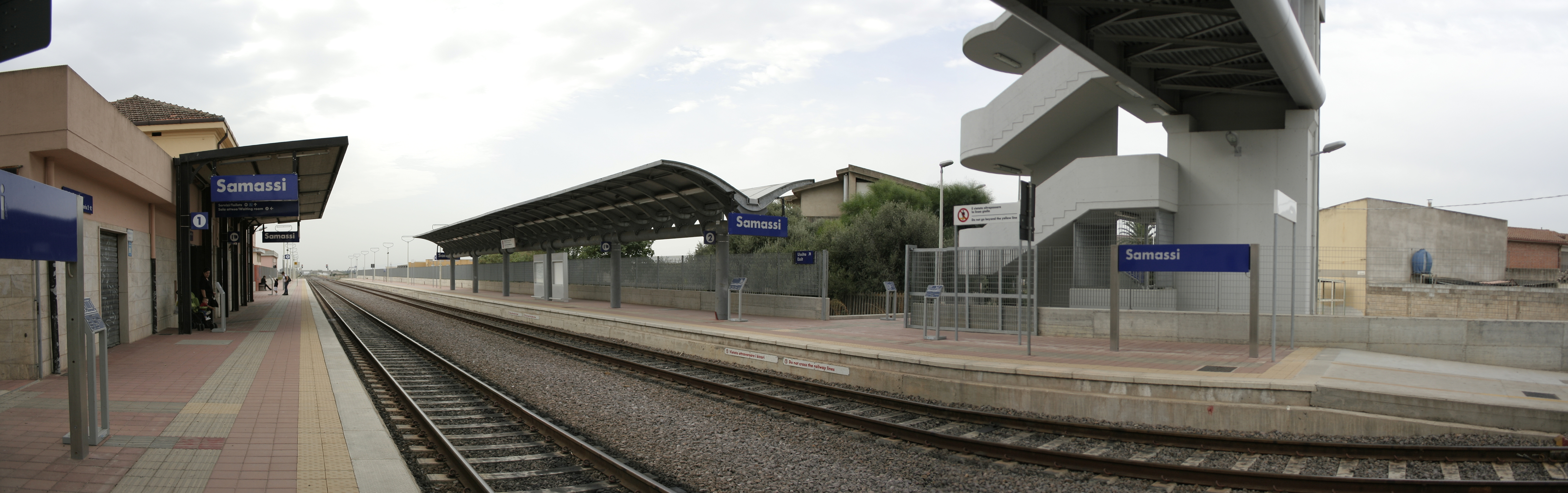
Samassi-Serrenti train station

The municipality gives its name to the Samassi-Serrenti railway station, located in the nearby town of Samassi along the Sardinian Main Line (Dorsale Sarda). The station is served by Trenitalia regional trains.
