= Sant'Andrea Frius =

Sant'Andrea Frius Sant'Andria ‘e Frius
- Comune
- Comune di Sant'Andrea Frius
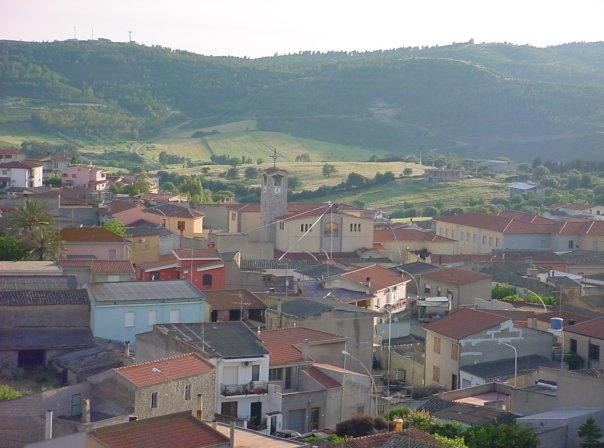

- Coat of arms

- Location within Sardinia
- Coordinates: 39°29′N 9°10′E
- Country: Italy
- Region: Sardinia
- Metropolitan city: Cagliari (CA)

Government
  - Mayor: Giuseppe Cappai

Area
  - Total: 36.16 km^{2} (13.96 sq mi)
- Elevation: 280 m (920 ft)

Population (30 November 2015)
  - Total: 1,808
  - Density: 50.00/km^{2} (129.5/sq mi)
- Demonym: Santandriesi
- Time zone: UTC+1 (CET)
  - Summer (DST): UTC+2 (CEST)
- Postal code: 09040
- Dialing code: 070
- Website: Official website

Sant'Andrea Frius (Sardinian: Sant'Andria 'e Frius) is a comune (municipality) in the Metropolitan City of Cagliari in the Italian region Sardinia, located about 30 kilometres (19 mi) north of Cagliari.

Sant'Andrea Frius borders the following municipalities: Barrali, Dolianova, Donorì, Ortacesus, San Basilio, San Nicolò Gerrei, Senorbì, Serdiana.

== History ==
The area of Sant'Andrea has been inhabited since prehistoric times, as testified by the presence of several nuraghi and other findings. The settlement originated as a Phoenician stronghold, later conquered by the Romans, who had several villas here. In the Middle Ages it was part of the curatoria (shire) of Trexenta within the Giudicato of Cagliari and, subsequently, was owned by the counts of Capraia (1258) and, from 1295, by the Giudicato of Arborea. In 129 it was sold by Mariano II of Arborea to the Republic of Pisa, who held it until the Catalan-Aragonese conquest in 1353.

It became part of the province of Cagliari in 1821.
