= Barrali =

Barrali Barrabi (Sardinian)
- Comune
- Comune di Barrali
- Coat of arms

- Location within Sardinia
- Coordinates: 39°28′N 9°6′E
- Country: Italy
- Region: Sardinia
- Metropolitan city: Cagliari

Government
  - Mayor: Fausto Piga

Area
  - Total: 11.23 km^{2} (4.34 sq mi)
- Elevation: 140 m (460 ft)

Population (2026)
  - Total: 1,087
  - Density: 96.79/km^{2} (250.7/sq mi)
- Demonym: Barralesi
- Time zone: UTC+1 (CET)
  - Summer (DST): UTC+2 (CEST)
- Postal code: 09040
- Dialing code: 070
- Website: Official website

Barrali (Sardinian: Barrabi) is a village and comune (municipality) in the Metropolitan City of Cagliari in the autonomous island region of Sardinia in Italy, located in the Trexenta about 30 kilometres (19 mi) north of Cagliari. It has 1,087 inhabitants.

Barrali borders the municipalities of Donorì, Ortacesus, Pimentel, Samatzai, and Sant'Andrea Frius.

== Demographics ==
As of 2026, the population is 1,087, of which 52.1% are male, and 47.9% are female. Minors make up 13.8% of the population, and seniors make up 26%.

Historical population

Year	Pop.	±%
1861	342	—
1871	316	−7.6%
1881	334	+5.7%
1901	333	−0.3%
1911	389	+16.8%
1921	395	+1.5%
1931	506	+28.1%
1936	530	+4.7%

Year	Pop.	±%
1951	677	+27.7%
1961	805	+18.9%
1971	849	+5.5%
1981	947	+11.5%
1991	1,025	+8.2%
2001	1,076	+5.0%
2011	1,139	+5.9%
2021	1,095	−3.9%

Source: ISTAT

=== Immigration ===
As of 2025, of the known countries of birth of 1,081 residents, the most numerous are: Italy (1,057 – 97.8%), Germany (7 – 0.6%).
