= Serdiana =

- Comune
- Comune di Serdiana
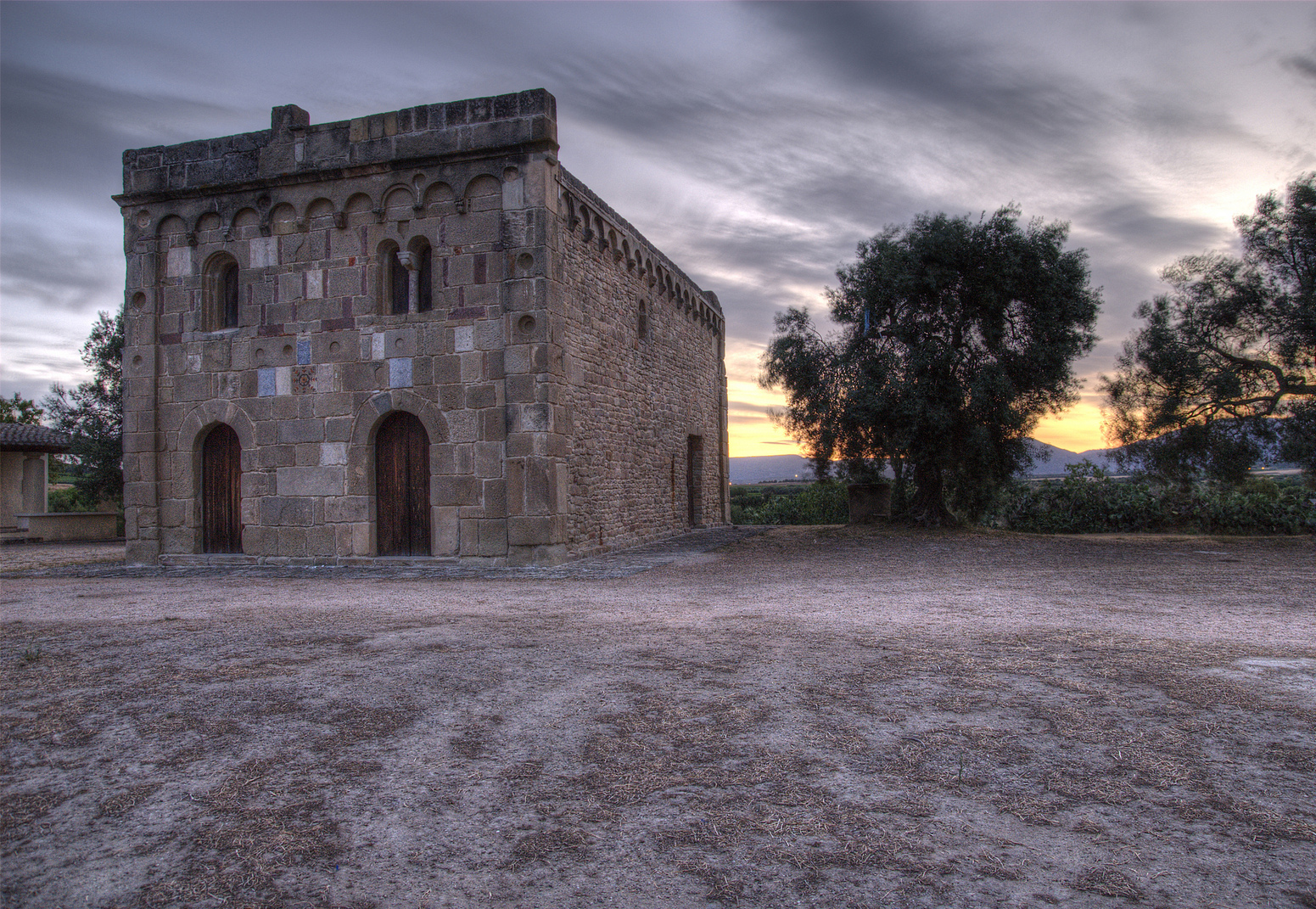
- Church of Santa Maria Sibiola in Serdiana

- Location within Sardinia
- Coordinates: 39°23′N 9°9′E
- Country: Italy
- Region: Sardinia
- Metropolitan city: Cagliari (CA)

Area
  - Total: 55.7 km^{2} (21.5 sq mi)

Population (Dec. 2004)
  - Total: 2,354
  - Density: 42.3/km^{2} (109/sq mi)
- Time zone: UTC+1 (CET)
  - Summer (DST): UTC+2 (CEST)
- Postal code: 09040
- Dialing code: 070

Serdiana is a comune (municipality) in the Metropolitan City of Cagliari in the Italian region Sardinia, located about 20 kilometres (12 mi) north of Cagliari. As of 31 December 2004, it had a population of 2,354 and an area of 55.7 square kilometres (21.5 mi^{2}).

Serdiana borders the following municipalities: Dolianova, Donorì, Monastir, Sant'Andrea Frius, Sestu, Settimo San Pietro, Soleminis, Ussana.

== Demographic evolution ==
Historical population

Year	Pop.	±%
1861	1,006	—
1871	881	−12.4%
1881	857	−2.7%
1901	899	+4.9%
1911	1,063	+18.2%

Year	Pop.	±%
1921	1,322	+24.4%
1931	1,405	+6.3%
1936	1,342	−4.5%
1951	1,560	+16.2%
1961	1,714	+9.9%

Year	Pop.	±%
1971	1,691	−1.3%
1981	1,993	+17.9%
1991	2,160	+8.4%
2001	2,279	+5.5%

Source: Data from ISTAT
