= Campidano =

Plain in Sardinia, Italy

Coordinates: 39.6000°N 8.9000°E

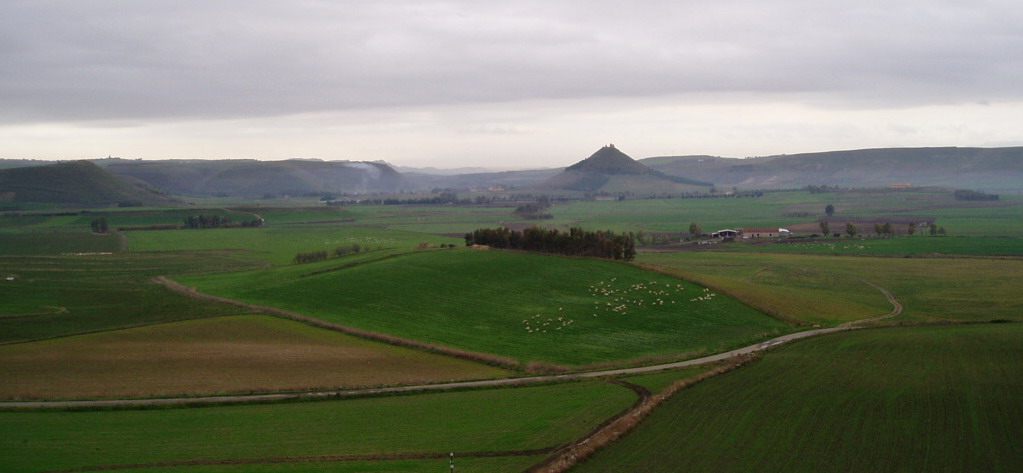
Campidano plain near Las Plassas and the namesake hill and medieval castle in the background.

Campidano (Sardinian: Campidànu) is a plain located in South-Western Sardinia (Italy), covering approximately 100 kilometres between Cagliari and Oristano.

== Geography ==
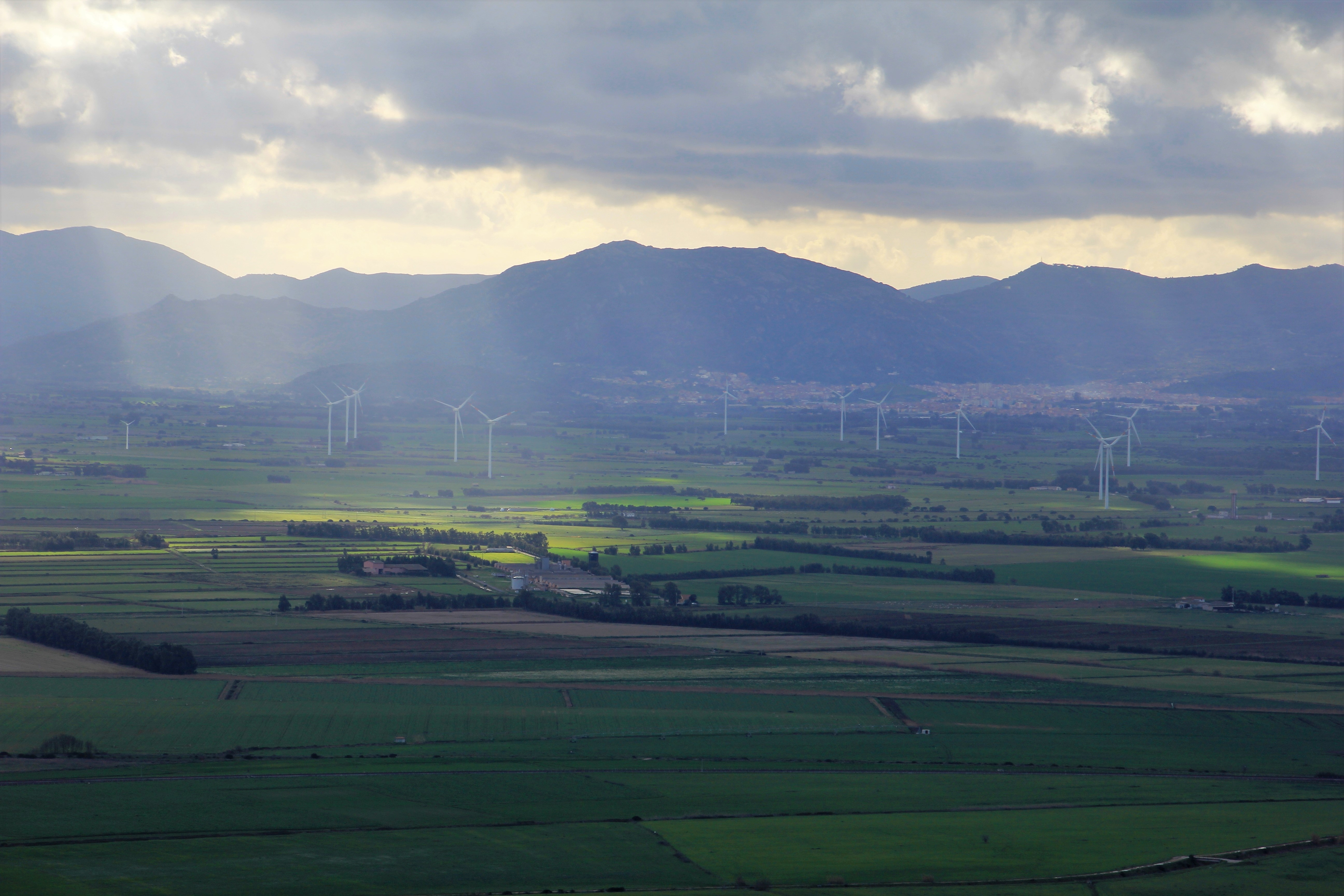
Landscape in the ex Medio Campidano Province

Geologically, it is a graben, a tectonic structure formed in the mid-Pliocene/early Pleistocene (4 to 2 million years ago). Later it was subject to large sedimentary deposition phenomena, creating an overall thickness of 600 m of sediments.

The plain is crossed by the Tirso River, the longest in Sardinia.

== History ==
Agriculture has been successful in Campidano since the Neolithic, continuing on through the Punic and the Romans, who cultivated here grains and grape. Dams of the large Sardinian rivers nourish the artichoke and wheat cultures, also typical products of this zone. Paddy fields are present near Oristano. The Sardinians from this area, and by extension all the people inhabiting the lowlands of Southern Sardinia, are called Campidanese (Sardinian: Campidanesus, Italian: Campidanesi).
