= Gesico =

Gesico Gèsigu
- Comune
- Comune di Gesico
- Location within Sardinia
- Coordinates: 39°37′N 9°6′E
- Country: Italy
- Region: Sardinia
- Metropolitan city: Cagliari (CA)

Area
  - Total: 25.5 km^{2} (9.8 sq mi)
- Elevation: 300 m (980 ft)

Population (Dec. 2004)
  - Total: 954
  - Density: 37.4/km^{2} (96.9/sq mi)
- Time zone: UTC+1 (CET)
  - Summer (DST): UTC+2 (CEST)
- Postal code: 09040
- Dialing code: 070

Gesico (Sardinian: Gèsigu) is a comune (municipality) in the Metropolitan City of Cagliari in the Italian region Sardinia, located about 45 kilometres (28 mi) north of Cagliari. As of 31 December 2004, it had a population of 954 and an area of 25.5 square kilometres (9.8 mi^{2}).

Gesico borders the following municipalities: Escolca, Guamaggiore, Guasila, Mandas, Selegas, Suelli, Villanovafranca.

== Demographic evolution ==
Historical population

Year	Pop.	±%
1861	992	—
1871	814	−17.9%
1881	742	−8.8%
1901	802	+8.1%
1911	846	+5.5%

Year	Pop.	±%
1921	751	−11.2%
1931	864	+15.0%
1936	864	+0.0%
1951	1,189	+37.6%
1961	1,223	+2.9%

Year	Pop.	±%
1971	1,239	+1.3%
1981	1,149	−7.3%
1991	1,020	−11.2%
2001	988	−3.1%

Source: Data from ISTAT
