= Guamaggiore =

Guamaggiore Gomajori
- Comune
- Comune di Guamaggiore
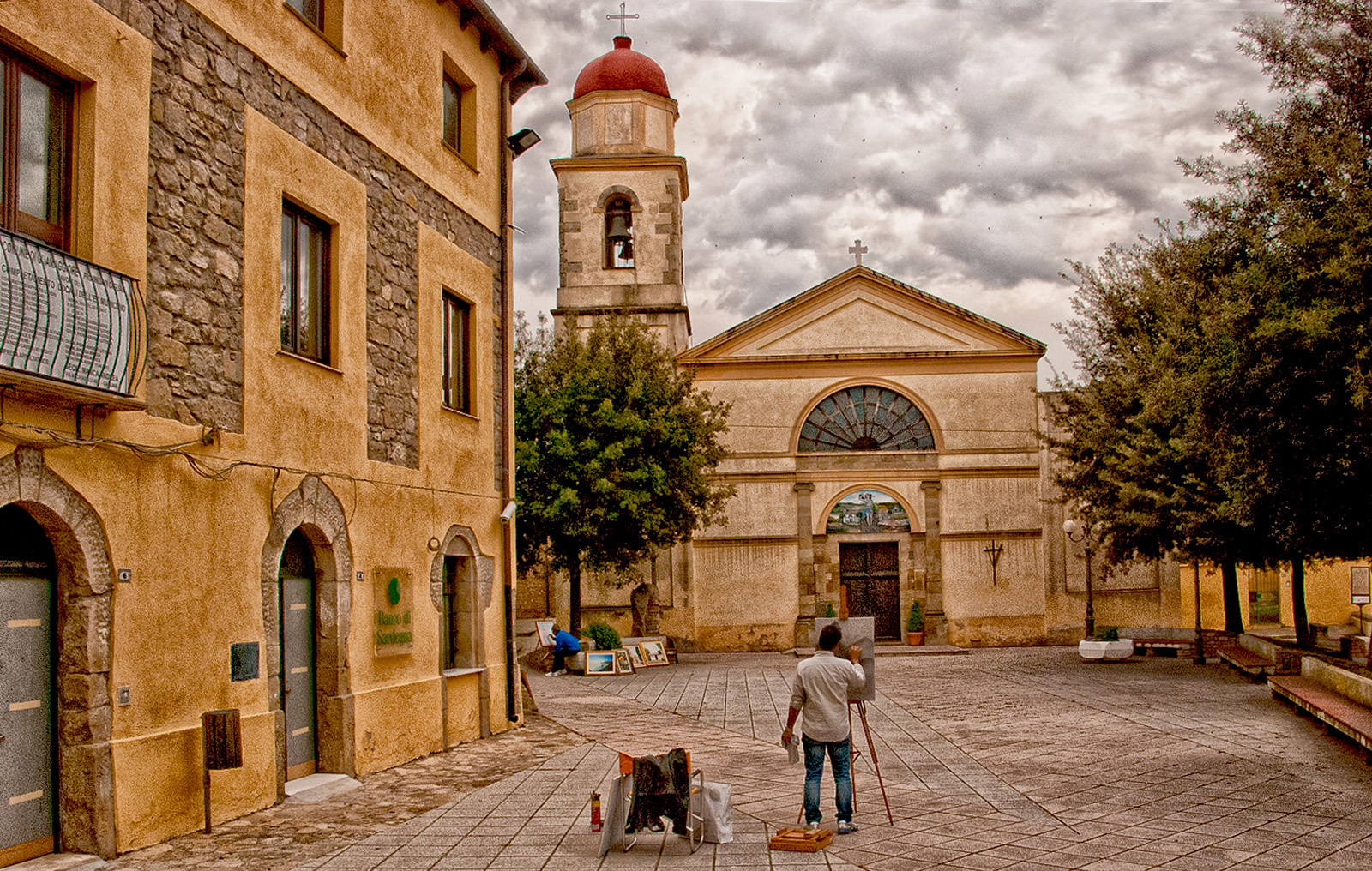
- Parish church of San Sebastiano Martire

- Coat of arms

- Location within Sardinia
- Coordinates: 39°34′N 9°4′E
- Country: Italy
- Region: Sardinia
- Metropolitan city: Cagliari (CA)

Government
  - Mayor: Antonio Cappai

Area
  - Total: 16.8 km^{2} (6.5 sq mi)

Population (31 November 2009)
  - Total: 1,047
  - Density: 62.3/km^{2} (161/sq mi)
- Time zone: UTC+1 (CET)
  - Summer (DST): UTC+2 (CEST)
- Postal code: 09040
- Dialing code: 070

Guamaggiore (Sardinian: Gomajori) is a comune (municipality) in the Metropolitan City of Cagliari in the Italian region Sardinia, located about 40 kilometres (25 mi) north of Cagliari. Guamaggiore borders the following municipalities: Gesico, Guasila, Ortacesus, Selegas. It is home to the Gothic church of St. Peter, dating to the 13th-14th century.
