= Monastir, Sardinia =

Monastir Muristeni
- Comune
- Comune di Monastir
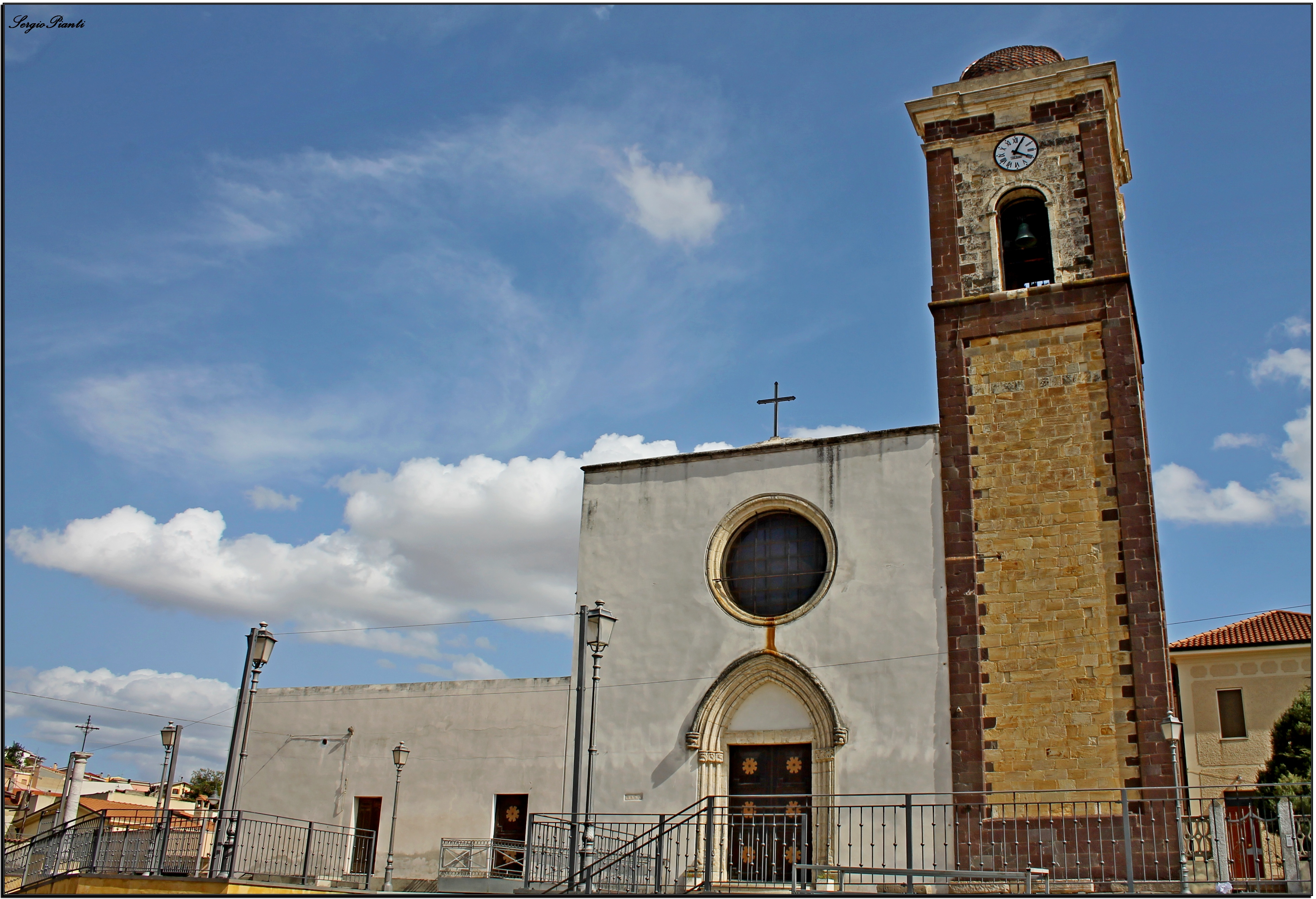

- Location within Sardinia
- Coordinates: 39°23′N 9°3′E
- Country: Italy
- Region: Sardinia
- Metropolitan city: Cagliari (CA)

Area
  - Total: 31.8 km^{2} (12.3 sq mi)

Population (Dec. 2004)
  - Total: 4,532
  - Density: 143/km^{2} (369/sq mi)
- Demonym: Monastiresi
- Time zone: UTC+1 (CET)
  - Summer (DST): UTC+2 (CEST)
- Postal code: 09023
- Dialing code: 070

Monastir (Sardinian: Muristeni) is a comune (municipality) in the Metropolitan City of Cagliari in the Italian region of Sardinia, located about 20 kilometres (12 mi) northwest of Cagliari. As of 2011 census, it had a population of 4,505 inhabitants and an area of 31.8 square kilometres (12.3 mi^{2}).

Monastir borders the following municipalities: Nuraminis, San Sperate, Serdiana, Sestu, Ussana, Villasor.

== Demographic evolution ==
Historical population

Year	Pop.	±%
1861	1,360	—
1871	1,273	−6.4%
1881	1,274	+0.1%
1901	1,293	+1.5%
1911	1,557	+20.4%

Year	Pop.	±%
1921	1,773	+13.9%
1931	2,010	+13.4%
1936	2,016	+0.3%
1951	2,592	+28.6%
1961	3,029	+16.9%

Year	Pop.	±%
1971	3,345	+10.4%
1981	4,149	+24.0%
1991	4,539	+9.4%
2001	4,496	−0.9%

Source: Data from ISTAT
