= Selegas =

Selegas Sèligas
- Comune
- Comune di Selegas
- Location within Sardinia
- Coordinates: 39°34′N 9°6′E
- Country: Italy
- Region: Sardinia
- Metropolitan city: Cagliari (CA)

Area
  - Total: 20.5 km^{2} (7.9 sq mi)

Population (Dec. 2004)
  - Total: 1,511
  - Density: 73.7/km^{2} (191/sq mi)
- Time zone: UTC+1 (CET)
  - Summer (DST): UTC+2 (CEST)
- Postal code: 09040
- Dialing code: 070

Selegas, Sèligas in sardinian language, is a comune (municipality) in the Metropolitan City of Cagliari in the Italian region Sardinia, located about 40 kilometres (25 mi) north of Cagliari. As of 31 December 2004, it had a population of 1,511 and an area of 20.5 square kilometres (7.9 mi^{2}).

Selegas borders the following municipalities: Gesico, Guamaggiore, Ortacesus, Senorbì, Suelli.

== Demographic evolution ==
Historical population

Year	Pop.	±%
1861	1,131	—
1871	1,048	−7.3%
1881	910	−13.2%
1901	969	+6.5%
1911	1,162	+19.9%

Year	Pop.	±%
1921	1,153	−0.8%
1931	1,426	+23.7%
1936	1,488	+4.3%
1951	1,756	+18.0%
1961	1,827	+4.0%

Year	Pop.	±%
1971	1,483	−18.8%
1981	1,439	−3.0%
1991	1,506	+4.7%
2001	1,523	+1.1%

Source: Data from ISTAT
