= Villacidro =

Villacidro Biddacidru (Sardinian)
- Comune
- Comune di Villacidro
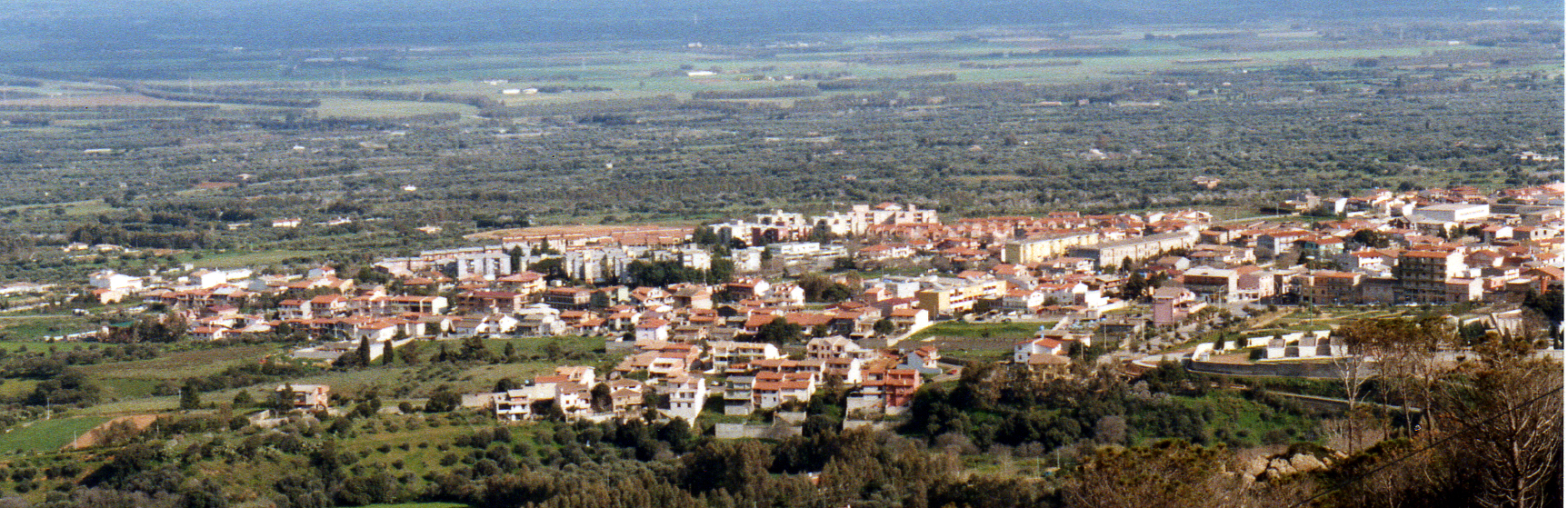
- View of Villacidro

- Coat of arms

- Location within Sardinia
- Coordinates: 39°27′N 08°44′E
- Country: Italy
- Region: Sardinia
- Province: Medio Campidano

Government
  - Mayor: Marta Cabriolu

Area
  - Total: 183.48 km^{2} (70.84 sq mi)
- Elevation: 456 m (1,496 ft)

Population (2026)
  - Total: 12,878
  - Density: 70.187/km^{2} (181.78/sq mi)
- Demonym: Villacidresi
- Time zone: UTC+1 (CET)
  - Summer (DST): UTC+2 (CEST)
- Postal code: 09039
- Dialing code: 070
- Patron saint: Saint Barbara
- Saint day: December 4
- Website: Official website

Villacidro (Italian pronunciation: [villaˈtʃiːdro]; Sardinian: Biddacidru or Bidda de Cidru) is a town and comune (municipality), which along with Sanluri is a co-capital of the province of Medio Campidano in the autonomous island region of Sardinia in Italy. It has 12,878 inhabitants.

Villacidro borders the municipalities of Domusnovas, Gonnosfanadiga, Iglesias, San Gavino Monreale, Sanluri, Serramanna, Vallermosa and Villasor.

== Demographics ==
As of 2026, the population is 12,878, of which 49.7% are male, and 50.3% are female. Minors make up 13.0% of the population, and seniors make up 27.2%.

Historical population

Year	Pop.	±%
1861	5,140	—
1871	4,869	−5.3%
1881	5,191	+6.6%
1901	5,156	−0.7%
1911	5,879	+14.0%
1921	6,371	+8.4%
1931	7,101	+11.5%
1936	7,806	+9.9%

Year	Pop.	±%
1951	10,012	+28.3%
1961	11,266	+12.5%
1971	12,690	+12.6%
1981	14,222	+12.1%
1991	14,984	+5.4%
2001	14,732	−1.7%
2011	14,281	−3.1%
2021	13,317	−6.8%

Source: ISTAT

=== Immigration ===
As of 2025, immigrants make up 2.8% of the population. The 5 largest foreign countries of birth are Germany, France, India, Switzerland, and Romania.

== Climate ==
According to the Köppen climate classification, Villacidro experiences a hot-summer Mediterranean climate (Csa).
