= Pimentel, Sardinia =

Pimentel Pramantellu
- Comune
- Comune di Pimentel
- Location within Sardinia
- Coordinates: 39°29′N 9°4′E
- Country: Italy
- Region: Sardinia
- Metropolitan city: Cagliari (CA)

Area
  - Total: 15.0 km^{2} (5.8 sq mi)

Population (Dec. 2004)
  - Total: 1,200
  - Density: 80/km^{2} (210/sq mi)
- Time zone: UTC+1 (CET)
  - Summer (DST): UTC+2 (CEST)
- Postal code: 09020
- Dialing code: 070

Pimentel (Sardinian: Pramantellu) is a comune (municipality) in the Metropolitan City of Cagliari in the Italian region Sardinia, located about 30 kilometres (19 mi) north of Cagliari. As of 31 December 2004, it had a population of 1,200 and an area of 15.0 square kilometres (5.8 mi^{2}).

Pimentel borders the following municipalities: Barrali, Guasila, Ortacesus, Samatzai.

== Demographic evolution ==
Historical population

Year	Pop.	±%
1861	723	—
1871	641	−11.3%
1881	591	−7.8%
1901	566	−4.2%
1911	647	+14.3%

Year	Pop.	±%
1921	783	+21.0%
1931	814	+4.0%
1936	847	+4.1%
1951	1,144	+35.1%
1961	1,165	+1.8%

Year	Pop.	±%
1971	1,160	−0.4%
1981	1,241	+7.0%
1991	1,249	+0.6%
2001	1,238	−0.9%

Source: Data from ISTAT
