= Suelli =

Suelli Sueddi
- Comune
- Comune di Suelli
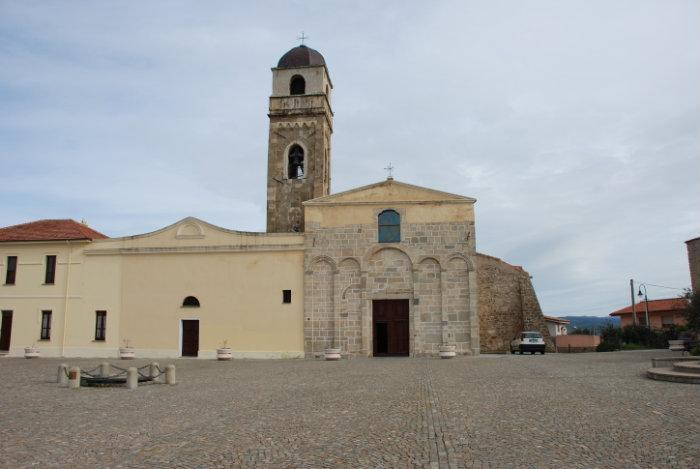

- Location within Sardinia
- Coordinates: 39°34′N 9°8′E
- Country: Italy
- Region: Sardinia
- Metropolitan city: Cagliari (CA)

Area
  - Total: 19.2 km^{2} (7.4 sq mi)

Population (Dec. 2004)
  - Total: 1,179
  - Density: 61.4/km^{2} (159/sq mi)
- Time zone: UTC+1 (CET)
  - Summer (DST): UTC+2 (CEST)
- Postal code: 09040
- Dialing code: 070

Suelli (Sardinian: Sueddi) is a comune (municipality) in the Metropolitan City of Cagliari in the Italian region Sardinia, located about 40 kilometres (25 mi) north of Cagliari. As of 31 December 2004, it had a population of 1,179 and an area of 19.2 square kilometres (7.4 mi^{2}).

Suelli borders the following municipalities: Gesico, Mandas, Selegas, Senorbì, Siurgus Donigala.

== Demographic evolution ==
Historical population

Year	Pop.	±%
1861	1,023	—
1871	857	−16.2%
1881	782	−8.8%
1901	666	−14.8%
1911	851	+27.8%

Year	Pop.	±%
1921	866	+1.8%
1931	932	+7.6%
1936	1,011	+8.5%
1951	1,253	+23.9%
1961	1,228	−2.0%

Year	Pop.	±%
1971	1,052	−14.3%
1981	1,171	+11.3%
1991	1,198	+2.3%
2001	1,171	−2.3%

Source: Data from ISTAT

== See also ==
- Diocese of Suelli
