= Villaspeciosa =

Villaspeciosa Biddaspitziosa
- Comune
- Comune di Villaspeciosa
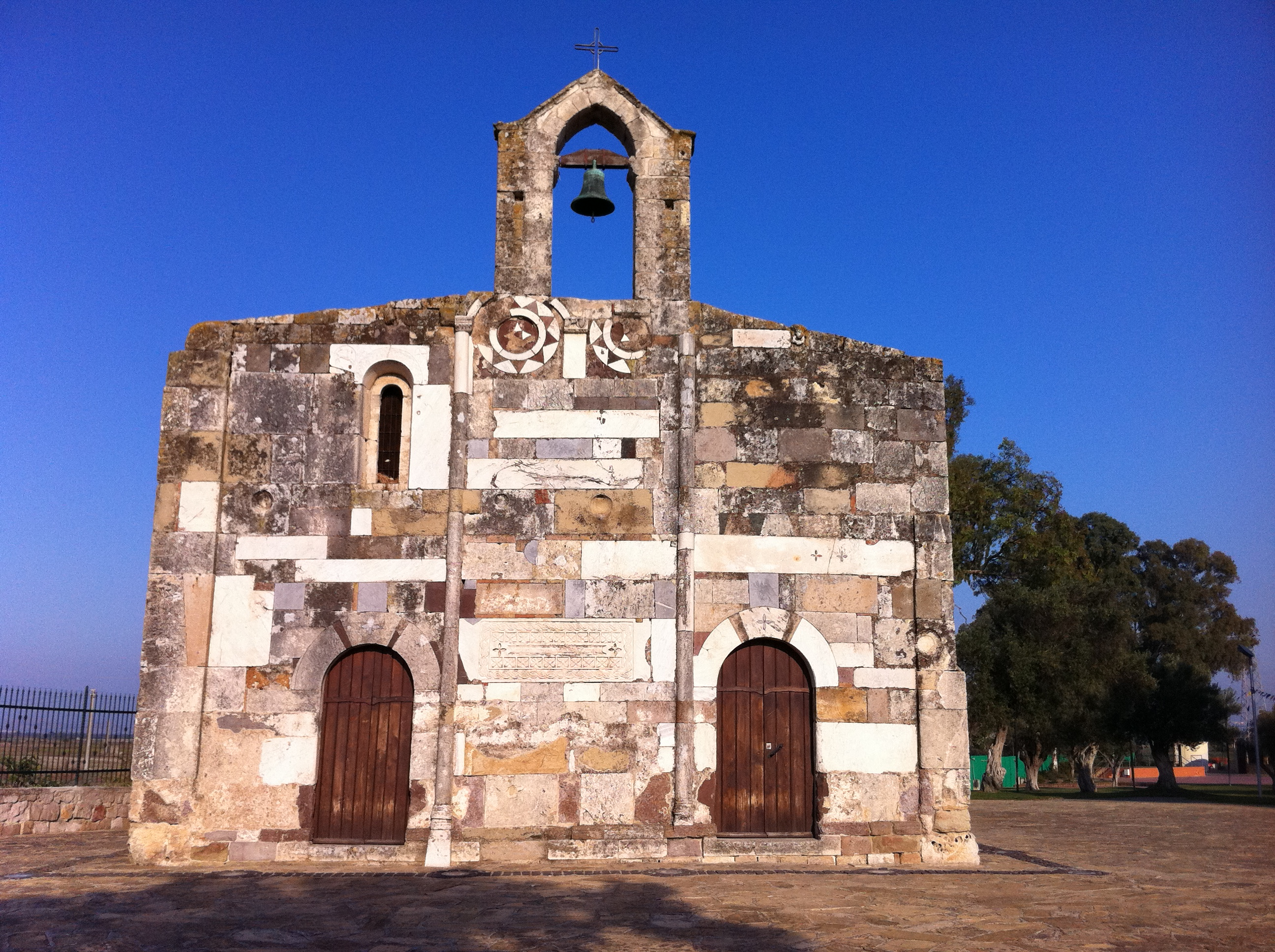
- Medieval church of San Platano

- Location within Sardinia
- Coordinates: 39°19′N 8°56′E
- Country: Italy
- Region: Sardinia
- Metropolitan city: Cagliari (CA)

Area
  - Total: 27.3 km^{2} (10.5 sq mi)

Population (Dec. 2004)
  - Total: 2,039
  - Density: 74.7/km^{2} (193/sq mi)
- Time zone: UTC+1 (CET)
  - Summer (DST): UTC+2 (CEST)
- Postal code: 09010
- Dialing code: 070

Villaspeciosa is a comune (municipality) in the Metropolitan City of Cagliari in the Italian region Sardinia, located about 20 kilometres (12 mi) northwest of Cagliari. As of 31 December 2004, it had a population of 2,039 and an area of 27.3 square kilometres (10.5 mi^{2}).

Villaspeciosa borders the following municipalities: Decimomannu, Decimoputzu, Siliqua, Uta.

== Demographic evolution ==
Historical population

Year	Pop.	±%
1861	544	—
1871	527	−3.1%
1881	427	−19.0%
1901	475	+11.2%
1911	524	+10.3%

Year	Pop.	±%
1921	575	+9.7%
1931	661	+15.0%
1936	681	+3.0%
1951	1,022	+50.1%
1961	1,263	+23.6%

Year	Pop.	±%
1971	1,367	+8.2%
1981	1,653	+20.9%
1991	1,753	+6.0%
2001	1,947	+11.1%

Source: Data from ISTAT
