= Samatzai =

- Comune
- Comune di Samatzai
- Location within Sardinia
- Coordinates: 39°29′N 9°2′E
- Country: Italy
- Region: Sardinia
- Metropolitan city: Cagliari (CA)
- Frazioni: Barrali, Donòri, Guasila, Nuraminis, Pimentel, Serrenti (VS), Ussana

Government
  - Mayor: Agostina Boi

Area
  - Total: 31.12 km^{2} (12.02 sq mi)
- Elevation: 174 m (571 ft)

Population (2018-01-01)
  - Total: 1,746
  - Density: 56.11/km^{2} (145.3/sq mi)
- Time zone: UTC+1 (CET)
  - Summer (DST): UTC+2 (CEST)
- Postal code: 09020
- Dialing code: 070
- ISTAT code: 092053
- Website: Official website

Samatzai is a town in the Metropolitan City of Cagliari, located on the fringe of the Campidano in Sardinia (Italy). It is 33 km away from Cagliari. The name derives from Ancient Greek 'samax', which means "rush mat", or from the Mesopotamian god Samas. Either way, Samatzai is believed to have been inhabited since Nuragic times. The main attraction of note is the 15th-century Church of San Giovanni Battista in the town centre, built in an Aragonese-influenced Gothic style. Other churches include the 17th-century Santa Barbara and the ruined San Marco. The Monte Granitico, a former grain silo that is now a library, is known for its unusual floor plan. Samatzai's economy is mainly focused on the primary sector, despite it being home to one of Italy's most prominent cement works. Residents of the town are known as samatzesi, and the town's patron saint is John the Baptist.
