= Ussana =

Ussana Ùssana
- Comune
- Comune di Ussana
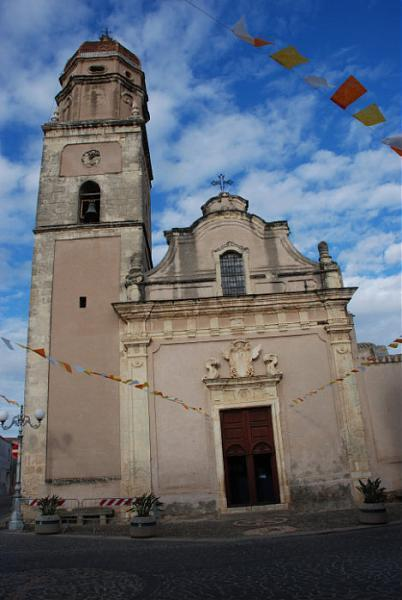

- Location within Sardinia
- Coordinates: 39°24′N 9°5′E
- Country: Italy
- Region: Sardinia
- Metropolitan city: Cagliari (CA)

Area
  - Total: 32.8 km^{2} (12.7 sq mi)
- Elevation: 97 m (318 ft)

Population (Dec. 2004)
  - Total: 3,870
  - Density: 118/km^{2} (306/sq mi)
- Demonym: Ussanesi
- Time zone: UTC+1 (CET)
  - Summer (DST): UTC+2 (CEST)
- Postal code: 09020
- Dialing code: 070

Ussana is a comune (municipality) in the Metropolitan City of Cagliari in the Italian region Sardinia, located about 20 kilometres (12 mi) north of Cagliari. As of 31 December 2004, it had a population of 3,870 and an area of 32.8 square kilometres (12.7 mi^{2}).

Ussana borders the following municipalities: Donorì, Monastir, Nuraminis, Samatzai, Serdiana.

== Demographic evolution ==
Historical population

Year	Pop.	±%
1861	1,310	—
1871	1,151	−12.1%
1881	1,175	+2.1%
1901	1,029	−12.4%
1911	1,126	+9.4%

Year	Pop.	±%
1921	1,290	+14.6%
1931	1,426	+10.5%
1936	1,568	+10.0%
1951	2,136	+36.2%
1961	2,428	+13.7%

Year	Pop.	±%
1971	2,714	+11.8%
1981	3,240	+19.4%
1991	3,610	+11.4%
2001	3,763	+4.2%

Source: Data from ISTAT
