= Villasor =

Villasor Biddesorris
- Comune
- Comune di Villasor
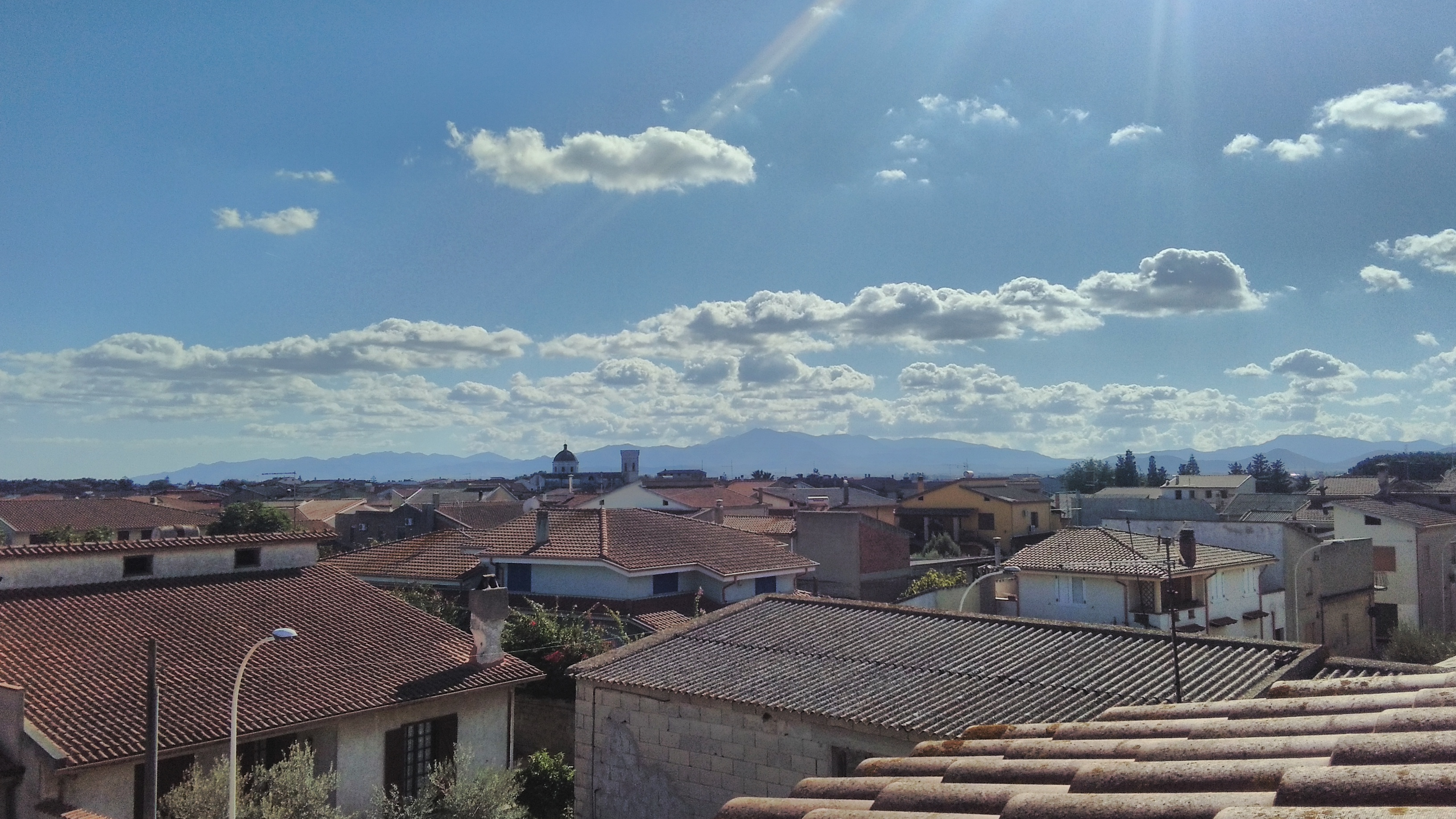

- Location within Sardinia
- Coordinates: 39°23′N 8°56′E
- Country: Italy
- Region: Sardinia
- Metropolitan city: Cagliari (CA)

Area
  - Total: 86.6 km^{2} (33.4 sq mi)
- Elevation: 26 m (85 ft)

Population (Feb. 2016)
  - Total: 6,949
  - Density: 80.2/km^{2} (208/sq mi)
- Demonym: Sorresi
- Time zone: UTC+1 (CET)
  - Summer (DST): UTC+2 (CEST)
- Postal code: 09034
- Dialing code: 070
- Website: Official website

Villasor (Sardinian: Biddesorris, Bidda de Sorris) is a comune (municipality) in the Metropolitan City of Cagliari in the Italian region Sardinia, located about 27 kilometres (17 mi) northwest of Cagliari. As of 29 February 2016, it had a population of 6,949 and an area of 86.6 square kilometres (33.4 mi^{2}).

Villasor borders the following municipalities: Decimomannu, Decimoputzu, Monastir, Nuraminis, San Sperate, Serramanna, Vallermosa, Villacidro.

== Demographic evolution ==
Historical population

Year	Pop.	±%
1861	2,578	—
1871	2,371	−8.0%
1881	2,548	+7.5%
1901	2,630	+3.2%
1911	2,989	+13.7%

Year	Pop.	±%
1921	3,248	+8.7%
1931	3,513	+8.2%
1936	3,692	+5.1%
1951	4,774	+29.3%
1961	5,508	+15.4%

Year	Pop.	±%
1971	6,391	+16.0%
1981	7,070	+10.6%
1991	7,294	+3.2%
2001	7,065	−3.1%

Source: Data from ISTAT
