= Guasila =

Municipality in Sardinia, Italy

- Comune
- Comune di Guasila
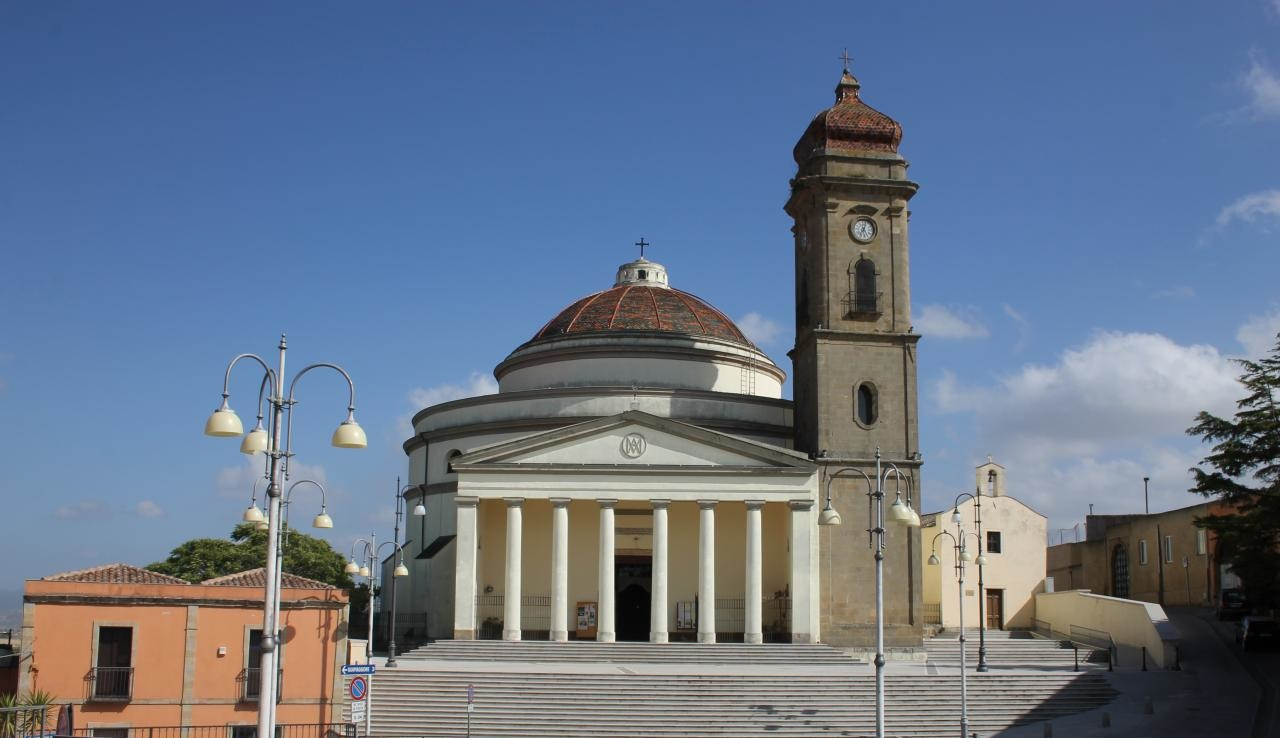

- Location within Sardinia
- Coordinates: 39°34′N 9°3′E
- Country: Italy
- Region: Sardinia
- Metropolitan city: Cagliari (CA)

Area
  - Total: 43.5 km^{2} (16.8 sq mi)

Population (Dec. 2004)
  - Total: 2,871
  - Density: 66.0/km^{2} (171/sq mi)
- Demonym: Guasilesi
- Time zone: UTC+1 (CET)
  - Summer (DST): UTC+2 (CEST)
- Postal code: 09040
- Dialing code: 070

Guasila is a municipality (Italian: comune) in the Metropolitan City of Cagliari in the Italian region Sardinia, located about 40 kilometres (25 mi) north of Cagliari. As of 31 December 2004, it had a population of 2,871 and an area of 43.5 square kilometres (16.8 mi^{2}).

Guasila borders the municipalities of Furtei, Gesico, Guamaggiore, Ortacesus, Pimentel, Samatzai, Segariu, Serrenti, Villamar, and Villanovafranca.

== Demographic evolution ==
Historical population

Year	Pop.	±%
1861	2,234	—
1871	2,056	−8.0%
1881	1,902	−7.5%
1901	1,908	+0.3%
1911	2,122	+11.2%

Year	Pop.	±%
1921	2,149	+1.3%
1931	2,404	+11.9%
1936	2,538	+5.6%
1951	3,173	+25.0%
1961	3,458	+9.0%

Year	Pop.	±%
1971	3,099	−10.4%
1981	3,158	+1.9%
1991	3,063	−3.0%
2001	2,968	−3.1%

Source: Data from ISTAT
