= Donori =

Donòri
- Comune
- Comune di Donòri
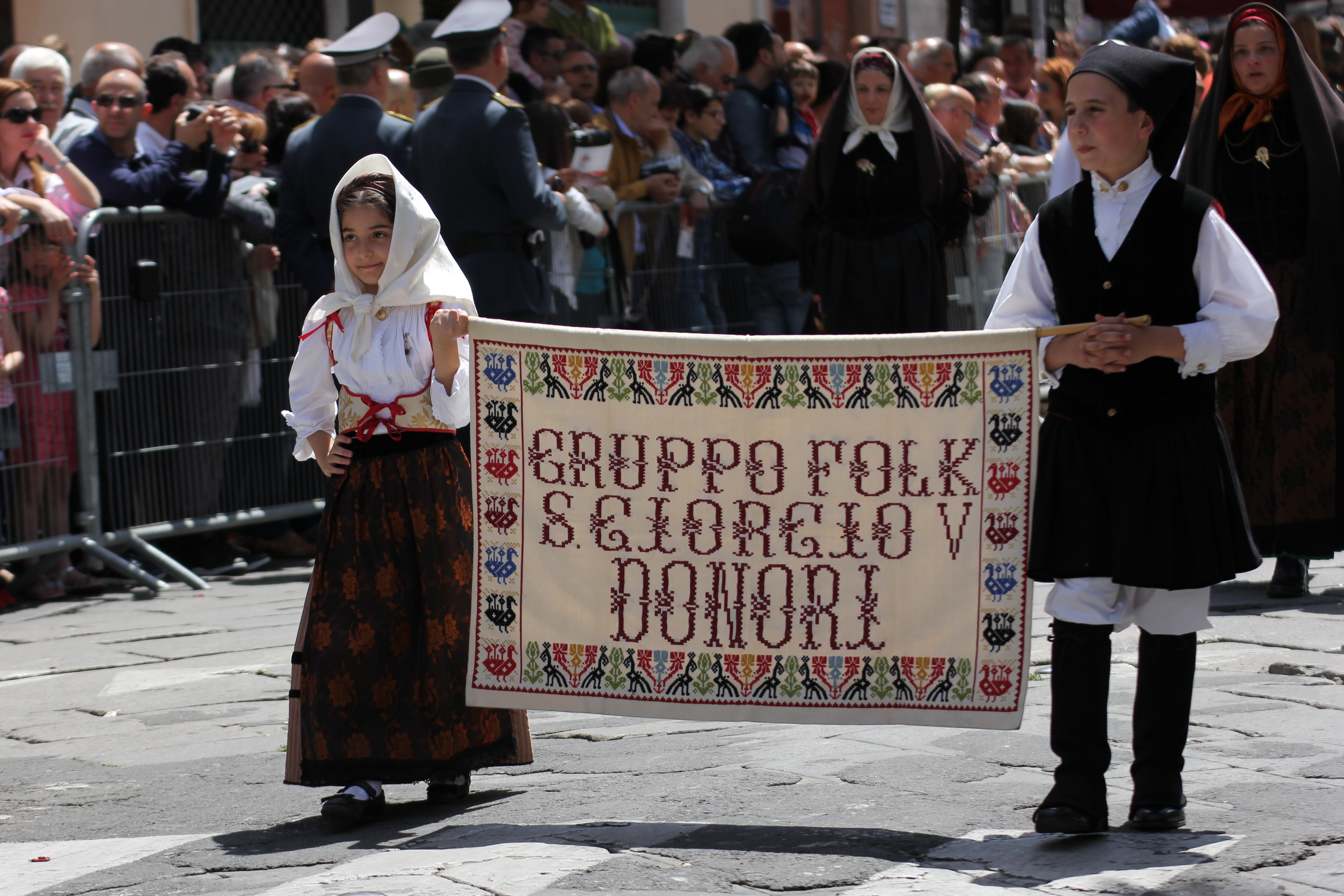

- Location within Sardinia
- Coordinates: 39°26′N 9°7′E
- Country: Italy
- Region: Sardinia
- Metropolitan city: Cagliari (CA)

Area
  - Total: 35.2 km^{2} (13.6 sq mi)
- Elevation: 141 m (463 ft)

Population (Dec. 2004)
  - Total: 2,104
  - Density: 59.8/km^{2} (155/sq mi)
- Time zone: UTC+1 (CET)
  - Summer (DST): UTC+2 (CEST)
- Postal code: 09040
- Dialing code: 070
- Website: Official website

Donòri is a comune (municipality) in the Metropolitan City of Cagliari in the Italian region Sardinia, located about 25 kilometres (16 mi) north of Cagliari. As of 31 December 2004, it had a population of 2,104 and an area of 35.2 square kilometres (13.6 mi^{2}).

Donòri borders the following municipalities: Barrali, Samatzai, Sant'Andrea Frius, Serdiana, Ussana.

== Demographic evolution ==
Historical population

Year	Pop.	±%
1861	815	—
1871	786	−3.6%
1881	806	+2.5%
1901	791	−1.9%
1911	918	+16.1%

Year	Pop.	±%
1921	970	+5.7%
1931	1,179	+21.5%
1936	1,218	+3.3%
1951	1,591	+30.6%
1961	1,924	+20.9%

Year	Pop.	±%
1971	1,859	−3.4%
1981	1,998	+7.5%
1991	2,045	+2.4%
2001	2,138	+4.5%

Source: Data from ISTAT
