= Nuraminis =

Nuraminis Nuràminis
- Comune
- Comune di Nuraminis
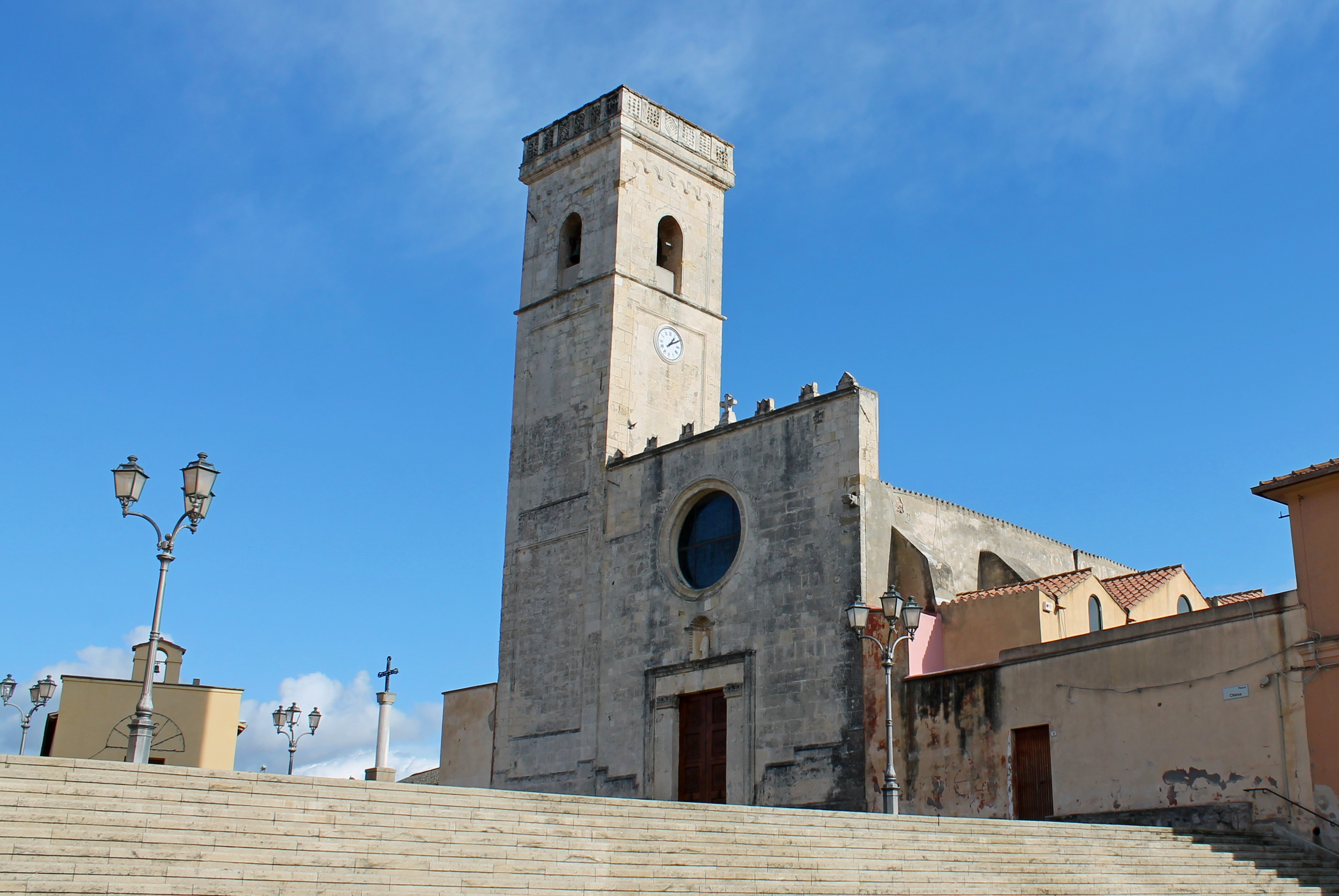

- Location within Sardinia
- Coordinates: 39°27′N 9°1′E
- Country: Italy
- Region: Sardinia
- Metropolitan city: Cagliari (CA)
- Frazioni: Villagreca

Area
  - Total: 45.3 km^{2} (17.5 sq mi)

Population (Dec. 2004)
  - Total: 2,656
  - Density: 58.6/km^{2} (152/sq mi)
- Time zone: UTC+1 (CET)
  - Summer (DST): UTC+2 (CEST)
- Postal code: 09024
- Dialing code: 070

Nuraminis (Sardinian: Nuràminis) is a comune (municipality) in the Metropolitan City of Cagliari in the Italian region Sardinia, located about 25 kilometres (16 mi) northwest of Cagliari. As of 31 December 2004, it had a population of 2,656 and an area of 45.3 square kilometres (17.5 mi^{2}).

The municipality of Nuraminis contains the frazione (subdivision) Villagreca.

Nuraminis borders the following municipalities: Monastir, Samatzai, Serramanna, Serrenti, Ussana, Villasor.

== Demographic evolution ==
Historical population

Year	Pop.	±%
1861	2,057	—
1871	2,030	−1.3%
1881	2,010	−1.0%
1901	2,015	+0.2%
1911	2,172	+7.8%

Year	Pop.	±%
1921	2,185	+0.6%
1931	2,446	+11.9%
1936	2,517	+2.9%
1951	2,935	+16.6%
1961	3,045	+3.7%

Year	Pop.	±%
1971	3,024	−0.7%
1981	3,107	+2.7%
1991	3,124	+0.5%
2001	2,822	−9.7%

Source: Data from ISTAT
