= Trexenta =

Traditional subregion of Sardinia, Italy

Coordinates: 39°37′44″N 9°09′00″E

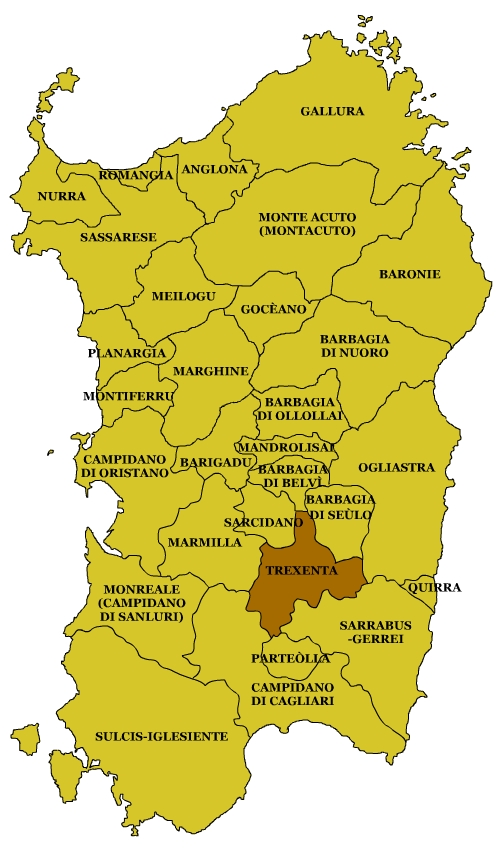
Traditional location of Trexenta.

Trexenta (Sardinian: [tɾɛˈʒɛnta]), sometimes known as Tregenta (Italian: [treˈdʒɛnta]), is a traditional subregion of Sardinia, Italy, located in the northern part of the former Province of South Sardinia, now in the Metropolitan City of Cagliari. It encompasses an area of c. 400 km², including 13 municipalities.

== Overview ==
The terrain is mostly hilly in the eastern part, becoming more plain southwards. Economy is mostly based on agriculture, with the cultivation of cereals, olives and vines.

In the Middle Ages it was part of the Judicate of Cagliari.
