= Sestu =

- Comune
- Comune di Sestu
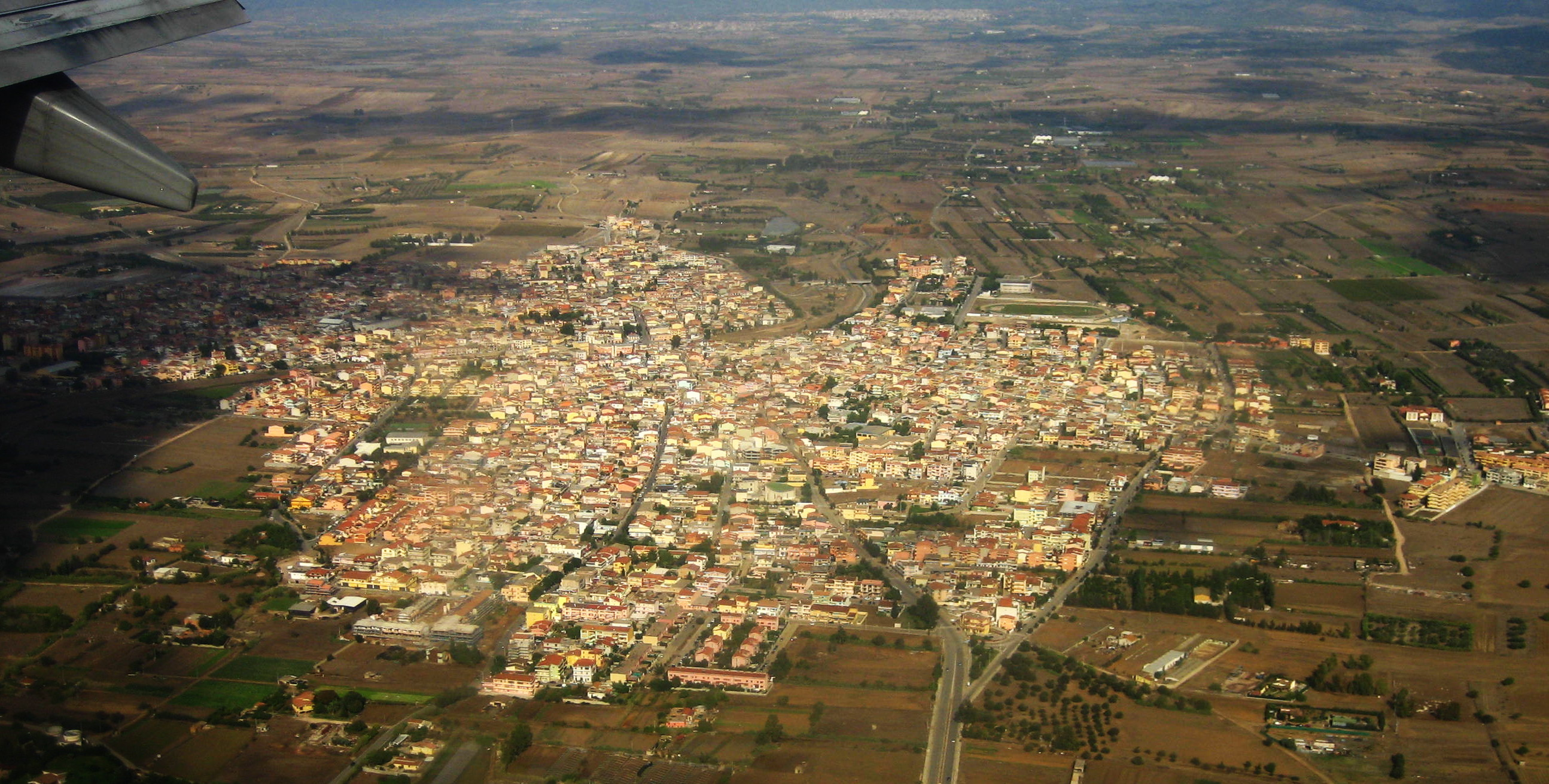

- Coat of arms

- Location within Sardinia
- Coordinates: 39°18′N 9°06′E
- Country: Italy
- Region: Sardinia
- Metropolitan city: Cagliari (CA)
- Frazioni: Cortexandra

Government
  - Mayor: Maria Paola Secci

Area
  - Total: 48.32 km^{2} (18.66 sq mi)
- Elevation: 44 m (144 ft)

Population (2025)
  - Total: 20,747
  - Density: 429.4/km^{2} (1,112/sq mi)
- Demonym: Sestesi
- Time zone: UTC+1 (CET)
  - Summer (DST): UTC+2 (CEST)
- Postal code: 09028
- Dialing code: 070
- Website: Official website

Sestu is a comune (municipality) in the Metropolitan City of Cagliari in the Italian region Sardinia, located about 10 kilometres (6 mi) north of Cagliari. It has 20,747 inhabitants as of 2025.

== Demographics ==
Historical population

Year	Pop.	±%
1861	1,680	—
1871	1,573	−6.4%
1881	1,756	+11.6%
1901	2,289	+30.4%
1911	2,752	+20.2%
1921	3,227	+17.3%
1931	3,771	+16.9%
1936	4,392	+16.5%

Year	Pop.	±%
1951	5,640	+28.4%
1961	6,739	+19.5%
1971	8,730	+29.5%
1981	10,561	+21.0%
1991	12,182	+15.3%
2001	15,233	+25.0%
2011	19,893	+30.6%
2021	20,800	+4.6%

Source: ISTAT

== Archaeology ==
In 2025, a Punic necropolis from the 4th–3rd century BC was uncovered in Sestu during construction works. Excavations revealed six amphorae with human remains, a common Punic burial practice, along with ceramics.

== Culture ==
In Sestu there are two folk groups, the "I Nuraghi" folk group and the "San Gemiliano" folk group. The two groups are dedicated to preserving the clothing, linguistic, and social expression traditions, such as dance and singing, typical of the Campidano and Sestu areas. The culture of Sestu is part of the typical traditions of the Sardinian region of Campidano of Cagliari, where launeddas, guitar singing and sung poetry and up to the use of the more common diatonic accordion called sonètu in the Sardinian language.

In the field of traditional dance, the 2 groups propose and perform traditional dances from all over Sardinia, such as the circle dances called ballitus or ballus tundus and the passu torrau dances, dances characterized by a continuous "returning" of the step in a rhythmic way, up to the typical dances of the Campidano itself, the dances made with the music of the launeddas such as the fiorassiu, the puntu 'e organu and the mediana pippia.

Since 2004, the folk group "I Nuraghi" has organized the International Folk Fest every summer, where groups from all over the world can perform and showcase their culture.

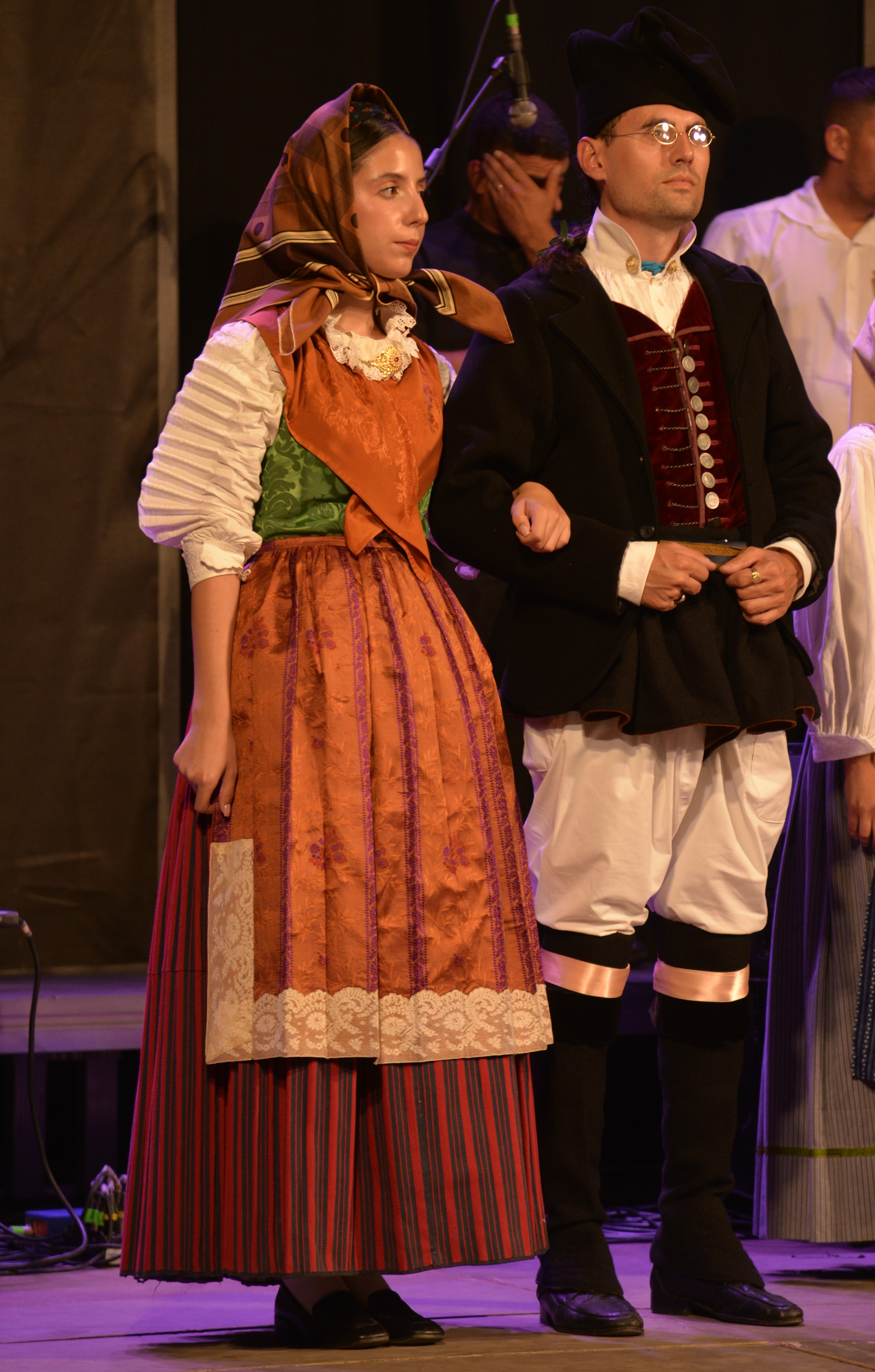
Traditional dress of Sestu
