= List of municipalities of the Province of Sulcis Iglesiente =

This is a list of the 24 municipalities (comuni) of the Province of Sulcis Iglesiente in the autonomous region of Sardinia in Italy.

== List ==
Municipality	Native name	Population (2026)	Area (km²)	Density
Buggerru	Bugèrru	1,007	48.33	20.8
Calasetta	Câdesédda, Cal 'e Sèda	2,776	31.06	89.4
Carbonia	Carbònia/Crabònia	25,353	145.54	174.2
Carloforte	U Pàize, Carlufòrti	5,851	51.10	114.5
Domusnovas	Domusnòas	5,694	80.59	70.7
Fluminimaggiore	Frùmini Majòri	2,575	108.18	23.8
Giba	Gìba	1,861	30.44	61.1
Gonnesa	Gonnèsa	4,456	48.06	92.7
Iglesias	Igrèsias/Bidd'e Crèsia	24,409	208.23	117.2
Masainas	Masàinas	1,203	23.69	50.8
Musei	Mùsei	1,512	20.27	74.6
Narcao	Narcàu	2,967	85.88	34.5
Nuxis	Nùxis/Nùcis	1,382	61.59	22.4
Perdaxius	Perdàxius	1,276	29.50	43.3
Piscinas	Piscìnas	758	16.89	44.9
Portoscuso	Portescùsi	4,689	38.09	123.1
San Giovanni Suergiu	Santu Giuànni Suèrgiu/Santu Juanni Sruèxu	5,523	72.37	76.3
Santadi	Santàdi	2,626	36.68	71.6
Sant'Anna Arresi	Arrèsi	10,404	87.90	118.4
Sant'Antioco	Santu Antiògu	3,029	116.49	26.0
Teulada	Teulàda	3,156	246.19	12.8
Tratalias	Tratalìas	988	31.00	31.9
Villamassargia	Bidda Matzràxia	3,278	91.39	35.9
Villaperuccio	Sa Baronìa	1,007	36.43	27.6

== See also ==
- List of municipalities of Sardinia
- List of municipalities of Italy
