= List of municipalities of the Province of Carbonia-Iglesias =

The following is a list of the 23 municipalities (comuni) of the former Province of Carbonia-Iglesias, Sardinia, Italy.

== List ==
ISTAT Code	Comune	Population (2009)
107001	Buggerru	1,123
107002	Calasetta	2,919
107003	Carbonia	29,821
107004	Carloforte	6,465
107005	Domusnovas	6,399
107006	Fluminimaggiore	3,005
107007	Giba	2,139
107008	Gonnesa	5,157
107009	Iglesias	27,593
107010	Masainas	1,362
107011	Musei	1,506
107012	Narcao	3,403
107013	Nuxis	1,694
107014	Perdaxius	1,472
107015	Piscinas	851
107016	Portoscuso	5,280
107017	San Giovanni Suergiu	6,044
107018	Santadi	3,631
107019	Sant'Anna Arresi	2,692
107020	Sant'Antioco	11,730
107021	Tratalias	1,107
107022	Villamassargia	3,698
107023	Villaperuccio	1,095
	Total	130,186

== See also ==
- List of municipalities of Italy
