= Assemini =

Assemini Assèmini (Sardinian)
- Comune
- Comune di Assemini
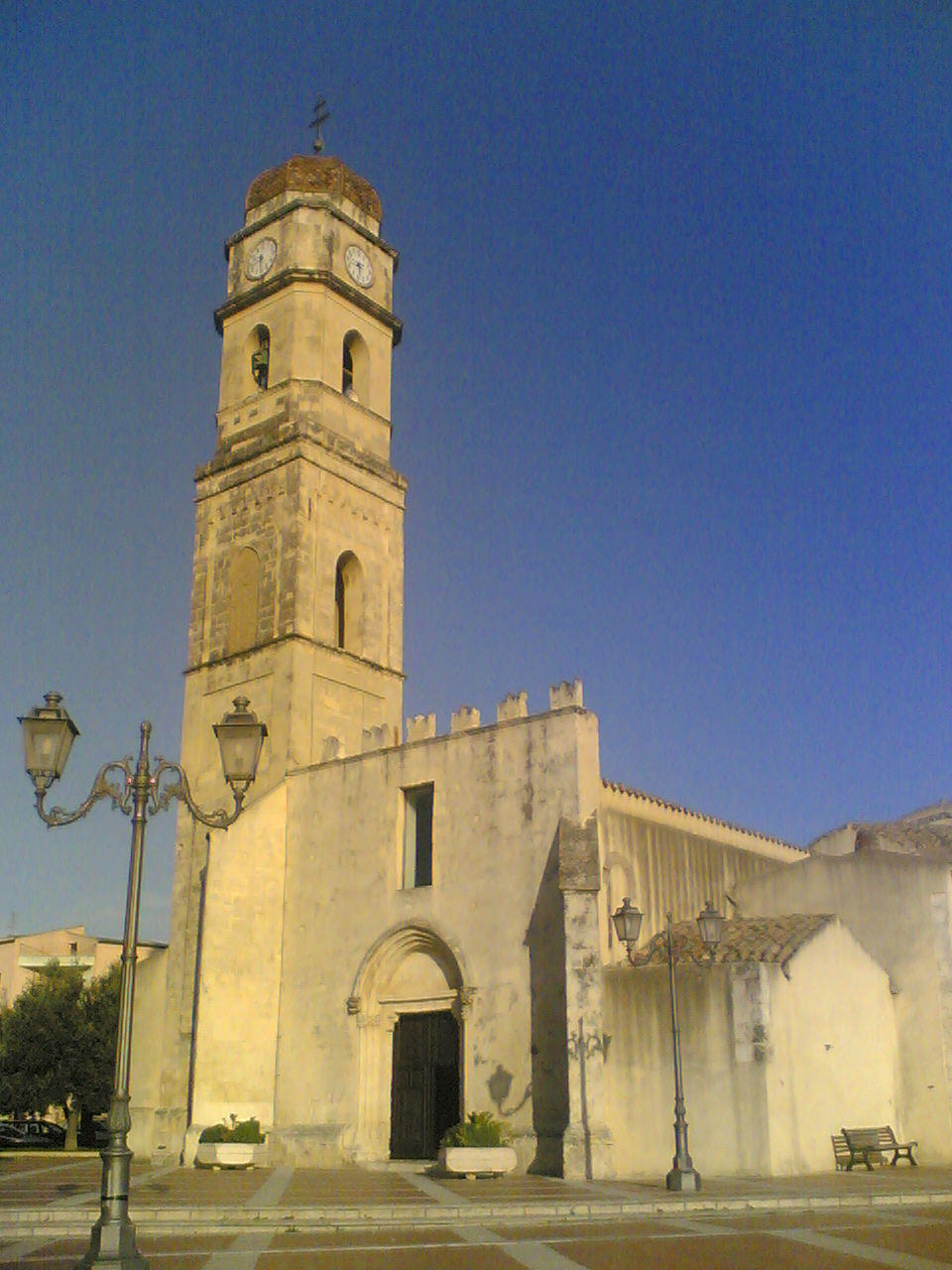
- Saint Peter parish

- Coat of arms

- Location of Assemini in Sardinia
- Coordinates: 39°17′N 9°0′E
- Country: Italy
- Region: Sardinia
- Metropolitan city: Cagliari

Government
  - Mayor: Sabrina Licheri (M5S)

Area
  - Total: 118.17 km^{2} (45.63 sq mi)
- Elevation: 6 m (20 ft)

Population (2026)
  - Total: 25,575
  - Density: 216.43/km^{2} (560.54/sq mi)
- Demonym: Asseminesi
- Time zone: UTC+1 (CET)
  - Summer (DST): UTC+2 (CEST)
- Postal code: 09032
- Dialing code: 070
- Patron saint: St. Peter
- Saint day: June 29
- Website: Official website

Assemini (Italian: [asˈsɛːmini]; Sardinian: Assèmini [aˈsemini]) is a town and comune (municipality) in the Metropolitan City of Cagliari in the autonomous island region of Sardinia in Italy, located about 12 kilometres (7 mi) northwest of Cagliari in the plain of the Cixerri, Flumini Mannu and Sa Nuxedda rivers. It has 25,575 inhabitants.

It includes forest areas which are part of the Sulcis Regional Park. It also has a long tradition in the production of ceramics, starting in the Carthaginian era.

Assemini is part of the Cagliari metropolitan area and borders the municipalities of Cagliari, Capoterra, Decimomannu, Elmas, Nuxis, San Sperate, Santadi, Sarroch, Sestu, Siliqua, Uta and Villa San Pietro.

== Demographics ==
As of 2026, the population is 25,575, of which 48.9% are male, and 51.1% are female. Minors make up 12.9% of the population, and seniors make up 23.7%.

Historical population

Year	Pop.	±%
1861	2,112	—
1871	1,853	−12.3%
1881	1,954	+5.5%
1901	2,438	+24.8%
1911	3,082	+26.4%
1921	3,216	+4.3%
1931	4,086	+27.1%
1936	4,934	+20.8%

Year	Pop.	±%
1951	6,902	+39.9%
1961	9,439	+36.8%
1971	11,627	+23.2%
1981	16,830	+44.7%
1991	20,491	+21.8%
2001	23,973	+17.0%
2011	26,620	+11.0%
2021	26,159	−1.7%

Source: ISTAT

=== Immigration ===
As of 2025, of the known countries of birth of 25,444 residents, the most numerous are: Italy (24,588 – 96.6%).

== Main sights ==
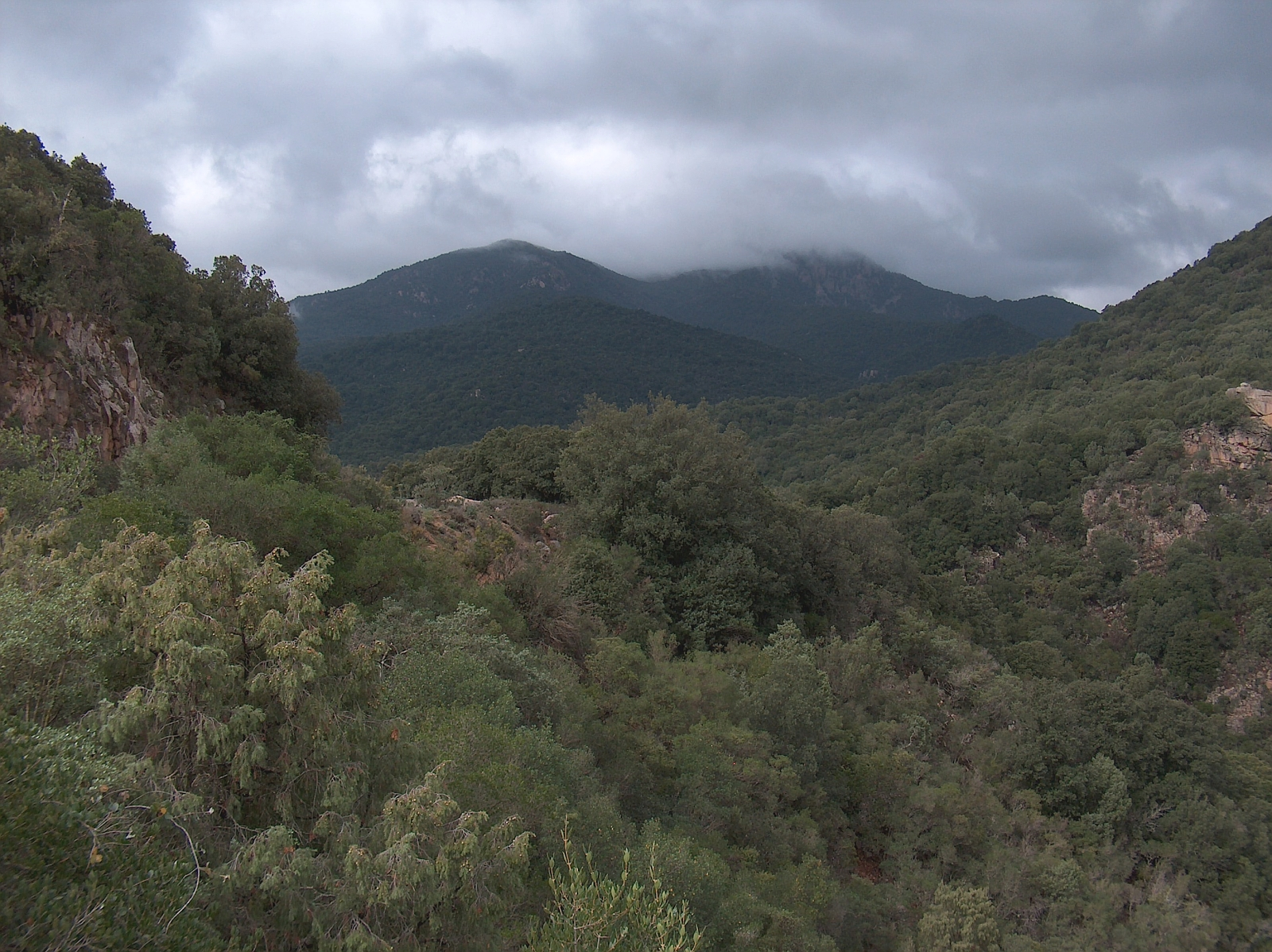
View of Monte Lattias in the territory of Assemini

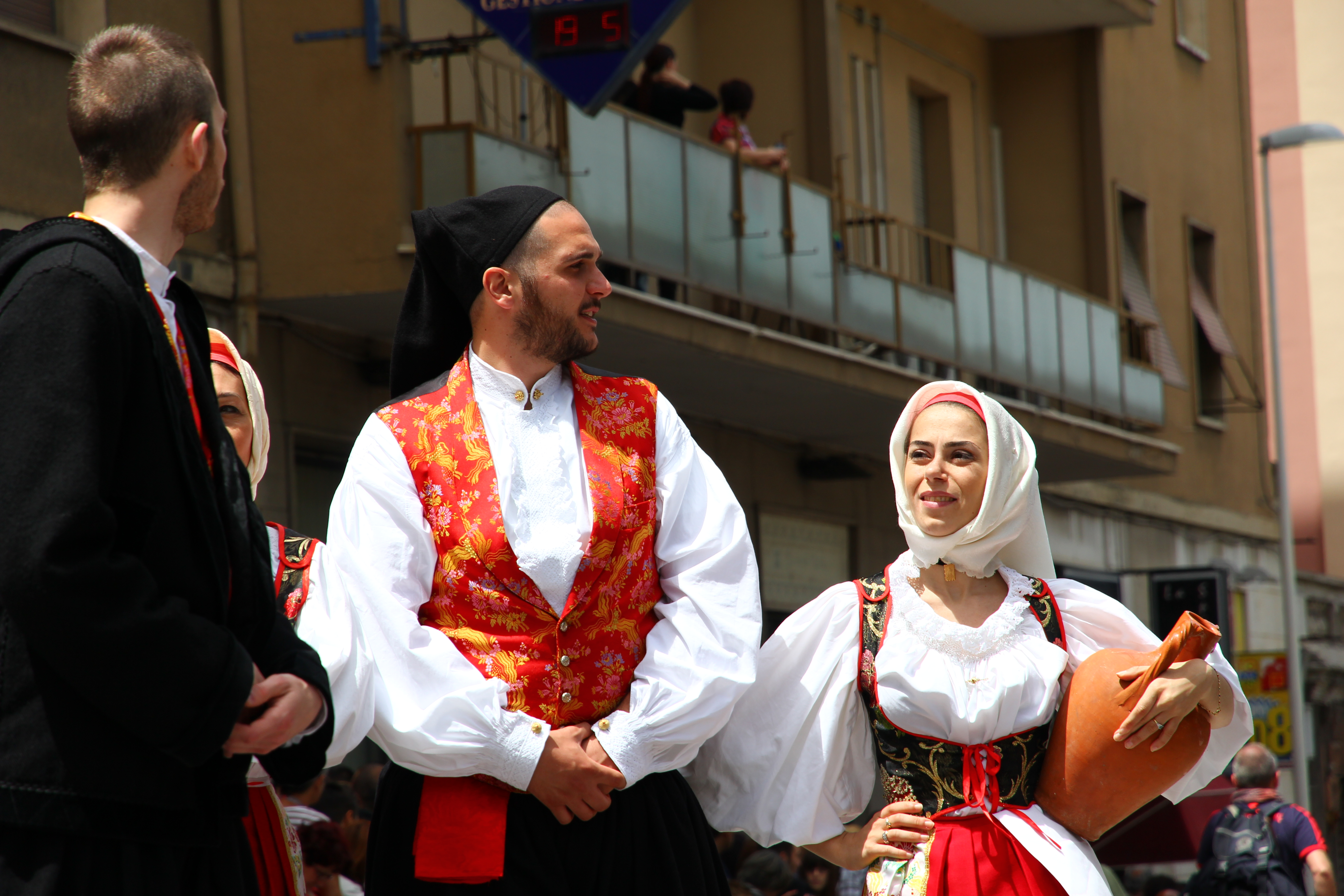
Traditional dress

- Historical Campidano-type houses.
- Church of St. Peter, dating from 11th century but mostly rebuilt in Gothic style under Aragonese control in the 16th century. The square façade and the lower part of the bell tower are from the 18th century. The interior has a nave with side chapels in Gothic style.
- Pre-Romanesque Church and Oratory of St. John (San Giovanni, 9th-10th century). It is unusual for its cross plan enclosed within a square, surmounted by a dome, while the arms of the cross are barrel-vaulted. The façade is in limestone.

== See also ==
- Cagliari metropolitan area
