= Giba, Sardinia =

Giba
- Comune
- Comune di Giba
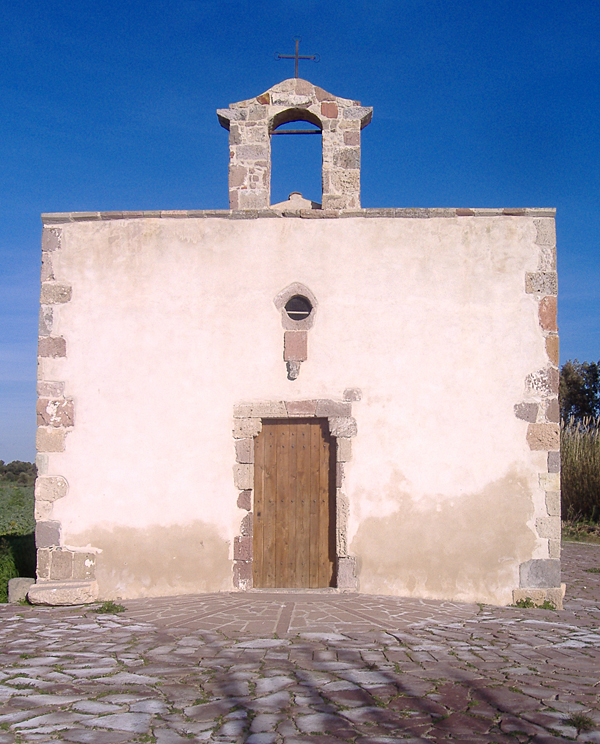
- Santa Marta Church

- Location within Sardinia
- Coordinates: 39°4′N 8°38′E
- Country: Italy
- Region: Sardinia
- Province: Sulcis Iglesiente
- Frazioni: Villarios

Government
  - Mayor: Andrea Pisanu

Area
  - Total: 30.44 km^{2} (11.75 sq mi)
- Elevation: 59 m (194 ft)

Population (2026)
  - Total: 1,861
  - Density: 61.14/km^{2} (158.3/sq mi)
- Demonym: Gibai
- Time zone: UTC+1 (CET)
  - Summer (DST): UTC+2 (CEST)
- Postal code: 09010
- Dialing code: 0781
- Patron saint: St. Peter
- Saint day: 29 June
- Website: Official website

Giba is a town and comune (municipality) in the province of Sulcis Iglesiente in the autonomous island region of Sardinia in Italy. It has 1,861 inhabitants.

Located in the southwestern Sulcis region of the island, the municipality consists of the villages of Giba proper, and Villarios, some 4 kilometres (2 mi) to the southwest, bordering on Masainas to the south, Piscinas to the east, Villaperuccio to the northeast, Tratalias to the north, and San Giovanni Suergiu to the northwest.

Two state roads cross the territory of Giba, the SS195 "Sulcitana" and the SS293.

== Demographics ==
As of 2026, the population is 1,861, of which 49.0% are male, and 51.0% are female. Minors make up 9.6% of the population, and seniors make up 33.6%.

Historical population

Year	Pop.	±%
1861	815	—
1871	833	+2.2%
1881	869	+4.3%
1901	924	+6.3%
1911	1,120	+21.2%
1921	1,218	+8.7%
1931	1,335	+9.6%
1936	1,525	+14.2%

Year	Pop.	±%
1951	2,297	+50.6%
1961	2,645	+15.2%
1971	2,288	−13.5%
1981	2,286	−0.1%
1991	2,286	+0.0%
2001	2,093	−8.4%
2011	2,120	+1.3%
2021	1,919	−9.5%

Source: ISTAT

=== Immigration ===
As of 2025, immigrants make up 5.4% of the total population. The 5 largest foreign countries of birth are Poland, Romania, Morocco, Germany, and France.
