= Narcao =

Narcao Narcau (Sardinian)
- Comune
- Comune di Narcao
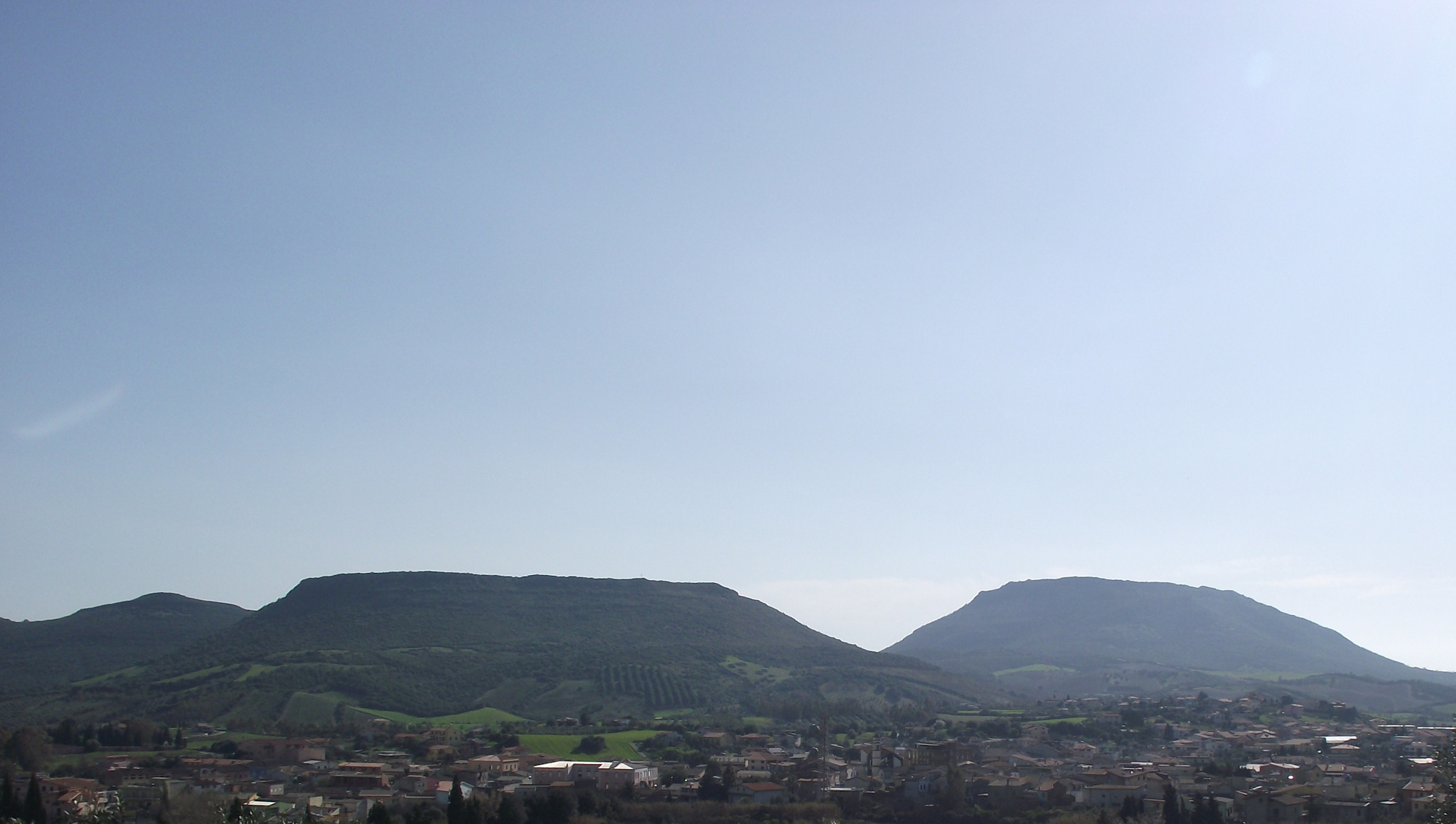
- View of Narcao

- Coat of arms

- Location within Sardinia
- Coordinates: 39°10′N 8°41′E
- Country: Italy
- Region: Sardinia
- Province: Sulcis Iglesiente
- Frazioni: Riomurtas, Terraseo, Pesus, Is Meddas, Is Sais, Is Aios, Terrubia, Is Cherchis

Government
  - Mayor: Danilo Serra

Area
  - Total: 85.88 km^{2} (33.16 sq mi)
- Elevation: 127 m (417 ft)

Population (2026)
  - Total: 2,967
  - Density: 34.55/km^{2} (89.48/sq mi)
- Demonym: Narcaresi
- Time zone: UTC+1 (CET)
  - Summer (DST): UTC+2 (CEST)
- Postal code: 09010
- Dialing code: 0781
- Patron saint: St. Nicholas
- Saint day: 14 August
- Website: Official website

Narcao (Sardinian: Narcau) is a town and comune (municipality) in the Province of Sulcis Iglesiente in the autonomous island region of Sardinia in Italy, located about 40 kilometres (25 mi) west of Cagliari and about 15 kilometres (9 mi) east of Carbonia. It has 2,967 inhabitants.

Narcao borders the municipalities of Carbonia, Iglesias, Nuxis, Perdaxius, Siliqua, Villamassargia, and Villaperuccio.

In the frazione of Tarraseo there are remains of a Punic-Roman temple dedicated to the goddess Demetra.

== Demographics ==
As of 2026, the population is 2,967, of which 50.9% are male, and 49.1% are female. Minors make up 10.8% of the population, and seniors make up 31.7%.

Historical population

Year	Pop.	±%
1861	1,750	—
1871	1,625	−7.1%
1881	1,986	+22.2%
1901	2,186	+10.1%
1911	2,142	−2.0%
1921	1,968	−8.1%
1931	2,469	+25.5%
1936	2,484	+0.6%

Year	Pop.	±%
1951	2,795	+12.5%
1961	3,330	+19.1%
1971	3,002	−9.8%
1981	3,332	+11.0%
1991	3,579	+7.4%
2001	3,365	−6.0%
2011	3,373	+0.2%
2021	3,105	−7.9%

Source: ISTAT

=== Immigration ===
As of 2025, immigrants make up 2.7% of the total population. The 5 largest foreign countries of birth are Morocco, Germany, France, China, and Paraguay.

== Twin towns - sister cities ==
- Bovegno, Italy
- Les Rues-des-Vignes, France
