= Villamassargia =

Villamassargia Bidda Matzràxia (Sardinian)
- Comune
- Comune di Villamassargia
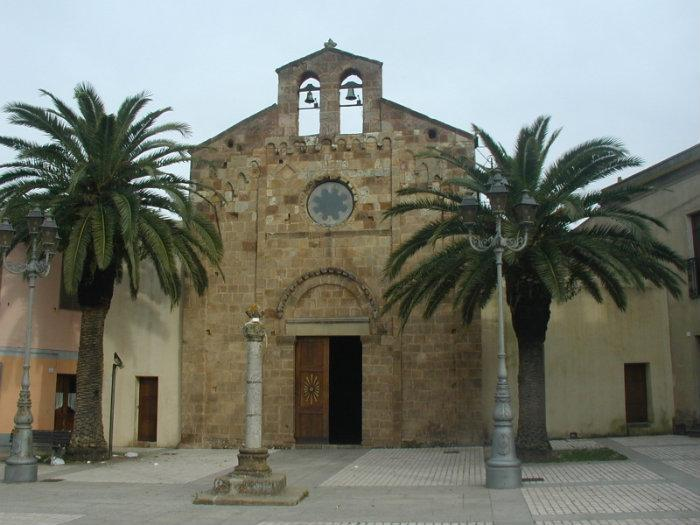
- Church of Nostra Signora del Pilar

- Coat of arms

- Location within Sardinia
- Coordinates: 39°17′N 8°38′E
- Country: Italy
- Region: Sardinia
- Province: Sulcis Iglesiente

Government
  - Mayor: Francesco Porcu

Area
  - Total: 91.39 km^{2} (35.29 sq mi)
- Elevation: 121 m (397 ft)

Population (2026)
  - Total: 3,278
  - Density: 35.87/km^{2} (92.90/sq mi)
- Time zone: UTC+1 (CET)
  - Summer (DST): UTC+2 (CEST)
- Postal code: 09010
- Dialing code: 0781
- Website: Official website

Villamassargia (Sardinian: Bidda Matzràxia) is a town and comune (municipality) in the Province of Sulcis Iglesiente in the autonomous island region of Sardinia in Italy, located about 40 kilometres (25 mi) west of Cagliari and about 20 kilometres (12 mi) northeast of Carbonia. It has 3,278 inhabitants.

Villamassargia borders the municipalities of Domusnovas, Iglesias, Musei, Narcao, and Siliqua.

== Demographics ==
As of 2026, the population is 3,278, of which 50.4% are male, and 49.6% are female. Minors make up 10.3% of the population, and seniors make up 31.4%.

Historical population

Year	Pop.	±%
1861	1,847	—
1871	1,967	+6.5%
1881	2,043	+3.9%
1901	1,853	−9.3%
1911	2,184	+17.9%
1921	2,332	+6.8%
1931	2,386	+2.3%
1936	2,449	+2.6%

Year	Pop.	±%
1951	2,823	+15.3%
1961	3,276	+16.0%
1971	3,174	−3.1%
1981	3,598	+13.4%
1991	3,825	+6.3%
2001	3,713	−2.9%
2011	3,655	−1.6%
2021	3,440	−5.9%

Source: ISTAT

=== Immigration ===
As of 2025, immigrants make up 2.2% of the total population. The 5 largest foreign countries of birth are Romania, Germany, Venezuela, Cuba, and Belarus.

== Gallery ==
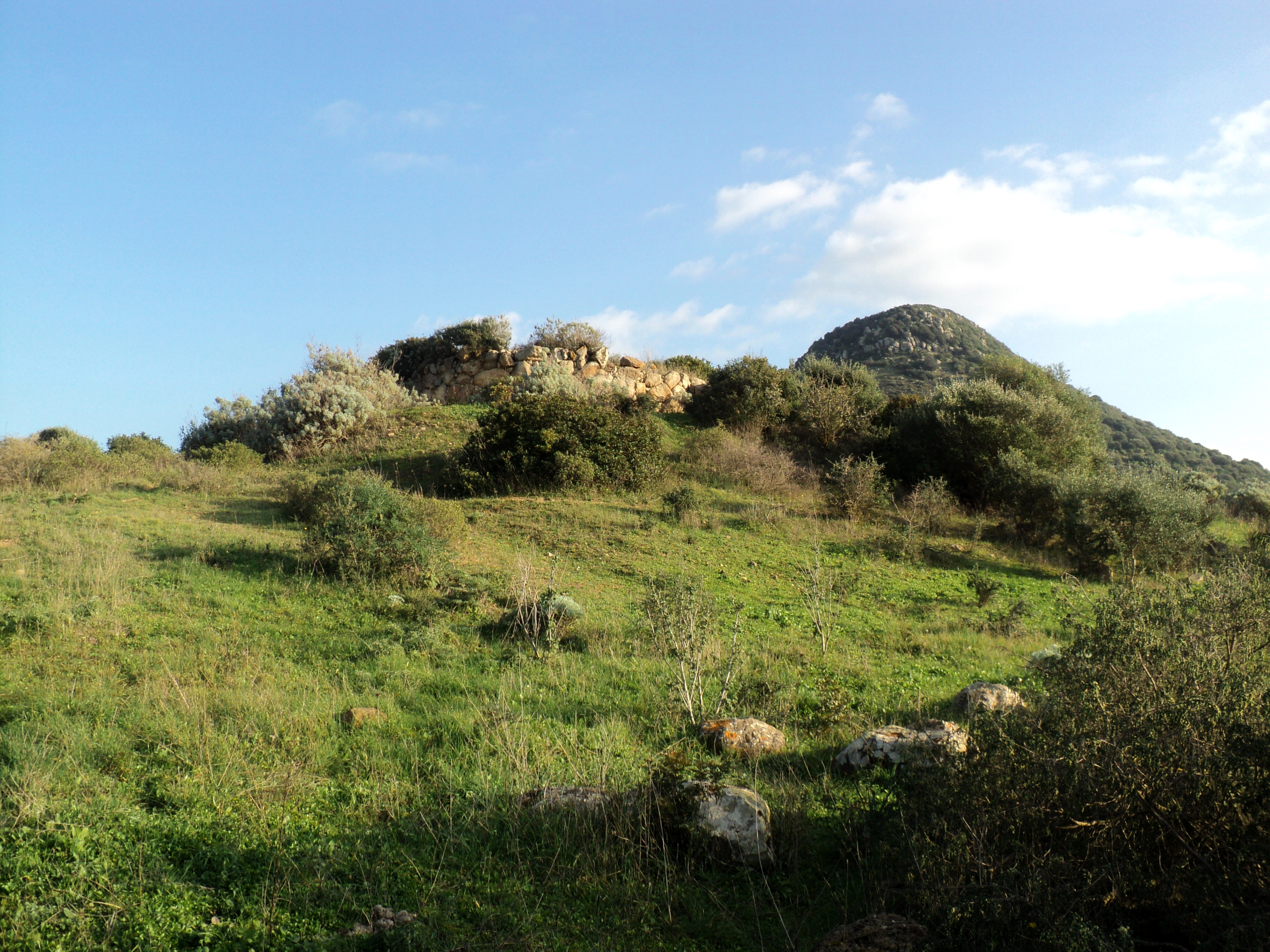
Nuraghe Santu Pauli

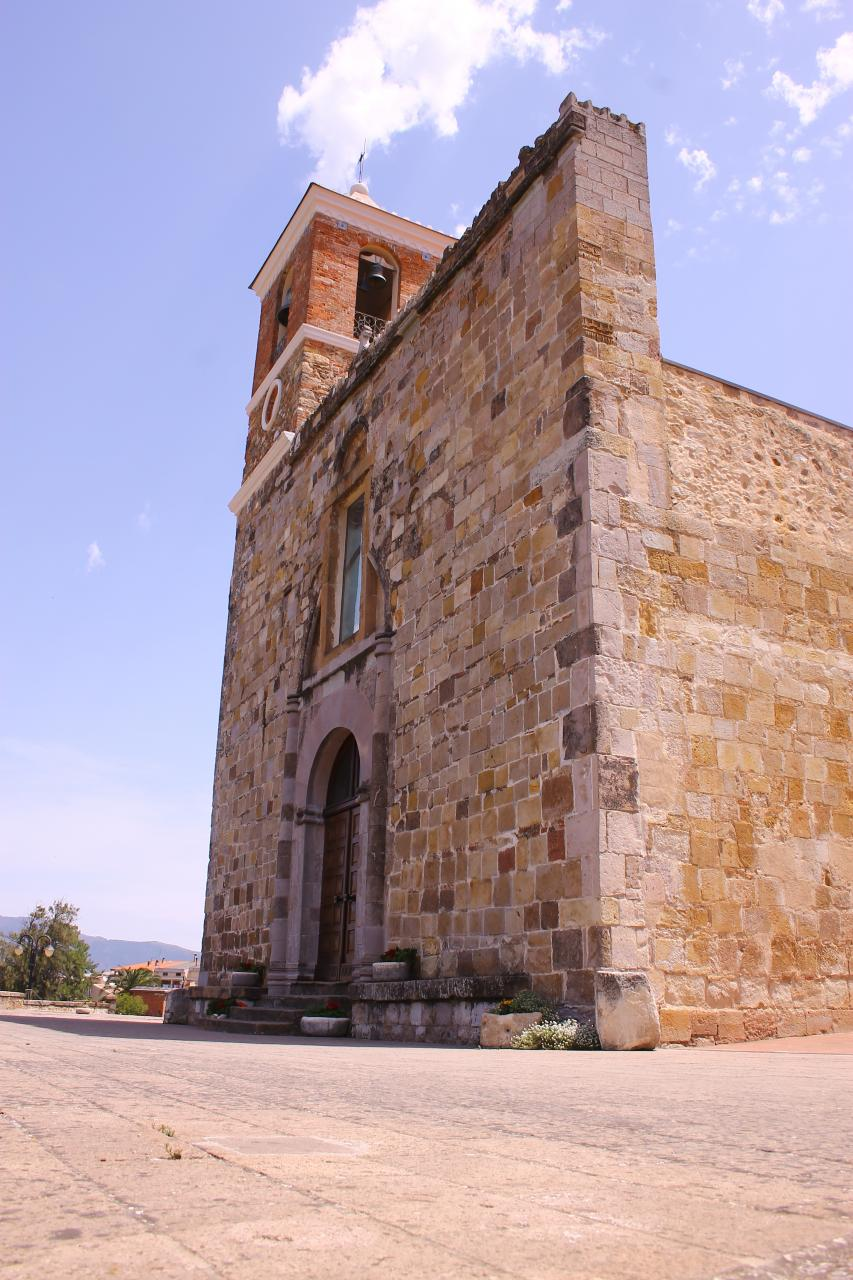
Santa Maria della Neve

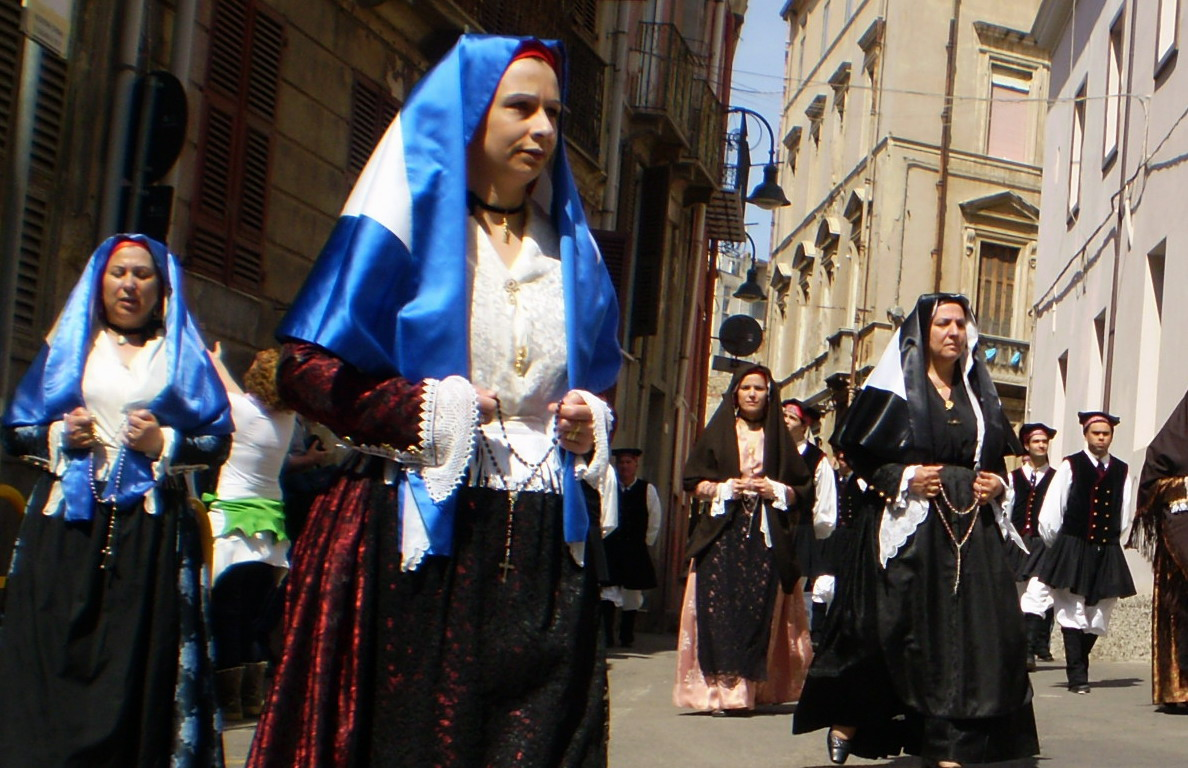
Traditional clothing of Villamassargia

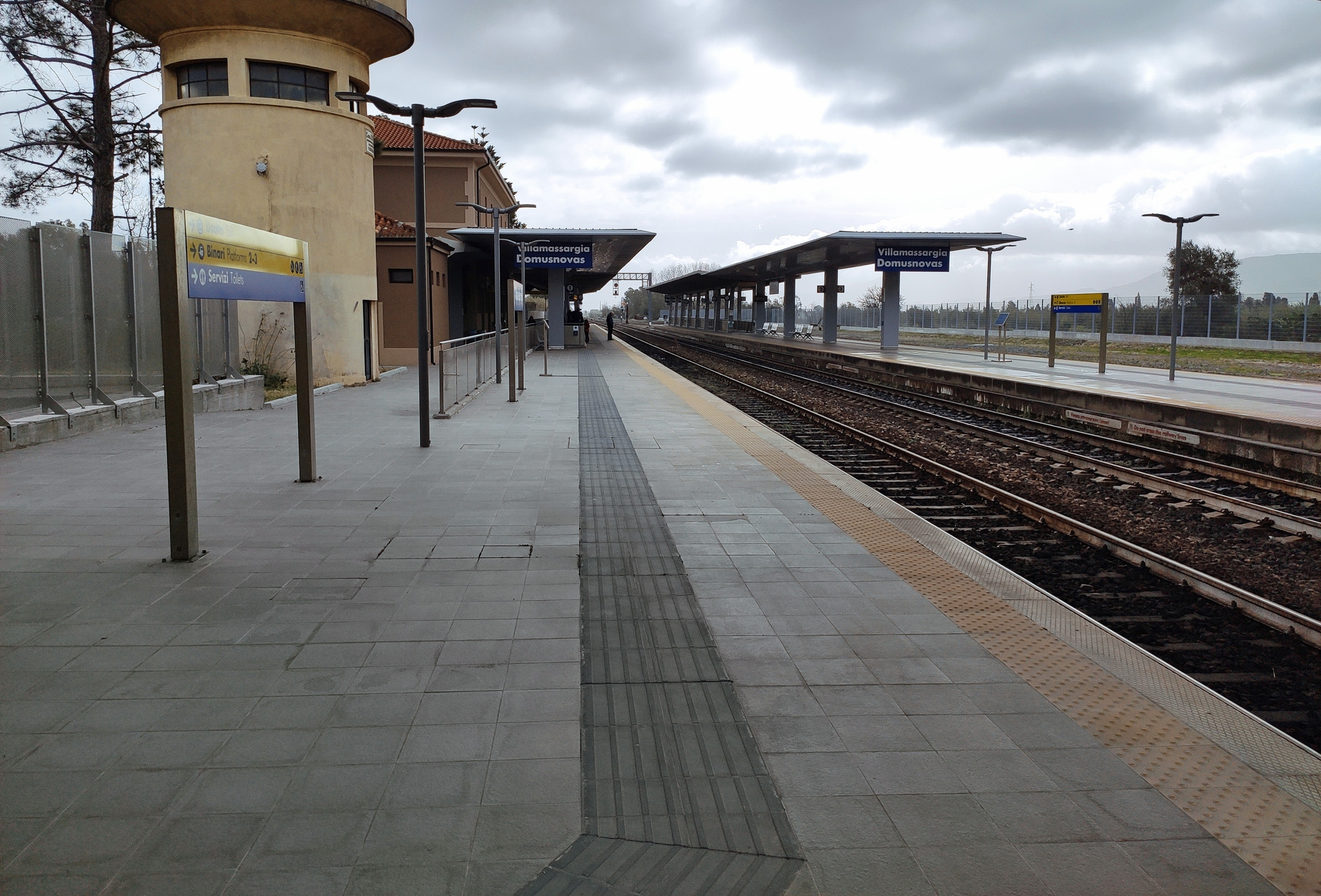
Villamassargia-Domusnovas train station

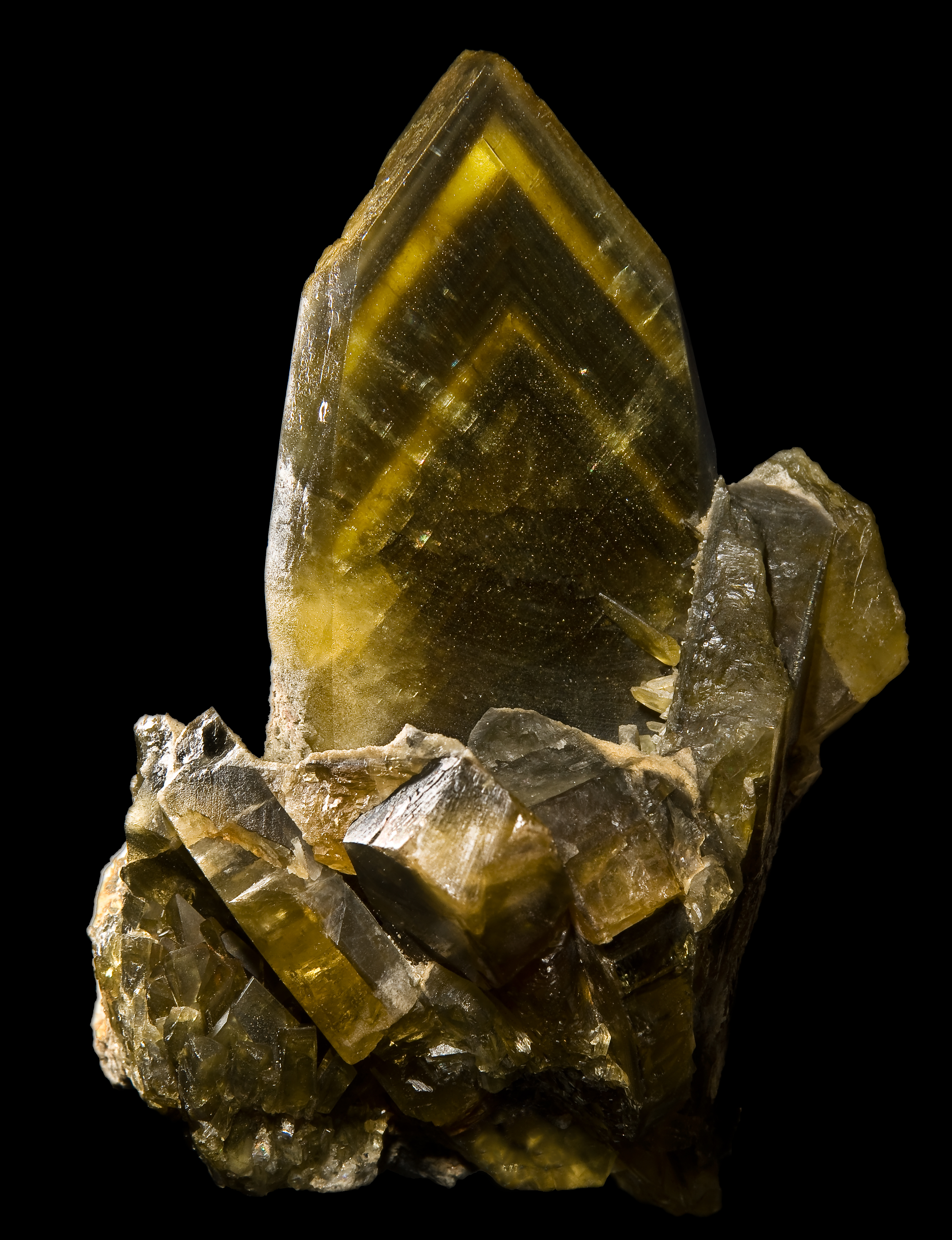
Baryte from Monte Mesu in Villamassargia
