= Province of Sulcis Iglesiente =

Province of Sulcis Iglesiente Provincia del Sulcis Iglesiente (Italian) Provìntzia de su Sulcis Igresiente (Sardinian)
- Province
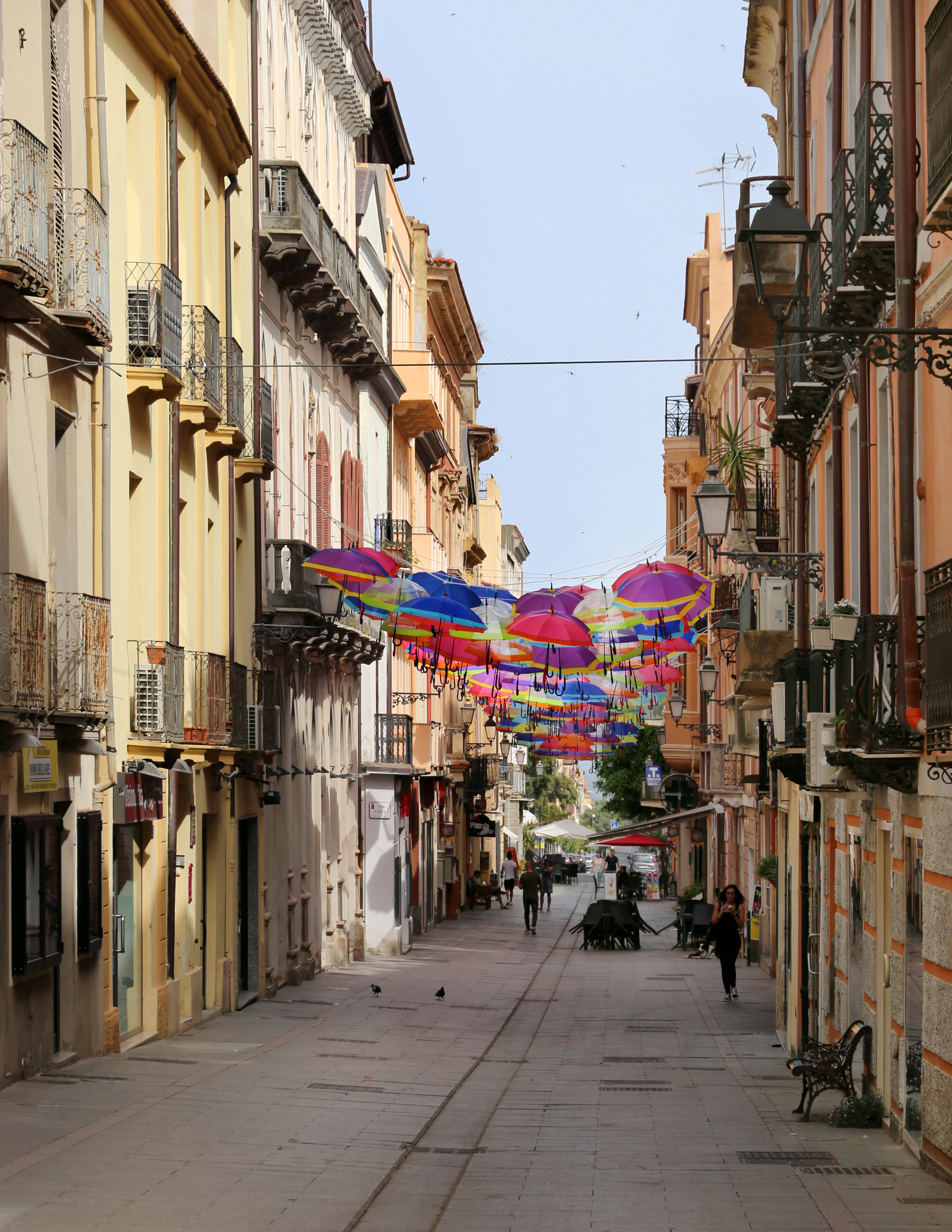
- Center of Iglesias

- Location of the Province of Sulcis Iglesiente in Italy
- Country: Italy
- Region: Sardinia
- Established: 16 April 2021
- Became operational: 1 June 2025
- Capital(s): Carbonia and Iglesias
- Municipalities: 24

Government
  - President: Mauro Usai (PD)

Area
  - Total: 1,745.90 km^{2} (674.10 sq mi)

Population (2026)
  - Total: 117,780
  - Density: 67.461/km^{2} (174.72/sq mi)
- Time zone: UTC+1 (CET)
  - Summer (DST): UTC+2 (CEST)
- Vehicle registration: SU
- ISTAT: 119
- Website: www.provincia.sulcisiglesiente.it/it

The Province of Sulcis Iglesiente (Italian: Provincia del Sulcis Iglesiente; Sardinian: Provìntzia de su Sulcis Igresiente) is a province in the autonomous island region of Sardinia in Italy. It has two capitals; Iglesias and Carbonia. The province was established on April 16, 2021 and became functional on June 1, 2025. It has 117,780 inhabitants across its 24 municipalities.

== History ==
The province of South Sardinia absorbed the province of Carbonia-Iglesias by a regional decree in 2016.

On April 12, 2021, under the Regional Council's Regional Law Nr. 7, the province was restored as the province of Sulcis Iglesiente. The province became fully functional on June 1, 2025.

== Geography ==
Facing the Sardinian Sea to the west, the province is bordered by the province of Medio Campidano to the north and the metropolitan city of Cagliari to the east and south. It has an area of 1,745.90 square kilometres (674.10 mi^{2}).

The province includes most of the historical region of Sulcis-Iglesiente, with the rest lying in the metropolitan city of Cagliari.

=== Climate ===
Climate data for Carbonia (Bacu Abis) (1981–2010)
Month	Jan	Feb	Mar	Apr	May	Jun	Jul	Aug	Sep	Oct	Nov	Dec	Year
Mean daily maximum °C (°F)	13.9 (57.0)	14.1 (57.4)	17.0 (62.6)	19.0 (66.2)	23.8 (74.8)	27.9 (82.2)	30.7 (87.3)	31.1 (88.0)	27.5 (81.5)	23.7 (74.7)	18.5 (65.3)	14.6 (58.3)	21.8 (71.3)
Daily mean °C (°F)	10.5 (50.9)	10.4 (50.7)	13.0 (55.4)	14.7 (58.5)	18.9 (66.0)	22.6 (72.7)	25.4 (77.7)	25.9 (78.6)	22.6 (72.7)	19.3 (66.7)	14.9 (58.8)	11.3 (52.3)	17.5 (63.4)
Mean daily minimum °C (°F)	7.0 (44.6)	6.7 (44.1)	8.9 (48.0)	10.3 (50.5)	13.9 (57.0)	17.3 (63.1)	20.1 (68.2)	20.6 (69.1)	17.6 (63.7)	14.8 (58.6)	11.2 (52.2)	7.9 (46.2)	13.0 (55.4)
Average precipitation mm (inches)	56.0 (2.20)	58.3 (2.30)	40.9 (1.61)	56.0 (2.20)	31.8 (1.25)	16.7 (0.66)	1.1 (0.04)	7.2 (0.28)	37.0 (1.46)	68.2 (2.69)	92.6 (3.65)	82.2 (3.24)	548 (21.58)
Source: Sistema nazionale protezione ambiente

Climate data for Iglesias (1981–2010)
Month	Jan	Feb	Mar	Apr	May	Jun	Jul	Aug	Sep	Oct	Nov	Dec	Year
Mean daily maximum °C (°F)	13.2 (55.8)	13.5 (56.3)	16.1 (61.0)	18.4 (65.1)	23.7 (74.7)	28.4 (83.1)	32.1 (89.8)	32.5 (90.5)	27.7 (81.9)	23.3 (73.9)	17.4 (63.3)	13.9 (57.0)	21.7 (71.0)
Daily mean °C (°F)	9.3 (48.7)	9.5 (49.1)	11.6 (52.9)	13.7 (56.7)	18.1 (64.6)	22.2 (72.0)	25.4 (77.7)	25.9 (78.6)	22.2 (72.0)	18.5 (65.3)	13.5 (56.3)	10.3 (50.5)	16.7 (62.0)
Mean daily minimum °C (°F)	5.4 (41.7)	5.4 (41.7)	7.0 (44.6)	8.9 (48.0)	12.4 (54.3)	15.9 (60.6)	18.6 (65.5)	19.2 (66.6)	16.6 (61.9)	13.6 (56.5)	9.6 (49.3)	6.7 (44.1)	11.6 (52.9)
Average precipitation mm (inches)	80.4 (3.17)	71.8 (2.83)	56.7 (2.23)	73.6 (2.90)	35.2 (1.39)	19.8 (0.78)	1.6 (0.06)	7.5 (0.30)	49.3 (1.94)	48.2 (1.90)	111.5 (4.39)	102.2 (4.02)	657.8 (25.91)
Source: Sistema nazionale protezione ambiente

== Government ==
The president of the province is Mauro Usai since 30 September 2025.

=== Municipalities ===
The province has 24 municipalities:

- Buggerru
- Calasetta
- Carbonia
- Carloforte
- Domusnovas
- Fluminimaggiore
- Giba
- Gonnesa
- Iglesias
- Masainas
- Musei
- Narcao
- Nuxis
- Perdaxius
- Piscinas
- Portoscuso
- San Giovanni Suergiu
- Santadi
- Sant'Anna Arresi
- Sant'Antioco
- Teulada
- Tratalias
- Villamassargia
- Villaperuccio

== Demographics ==
As of 2026, the population is 117,780, of which 49.0% are male, and 51.0% are female. Minors make up 10.4% of the population, and seniors make up 32.7%.

Historical population

Year	Pop.	±%
1861	36,286	—
1871	41,793	+15.2%
1881	49,730	+19.0%
1901	71,891	+44.6%
1911	74,960	+4.3%
1921	74,587	−0.5%
1931	84,572	+13.4%
1936	83,728	−1.0%

Year	Pop.	±%
1951	142,691	+70.4%
1961	141,544	−0.8%
1971	133,700	−5.5%
1981	141,164	+5.6%
1991	144,369	+2.3%
2001	135,878	−5.9%
2011	132,313	−2.6%
2021	122,386	−7.5%

Source: ISTAT

=== Immigration ===
As of 2025, the foreign-born population is 3,687, making up 3.1% of the total population.
