= Nuxis =

- Comune
- Comune di Nuxis
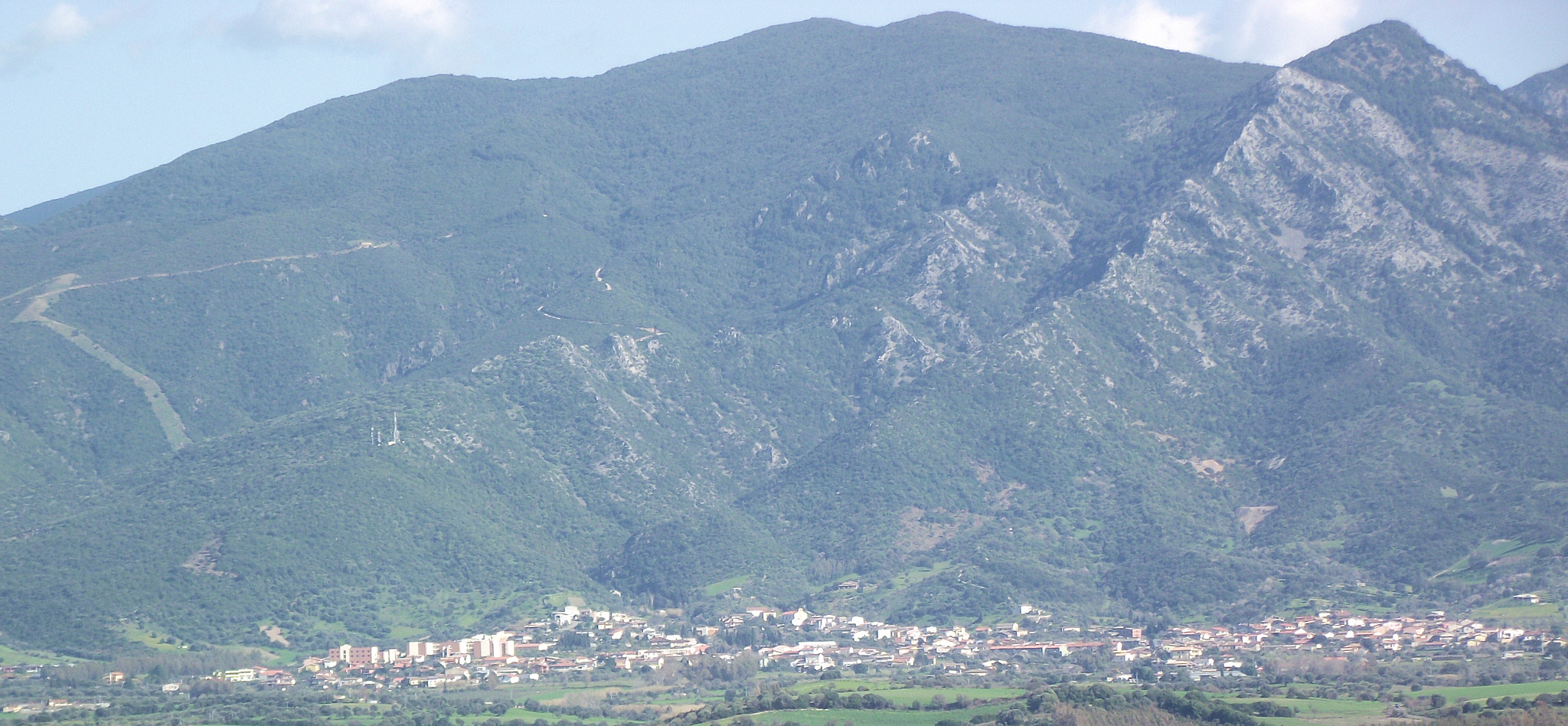
- View of Nuxis and Monte Is Caravius

- Location within Sardinia
- Coordinates: 39°9′N 8°44′E
- Country: Italy
- Region: Sardinia
- Province: Sulcis Iglesiente

Government
  - Mayor: Piero Andrea Deias

Area
  - Total: 61.59 km^{2} (23.78 sq mi)
- Elevation: 196 m (643 ft)

Population (2026)
  - Total: 1,382
  - Density: 22.44/km^{2} (58.12/sq mi)
- Demonym: Nusciai
- Time zone: UTC+1 (CET)
  - Summer (DST): UTC+2 (CEST)
- Postal code: 09010
- Dialing code: 0781
- Website: Official website

Nuxis (Sardinian: [ˈnuʒizi], Italian: [ˈnuːʒis]) is a town and comune (municipality) in the Province of Sulcis Iglesiente in the autonomous island region of Sardinia in Italy, located about 35 kilometres (22 mi) west of Cagliari and about 20 kilometres (12 mi) east of Carbonia. It has 1,382 inhabitants.

Nuxis borders the municipalities of Assemini, Narcao, Santadi, Siliqua, and Villaperuccio.

== History ==
The village was founded around the year 1000 AD, though there is archaeological evidence of a nuragic settlement, and grew out of a farm settlement. Nuxis' pastoral settlement was aided by the presence of Benedictine monks in nearby Narcao and Flumentepido.

== Demographics ==
As of 2026, the population is 1,382, of which 48.7% are male, and 51.3% are female. Minors make up 9.6% of the population, and seniors make up 34.4%.

Historical population

Year	Pop.	±%
1861	1,358	—
1871	1,426	+5.0%
1881	1,490	+4.5%
1901	1,537	+3.2%
1911	1,676	+9.0%
1921	1,574	−6.1%
1931	1,747	+11.0%
1936	1,799	+3.0%

Year	Pop.	±%
1951	2,187	+21.6%
1961	1,998	−8.6%
1971	1,808	−9.5%
1981	1,848	+2.2%
1991	1,834	−0.8%
2001	1,703	−7.1%
2011	1,631	−4.2%
2021	1,455	−10.8%

Source: ISTAT

=== Immigration ===
As of 2025, immigrants make up 2.9% of the total population. The 5 largest foreign countries of birth are Morocco, Germany, France, Belgium, and Nigeria.

== Main sights ==
The small church, of area less than 100 square metres (1,100 ft^{2}), of Sant'Elia di Tattinu, located approximately 250 metres (820 ft) south of the village is an example of Byzantine architecture in Sardinia.
