= Musei =

- Comune
- Comune di Musei
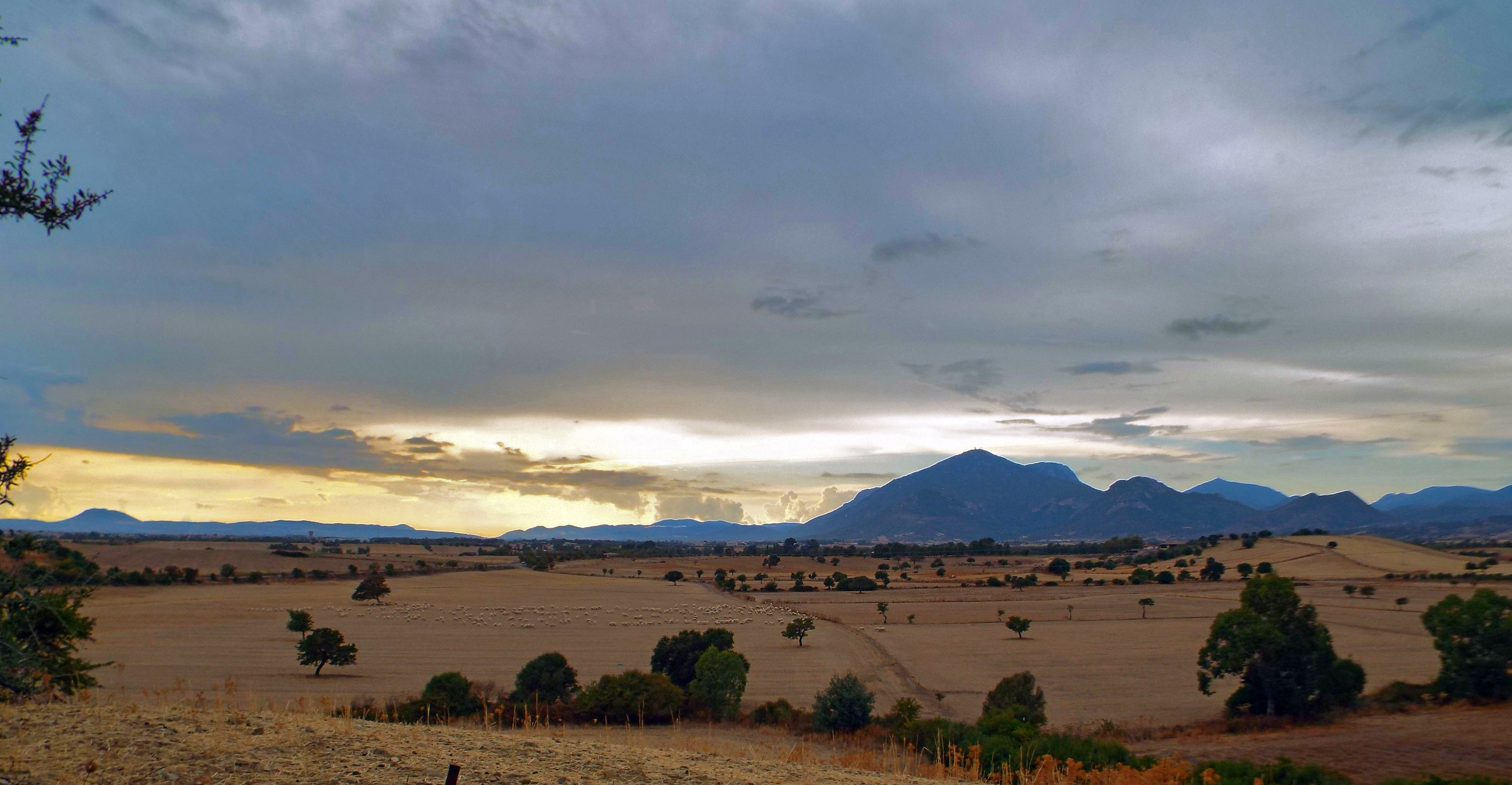
- Countryside in the municipality of Musei

- Location within Sardinia
- Coordinates: 39°18′N 8°40′E
- Country: Italy
- Region: Sardinia
- Province: Sulcis Iglesiente

Area
  - Total: 20.27 km^{2} (7.83 sq mi)
- Elevation: 117 m (384 ft)

Population (2026)
  - Total: 1,512
  - Density: 74.59/km^{2} (193.2/sq mi)
- Demonym: Museghesi
- Time zone: UTC+1 (CET)
  - Summer (DST): UTC+2 (CEST)
- Postal code: 09010
- Dialing code: 0781

Musei is a town and comune (municipality) in the Province of Sulcis Iglesiente in the autonomous island region of Sardinia in Italy, located about 40 kilometres (25 mi) west of Cagliari and about 20 kilometres (12 mi) northeast of Carbonia. It has 1,512 inhabitants.

Musei borders the municipalities of Domusnovas, Iglesias, Siliqua, and Villamassargia.

== Demographics ==
As of 2026, the population is 1,512, of which 51.0% are male, and 49.0% are female. Minors make up 13.2% of the population, and seniors make up 27.9%.

Historical population

Year	Pop.	±%
1861	637	—
1871	670	+5.2%
1881	697	+4.0%
1901	711	+2.0%
1911	700	−1.5%
1921	801	+14.4%
1931	806	+0.6%
1936	878	+8.9%

Year	Pop.	±%
1951	1,188	+35.3%
1961	1,326	+11.6%
1971	1,257	−5.2%
1981	1,304	+3.7%
1991	1,451	+11.3%
2001	1,506	+3.8%
2011	1,522	+1.1%
2021	1,512	−0.7%

Source: ISTAT

=== Immigration ===
As of 2025, immigrants make up 1.6% of the total population. The 5 largest foreign countries of birth are Morocco, the United States, India, Senegal, and Belgium.
