= Tratalias =

- Comune
- Comune di Tratalias
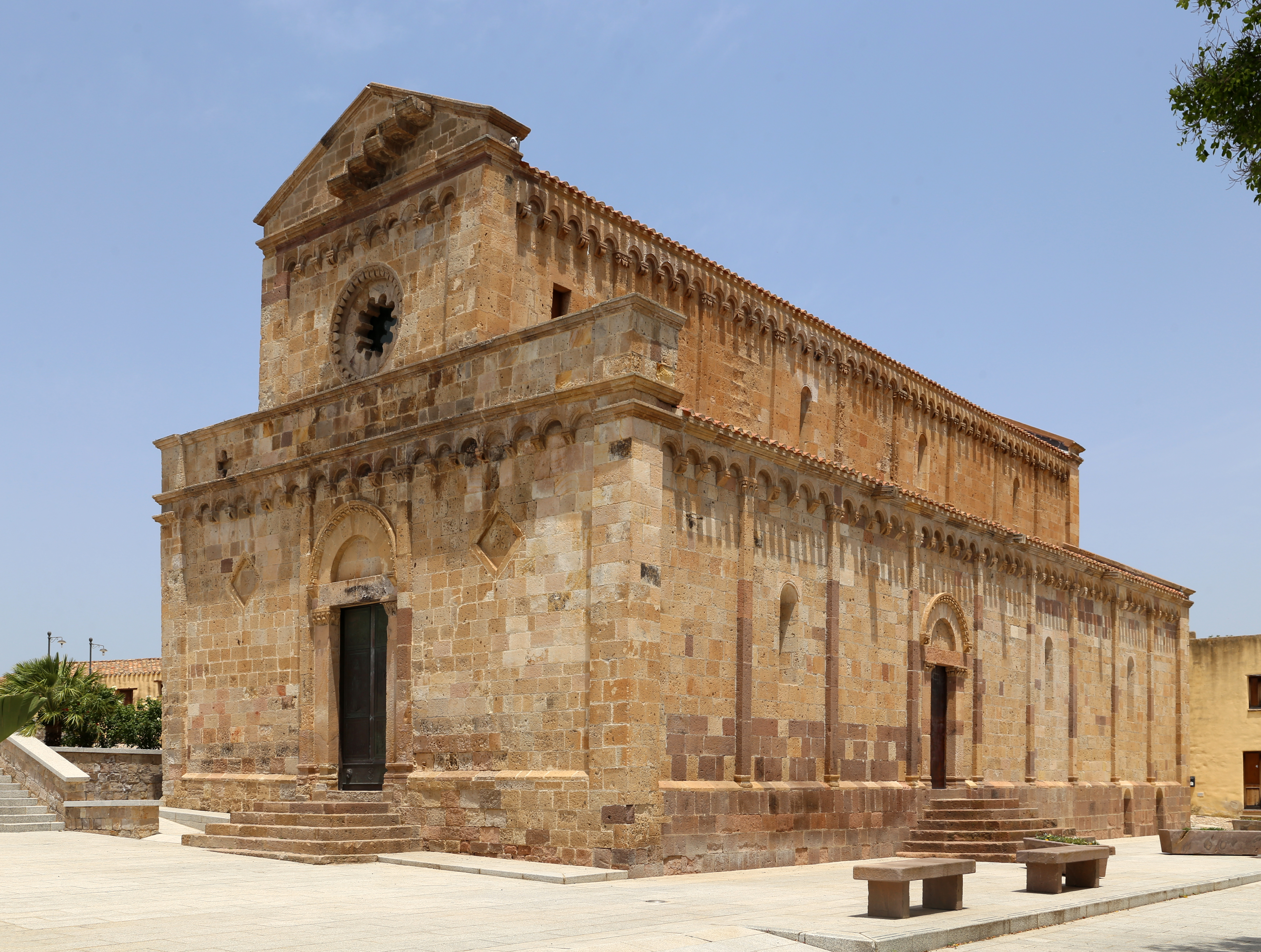
- Cathedral of Santa Maria di Monserrato

- Coat of arms

- Location within Sardinia
- Coordinates: 39°6′N 8°35′E
- Country: Italy
- Region: Sardinia
- Province: Sulcis Iglesiente

Government
  - Mayor: Emanuele Pes

Area
  - Total: 31.00 km^{2} (11.97 sq mi)
- Elevation: 17 m (56 ft)

Population (2026)
  - Total: 988
  - Density: 31.9/km^{2} (82.5/sq mi)
- Time zone: UTC+1 (CET)
  - Summer (DST): UTC+2 (CEST)
- Postal code: 09010
- Dialing code: 0781
- Website: Official website

Tratalias is a town and comune (municipality) in the Province of Sulcis Iglesiente in the autonomous island region of Sardinia in Italy, located about 50 kilometres (31 mi) southwest of Cagliari and about 8 kilometres (5 mi) southeast of Carbonia. It has 988 inhabitants.

Tratalias borders the municipalities of Carbonia, Giba, Perdaxius, Piscinas, San Giovanni Suergiu, and Villaperuccio.

== Demographics ==
As of 2026, the population is 988, of which 51.3% are male, and 48.7% are female. Minors make up 9.3% of the population, and seniors make up 32.4%.

Historical population

Year	Pop.	±%
1861	987	—
1871	1,062	+7.6%
1881	996	−6.2%
1901	954	−4.2%
1911	1,050	+10.1%
1921	1,074	+2.3%
1931	1,151	+7.2%
1936	1,246	+8.3%

Year	Pop.	±%
1951	1,520	+22.0%
1961	1,378	−9.3%
1971	1,064	−22.8%
1981	1,077	+1.2%
1991	1,189	+10.4%
2001	1,121	−5.7%
2011	1,107	−1.2%
2021	1,020	−7.9%

Source: ISTAT

=== Immigration ===
As of 2025, immigrants make up 2.6% of the total population. The 5 largest foreign countries of birth are Romania, Germany, France, Kyrgyzstan, and Poland.

== Sights ==
The former cathedral of Santa Maria di Monserrato is an example of Sardinian Romanesque architecture. Built in 1213–82, it has a façade with two rows of Lombard bands and a rose window. The interior has a rectangular plan with a nave and two aisles, and a semicircular apse.
