= Perdaxius =

- Comune
- Comune di Perdaxius
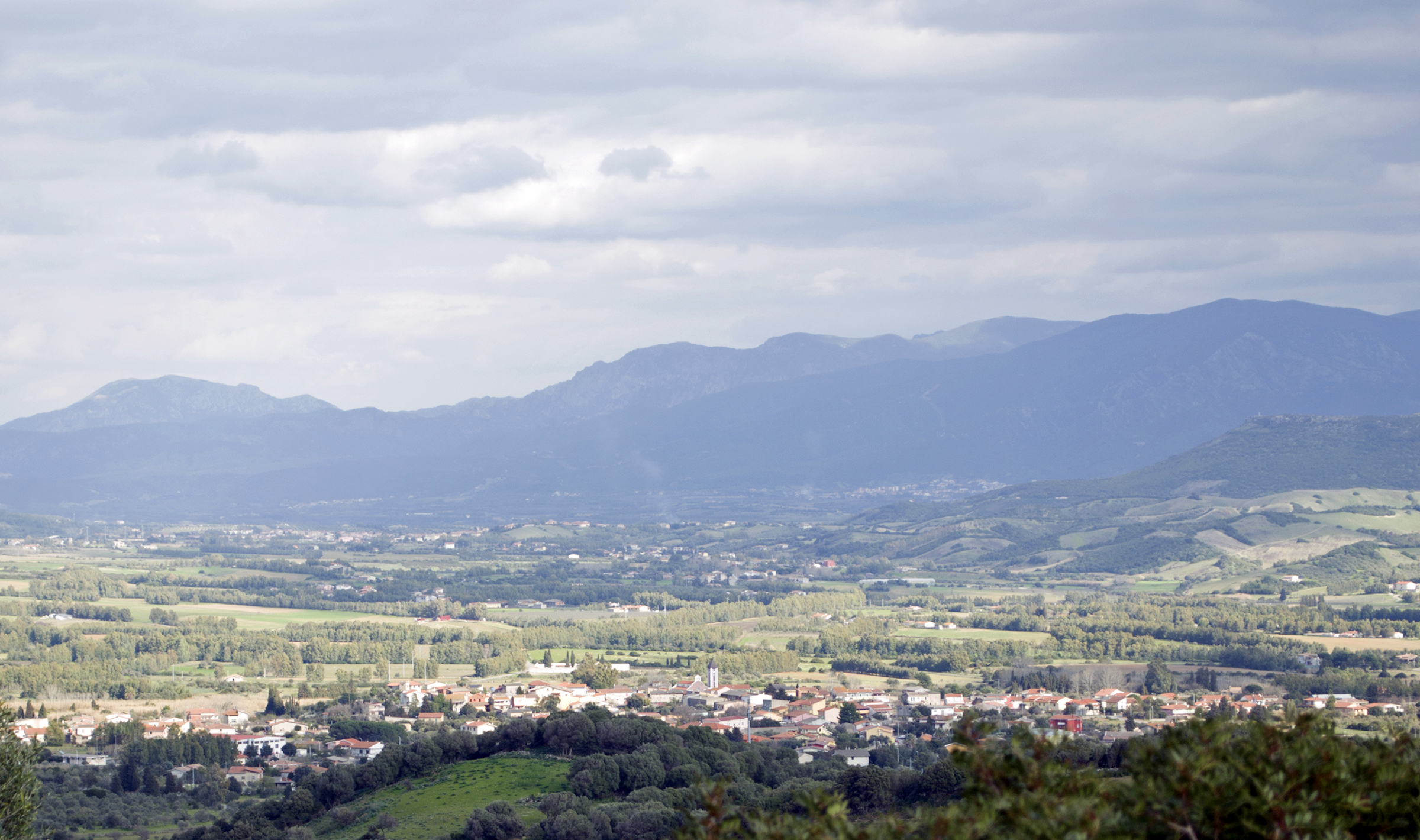
- View of Perdaxius

- Location within Sardinia
- Coordinates: 39°10′N 8°37′E
- Country: Italy
- Region: Sardinia
- Province: Sulcis Iglesiente

Area
  - Total: 29.50 km^{2} (11.39 sq mi)

Population (2026)
  - Total: 1,276
  - Density: 43.25/km^{2} (112.0/sq mi)
- Time zone: UTC+1 (CET)
  - Summer (DST): UTC+2 (CEST)
- Postal code: 09010
- Dialing code: 0781

Perdaxius (Sardinian: [pɛɾˈdaʒuzu], Italian: [perˈdaːʒus]; also spelled Perdaxus in Sardinian) is a town and comune (municipality) in the Province of Sulcis Iglesiente in the autonomous island region of Sardinia in Italy, located about 45 kilometres (28 mi) west of Cagliari and about 9 kilometres (6 mi) east of Carbonia. It has 1,276 inhabitants.

Perdaxius borders the municipalities of Carbonia, Narcao, Tratalias, and Villaperuccio.

== Demographics ==
As of 2026, the population is 1,276, of which 50.1% are male, and 49.9% are female. Minors make up 11.4% of the population, and seniors make up 32.4%.

Historical population

Year	Pop.	±%
1861	579	—
1871	538	−7.1%
1881	657	+22.1%
1901	674	+2.6%
1911	833	+23.6%
1921	878	+5.4%
1931	823	−6.3%
1936	842	+2.3%

Year	Pop.	±%
1951	1,211	+43.8%
1961	1,677	+38.5%
1971	1,427	−14.9%
1981	1,477	+3.5%
1991	1,516	+2.6%
2001	1,465	−3.4%
2011	1,475	+0.7%
2021	1,326	−10.1%

Source: ISTAT

=== Immigration ===
As of 2025, immigrants make up 2.3% of the total population. The 5 largest foreign countries of birth are Germany, the Netherlands, France, Switzerland, and Ukraine.
