= San Giovanni Suergiu =

San Giovanni Suergiu Santu Giuanni de Suergiu (Sardinian)
- Comune
- Comune di San Giovanni Suergiu
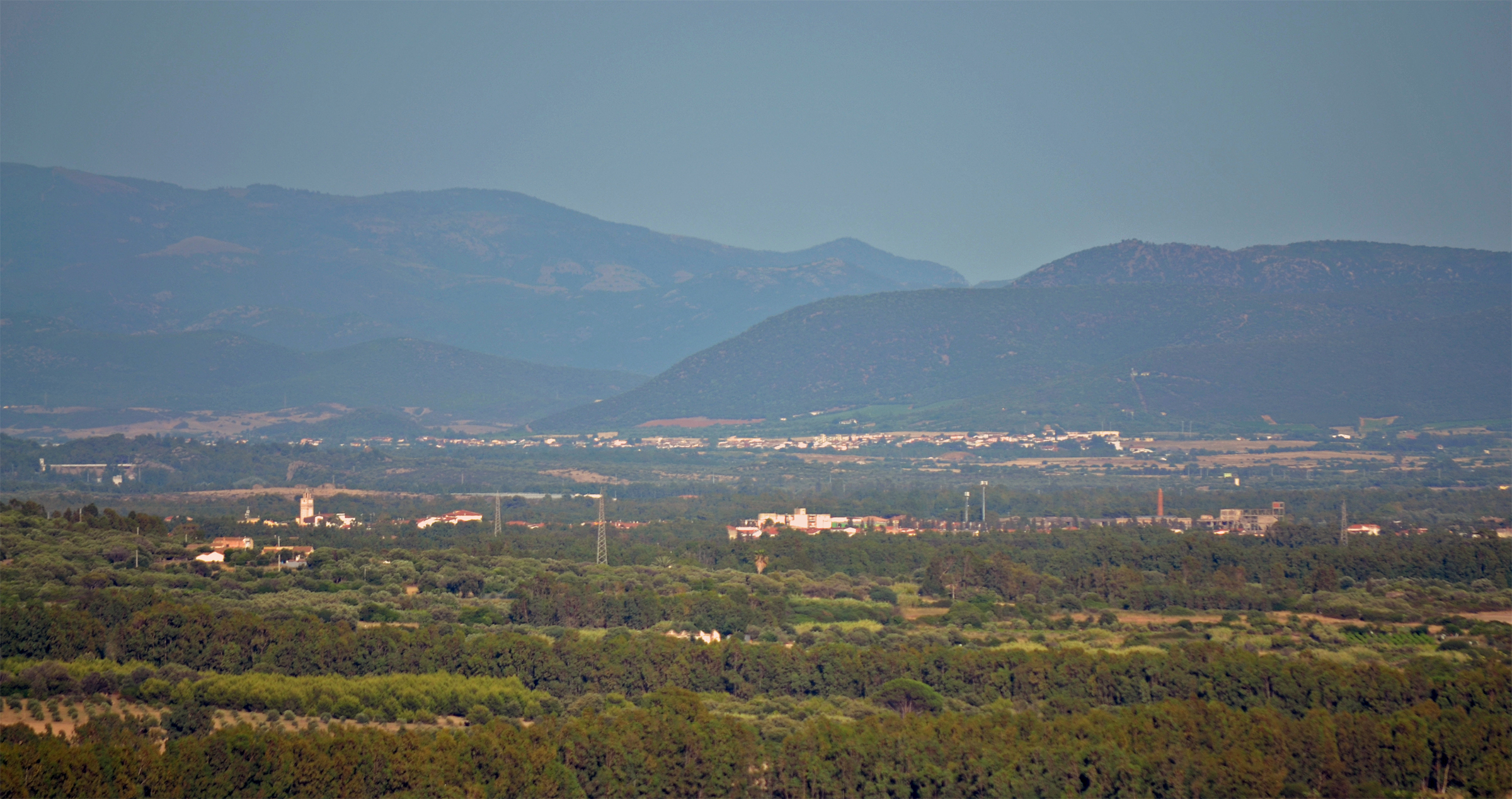
- View of San Giovanni Suergiu

- Coat of arms

- Location within Sardinia
- Coordinates: 39°7′N 8°31′E
- Country: Italy
- Region: Sardinia
- Province: Sulcis Iglesiente
- Frazioni: is Urigus, is Loccis, Palmas, Matzaccara, is Loccis Santus, is Cordeddas, Funtannona

Government
  - Mayor: Elvira Usai

Area
  - Total: 72.37 km^{2} (27.94 sq mi)
- Elevation: 16 m (52 ft)

Population (2026)
  - Total: 5,523
  - Density: 76.32/km^{2} (197.7/sq mi)
- Demonym: Sangiovannesi or Santuannesus
- Time zone: UTC+1 (CET)
  - Summer (DST): UTC+2 (CEST)
- Postal code: 09010
- Dialing code: 0781
- Patron saint: St. John the Baptist
- Saint day: 24 June
- Website: Official website

San Giovanni Suergiu (Sardinian: Santu Giuanni de Suergiu) is a town and comune (municipality) in the Province of Sulcis Iglesiente in the autonomous island region of Sardinia in Italy, located about 50 kilometres (31 mi) west of Cagliari, and about 4 kilometres (2 mi) south of Carbonia. It has 5,523 inhabitants.

San Giovanni Suergiu borders the municipalities of Carbonia, Giba, Portoscuso, Sant'Antioco, and Tratalias.

== Demographics ==
As of 2026, the population is 5,523, of which 50.0% are male, and 50.0% are female. Minors make up 10.9% of the population, and seniors make up 33.1%.

Historical population

Year	Pop.	±%
1861	1,206	—
1871	1,310	+8.6%
1881	1,519	+16.0%
1901	1,555	+2.4%
1911	1,644	+5.7%
1921	1,836	+11.7%
1931	2,191	+19.3%
1936	2,652	+21.0%

Year	Pop.	±%
1951	4,308	+62.4%
1961	5,353	+24.3%
1971	5,043	−5.8%
1981	5,711	+13.2%
1991	6,342	+11.0%
2001	6,116	−3.6%
2011	6,020	−1.6%
2021	5,689	−5.5%

Source: ISTAT

=== Immigration ===
As of 2025, immigrants make up 2.4% of the total population. The 5 largest foreign countries of birth are France, Germany, Morocco, Romania, and Switzerland.

== Main sights ==
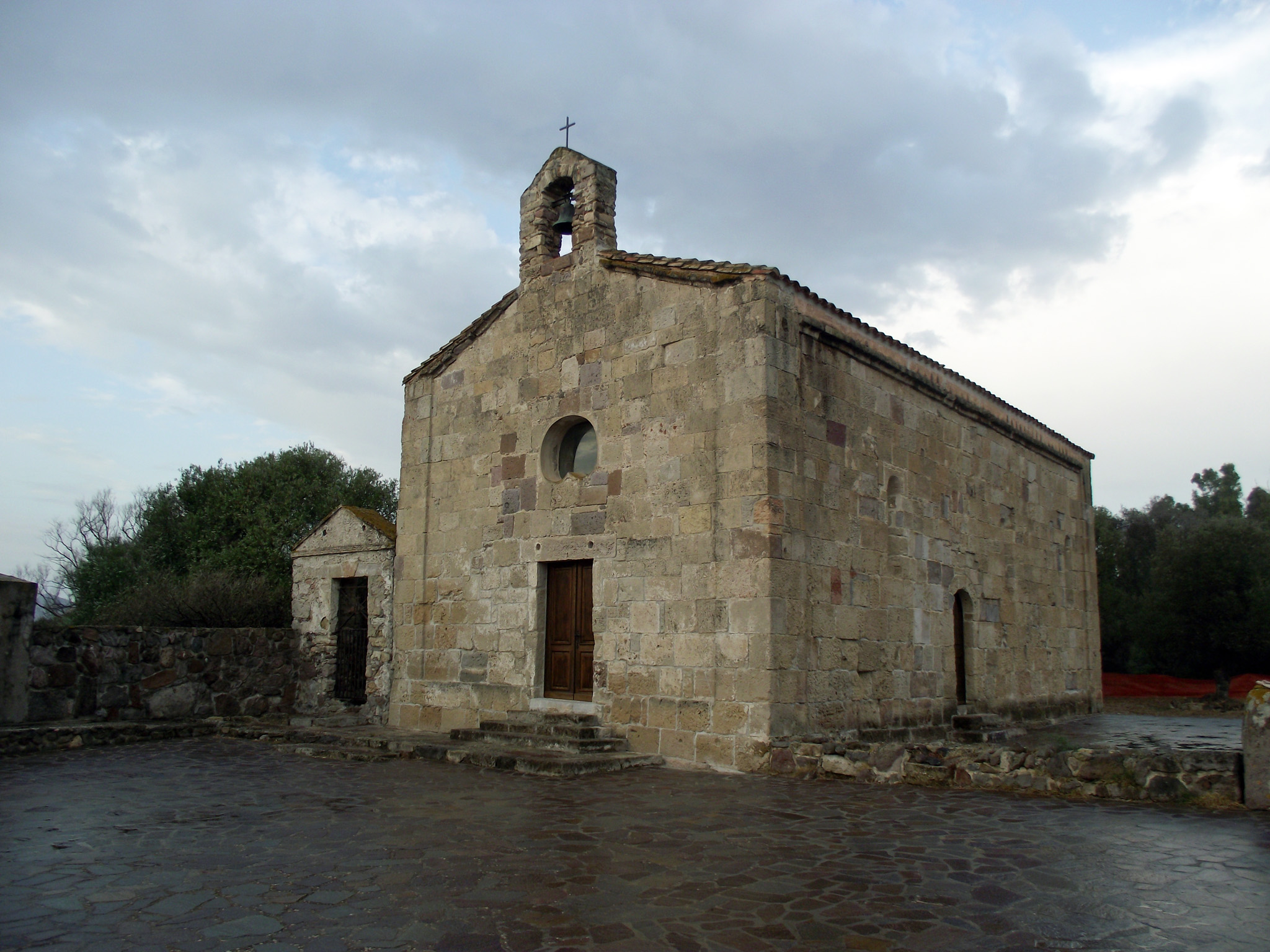
Church of St. Mary of Palmas

- Church of St. Mary of Palmas, in Pisan-Romanesque style (12th century)
- Church of St. John the Baptist (14th century)
- Remains of the Castle of Palmas (11th century)
- Necropolis of Is Locci-Santus, belonging to the Ozieri culture and including 13 domus de janas
- Several nuraghe and the giants' grave of Craminalana
- Natural preserve of Punt'e Trettu
