= Sant'Anna Arresi =

Sant'Anna Arresi Arresi (Sardinian)
- Comune
- Comune di Sant'Anna Arresi
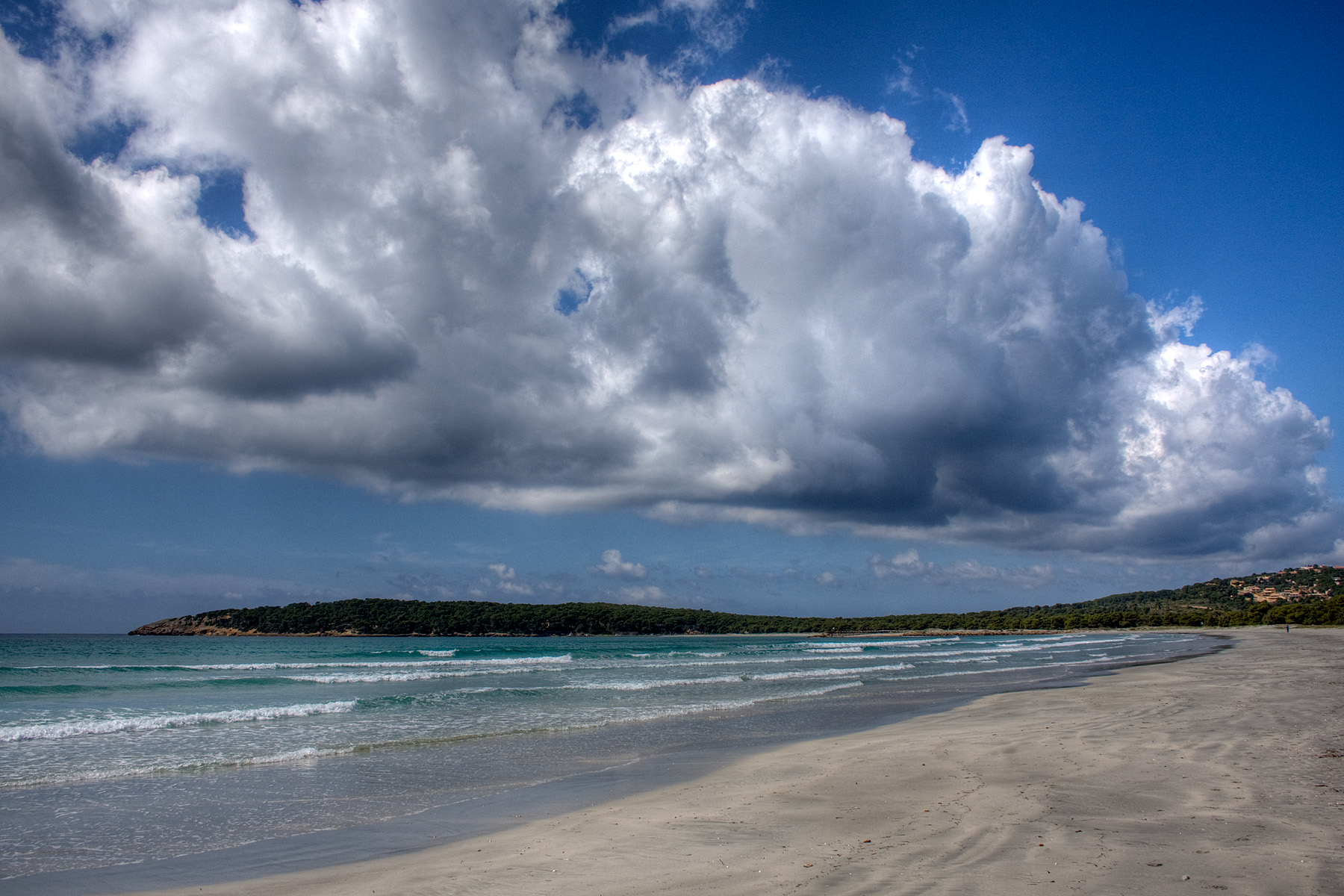
- Porto Pino

- Location within Sardinia
- Coordinates: 39°0′14″N 8°38′34″E
- Country: Italy
- Region: Sardinia
- Province: Sulcis Iglesiente
- Frazioni: Porto Pino, Is Pillonis, Is Cinus

Government
  - Mayor: Teresa Pintus

Area
  - Total: 36.68 km^{2} (14.16 sq mi)
- Elevation: 77 m (253 ft)

Population (2026)
  - Total: 2,626
  - Density: 71.59/km^{2} (185.4/sq mi)
- Demonym: Arresini
- Time zone: UTC+1 (CET)
  - Summer (DST): UTC+2 (CEST)
- Postal code: 09010
- Dialing code: 0781
- Patron saint: St. Anne
- Saint day: 26 July
- Website: Official website

Sant'Anna Arresi (Sardinian: Arresi) is a town and comune (municipality) in the Province of Sulcis Iglesiente in the autonomous island region of Sardinia in Italy, located about 45 kilometres (28 mi) southwest of Cagliari and about 20 kilometres (12 mi) southeast of Carbonia. It has 2,626 inhabitants.

Sant'Anna Arresi borders the municipalities of Masainas and Teulada.

== Demographics ==
As of 2026, the population is 2,626, of which 50.6% are male, and 49.4% are female. Minors make up 10.3% of the population, and seniors make up 32.9%.

Historical population

Year	Pop.	±%
1861	501	—
1871	511	+2.0%
1881	533	+4.3%
1901	703	+31.9%
1911	779	+10.8%
1921	867	+11.3%
1931	1,030	+18.8%
1936	1,213	+17.8%

Year	Pop.	±%
1951	1,607	+32.5%
1961	1,890	+17.6%
1971	2,013	+6.5%
1981	2,304	+14.5%
1991	2,516	+9.2%
2001	2,583	+2.7%
2011	2,712	+5.0%
2021	2,663	−1.8%

Source: ISTAT

=== Immigration ===
As of 2025, immigrants make up 4.8% of the total population. The 5 largest foreign countries of birth are Germany, Romania, France, Russia, and the United Kingdom.

== Main sights ==
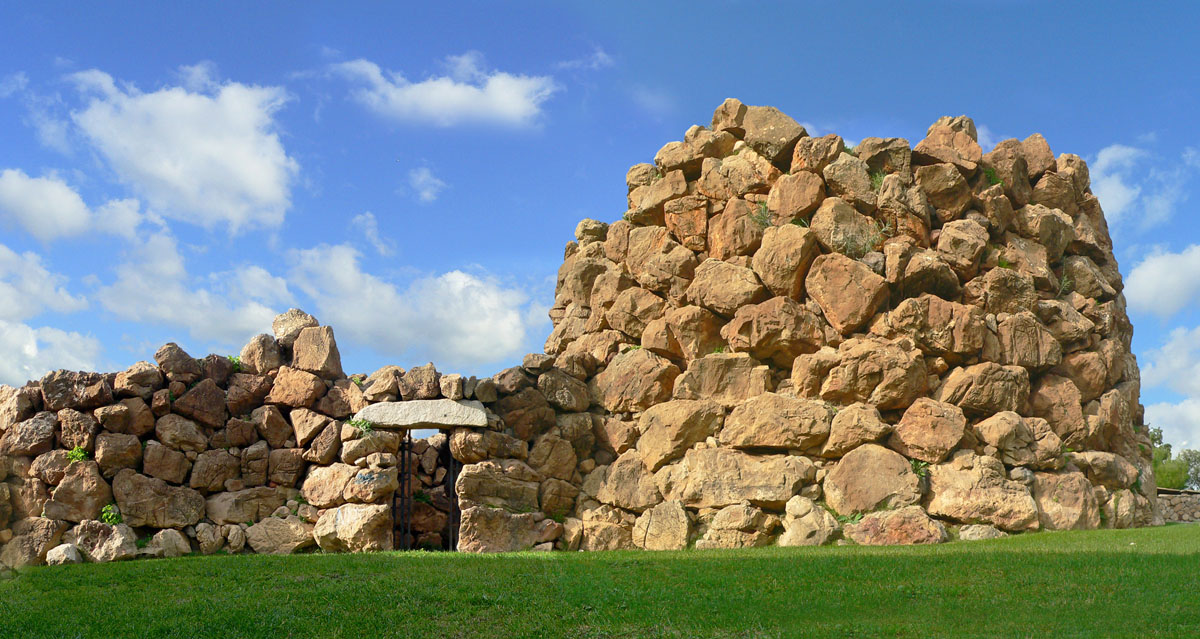
Nuraghe Arresi

The frazione of Porto Pino has a spotless beach that stretches for almost 2 kilometres (1.2 mi) with dunes that can reach as high as 29 metres (95 ft). As its name suggests, the importance of this area from a naturalistic point of view comes from the presence of the Aleppo pine, which is present in a dense wood of about 90 hectares (220 acres). As well as the pines, squat and Phoenician juniper can be found all around. There are also rare kermes oaks, which, in their bushy state, are found only in very few places on the island.

The wetland at the back of the beach is home to numerous species of birds, including cormorants, green cormorants and shags.

== Culture ==
Ai confini tra Sardegna e Jazz is an international music festival. It is held in the first week of August/first week of September.
