= Domusnovas =

Domusnovas Domunòas (Sardinian)
- Comune
- Comune di Domusnovas
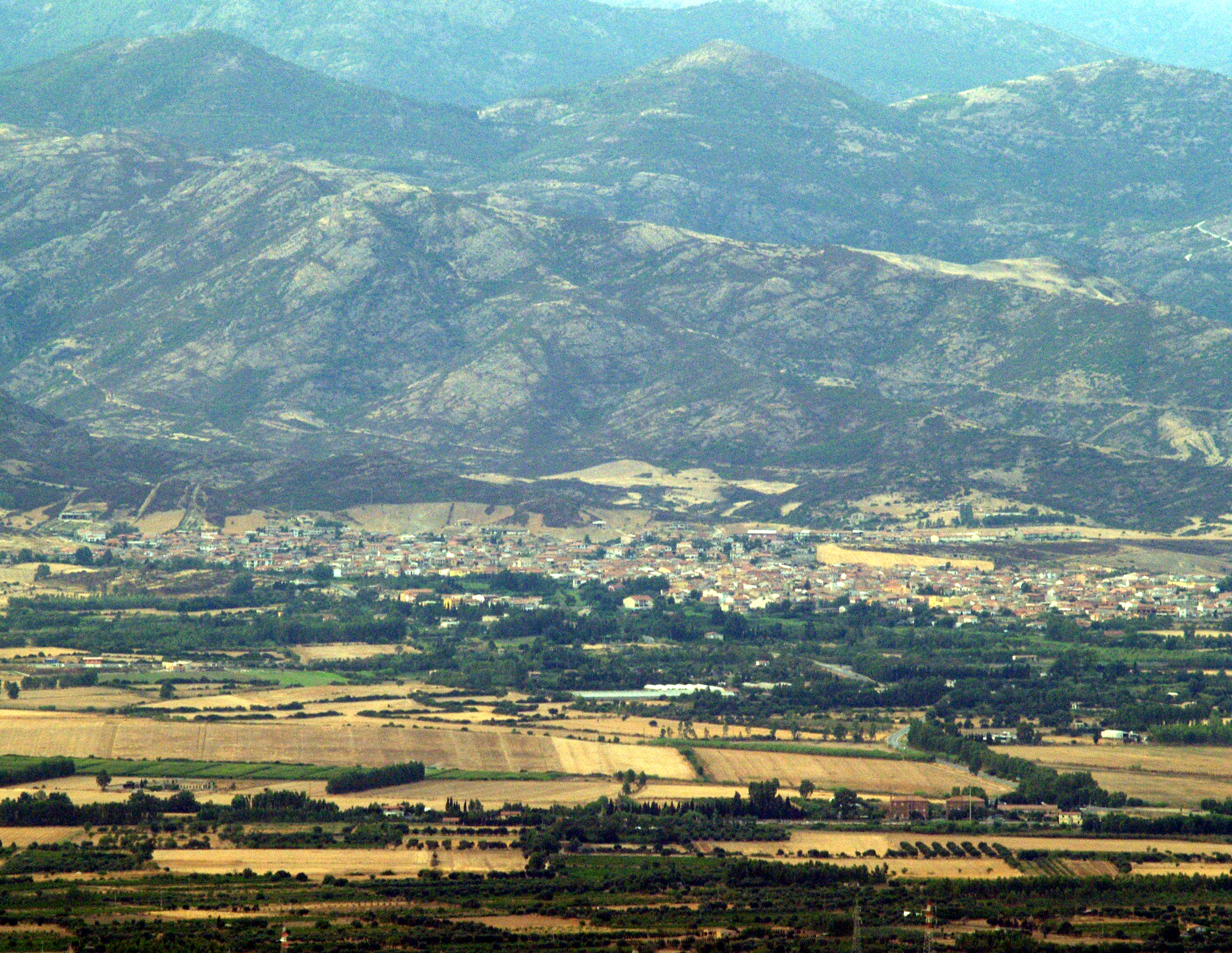

- Coat of arms

- Location within Sardinia
- Coordinates: 39°19′N 8°39′E
- Country: Italy
- Region: Sardinia
- Province: Sulcis Iglesiente

Government
  - Mayor: Isangela Mascia

Area
  - Total: 80.59 km^{2} (31.12 sq mi)
- Elevation: 152 m (499 ft)

Population (2026)
  - Total: 5,694
  - Density: 70.65/km^{2} (183.0/sq mi)
- Demonym: Domusnovesi
- Time zone: UTC+1 (CET)
  - Summer (DST): UTC+2 (CEST)
- Postal code: 09015
- Dialing code: 0781
- ISTAT code: 111016
- Website: Official website

Domusnovas (Sardinian: Domunòas) is a town and comune (municipality) in the Province of Sulcis Iglesiente in the autonomous island region of Sardinia in Italy, located about 40 kilometres (25 mi) northwest of Cagliari and about 20 kilometres (12 mi) northeast of Carbonia, in the Sulcis-Iglesiente region, in the valley of the Cixerri river. It has 5,694 inhabitants.

Domusnovas borders the municipalities of Fluminimaggiore, Gonnosfanadiga, Iglesias, Musei, Villacidro, and Villamassargia.

The town is known for the Grottoes of San Giovanni, located some 2 kilometres (1 mi) from the town.

== History ==
The area of Domusnovas was inhabited since prehistoric times, as attested by the presence of Neolithic walls (demolished in the 19th century) and several nuraghe. During the Roman domination of the island it was a village across the Cagliari-Sulcis road, used to trade the ore extracted in the nearby Metalla.

In the Middle Ages, it was part of the giudicato of Cagliari, and, when in 1257 the latter was conquered by Pisan troops, it became a fief of count Ugolino della Gherardesca. In 1324, it was occupied by the Aragonese.

== Demographics ==
As of 2026, the population is 5,694, of which 49.4% are male, and 50.6% are female. Minors make up 10.6% of the population, and seniors make up 30.1%.

Historical population

Year	Pop.	±%
1861	2,042	—
1871	2,583	+26.5%
1881	2,503	−3.1%
1901	3,013	+20.4%
1911	2,957	−1.9%
1921	3,448	+16.6%
1931	3,630	+5.3%
1936	3,483	−4.0%

Year	Pop.	±%
1951	4,839	+38.9%
1961	5,773	+19.3%
1971	5,601	−3.0%
1981	6,117	+9.2%
1991	6,926	+13.2%
2001	6,582	−5.0%
2011	6,416	−2.5%
2021	5,922	−7.7%

Source: ISTAT

=== Immigration ===
As of 2025, immigrants make up 1.7% of the total population. The 5 largest foreign countries of birth are Romania, Germany, France, Kyrgyzstan, and Switzerland.
