= Santadi =

- Comune
- Comune di Santadi
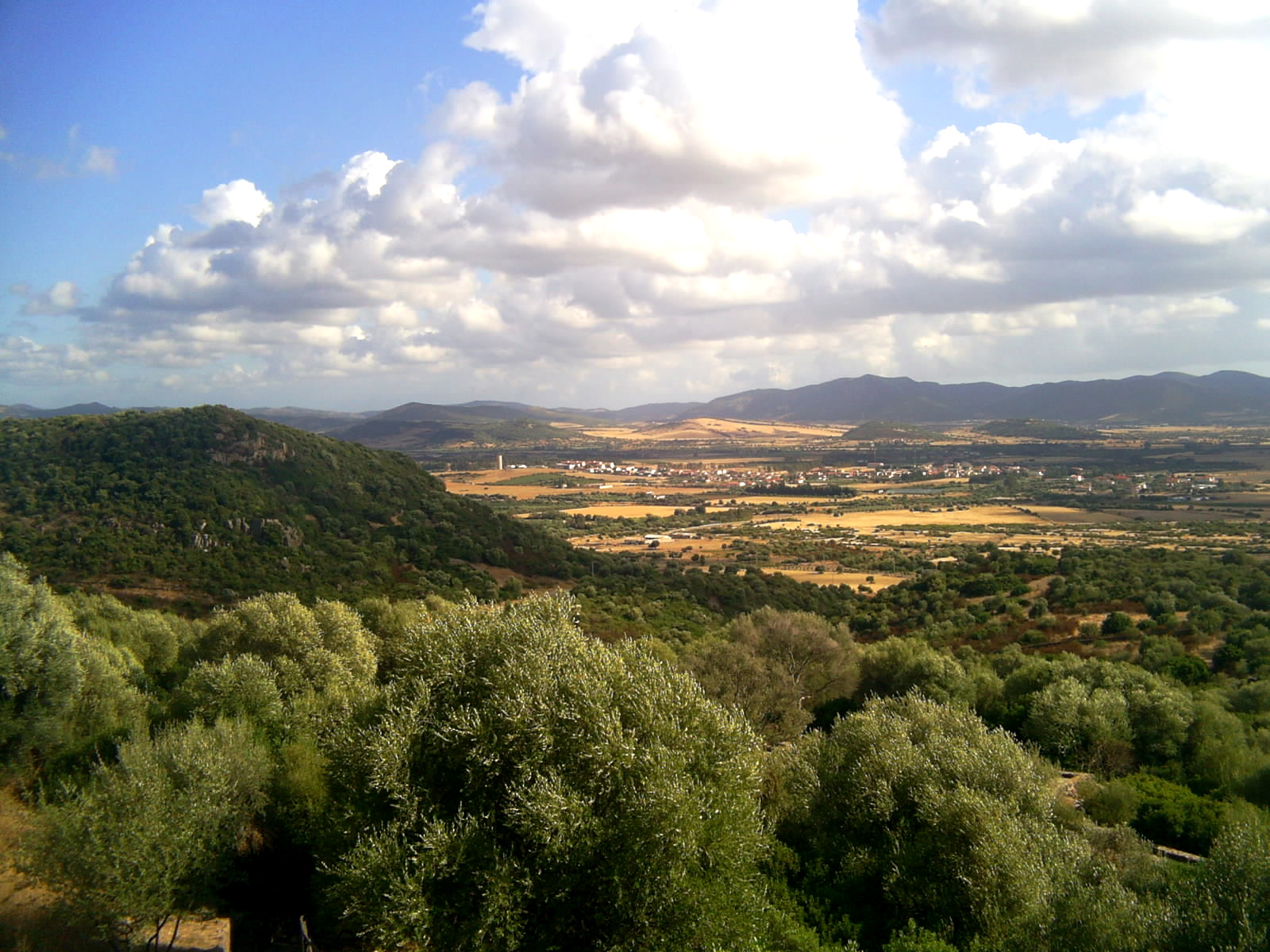
- View of Santadi

- Location within Sardinia
- Coordinates: 39°6′N 8°43′E
- Country: Italy
- Region: Sardinia
- Province: Sulcis Iglesiente

Government
  - Mayor: Elio Sundas

Area
  - Total: 116.49 km^{2} (44.98 sq mi)
- Elevation: 135 m (443 ft)

Population (2026)
  - Total: 3,029
  - Density: 26.00/km^{2} (67.35/sq mi)
- Demonym: Santadesi
- Time zone: UTC+1 (CET)
  - Summer (DST): UTC+2 (CEST)
- Postal code: 09010
- Dialing code: 0781
- Website: Official website

Santadi is a town and comune (municipality) in the Province of Sulcis Iglesiente in the autonomous island region of Sardinia in Italy, located about 35 kilometres (22 mi) southwest of Cagliari and about 20 kilometres (12 mi) southeast of Carbonia. It has 3,029 inhabitants.

Santadi borders the municipalities of Assemini, Domus de Maria, Nuxis, Piscinas, Pula, Teulada, Villa San Pietro, and Villaperuccio.

Starting from a hill next to the small town of Santadi, it is possible to see how the urban development system develops in concentric circles. This fact gave rise to the hypothesis that Santadi is what remains of the capital of the island mentioned by Plato in the third chapter of the Timaeus and in Critias.

== Demographics ==
As of 2026, the population is 3,029, of which 49.2% are male, and 50.8% are female. Minors make up 10.7% of the population, and seniors make up 34.7%.

Historical population

Year	Pop.	±%
1861	1,520	—
1871	1,677	+10.3%
1881	1,787	+6.6%
1901	2,163	+21.0%
1911	2,456	+13.5%
1921	2,812	+14.5%
1931	3,069	+9.1%
1936	3,213	+4.7%

Year	Pop.	±%
1951	4,142	+28.9%
1961	4,538	+9.6%
1971	3,964	−12.6%
1981	3,944	−0.5%
1991	4,061	+3.0%
2001	3,767	−7.2%
2011	3,570	−5.2%
2021	3,194	−10.5%

Source: ISTAT

=== Immigration ===
As of 2025, immigrants make up 1.7% of the total population. The 5 largest foreign countries of birth are Germany, Romania, France, Poland, and Belgium.
