= Buggerru =

Buggerru Bugerru (Sardinian)
- Comune
- Comune di Buggerru
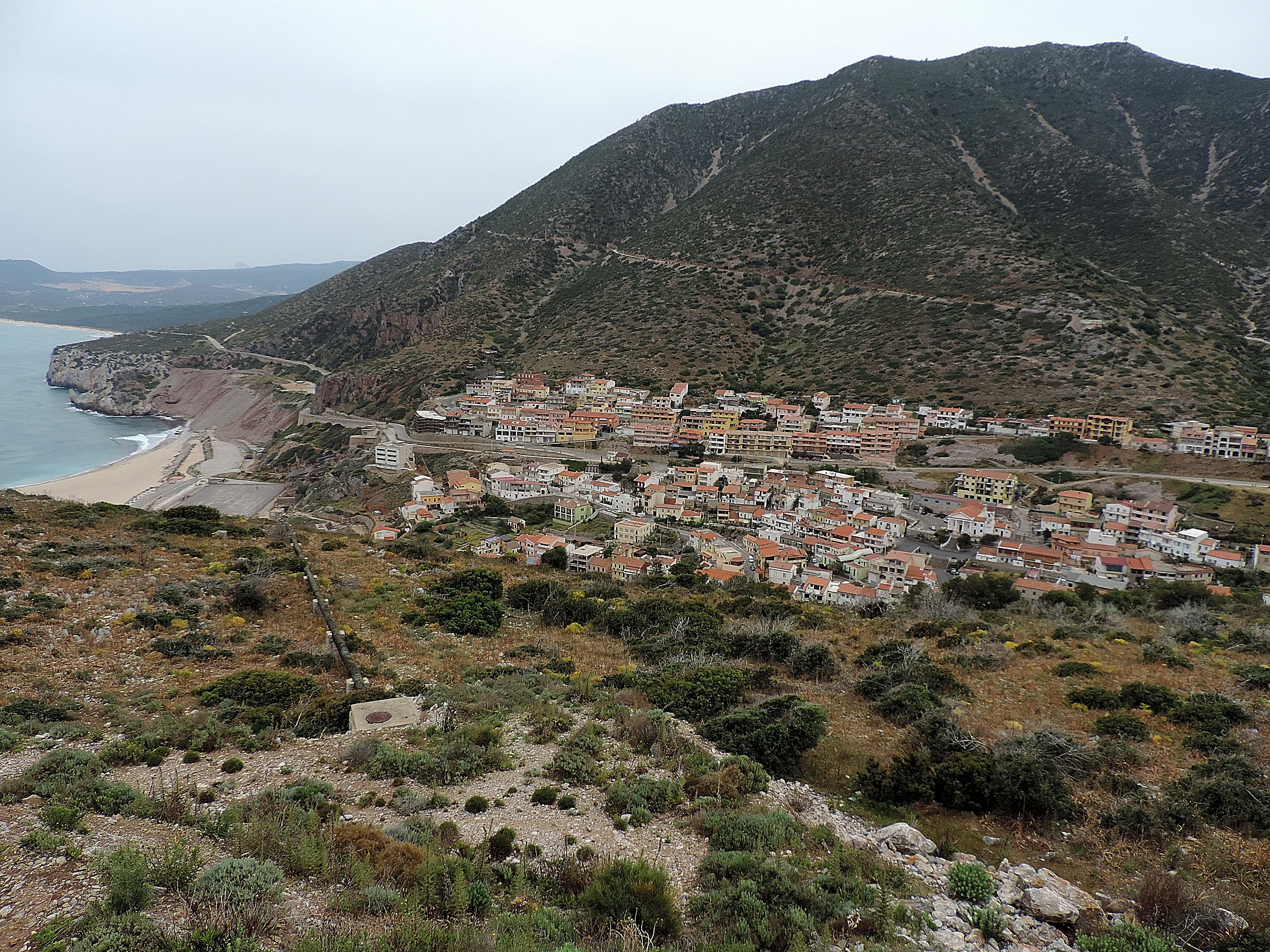
- View of Buggerru

- Coat of arms

- Location within Sardinia
- Coordinates: 39°23′51″N 08°24′09″E
- Country: Italy
- Region: Sardinia
- Province: Sulcis Iglesiente
- Frazioni: San Nicolò, Portisceddu, Is Ortus De Mari, Piscina Morta, Grugua, Cala Domestica, Caitas, Pranu Sartu, Candiazzus, Su Fundu Mannu

Government
  - Mayor: Silvano Farris

Area
  - Total: 48.33 km^{2} (18.66 sq mi)
- Elevation: 51 m (167 ft)

Population (2026)
  - Total: 1,007
  - Density: 20.84/km^{2} (53.96/sq mi)
- Demonym: Buggerrai
- Time zone: UTC+1 (CET)
  - Summer (DST): UTC+2 (CEST)
- Postal code: 09010
- Dialing code: 0781

Buggerru (Sardinian: Bugerru) is a town and comune (municipality) in the Province of Sulcis Iglesiente in the autonomous island region of Sardinia in Italy, located about 70 kilometres (43 mi) northwest of Cagliari and about 30 kilometres (19 mi) northwest of Carbonia. It has 1,007 inhabitants.

Buggerru borders the municipalities of Fluminimaggiore and Iglesias.

== Demographics ==
As of 2026, the population is 1,007, of which 51.5% are male, and 48.5% are female. Minors make up 11.0% of the population, and seniors make up 33.5%.

Historical population

Year	Pop.	±%
1861	439	—
1871	513	+16.9%
1881	653	+27.3%
1901	5,739	+778.9%
1911	5,151	−10.2%
1921	2,311	−55.1%
1931	2,595	+12.3%
1936	2,272	−12.4%

Year	Pop.	±%
1951	2,015	−11.3%
1961	1,767	−12.3%
1971	1,385	−21.6%
1981	1,242	−10.3%
1991	1,233	−0.7%
2001	1,163	−5.7%
2011	1,108	−4.7%
2021	1,053	−5.0%

Source: ISTAT

=== Immigration ===
As of 2025, immigrants make up 3.5% of the total population. The 5 largest foreign countries of birth are Germany, Romania, Venezuela, Switzerland, and France.

== Gallery ==
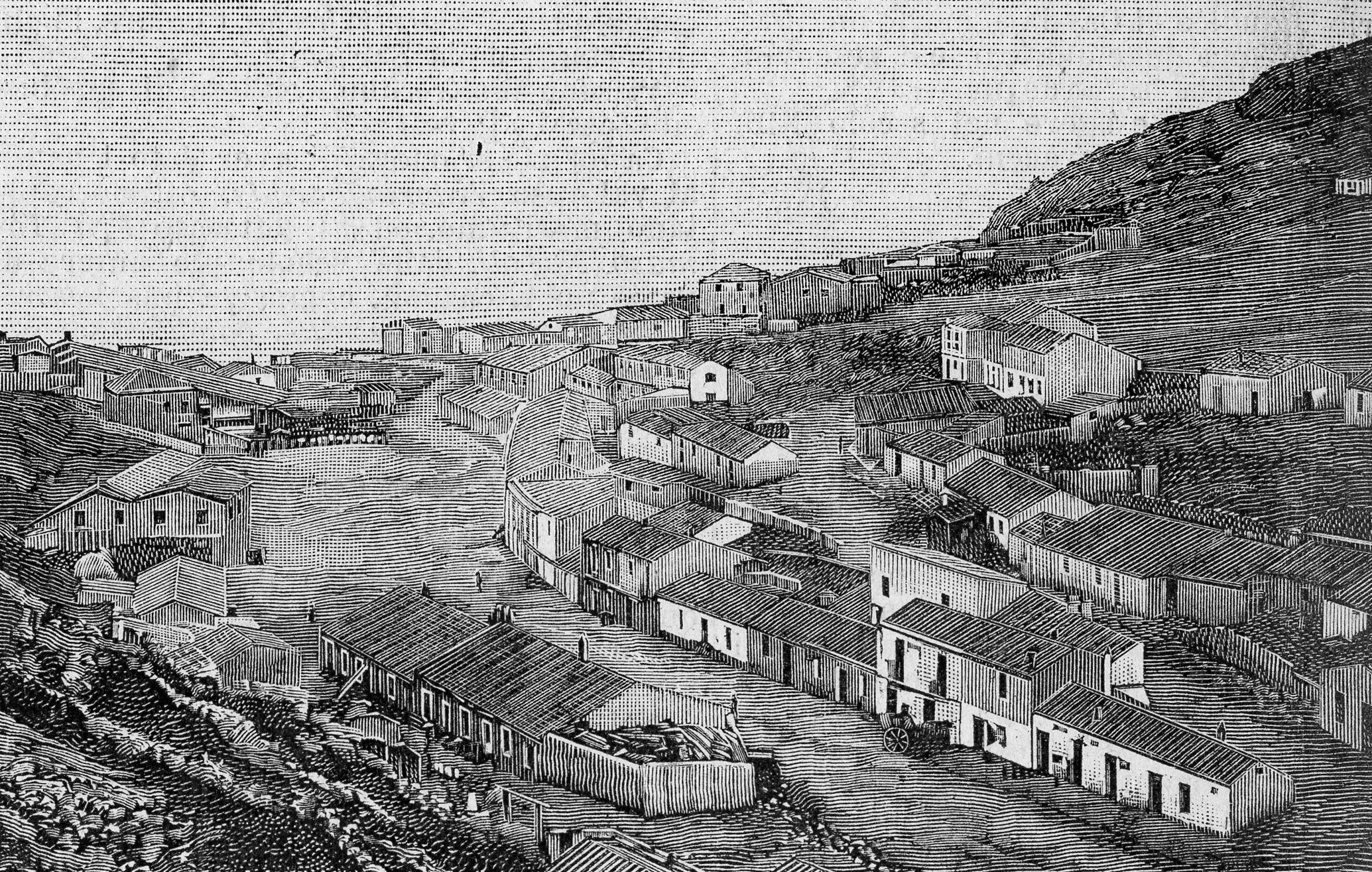
The Buggerru mine in 1901

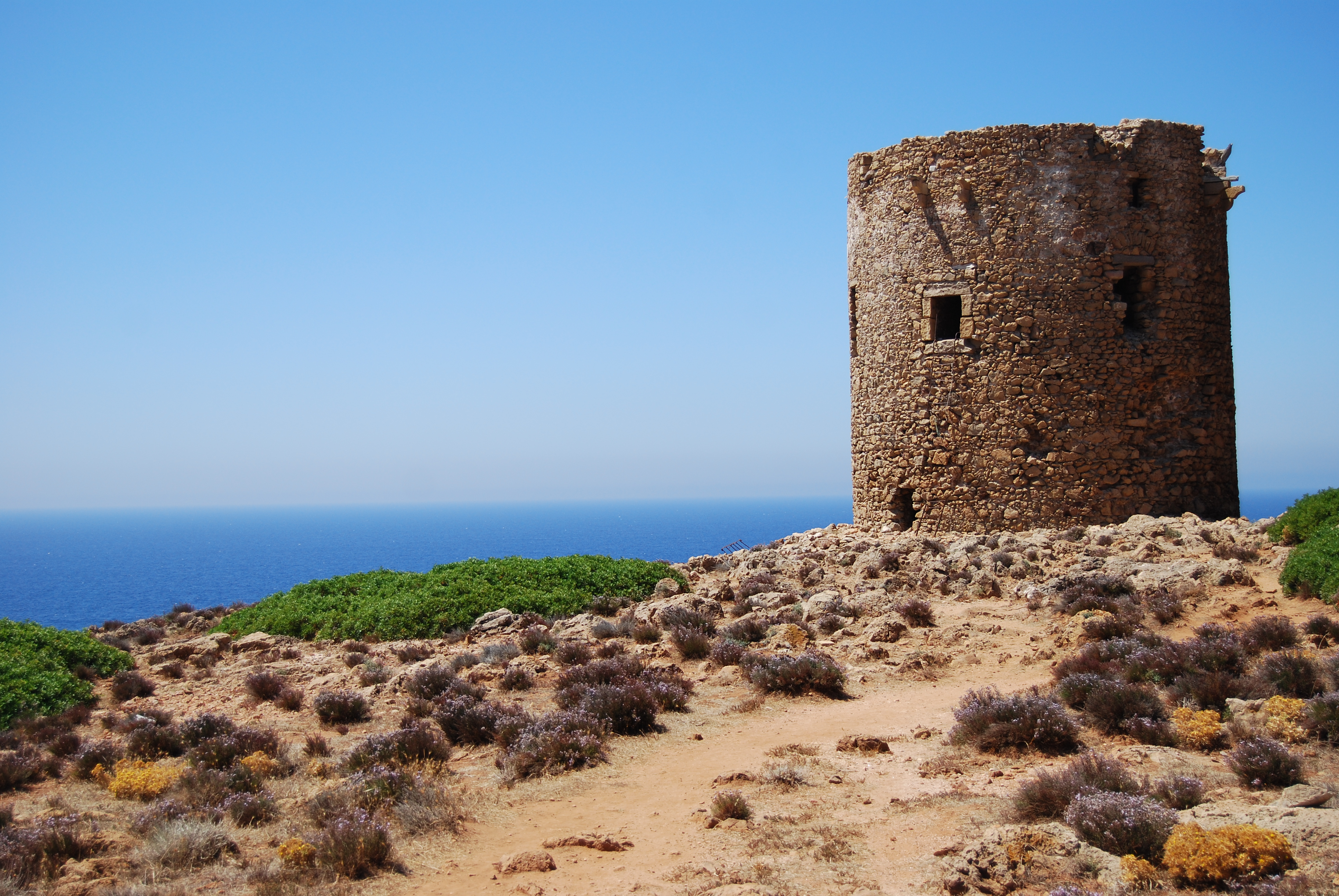
Coastal tower of Cala Domestica, 16th century

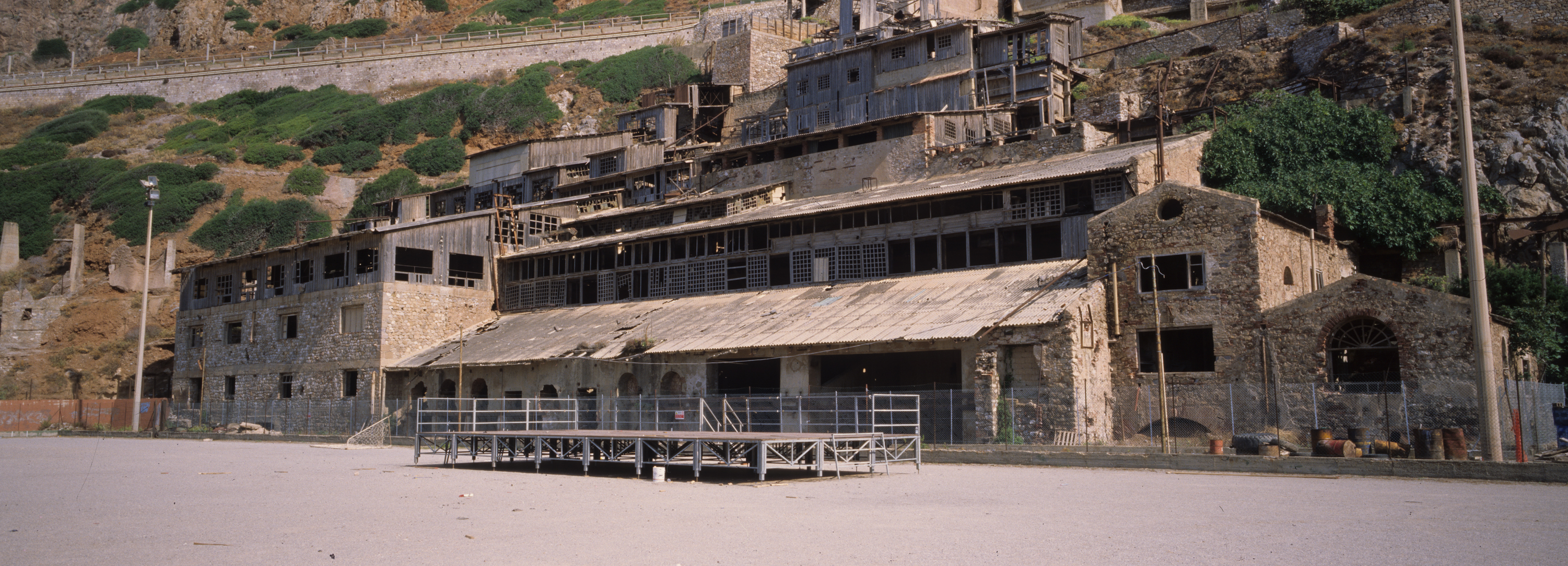
Old mine building

== Culture ==
Derek Jarman's 1976 film Sebastiane was shot on the Cala Domestica, a beach located near the town.

== See also ==
- History of mining in Sardinia
