= Masainas =

- Comune
- Comune di Masainas
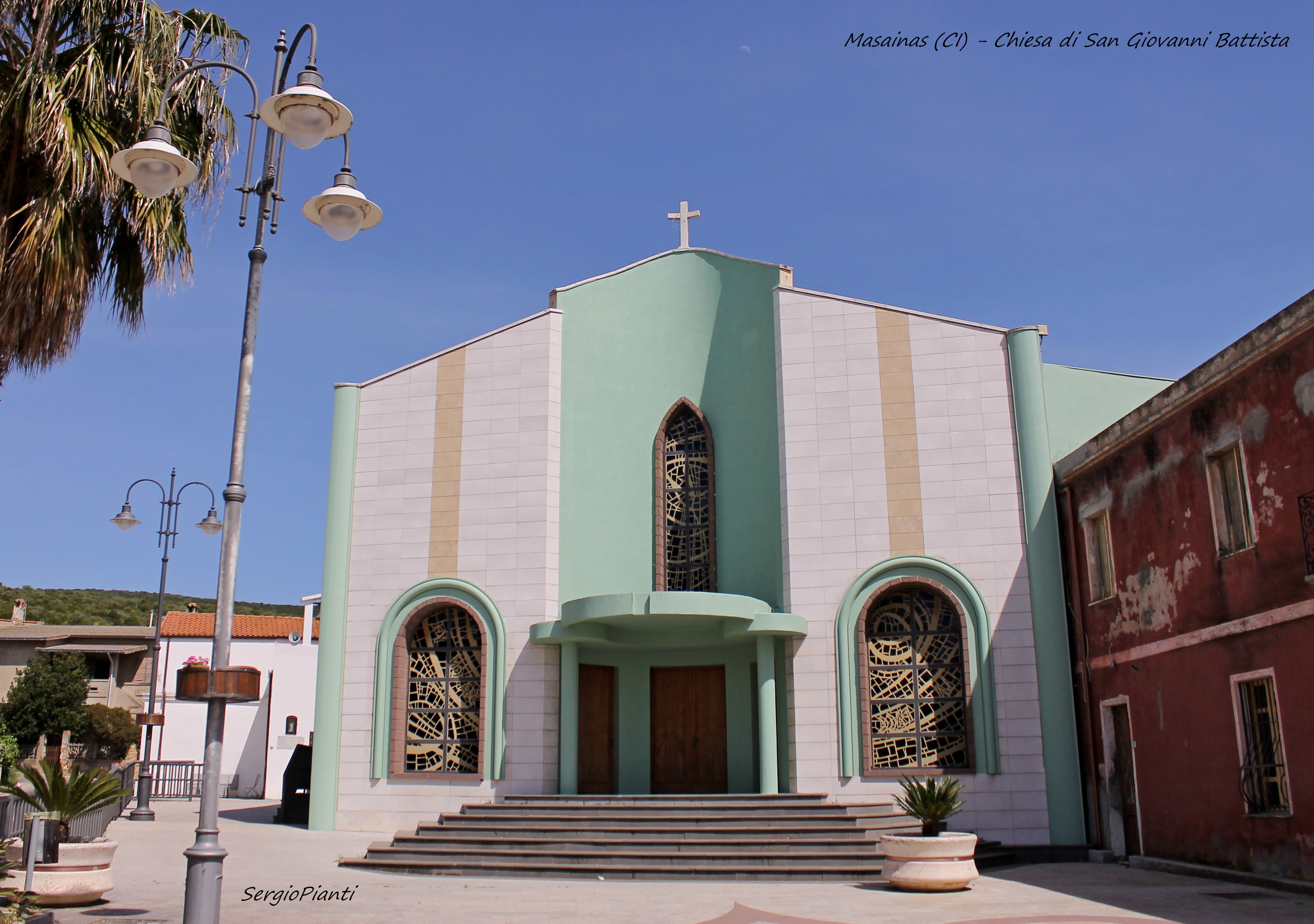
- Church of San Giovanni Battista

- Location within Sardinia
- Coordinates: 39°3′N 8°38′E
- Country: Italy
- Region: Sardinia
- Province: Sulcis Iglesiente
- Frazioni: Is Fiascus, Is Cuccus, Is Murronis, Is Lais, Is Solinas, Is Crobbedus, Is Mancas, Is Cannigonis

Government
  - Mayor: Ivo Melis

Area
  - Total: 23.69 km^{2} (9.15 sq mi)
- Elevation: 57 m (187 ft)

Population (2026)
  - Total: 1,203
  - Density: 50.78/km^{2} (131.5/sq mi)
- Demonym: Masainesi
- Time zone: UTC+1 (CET)
  - Summer (DST): UTC+2 (CEST)
- Postal code: 09010
- Dialing code: 0781
- Patron saint: St. John the Baptist
- Saint day: 24 June
- Website: Official website

Masainas is a town and comune (municipality) in the Province of Sulcis Iglesiente in the autonomous island region of Sardinia in Italy, part of the traditional region of Sulcis, located about 45 kilometres (28 miles) southwest of Cagliari and about 15 km (9 mi) southeast of Carbonia. It has 1,203 inhabitants.

Masainas borders the municipalities of Giba, Piscinas, Sant'Anna Arresi, and Teulada.

== Demographics ==
As of 2026, the population is 1,203, of which 47.5% are male, and 52.5% are female. Minors make up 8.9% of the population, and seniors make up 36.2%.

Historical population

Year	Pop.	±%
1861	626	—
1871	635	+1.4%
1881	660	+3.9%
1901	710	+7.6%
1911	884	+24.5%
1921	893	+1.0%
1931	1,024	+14.7%
1936	946	−7.6%

Year	Pop.	±%
1951	1,344	+42.1%
1961	1,587	+18.1%
1971	1,462	−7.9%
1981	1,563	+6.9%
1991	1,546	−1.1%
2001	1,479	−4.3%
2011	1,350	−8.7%
2021	1,227	−9.1%

Source: ISTAT

=== Immigration ===
As of 2025, immigrants make up 3.8% of the total population. The 5 largest foreign countries of birth are Germany, Morocco, Bangladesh, Ukraine, and France.
