= Villaperuccio =

Villaperuccio Sa Baronia (Sardinian)
- Comune
- Comune di Villaperuccio
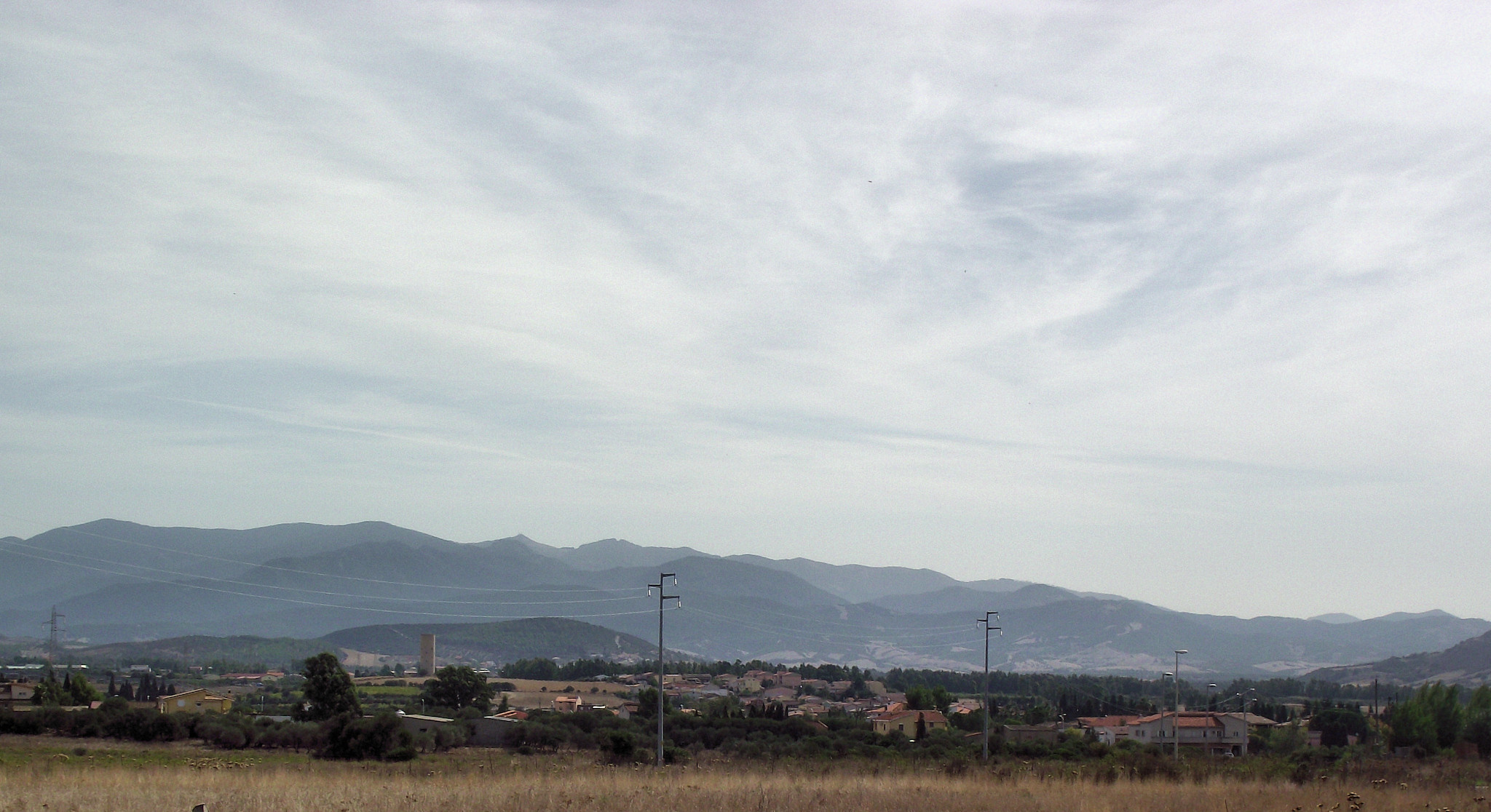
- View of Villaperuccio

- Coat of arms

- Location within Sardinia
- Coordinates: 39°7′N 8°40′E
- Country: Italy
- Region: Sardinia
- Province: Sulcis Iglesiente

Government
  - Mayor: Antonello Pirosu

Area
  - Total: 36.43 km^{2} (14.07 sq mi)
- Elevation: 62 m (203 ft)

Population (2026)
  - Total: 1,007
  - Density: 27.64/km^{2} (71.59/sq mi)
- Time zone: UTC+1 (CET)
  - Summer (DST): UTC+2 (CEST)
- Postal code: 09010
- Dialing code: 0781

Villaperuccio (Sardinian: Sa Baronia) is a town and comune (municipality) in the Province of Sulcis Iglesiente in the autonomous island region of Sardinia in Italy, located about 40 kilometres (25 mi) southwest of Cagliari and about 13 kilometres (8 mi) southeast of Carbonia, in the lower Sulcis. It has 1,007 inhabitants.

Villaperuccio borders the municipalities of Narcao, Nuxis, Perdaxius, Piscinas, Santadi, and Tratalias. Its territory includes the pre-Nuragic necropolis of Montessu, some 40 nuraghe and the menhir site of is perdas croccadas.

== Demographics ==
As of 2026, the population is 1,007, of which 48.4% are male, and 51.6% are female. Minors make up 11.9% of the population, and seniors make up 30.8%.

Historical population

Year	Pop.	±%
1861	744	—
1871	776	+4.3%
1881	673	−13.3%
1901	590	−12.3%
1911	760	+28.8%
1921	793	+4.3%
1931	902	+13.7%
1936	819	−9.2%

Year	Pop.	±%
1951	1,052	+28.4%
1961	1,134	+7.8%
1971	1,053	−7.1%
1981	1,063	+0.9%
1991	1,160	+9.1%
2001	1,117	−3.7%
2011	1,097	−1.8%
2021	1,010	−7.9%

Source: ISTAT

=== Immigration ===
As of 2025, immigrants make up 4.4% of the total population. The 5 largest foreign countries of birth are Romania, Germany, Morocco, Albania, and China.
