= Piscinas =

- Comune
- Comune di Piscinas
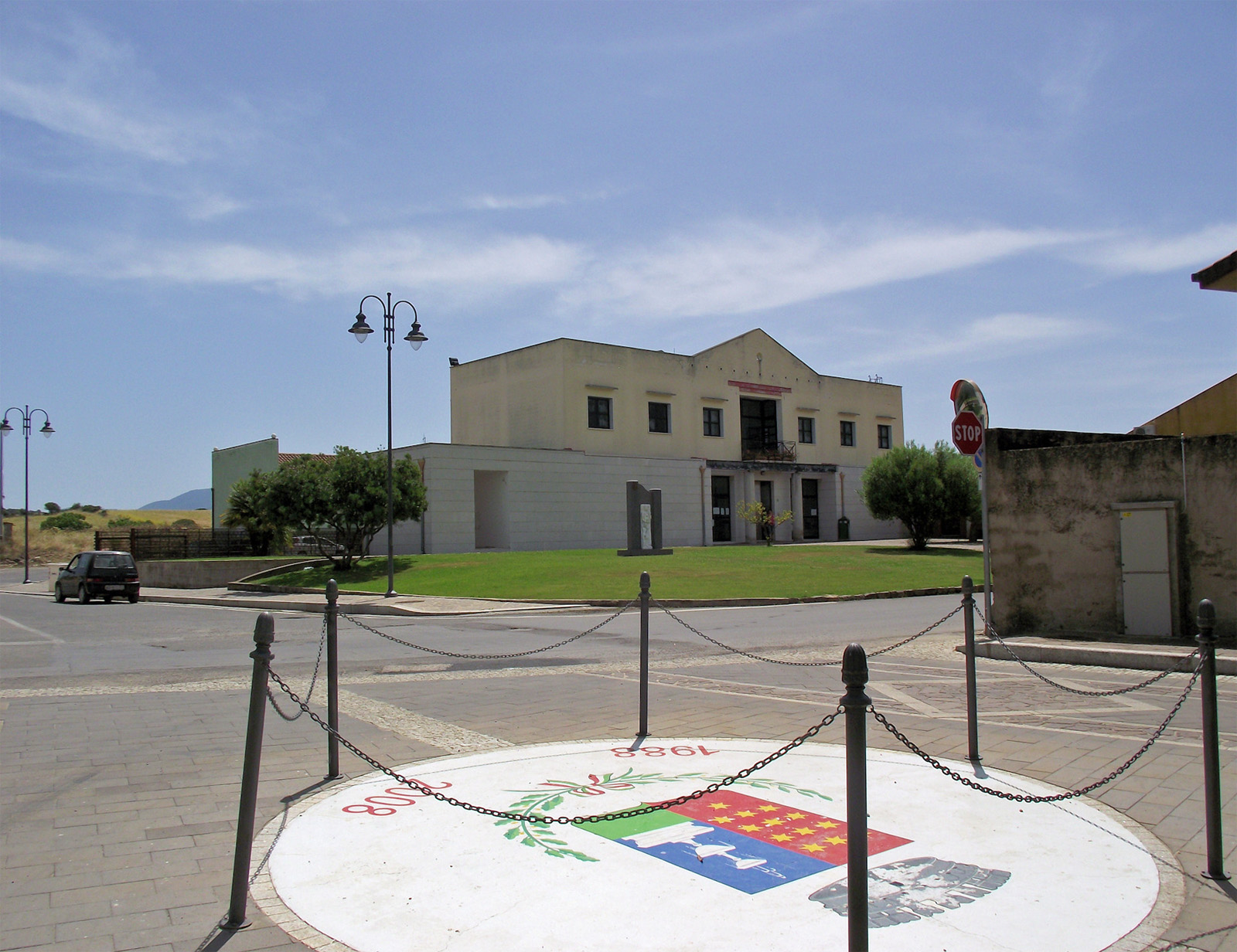
- Town hall

- Coat of arms

- Location within Sardinia
- Coordinates: 39°5′N 8°40′E
- Country: Italy
- Region: Sardinia
- Province: Sulcis Iglesiente

Government
  - Mayor: Mariano Cogotti

Area
  - Total: 16.89 km^{2} (6.52 sq mi)

Population (2026)
  - Total: 758
  - Density: 44.9/km^{2} (116/sq mi)
- Time zone: UTC+1 (CET)
  - Summer (DST): UTC+2 (CEST)
- Postal code: 09010
- Dialing code: 0781

Piscinas is a village and comune (municipality) in the Province of Sulcis Iglesiente in the autonomous island region of Sardinia in Italy, located about 40 kilometres (25 mi) southwest of Cagliari and about 15 kilometres (9 mi) southeast of Carbonia, in the traditional subregion of Sulcis-Iglesiente. It has 758 inhabitants.

Piscinas borders the municipalities of Giba, Masainas, Santadi, Teulada, Tratalias, and Villaperuccio.

== Demographics ==
As of 2026, the population is 758, of which 48.8% are male, and 51.2% are female. Minors make up 11.9% of the population, and seniors make up 31.4%.

Historical population

Year	Pop.	±%
1861	639	—
1871	654	+2.3%
1881	682	+4.3%
1901	676	−0.9%
1911	662	−2.1%
1921	720	+8.8%
1931	835	+16.0%
1936	756	−9.5%

Year	Pop.	±%
1951	877	+16.0%
1961	806	−8.1%
1971	938	+16.4%
1981	973	+3.7%
1991	992	+2.0%
2001	886	−10.7%
2011	872	−1.6%
2021	816	−6.4%

Source: ISTAT

=== Immigration ===
As of 2025, immigrants make up 2.8% of the total population. The 5 largest foreign countries of birth are Germany, Romania, Morocco, Brazil, and the Dominican Republic.
