= Siliqua, Sardinia =

Siliqua Silìcua (Sardinian)
- Comune
- Comune di Siliqua
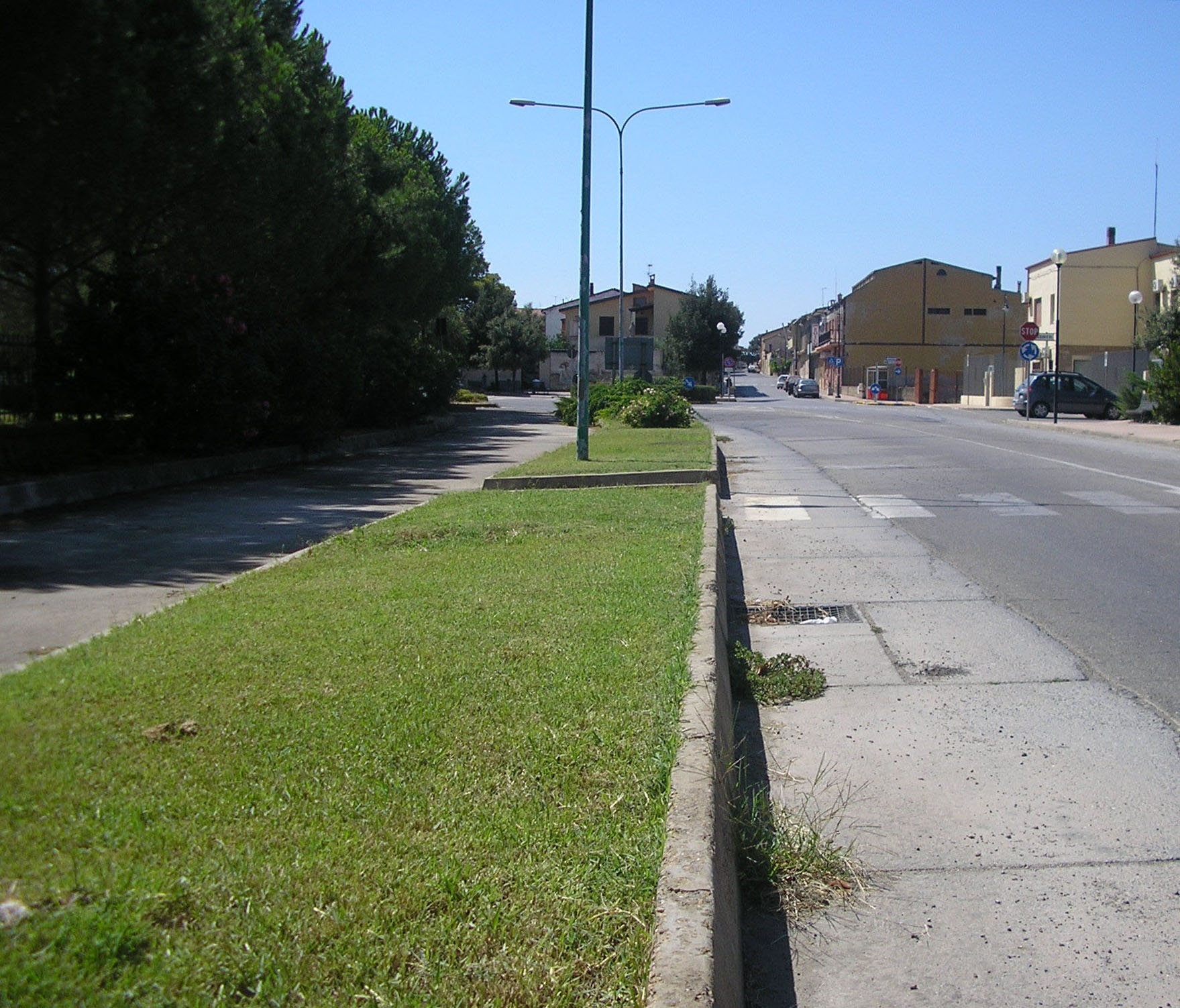

- Coat of arms

- Location within Sardinia
- Coordinates: 39°18′N 8°49′E
- Country: Italy
- Region: Sardinia
- Metropolitan city: Cagliari (CA)

Government
  - Mayor: Piergiorgio Lixia

Area
  - Total: 190.4 km^{2} (73.5 sq mi)
- Elevation: 66 m (217 ft)

Population (30 June 2008)
  - Total: 4,046
  - Density: 21.25/km^{2} (55.04/sq mi)
- Demonym: Siliquesi
- Time zone: UTC+1 (CET)
  - Summer (DST): UTC+2 (CEST)
- Postal code: 09010
- Dialing code: 0781
- Website: Official website

Siliqua (Sardinian: Silìcua) is a comune (municipality) in the Metropolitan City of Cagliari in the island of Sardinia, located about 25 kilometres (16 mi) northwest of Cagliari. As of 31 December 2004, it had a population of 4,077 and an area of 190.4 square kilometres (73.5 mi^{2}).

== Main sights ==
- Castle of Acquafredda (13th century), commanding the valley of the Cixerri river. It was built by count Ugolino della Gherardesca, and was later held by the Aragonese and other Sardinian feudataries.
- Several Domus de janas
- Natural reserve of Monte Arcosu

== See also ==
- Campidano
- Sulcis
