= Settimo San Pietro =

Settimo San Pietro Sètimu
- Comune
- Comune di Settimo San Pietro
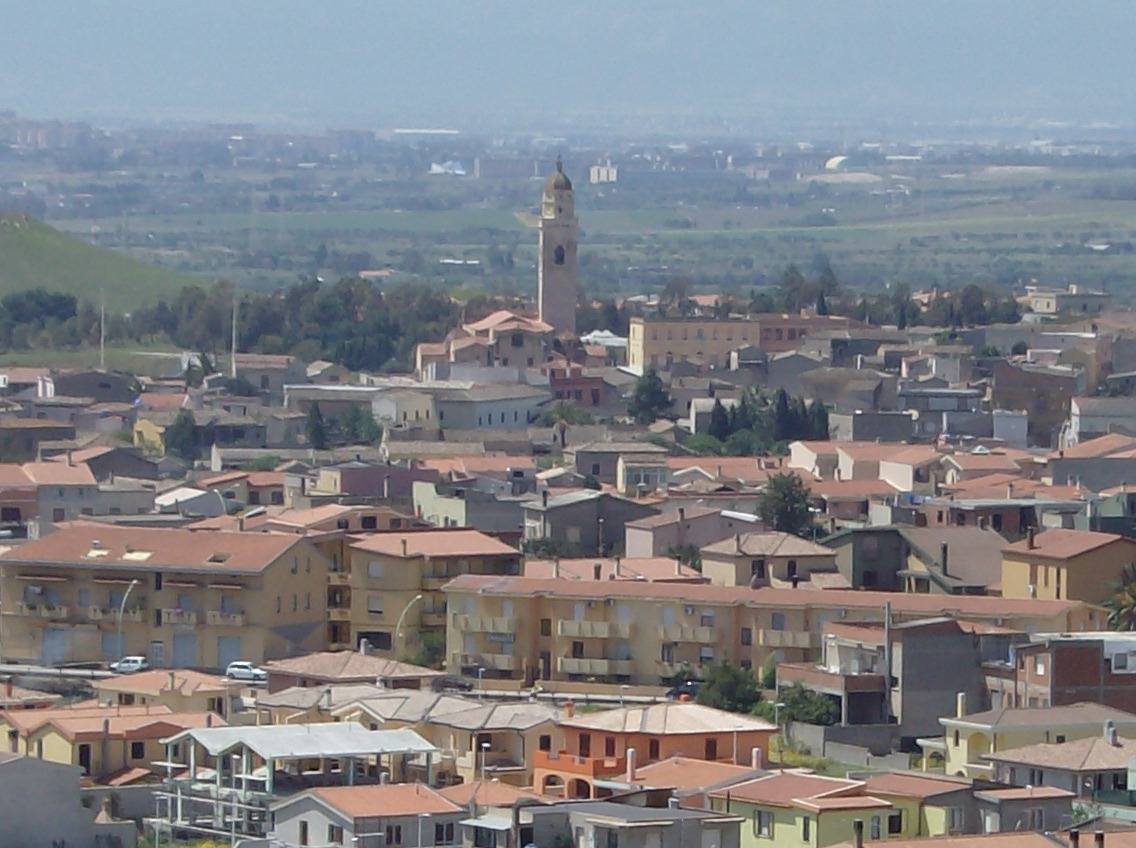

- Location within Sardinia
- Coordinates: 39°17′N 9°11′E
- Country: Italy
- Region: Sardinia
- Metropolitan city: Cagliari (CA)

Government
  - Mayor: Gian Luigi Puddu

Area
  - Total: 23.29 km^{2} (8.99 sq mi)
- Elevation: 70 m (230 ft)

Population (2025)
  - Total: 6,965
  - Density: 299.1/km^{2} (774.5/sq mi)
- Demonym: Settimesi
- Time zone: UTC+1 (CET)
  - Summer (DST): UTC+2 (CEST)
- Postal code: 09040
- Dialing code: 070
- Website: Official website

Settimo San Pietro, Sètimu in Sardinian language, is a comune (municipality) of the Metropolitan City of Cagliari in the Italian region of Sardinia, located about 9 kilometres (6 mi) northeast of Cagliari. It has 6,965 inhabitants.

Settimo San Pietro borders the following municipalities: Quartucciu, Selargius, Serdiana, Sestu, Sinnai, Soleminis.

== Demographics ==
Historical population

Year	Pop.	±%
1861	1,801	—
1871	1,530	−15.0%
1881	1,550	+1.3%
1901	1,770	+14.2%
1911	1,915	+8.2%
1921	1,953	+2.0%
1931	2,143	+9.7%
1936	2,208	+3.0%

Year	Pop.	±%
1951	2,740	+24.1%
1961	3,285	+19.9%
1971	3,583	+9.1%
1981	4,792	+33.7%
1991	5,524	+15.3%
2001	5,949	+7.7%
2011	6,532	+9.8%
2021	6,882	+5.4%

Source: ISTAT

== See also ==
- S'acqua 'e is dolus
