= Selargius =

Selargius Ceraxius (Sardinian)
- Comune
- Comune di Selargius
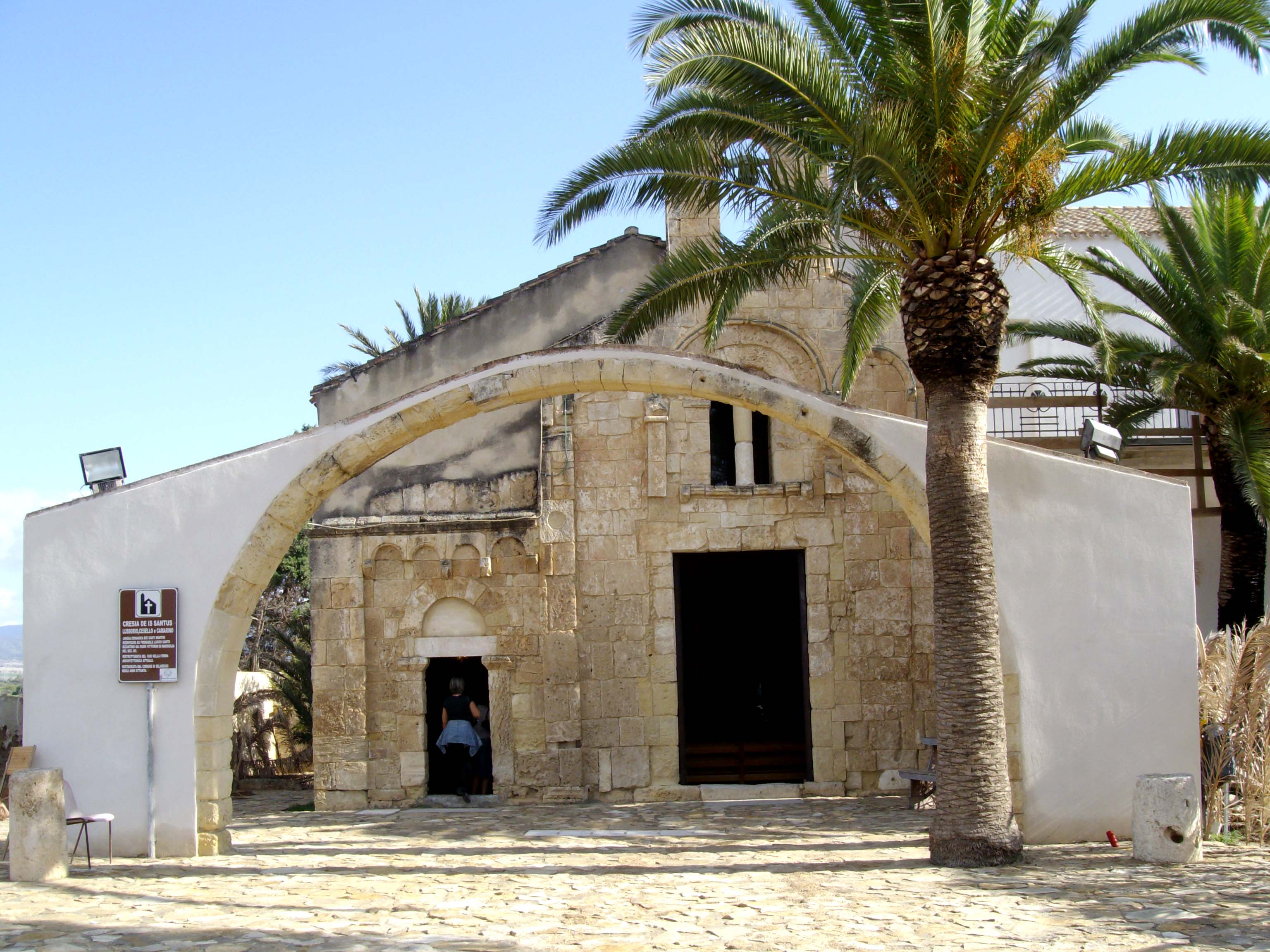
- San Lussorio Church

- Location within Sardinia
- Coordinates: 39°15′N 9°10′E
- Country: Italy
- Region: Sardinia
- Metropolitan city: Cagliari (CA)
- Frazioni: Is Corrias, Su Pezzu Mannu, Su Planu

Government
  - Mayor: Pier Luigi Concu

Area
  - Total: 26.67 km^{2} (10.30 sq mi)
- Elevation: 10 m (33 ft)

Population (2025)
  - Total: 28,323
  - Density: 1,062/km^{2} (2,751/sq mi)
- Demonym(s): Ceraxinus (sc); Selargini (sc)
- Time zone: UTC+1 (CET)
  - Summer (DST): UTC+2 (CEST)
- Postal code: 09047
- Dialing code: 070
- ISTAT code: 092068
- Website: Official website

Selargius (Sardinian: Ceràrgius, Ceraxius) is a comune (municipality) in the Metropolitan City of Cagliari in the Italian region Sardinia, located about 6 kilometres (4 mi) northeast of Cagliari. It has 28,323 inhabitants as of 2025.

The village exists since the Middle Ages as part of the Cagliari Campidanu part of the Giudicato of Cagliari. In 1928 it was merged by the Cagliari commune but gained again its autonomy in 1947, after a local referendum. Selargius is part of the Cagliari metropolitan area.

Selargius borders the municipalities of Cagliari, Monserrato, Quartu Sant'Elena, Quartucciu, Sestu and Settimo San Pietro.

== Demographics ==
Historical population

Year	Pop.	±%
1861	3,215	—
1871	2,976	−7.4%
1881	3,099	+4.1%
1901	3,393	+9.5%
1911	3,780	+11.4%
1921	3,856	+2.0%
1931	4,351	+12.8%
1936	4,668	+7.3%

Year	Pop.	±%
1951	6,916	+48.2%
1961	8,768	+26.8%
1971	12,110	+38.1%
1981	18,245	+50.7%
1991	23,237	+27.4%
2001	27,440	+18.1%
2011	28,684	+4.5%
2021	28,648	−0.1%

Source: ISTAT

== See also ==
- Molentargius - Saline Regional Park

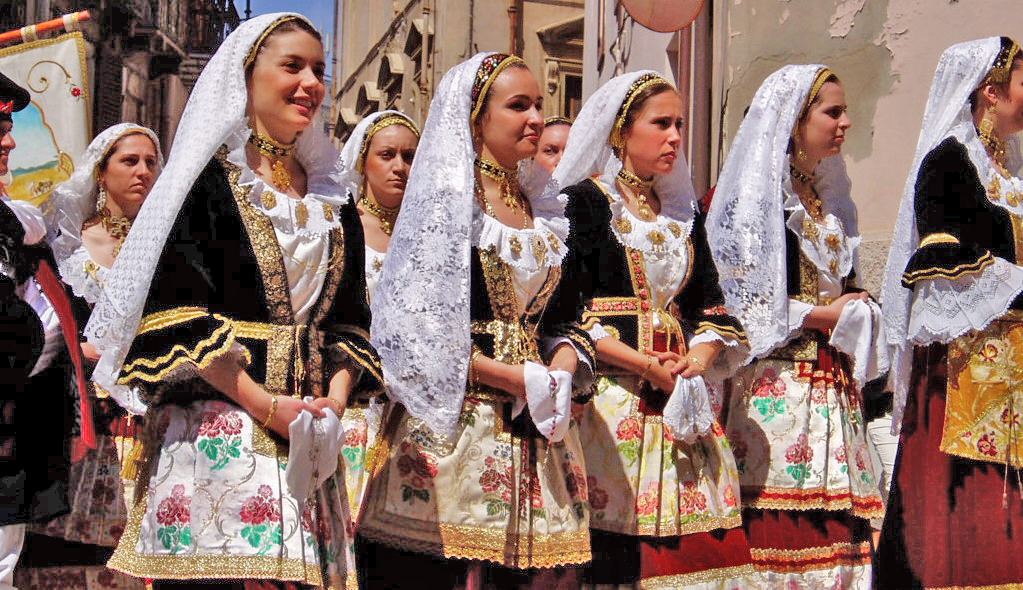
Traditional dresses
