= Nuraghe La Prisgiona =

Archaeological site in Sardinia, Italy

Coordinates: 41.0476°N 9.3624°E

Nuraghe la Prisciona
- Nuraghe La Prisgiona
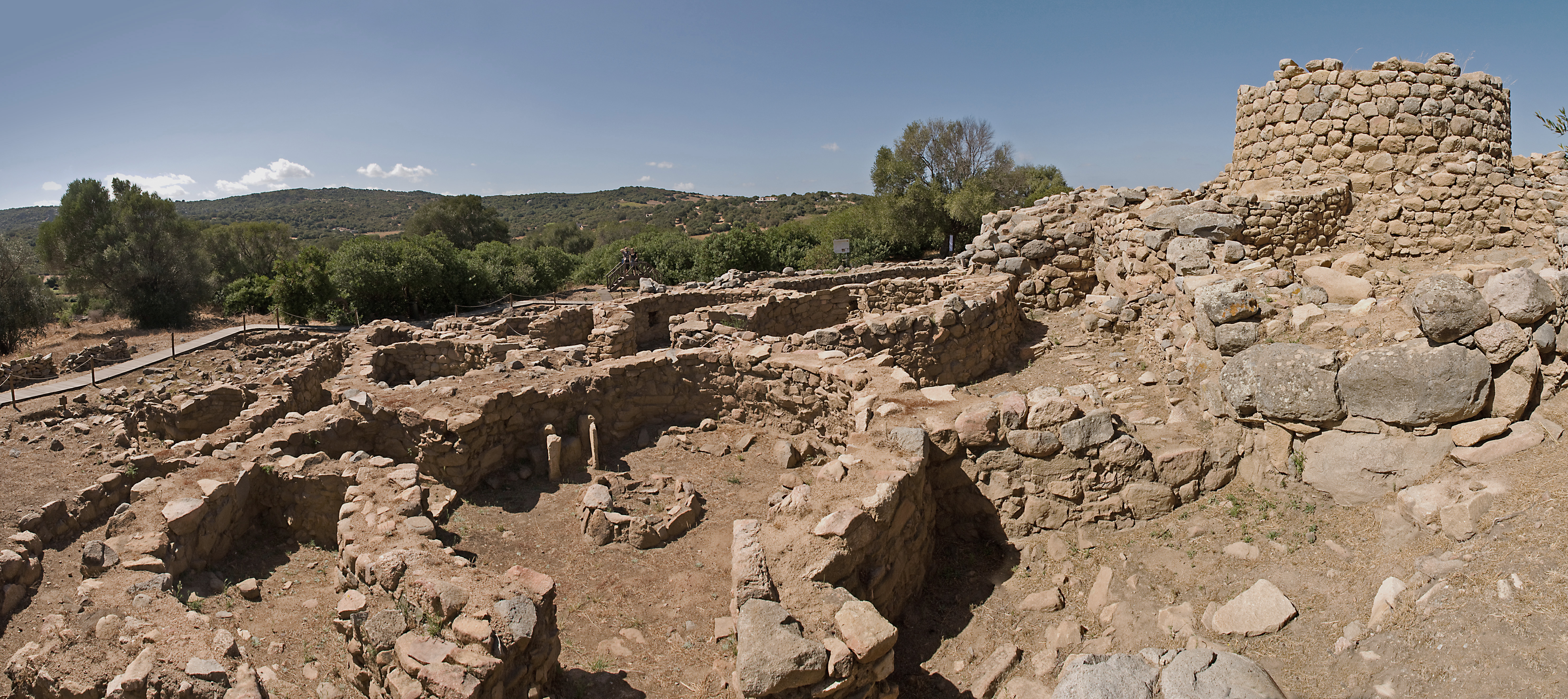
- The Nuraghe La Prisciona, Sardinia

- Location within Sardinia
- Type: Settlement
- Cultures: Nuragic civilization
- Location: 41° 02′ 52′′ north, 9° 21′ 45′′ east
- Region: Sardine

Site notes
- Material: megalithic
- Height: 158 m (518 ft)
- Excavation dates: 1959; 1999–2000; 2003–2008; 2013–
- Archaeologists: Ercole Contu
- Condition: ruined
- Management: I Beni Culturali della Sardegna
- Public access: yes
- Website: Arzachena, nuraghe La Prisciona (in Italian)

The Nuraghe La Prisgiona is a nuragic archaeological site (occupied from the 14th until the 9th century BC), located in the Capichera valley in the municipality of Arzachena, Costa Smeralda in the north of Sardinia. It consists of a nuraghe and a village comprising around 90–100 buildings, spread across 5 hectares. Findings from this site are, in many cases, unique in Sardinia, particularly with regard to decoration and use. Due to the large extent and number of buildings, the site is considered unique in North-East Sardinia. There is also some evidence for occupation during Roman and medieval times. The Giants' grave Coddu Vecchiu is located nearby.

== Architecture ==
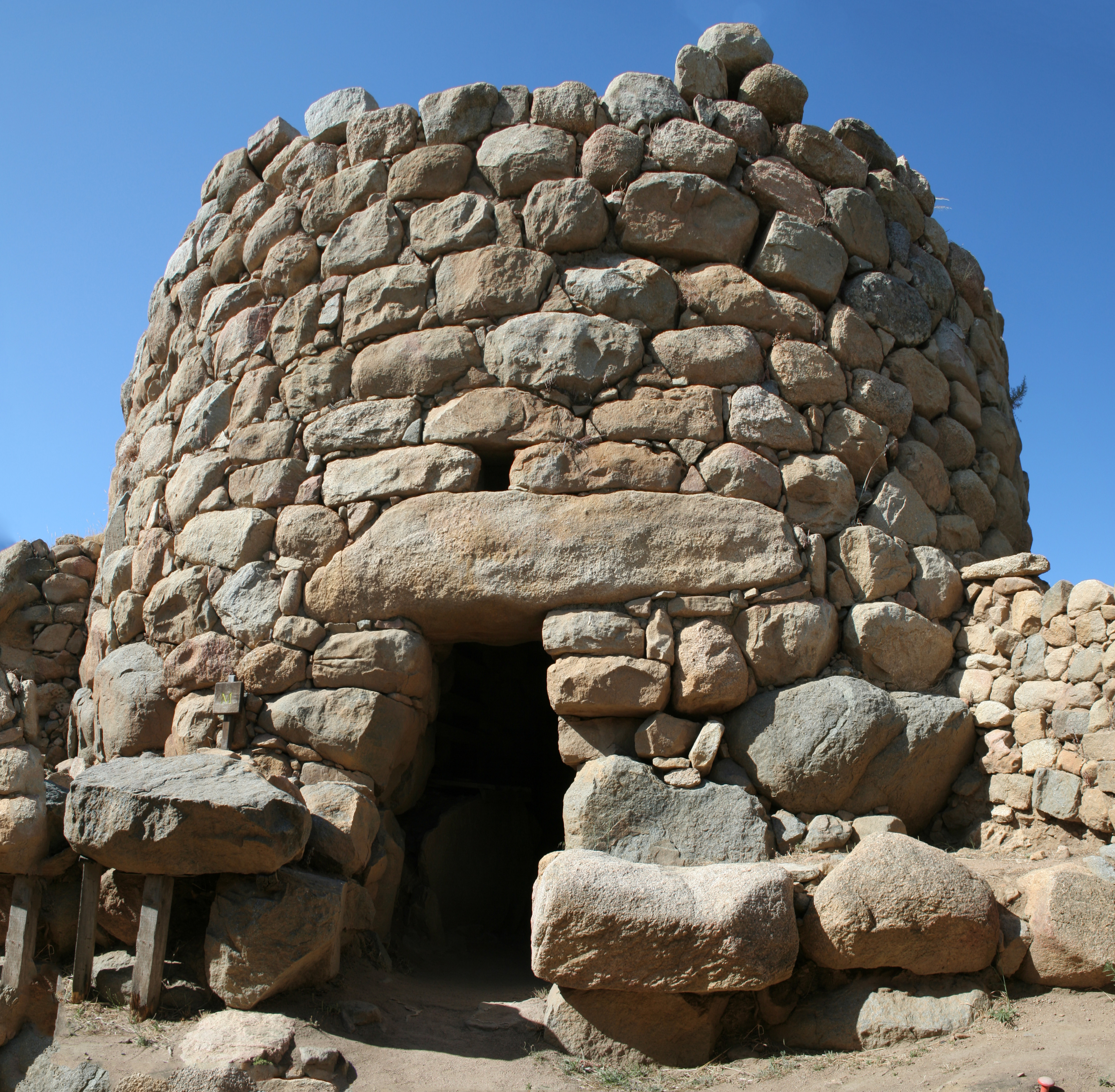
The Tower

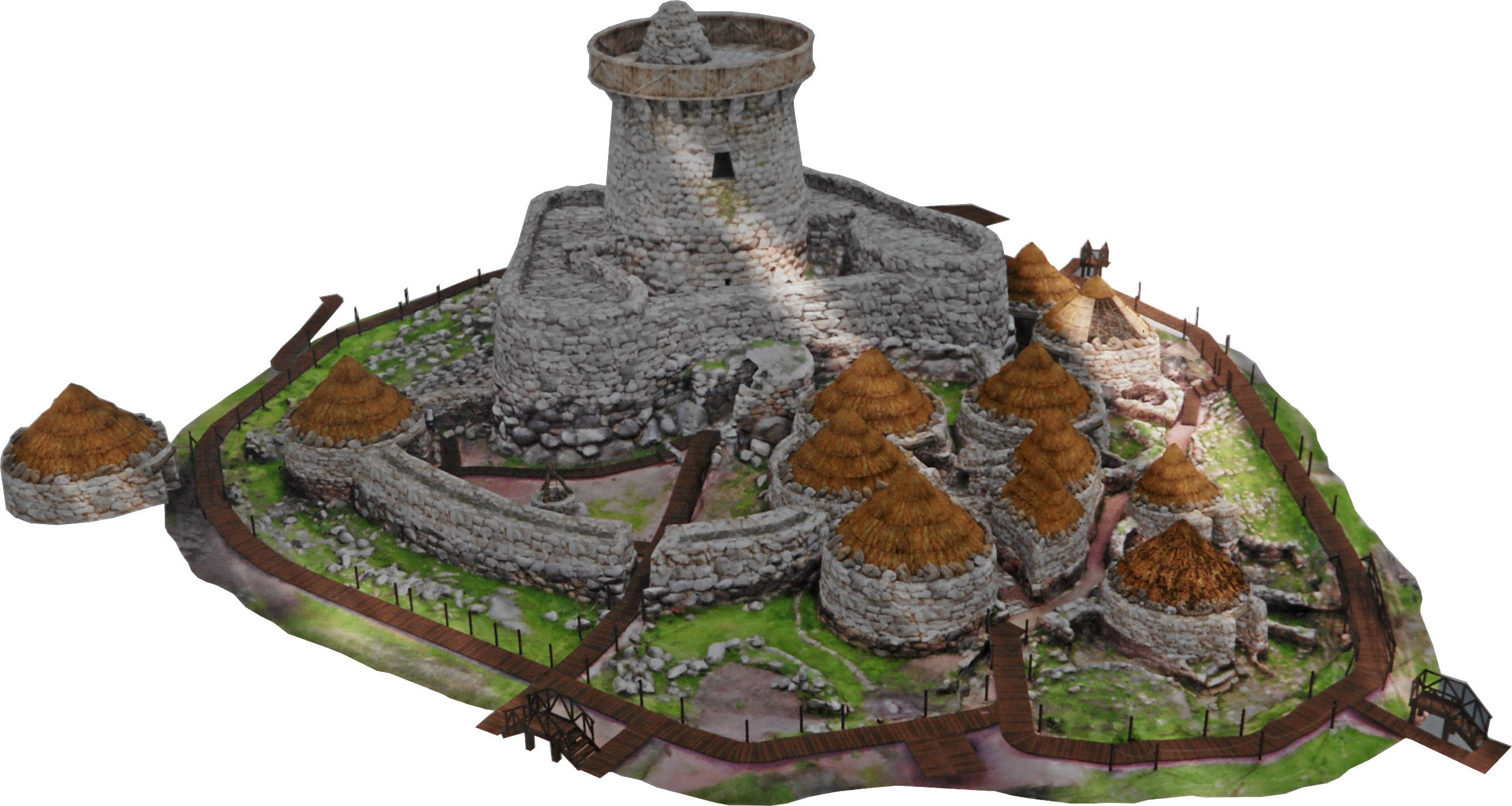
Graphic reconstruction

The nuraghe presides over an area of several square kilometers, with its prominent role confirmed by the size and the complexity of the architectural structure itself. The nuraghe is a complex nuraghe, of tholos (beehive tomb) typology, rather unusual in Gallura. The monument has a central tower (the keep) and 2 side towers, forming a bastion.

The keep has an entrance defined by a massive lintel of 3.20 m in length. The central chamber has a false dome, which is more than 6 meters high, with three niches in its interior. The bastion is further protected by a curtain wall that encloses a large courtyard.

Also within the bastion is a well, which is over 7 meters deep and still functioning today. At the bottom of the well, many ceramic artefacts were uncovered. Among them are many pitchers of the askoid typology, finely decorated and with traces of ancient repairs, giving evidence of their great value. The pitchers were not meant to simply hold liquids, but are clearly destined for other purposes. This unusual find prompts questions as to why these vessels were abandoned at the bottom of the well, and whether they may have been used during rituals.

The “meeting hut”, a peculiar round building, is located just a few meters from the well, which perhaps is not coincidental. The ring-shaped bench with 16 seats in the meeting hut may have been used by leaders or other people of rank (secular or religious). The importance and the exclusivity of the place are further confirmed by the discovery of a vase of unusual form and decoration. The vase was probably used to hold a special beverage, perhaps a decoction or an unusual distillate, whose consumption may have been restricted to a limited number of people, perhaps the 16 people attending meetings.

== The village ==
The village spreads around the Nuraghe and consists of around 90–100 huts. During the excavation of the first 15 huts, archaeologists immediately noticed their organization in small blocks among which intersect a series of paved lanes. A block is composed of a set of 5 huts, revealing specific craft activities, providing insight into the organization of production on a larger scale, serving not only at the people and families in the village but a larger market.

While the greater portion of the village is yet to be excavated, the present finds hint at a dynamic, organized community, connected to other markets in the Mediterranean.

== Chronology ==
The chronology data of the settlement shows occupation between the 14th century and the 9th century B.C. There is also evidence of Roman imperial age activity, as well as medieval activity (see below).

== Discovery of the site and research ==
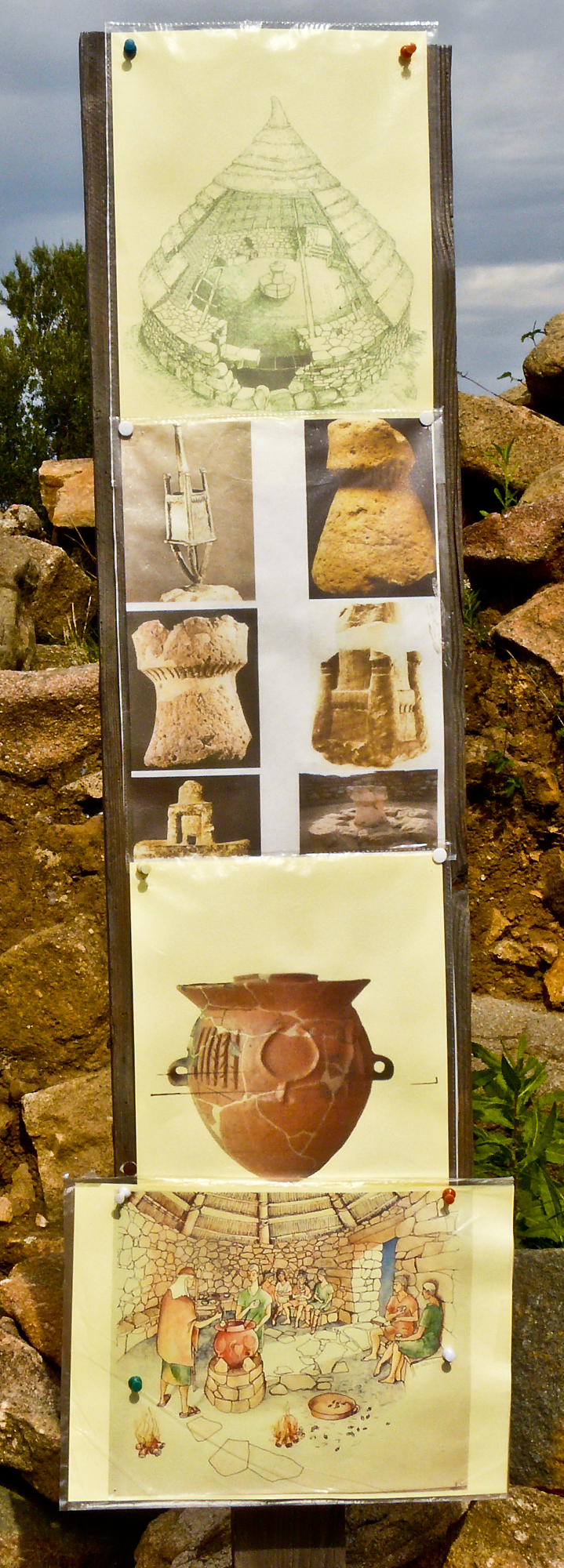

- Early 1900s: The site was brought to general attention by local school master Michele Ruzzittu. He also observed a large stone heap area, which suggested the presence of ancient dwellings.
- 1959: The first scientific investigation was conducted by veteran archaeologist Ercole Contu. He identified a central keep, a vaguely triangular bastion, which enclosed an inner court, and that was delimited by 2 towers and a counterfort. Moreover, exterior to the bastion, a trait of the boundary wall was easily recognized, as well as a small tower. Hidden in vegetation, another boundary wall was spotted, which enclosed the complex plus at least 10 huts in the neighbouring area. The digging at the time was conducted only in one hut and in some small portions of the court, externally to the bastion, where a still functioning well was found. The ceramic shards that were discovered during the excavation provided insight into the chronology and cultural phases of the site, stretching from the middle Bronze Age (comb decorated ceramic) to the Iron Age (ceramics decorated with impressed circles).
- 1999–2000: With funding from the Sardinia region central administration, it was possible to excavate the internal court of the bastion and the main façade of the nuraghe.
- 2003–2008: Exploration continued under the lead of archaeologist Angela Antona. A restoration laboratory was also set up, allowing taking care of shards and ceramics immediately, putting the pieces back together and giving an instant insight into life during the Bronze Age in Sardinia. Activity during the Roman imperial age and a re-use of the site in medieval age was also discovered.
- Present excavations (2013): In 2013, excavation was resumed by Angela Antona and her multi-disciplinary team. The focus is now on the huts in the village, and the complex architectural, political, social, and economic evolution of the site.

== Acknowledgements ==
This article has been adapted from a text written by Dr Angela Antona, published on the website of Nuragha La Prisgiona. Permission for adaptation and publishing on Wikipedia granted by the site administration on 14/9/2013.

== See also ==
- Su Nuraxi di Barumini
- Nuraghe Santu Antine
- Nuragic civilization
- Talaiot
- The giants tomb Coddu Vecchiu is nearby.
