= Giants' grave =

Sardinian megalithic gallery grave by the Nuragic civilization

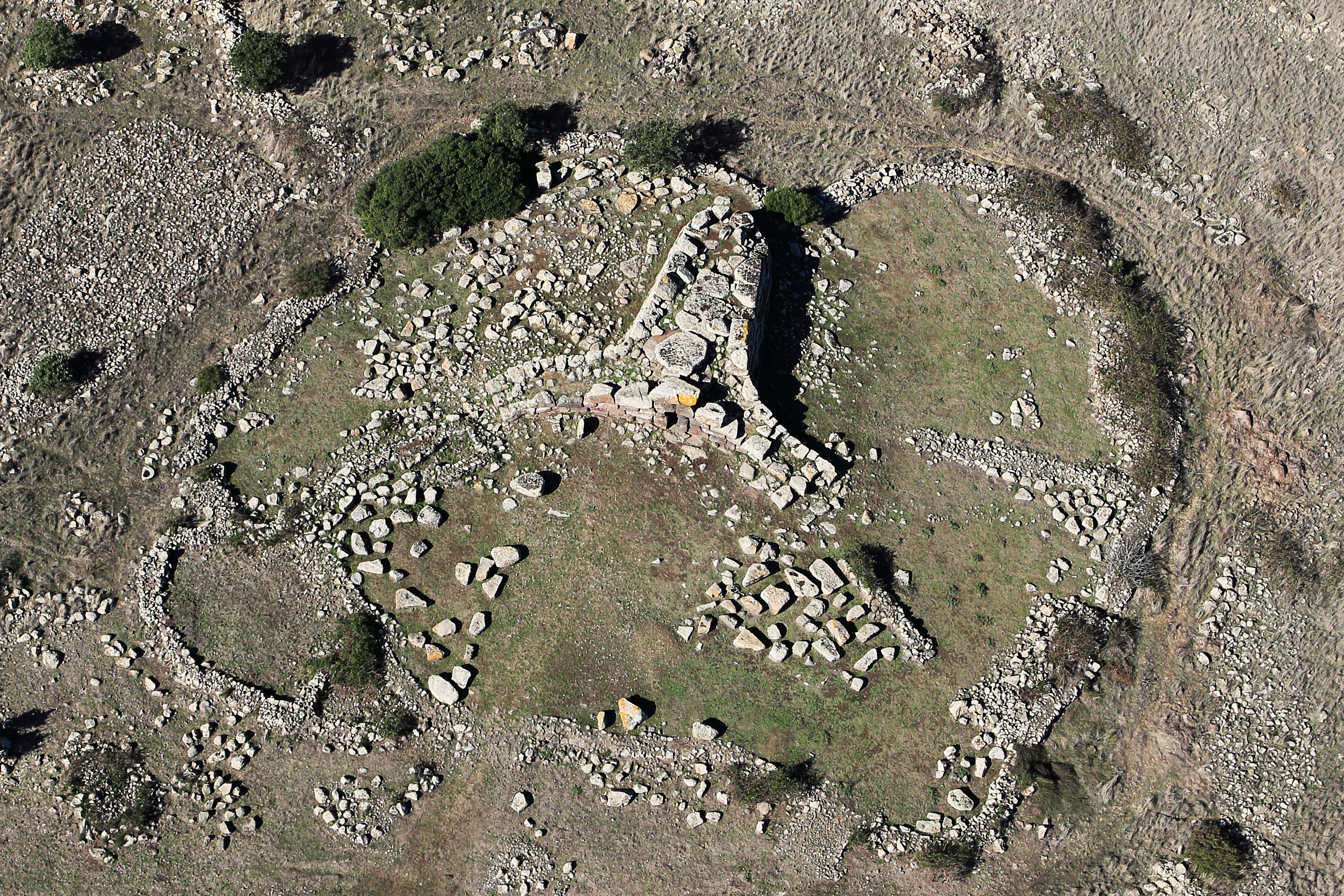
Aerial view of the Giant's grave of Sa Domu 'e S'Orcu in Siddi.

Giants' grave (Italian: tomba dei giganti; Sardinian: tumba de zigantes or gigantis) is the name given by local people and archaeologists to a type of Sardinian megalithic gallery grave built during the Bronze Age by the Nuragic civilization. They were collective tombs and can be found throughout Sardinia, with 800 being discovered there.

A stone cairn lies over the burial chambers, with some examples having a cup-shaped entrance similar to the court cairn tombs of Ireland.

== Types ==
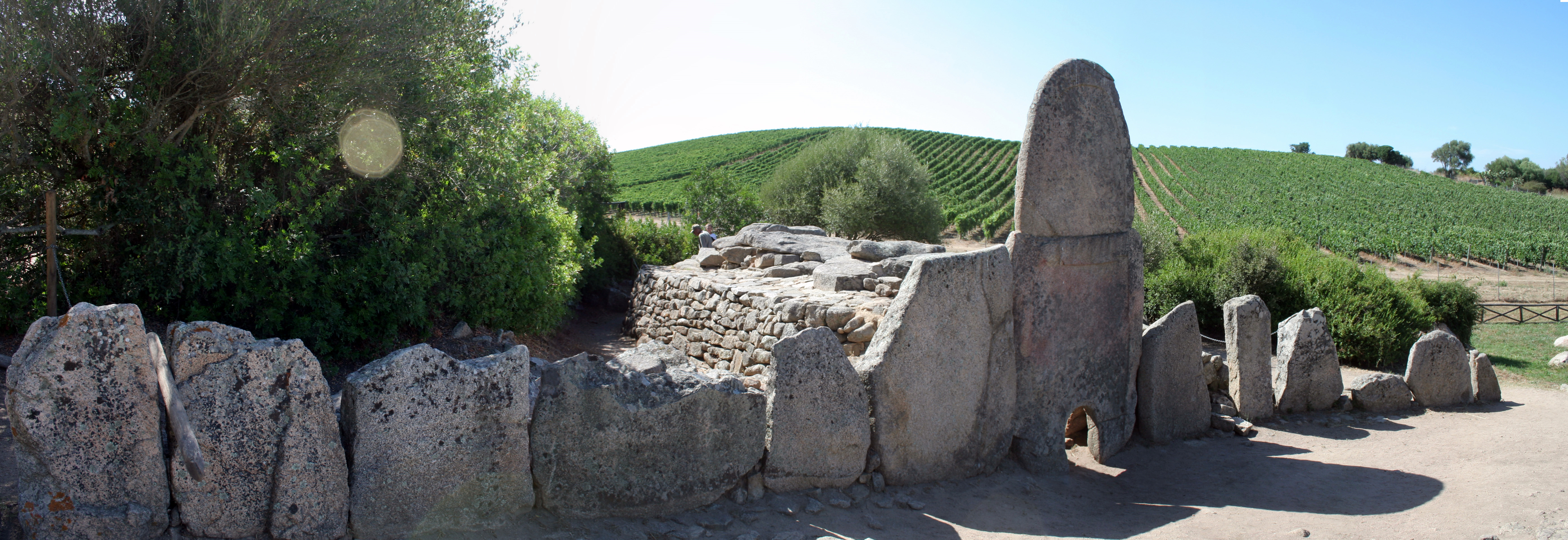
Coddu Vecchju - Arzachena

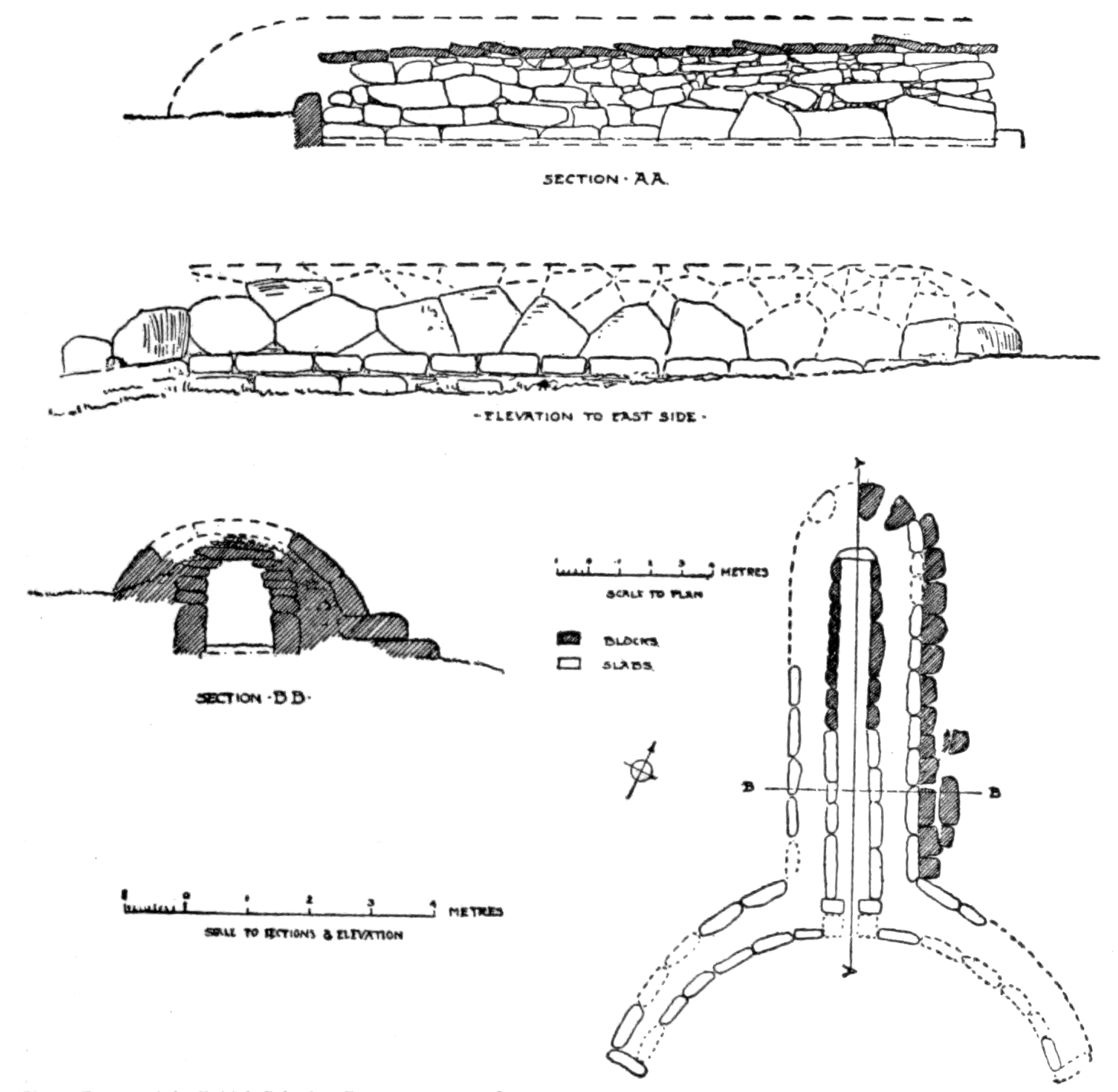
Plan and sections

There are two general types of giants' tomb. In the so-called "slab type", uncut slabs are buried on end in the ground, and are arranged side-by-side. There is usually a central stele, which is the largest slab (up to 4 m in height) and has a doorway cut through it.

In the more primitive slab-type giants tombs, the central slab is unmodified aside from the entrance that is cut through it at the base, or else there is a crude dolmen-like arrangement of 3 uncut rocks to form the entrance (Osono, Sortali, Lolghi, Pescaredda). In more advanced slab-type giants tombs, the central slab is modified so as to be rounded on top, and has a simple design carved into the front surface (Dorgali, Goronna, Santu Bainzu, Coddu Vecchju).

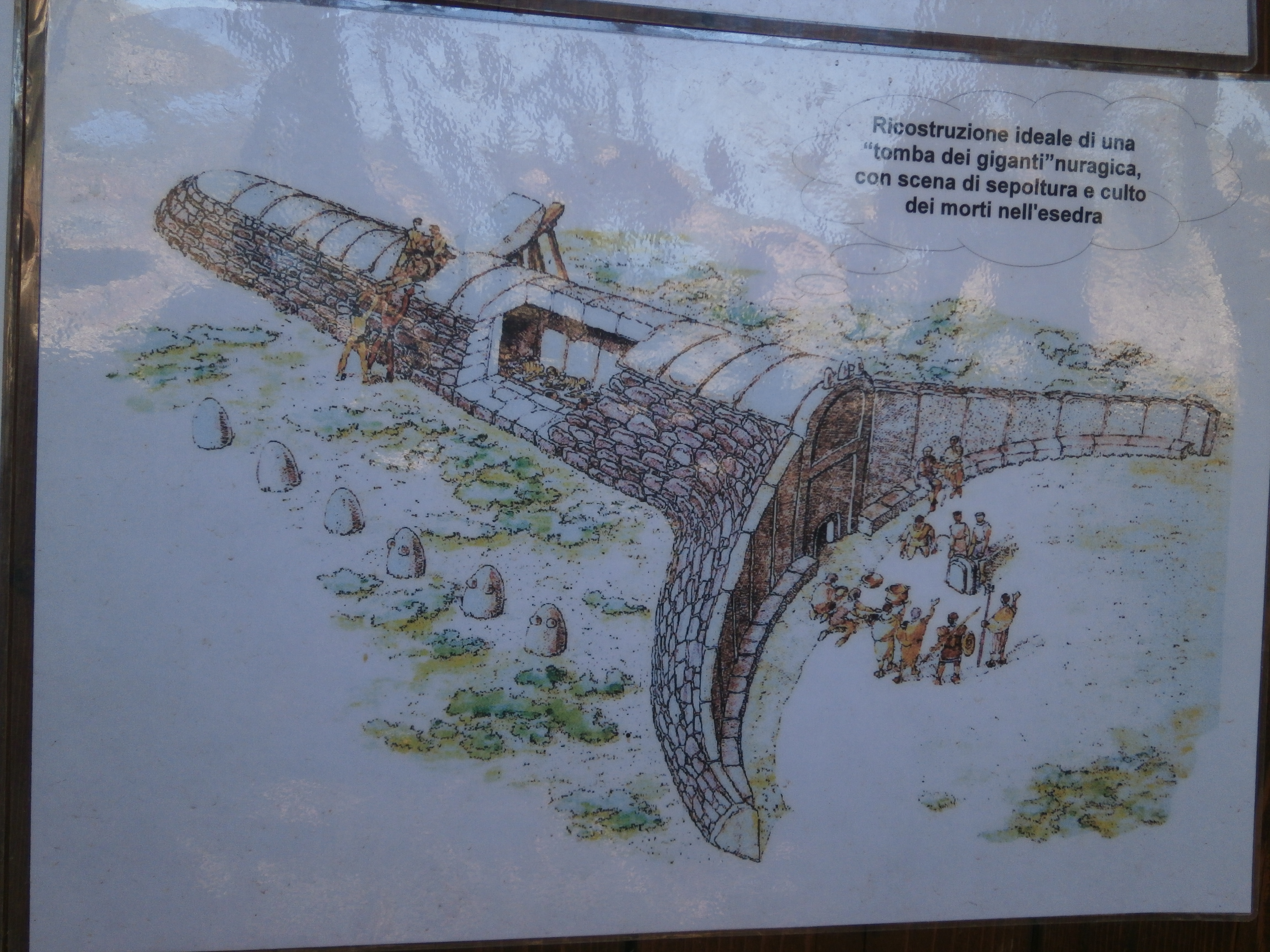
Graphic reconstruction

The sepulchres have a characteristic rectangular plan with an apse. The burial chamber is usually 5 to 15 metres long and 1 to 2 metres high. The structures were originally covered by a mound resembling the shape of an overturned ship. Near the entrance an obelisk (betile in Sardinian) is usually found, which symbolizes the regenerative cycle of rebirth after death.

The so-called "block type" tombs are made of rectangular-cut blocks (Bidistili, Madau II, Seleni II, Iloi, Mura Cuata).

There are also structures similar to the block-type giants tombs on the island of Malta, in the United Kingdom and in Menorca (naveta).

Geographical distribution of the Giant tombs in Sardinia

== List of major tombs ==
- Su Mont'e s'Abe, near Olbia
- Sa Dom'è s'Orcu, near Quartucciu
- Two 18th-century BC tombs near Lanusei
- Aiodda, near Nurallao
- Coddu Vecchiu and Li Lolghi, Arzachena
- Sa Dom'è s'Orcu, Siddi
- Imbertighe, Borore
- Madau, Fonni
- Muraguada, Bauladu
- Osono, near Triei
- Tomb of San Cosimo, near Gonnosfanadiga
- S'Ena'e Thomes, Dorgali
- Bainzu, Borore
- Sa Farch'e S'Artare, Seneghe

== See also ==
- Nuraghe
- Naveta

== Image gallery ==
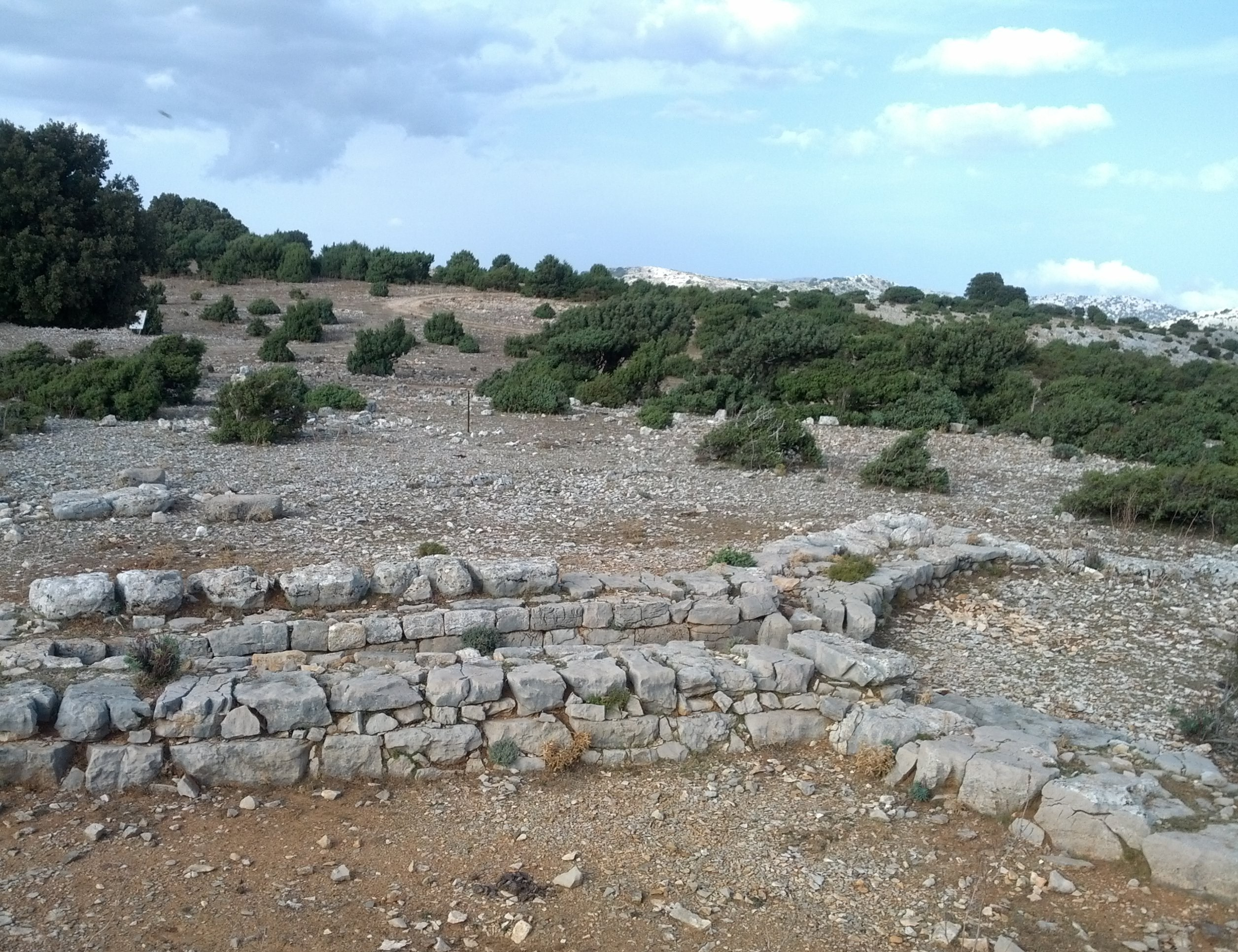
Giant's grave of S'Arena, Urzulei

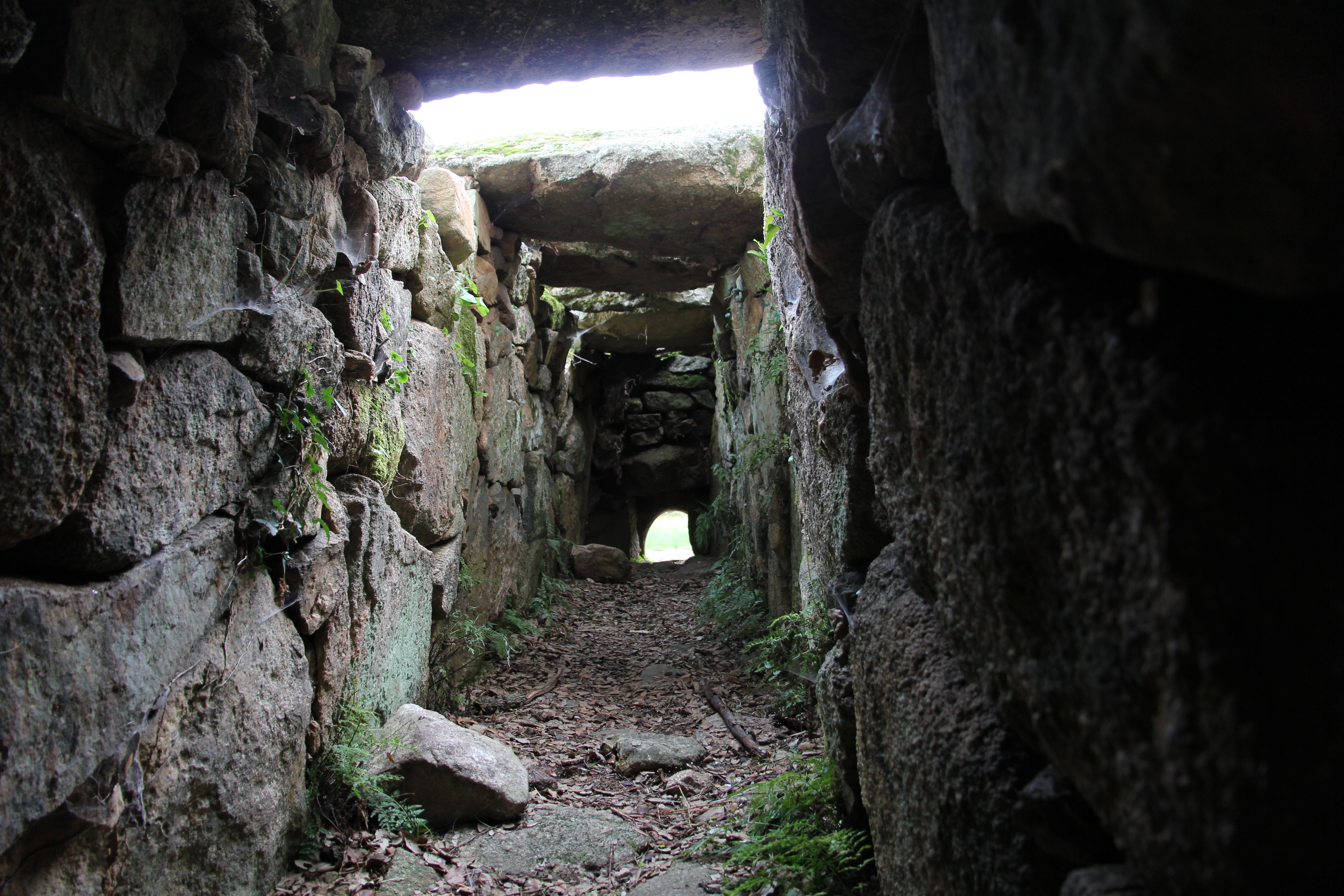
Giant's grave of Pascaredda, Calangianus

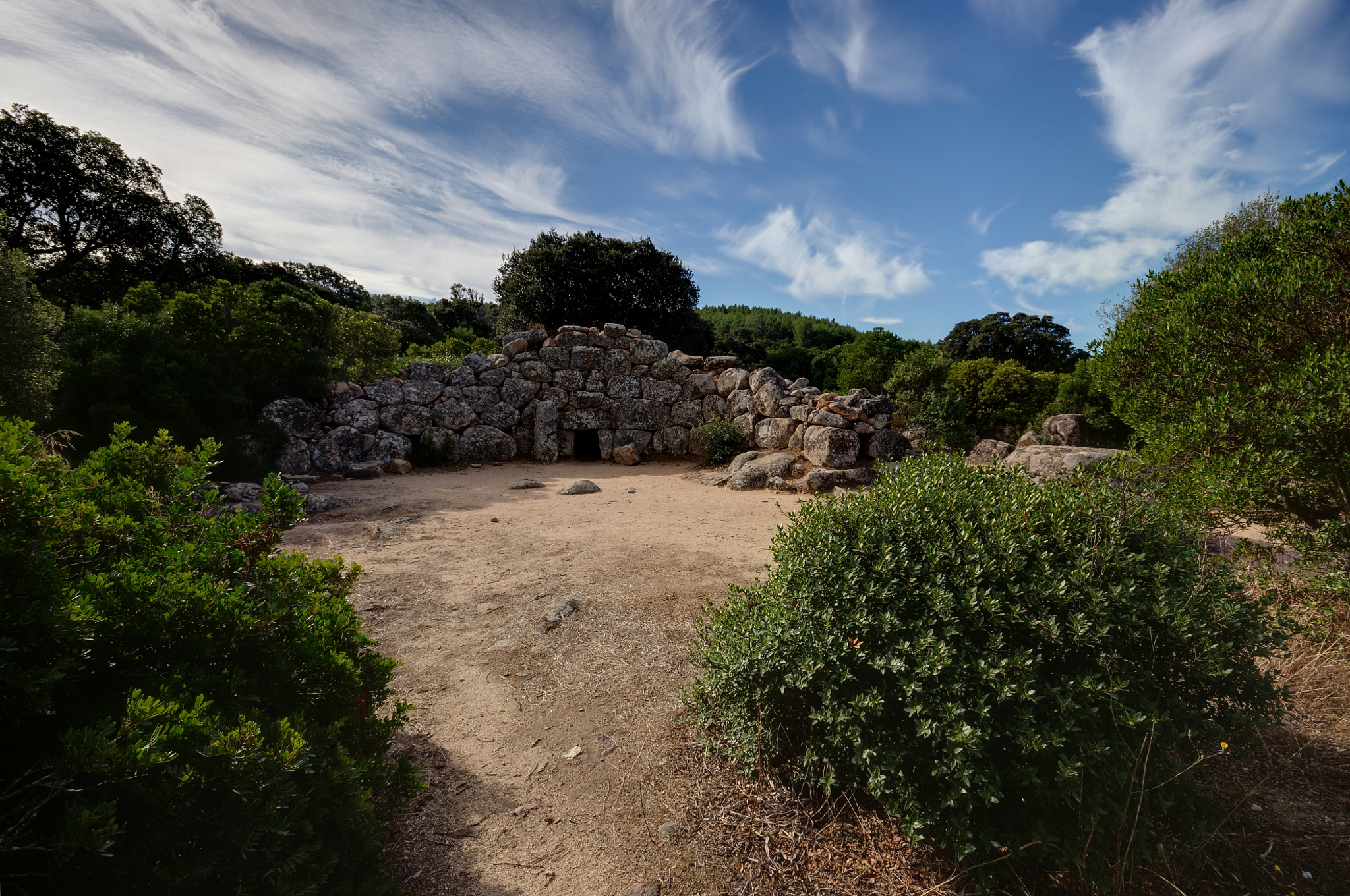
Giant's grave of Is Concias, Quartucciu

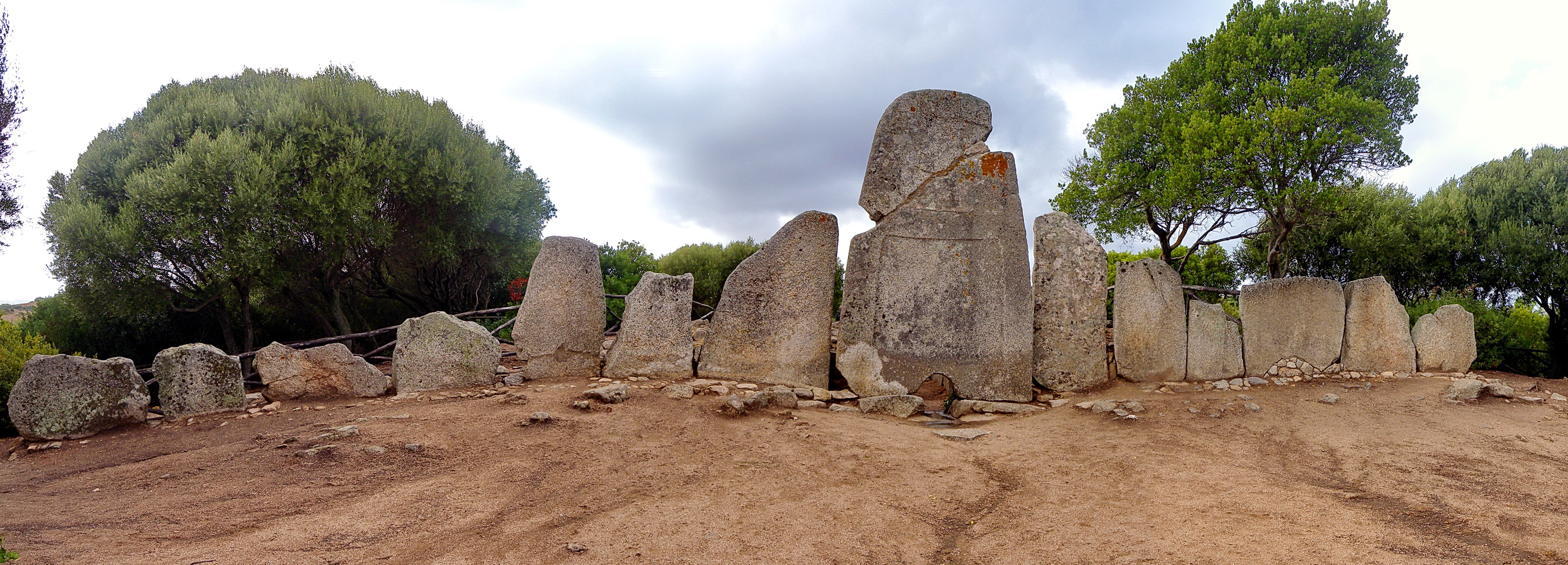
Giant's grave of Li Lolghi, Arzachena

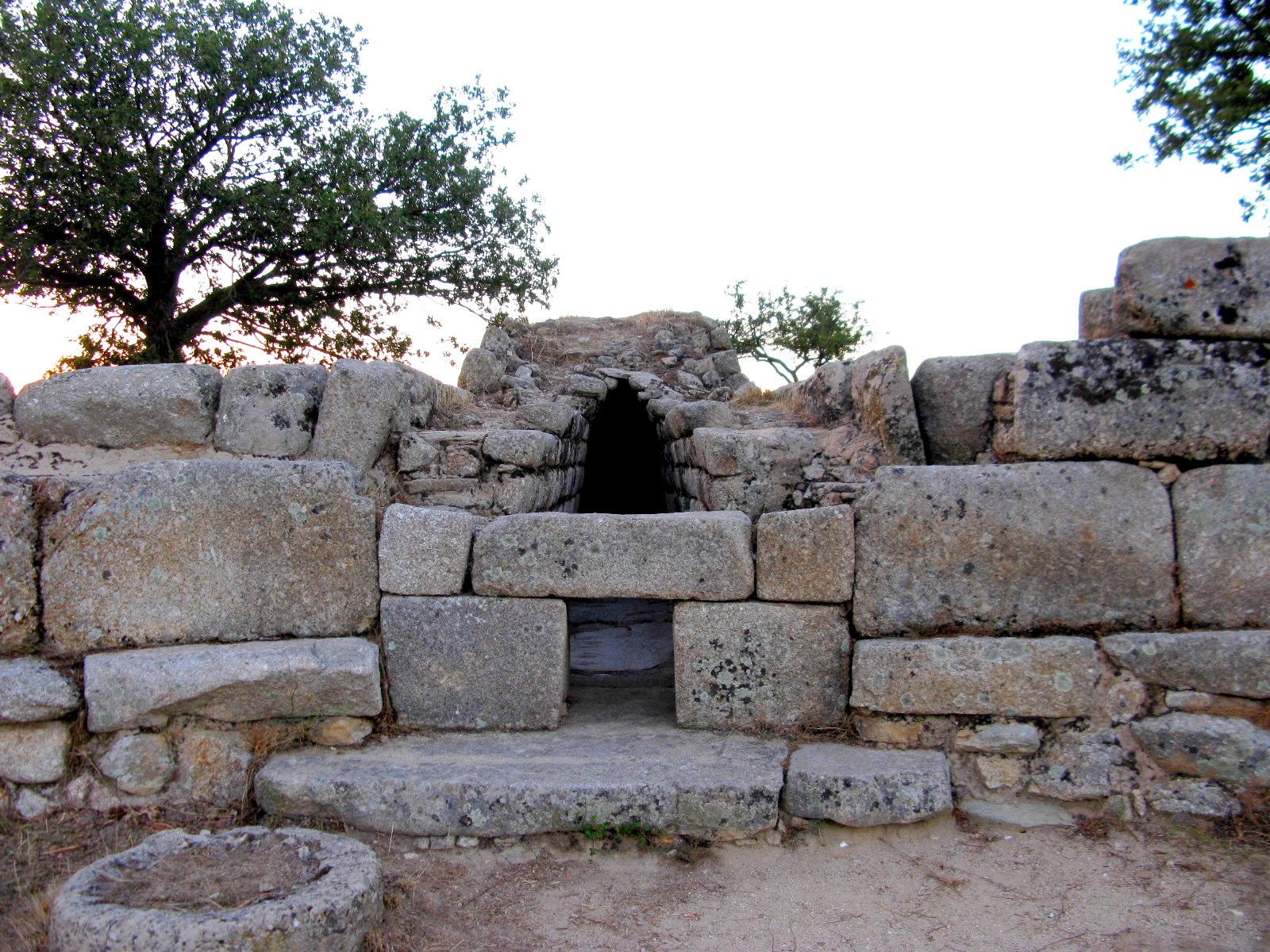
Giant's grave of Madau, Fonni

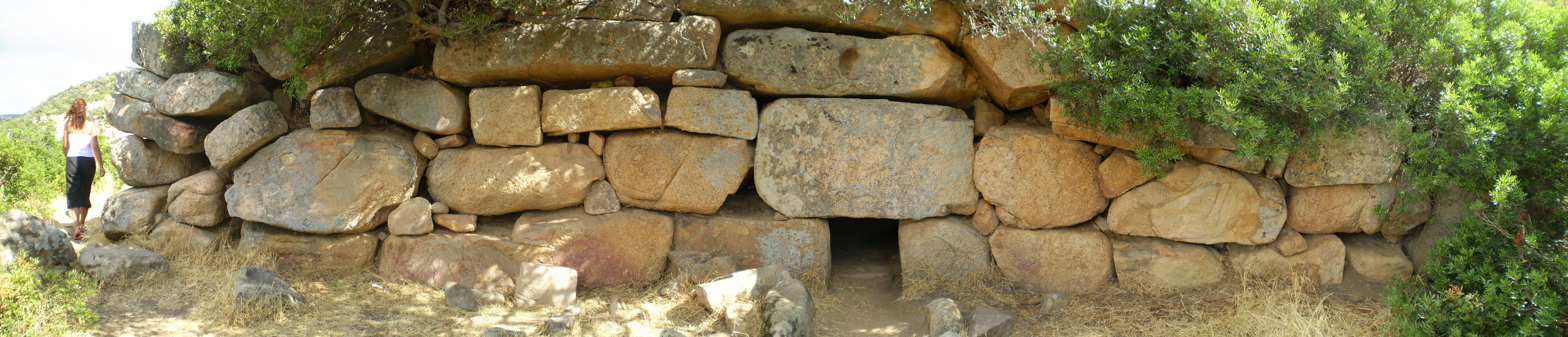
Giant's grave of Barrancu Mannu, Santadi

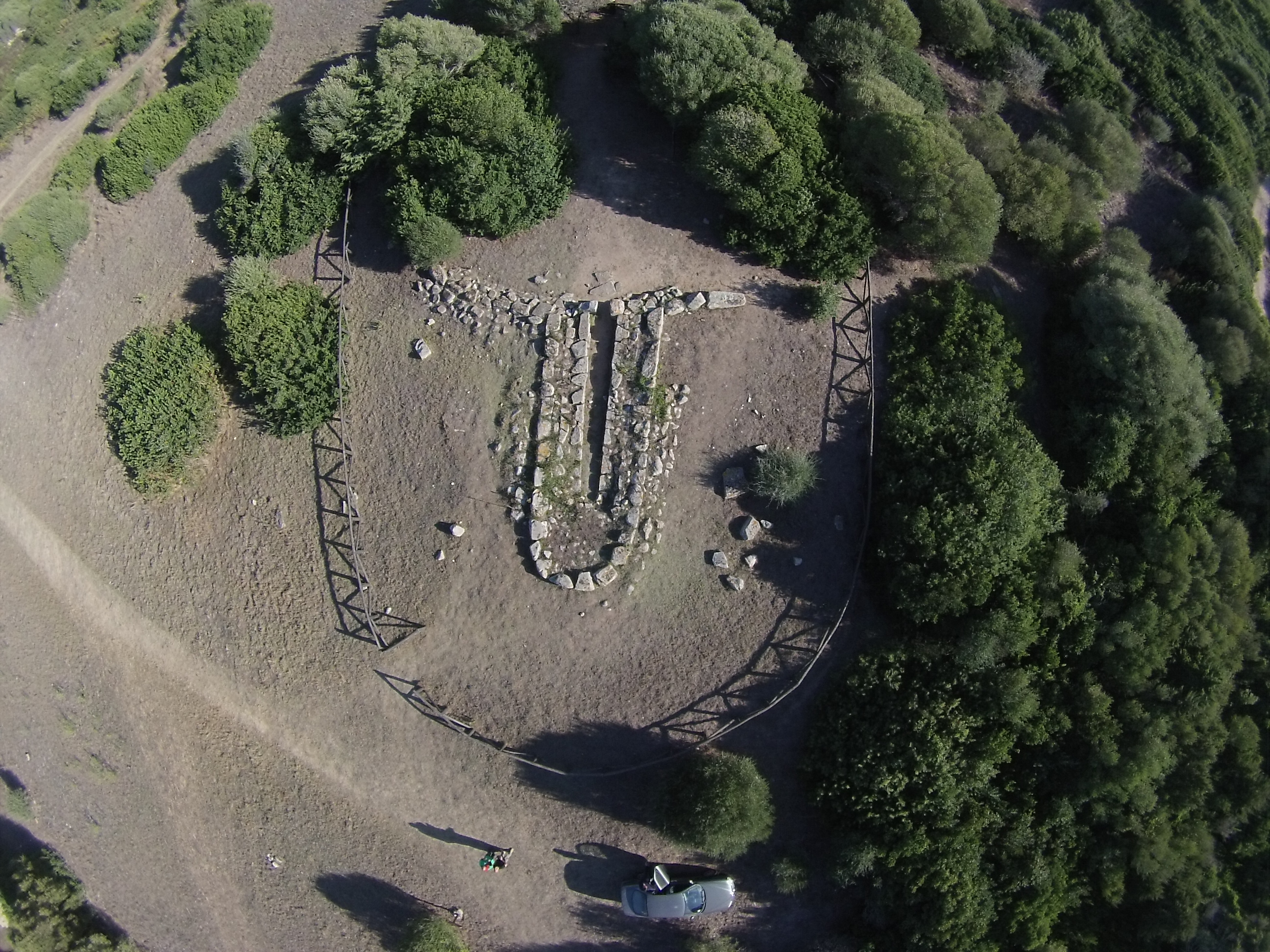
Giant's grave of Lu Brandali, Santa Teresa Gallura

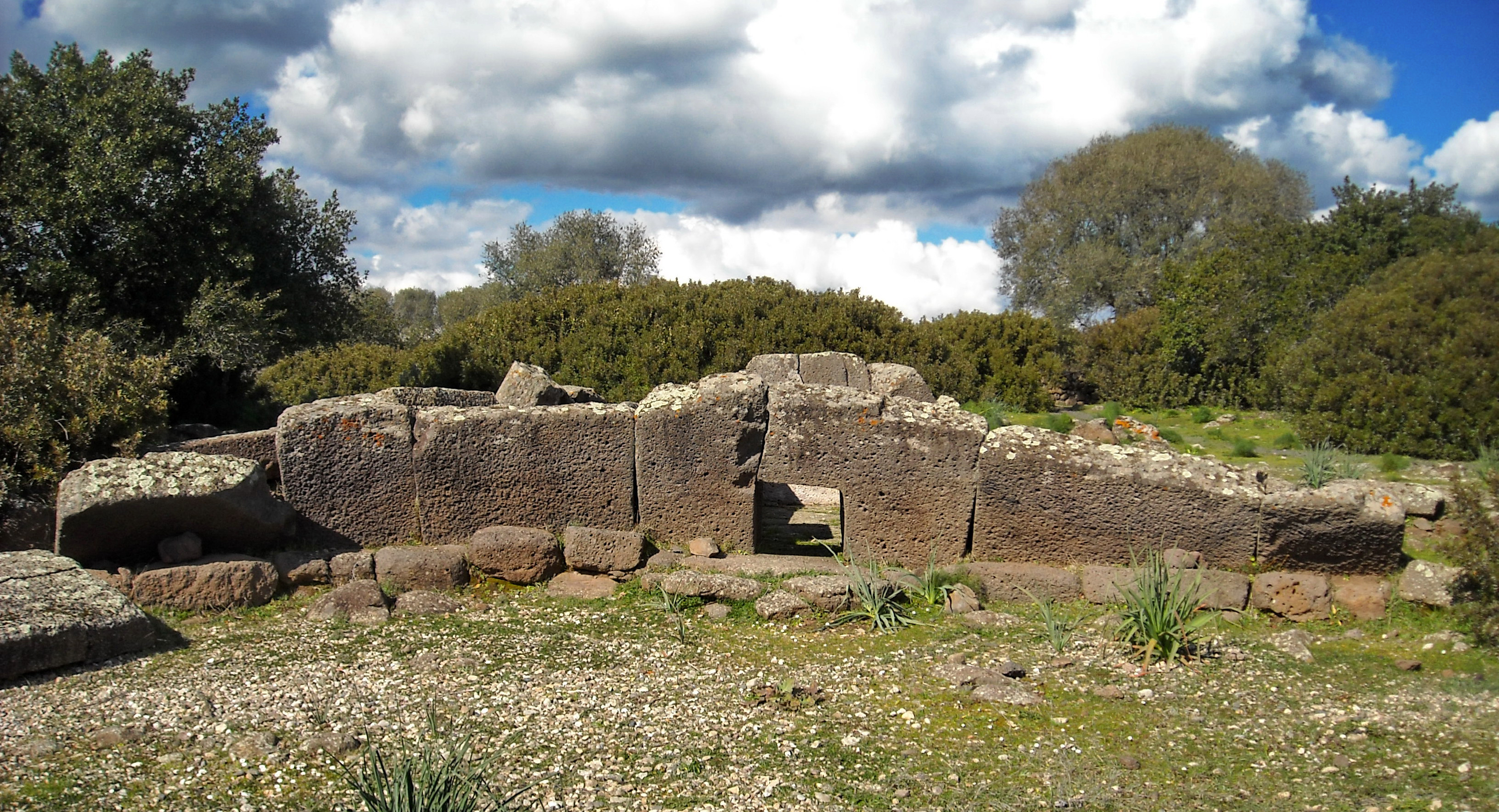
Iloi

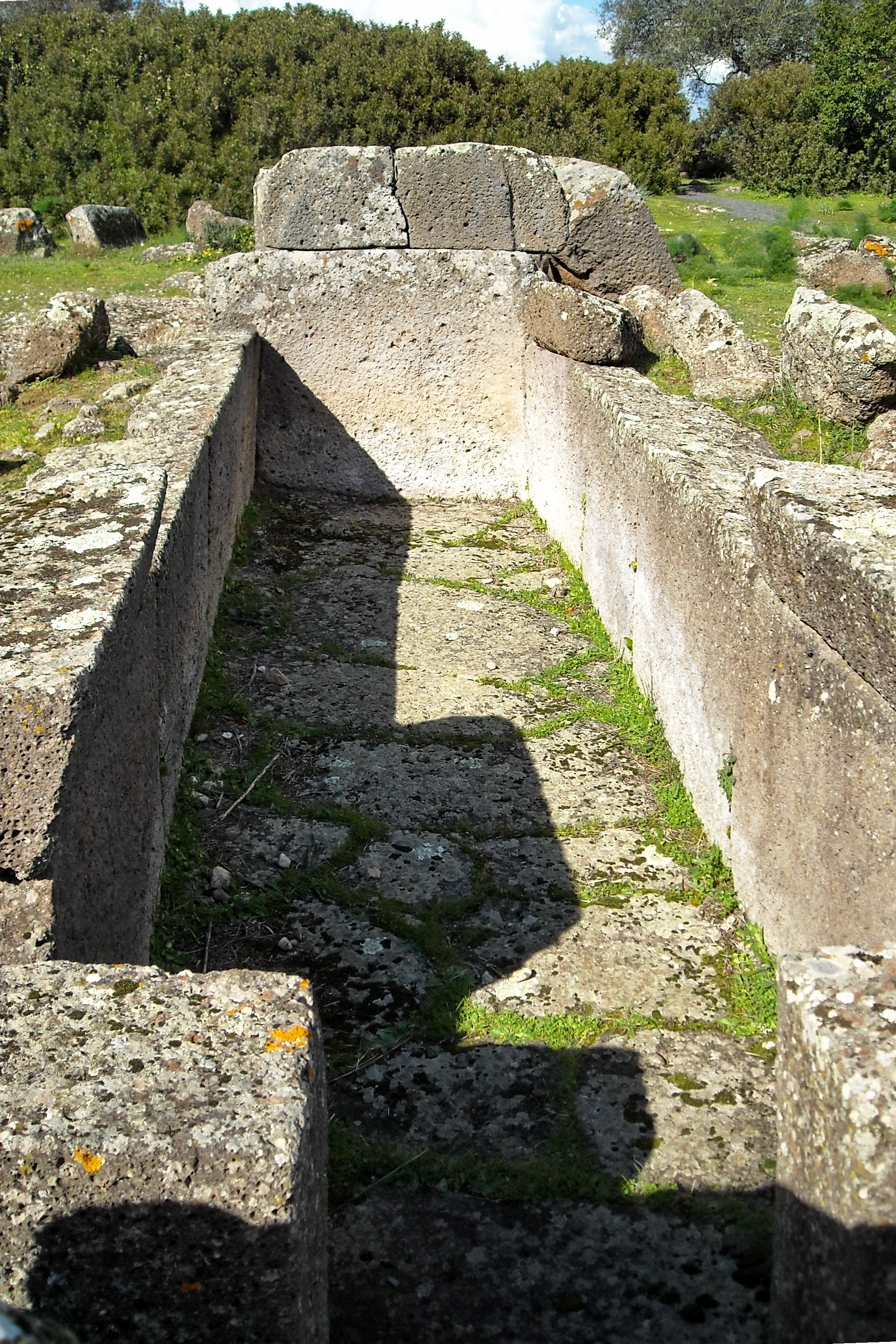
Iloi 2

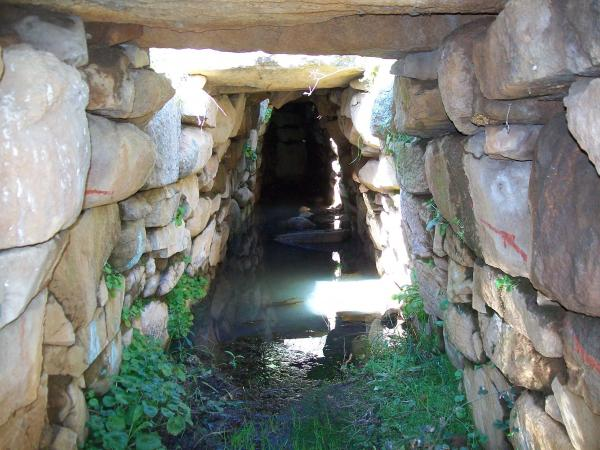
Giant's grave of San Cosimo, Gonnosfanadiga
