= Giants' grave of Coddu Vecchiu =

Archeological site in Italy

Coddu Vecchiu
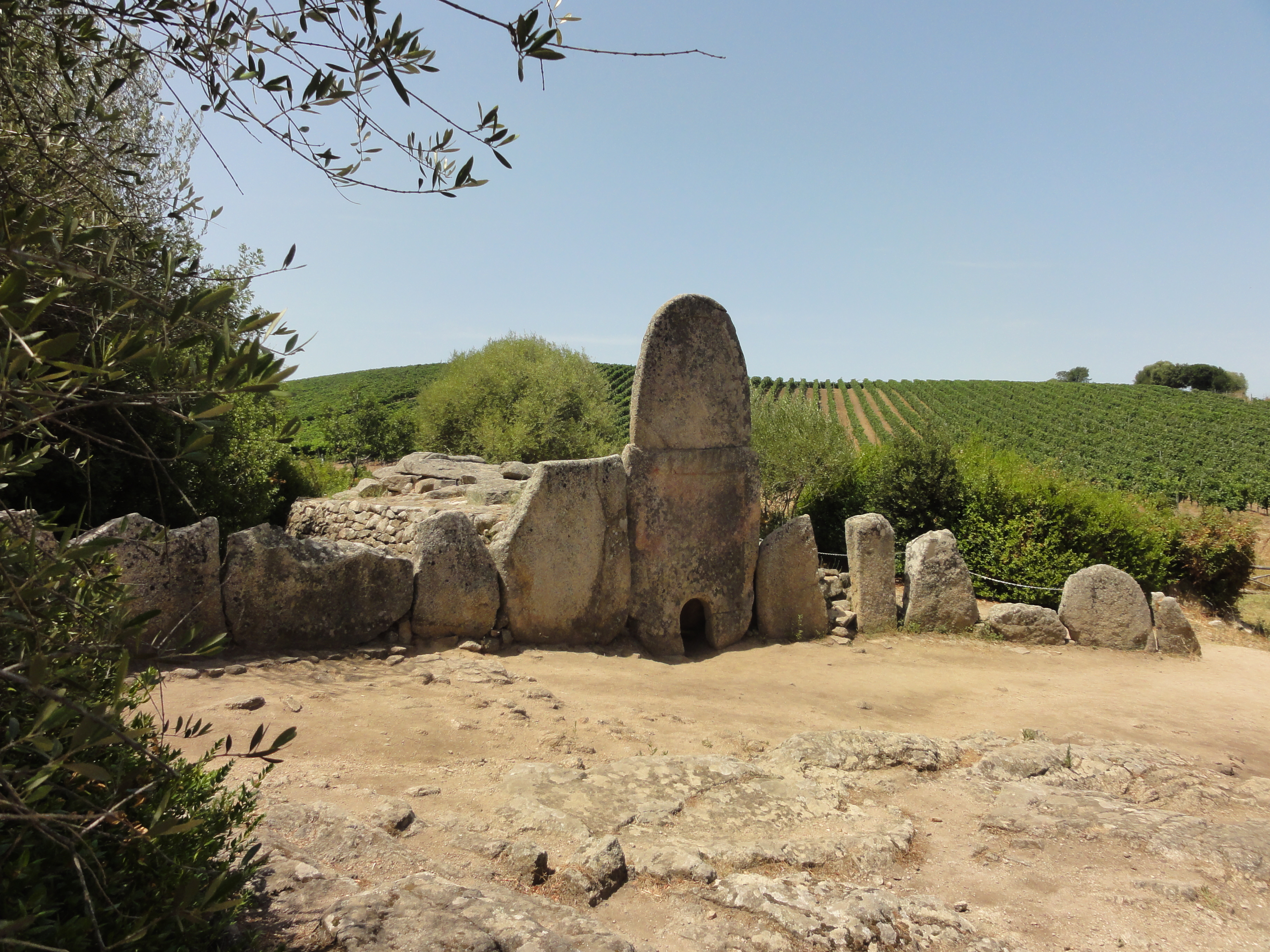
- The monument in 2013

- Location in Sardinia, Italy
- 41.05025°N 9.3558°E
- Type: Monument
- Cultures: Nuragic civilization
- Location: Sardinia, Italy

History
- Built: c. 1700 BC

Site notes
- Material: Granite
- Height: 4 m (13 ft)
- Excavation dates: 1966
- Archaeologists: Editta Castaldi
- Condition: ruined
- Management: I Beni Culturali della Sardegna
- Public access: yes
- Website: Arzachena, tomba di giganti di Coddu Vecchiu (in Italian)

Coddu Vecchiu is a Nuragic funerary monument located near Arzachena in northern Sardinia, dating from the Bronze Age. The site consists of a stele, stone megaliths, and a gallery grave, and is one of the larger Nuragic Giants' graves on the island. The Nuraghe La Prisgiona is located nearby.

== History ==
The site was excavated in 1966 by Editta Castaldi. Among the artifacts recovered were pans, bowls, and plates with comb decoration, as well as vases with bent necks, and vase fragments of the early Nuragic Bonnanaro culture, suggesting the monument was constructed early in the Nuragic period c. 1800–1600 BC.

Coddu Vecchiu appears to have originally consisted of a cist, which was expanded during the middle Bronze Age c. 1800–1600 BC and covered with a gallery grave and the ornate stele portal stone and megaliths characteristic of Giants' graves. The stone forecourt consists of 11 granite stones arranged in a semicircle and measures about 12 meters (39 feet) across. It has been hypothesized that the semicircular arrangement of the stones may have been an attempt to harness the telluric current of the granite for rejuvenative purposes. The central stele stands about 4 meters (13 feet) high and contains the entrance into the tomb. The gallery grave extends behind the forecourt, measures about 10 meters (33 feet) long, and was probably once covered by a tumulus.

The upper portion of the stele was once taken by a local farmer and used as a plow, but it was soon recovered and restored to its place in the monument. Coddu Vecchiu is among the most well-preserved of Giants' graves, and continues to be a popular tourist attraction.

== Notes ==
- The monument is visible on Google map satellite view and on street view.

== Gallery ==
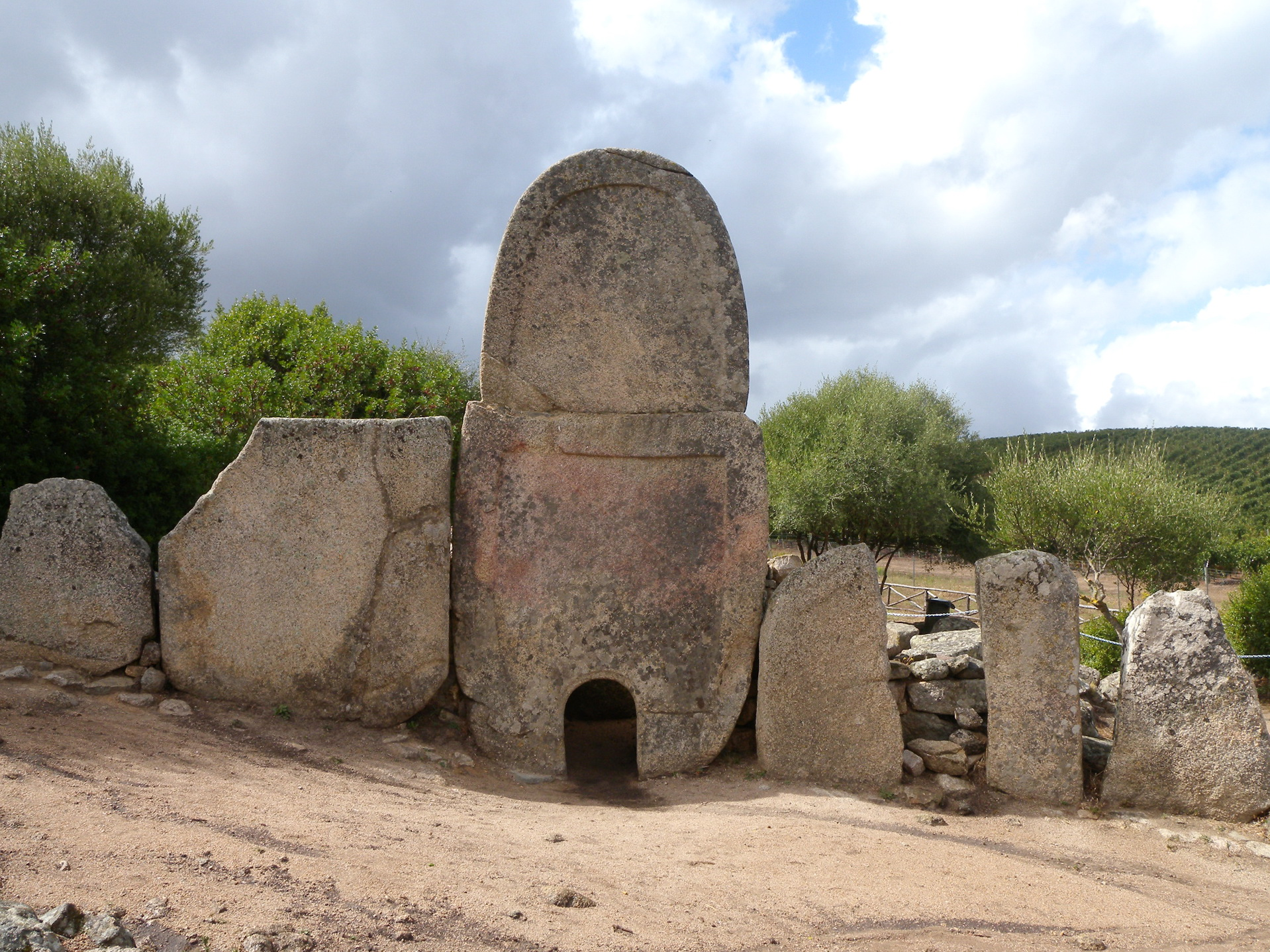
The stele consists of two large stones carved in bas-relief and contains the entrance to the tomb

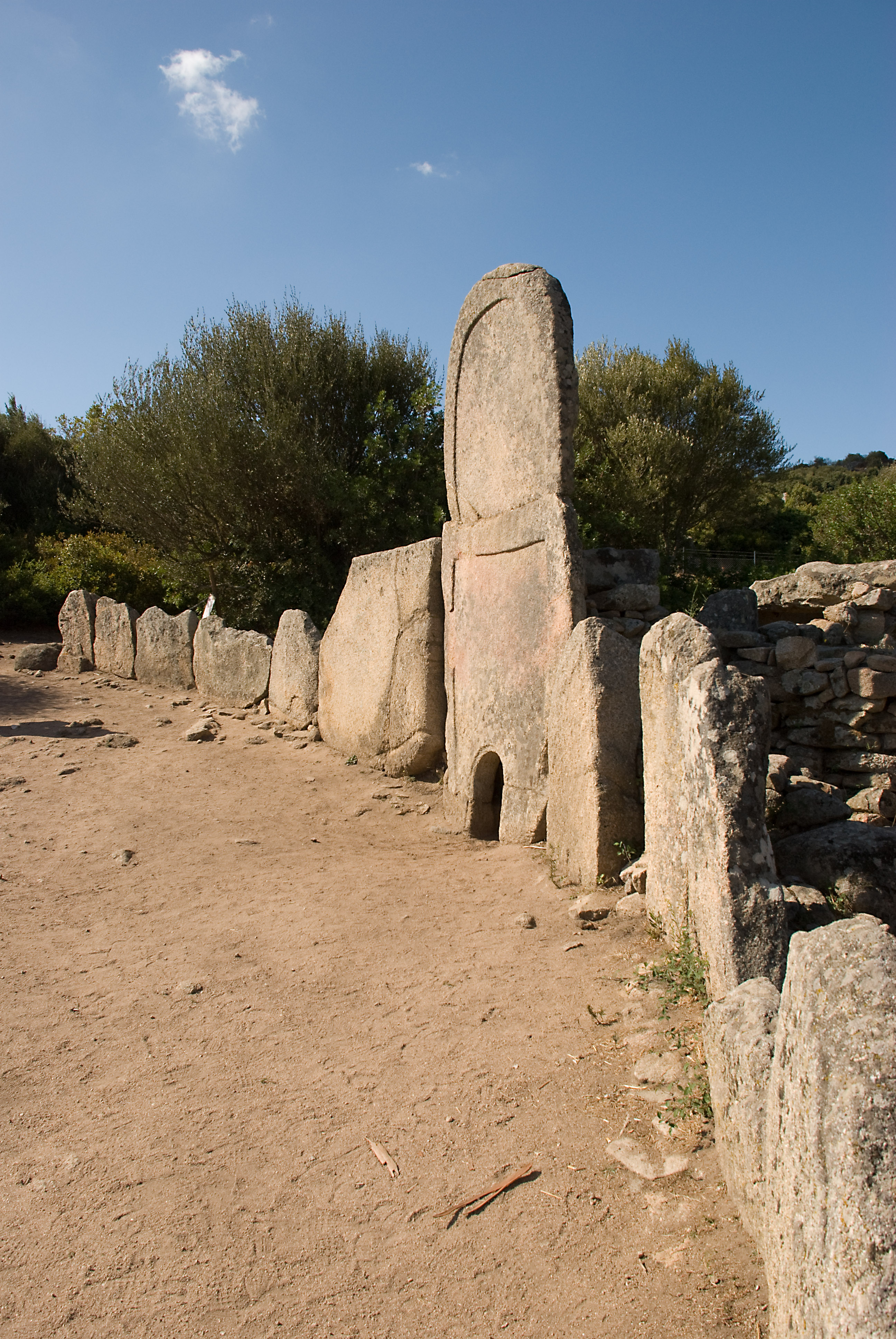
The megaliths of the forecourt form a semicircle

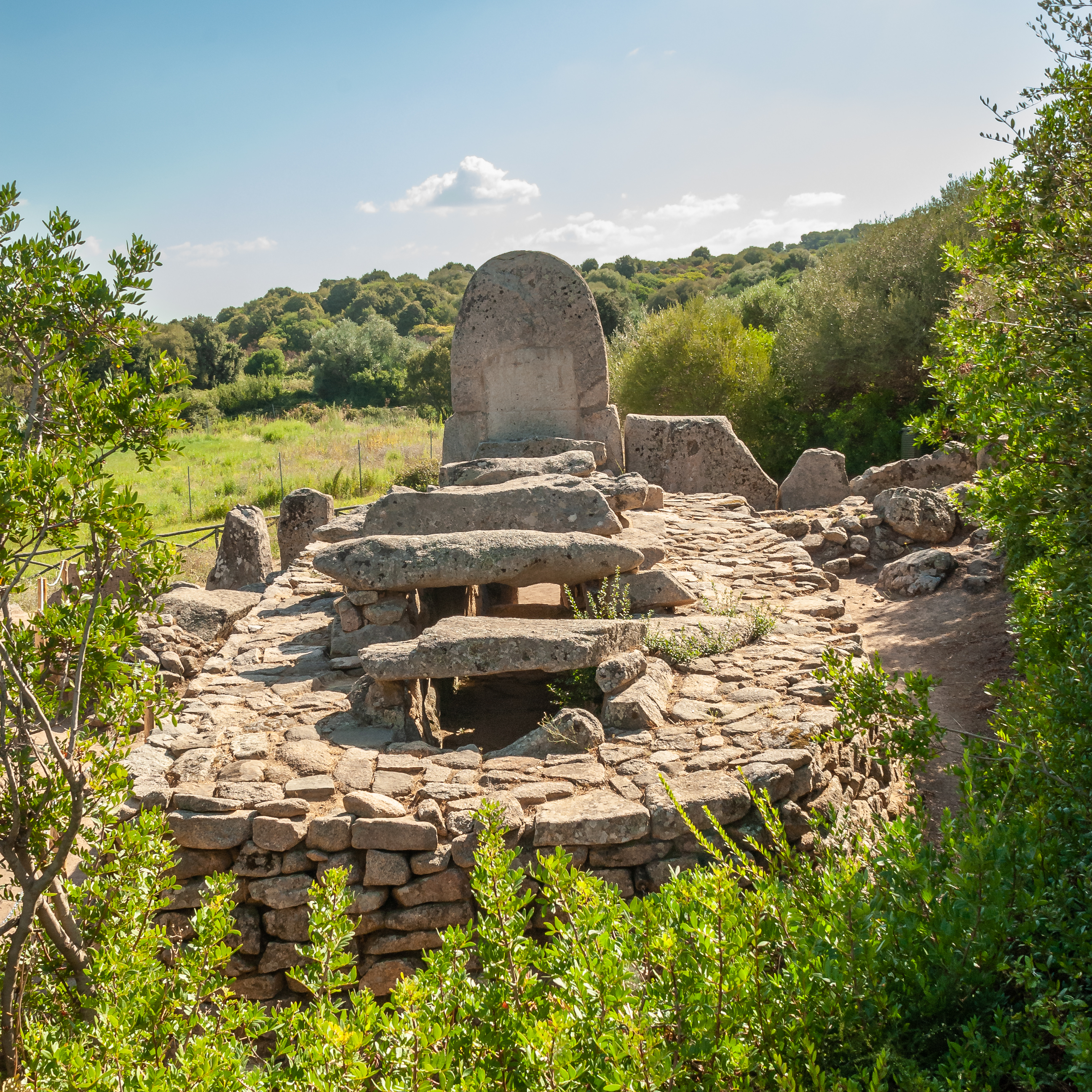
View of the gallery grave from the back

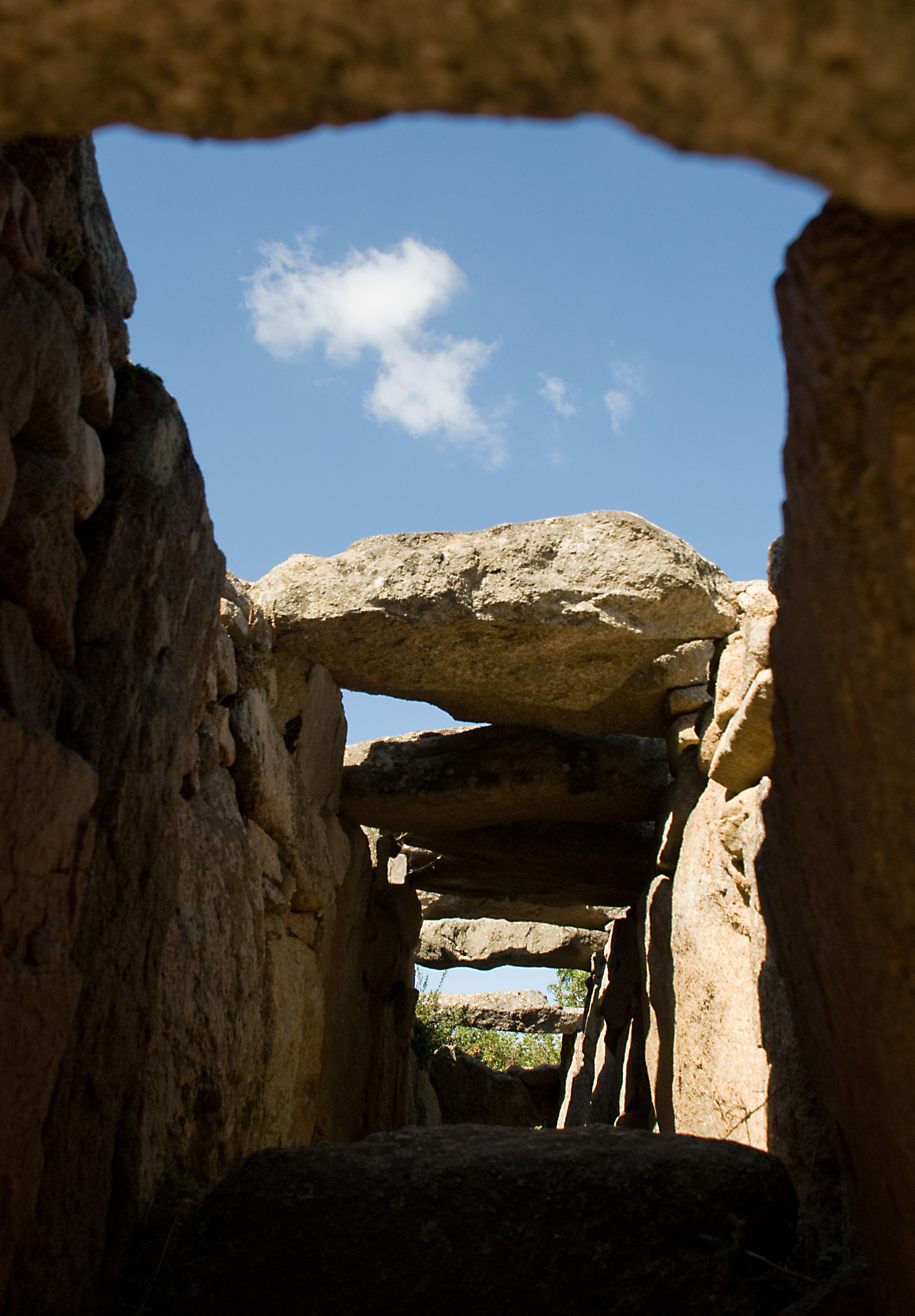
Interior of gallery grave

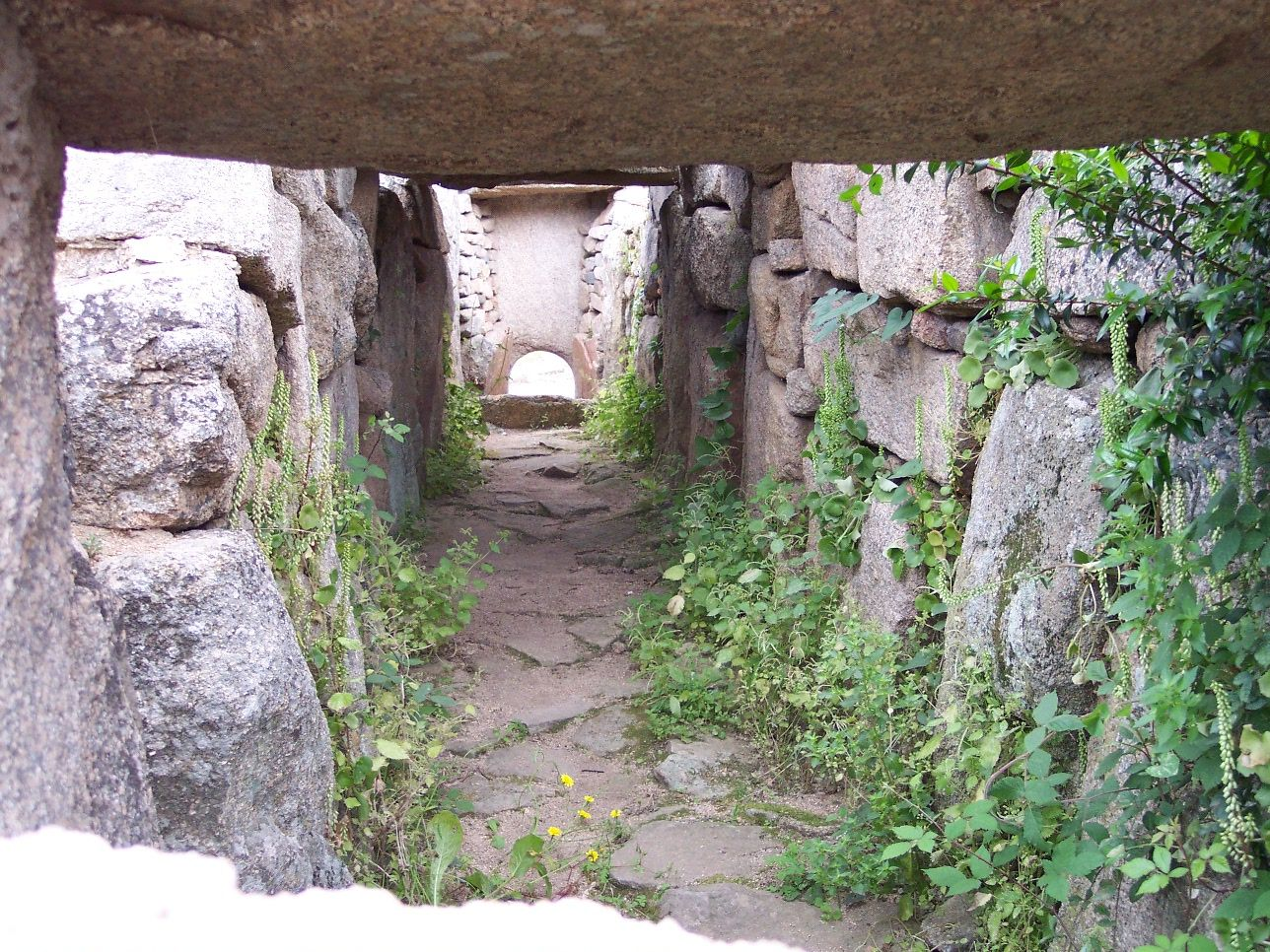
Interior of gallery grave

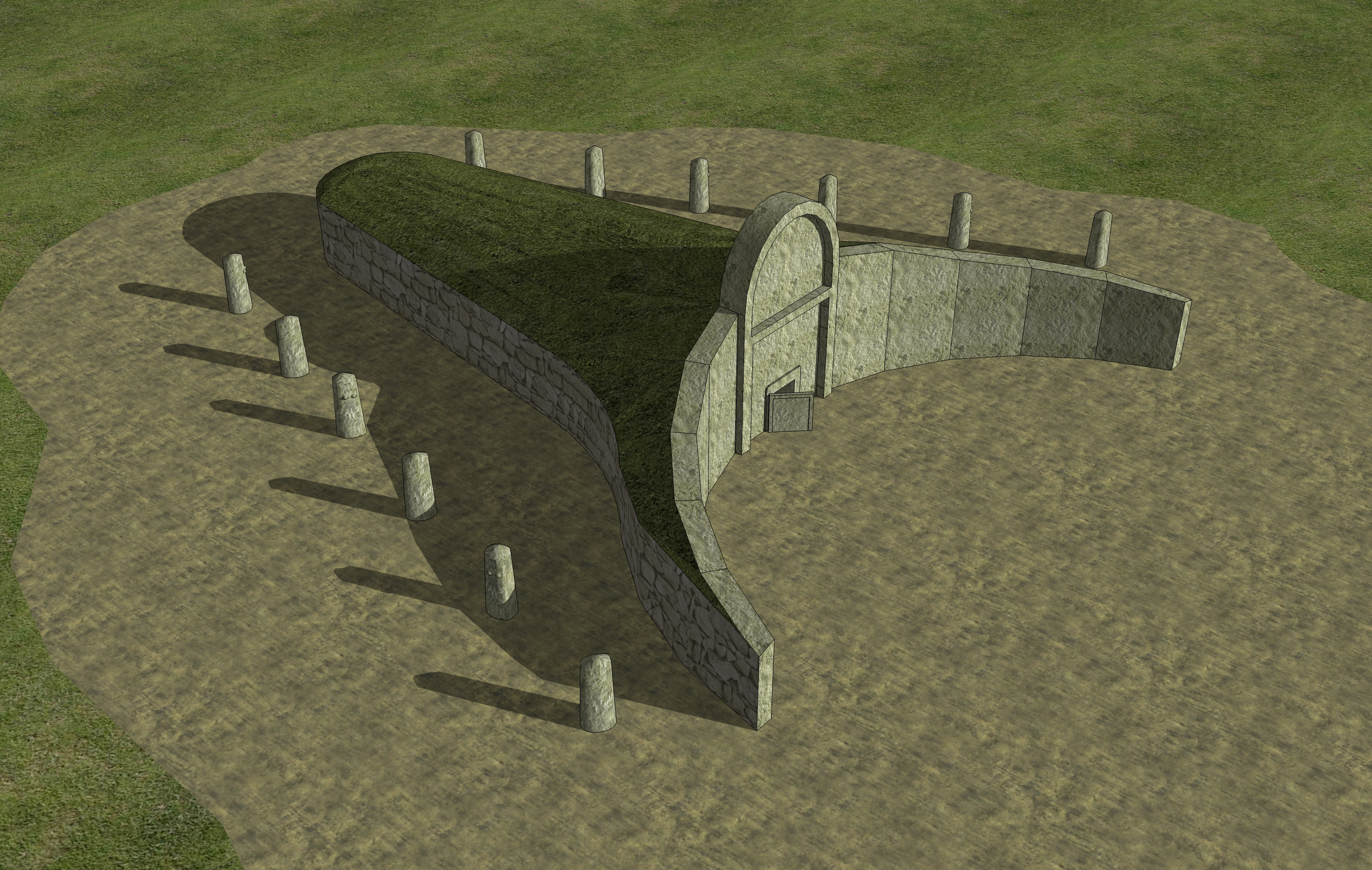
A 3D model of how the site may have once looked
