= S'acqua 'e is dolus =

Archaeological site in Sardinia, Italy

Coordinates: 39°18′36″N 9°10′42″E

S'acqua 'e is dolus is an excavation in the rocks, a so-called Domu de janas (house of the fairies), in the neighbourhood of Settimo San Pietro, Province of Cagliari, Sardinia, Italy, constructed in the period 3400-2700 BC.

It consists of two rooms connected by an opening of less than 1 metre (3.3 ft), the same width as the entrance. Water from a nearby source enters the rooms and according to a popular tradition, not only is the water safe for drinking, but it also heals pain, from which comes the name of the cave "water that heals pain".

According to popular legend, Saint Peter stayed over at the cave and prayed so long that he left the imprints of his knees in the rocks. In the past, this event was commemorated annually on the 29th of June with a mass and benediction of the water. More recently, the celebration has taken place in early September.
