= Monserrato =

Monserrato Paùli (Sardinian)
- Comune
- Comune di Monserrato
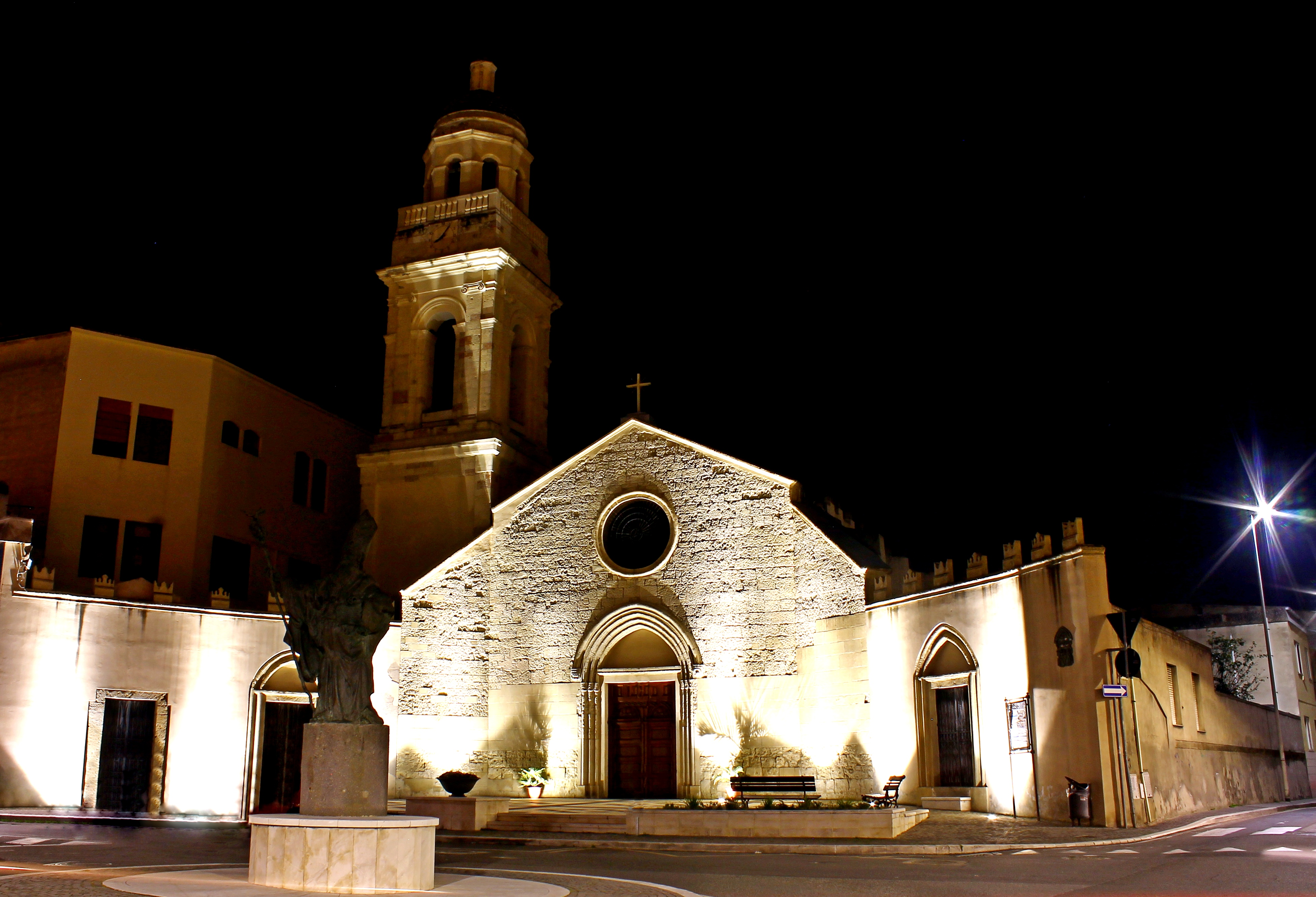
- Church of Sant'Ambrogio

- Coat of arms

- Location within Sardinia
- Coordinates: 39°15′N 9°9′E
- Country: Italy
- Region: Sardinia
- Metropolitan city: Cagliari (CA)

Government
  - Mayor: Tomaso Antonio Locci

Area
  - Total: 6.43 km^{2} (2.48 sq mi)
- Elevation: 2 m (6.6 ft)

Population (2026)
  - Total: 18,624
  - Density: 2,900/km^{2} (7,500/sq mi)
- Demonym: Monserratini
- Time zone: UTC+1 (CET)
  - Summer (DST): UTC+2 (CEST)
- Postal code: 09042
- Dialing code: 070
- Patron saint: St. Ambrose
- Saint day: December 7
- Website: Official website

Monserrato (Sardinian: Paùli) is a comune (municipality) in the Metropolitan City of Cagliari in the autonomous region of Sardinia in Italy, located about 5 kilometres (3 mi) northeast of Cagliari. It has a population of 18,624.

Monserrato borders the following municipalities: Cagliari, Quartu Sant'Elena, Quartucciu, Selargius, Sestu. Sights include the Gothic church of Sant'Ambrogio.

== History ==
In the Middle Ages, the village was known as Pauli (Sardinian language for marsh), and was part of the Giudicato of Cagliari. Later owned by the Republic of Pisa, the House of Aragon and the Giudicato of Arborea, it was depopulated by plague in 1348. Later it was a Spanish and then Savoyard fief.

Monserrato was an autonomous comune until 1928, when it was annexed to Cagliari. It remained a district of the latter until 1991, when it was separated with a local referendum. Since 1995, the town has been part of the newly instituted Cagliari metropolitan area.

== Demographics ==
As of 2026, the population is 18,624, of which 47.5% are male, and 52.5% are female. Minors make up 10.7% of the population, and seniors make up 29.8%.

Historical population

Year	Pop.	±%
1861	-	—
1871	-	—
1881	-	—
1901	-	—
1911	-	—
1921	-	—
1931	-	—
1936	-	—

Year	Pop.	±%
1951	13,143	—
1961	17,472	+32.9%
1971	21,284	+21.8%
1981	22,131	+4.0%
1991	20,578	−7.0%
2001	20,829	+1.2%
2011	20,449	−1.8%
2021	19,118	−6.5%

Source: ISTAT

=== Immigration ===
As of 2025, of the known countries of birth of 18,599 residents, the most numerous are: Italy (18,167 – 97.7%).
