= Giants' grave of Sa Dom'è s'Orcu (Quartucciu) =

Coordinates: 39°15′27″N 9°21′35″E

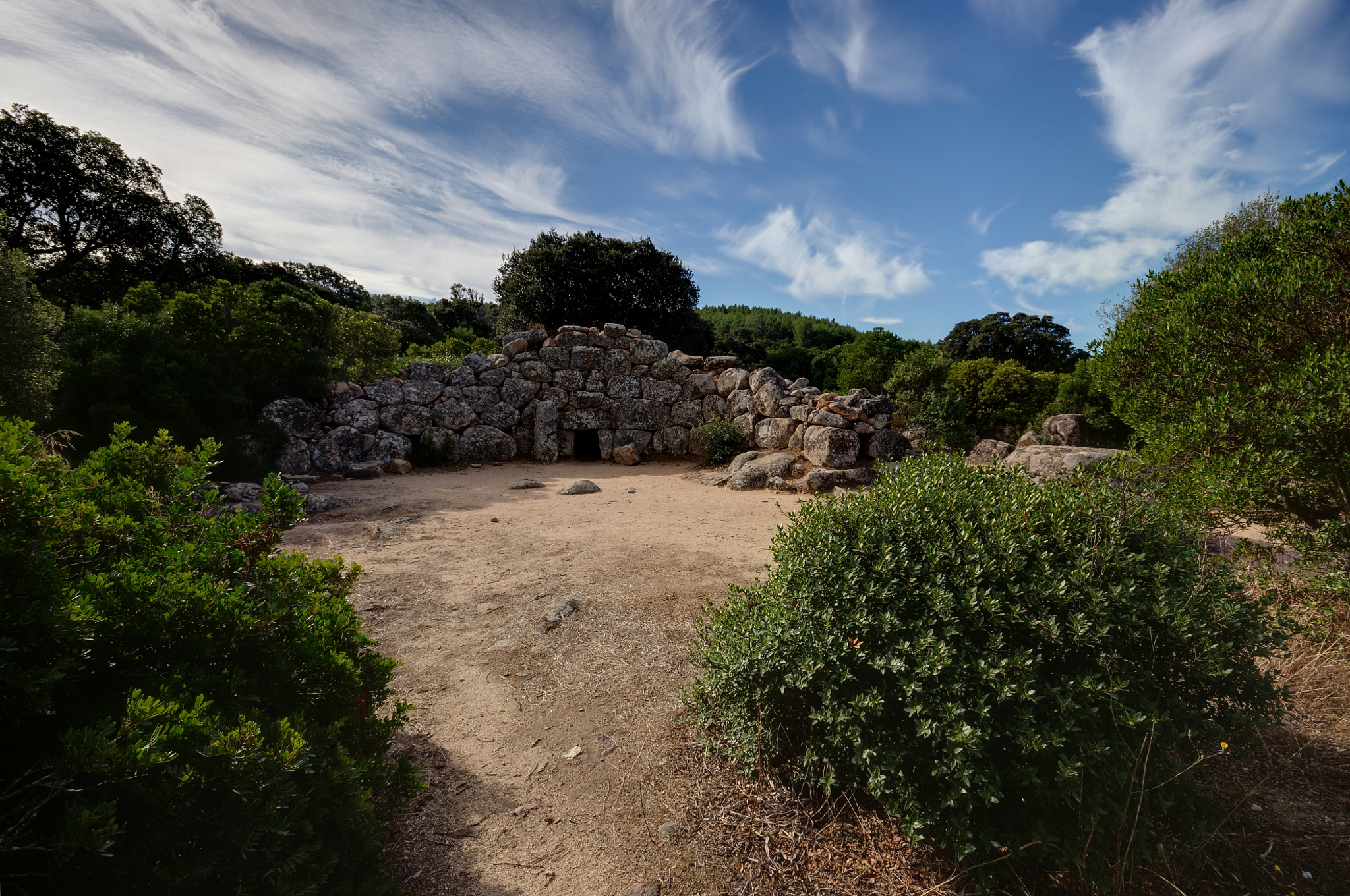
Giants' grave of Sa Dom'è s'Orcu

The giants' grave of Is Concias (also called Sa Dom'è s'Orcu) is an archaeological site of Quartucciu, municipality of the metropolitan City of Cagliari.

== Description ==
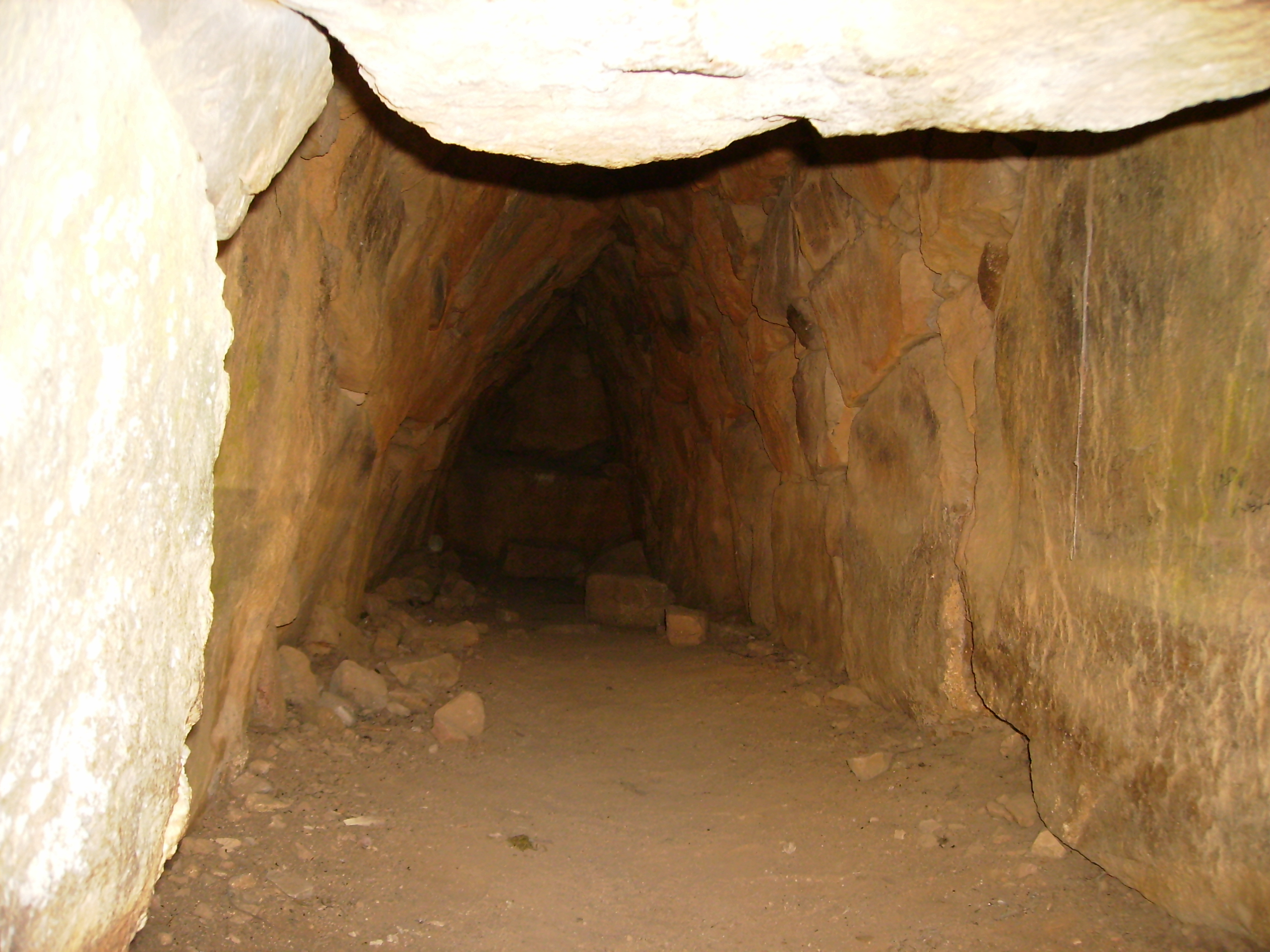
Interior of the tomb

Located on the western slope of the Sette Fratelli mountains, the tomb, dated to the middle and late Bronze Age, has, like most other tombs of the giants of southern Sardinia, the so-called "rows façade". It measures approximately 15.90 m in length and 1.30 m in width.

At the center of the exedra, about 10 meters wide, there is the entrance to the burial chamber of ogival shape, about 8 meters long and 1 m wide approx. The height of the burial chamber decreases from a maximum of 2.10 m at the entrance to a minimum of 1.70 m on the bottom.

Outside, on the right side of the entrance, there is a "betile", probably a deity.

== Archaeological excavations ==
The tomb was excavated in the 1960s by archaeologist Enrico Atzeni and restored in 1987.
