= Giants' grave of Su Mont'e s'Abe =

Archaeological site in Sassari, Italy

Coordinates: 40.8757°N 9.4840°E

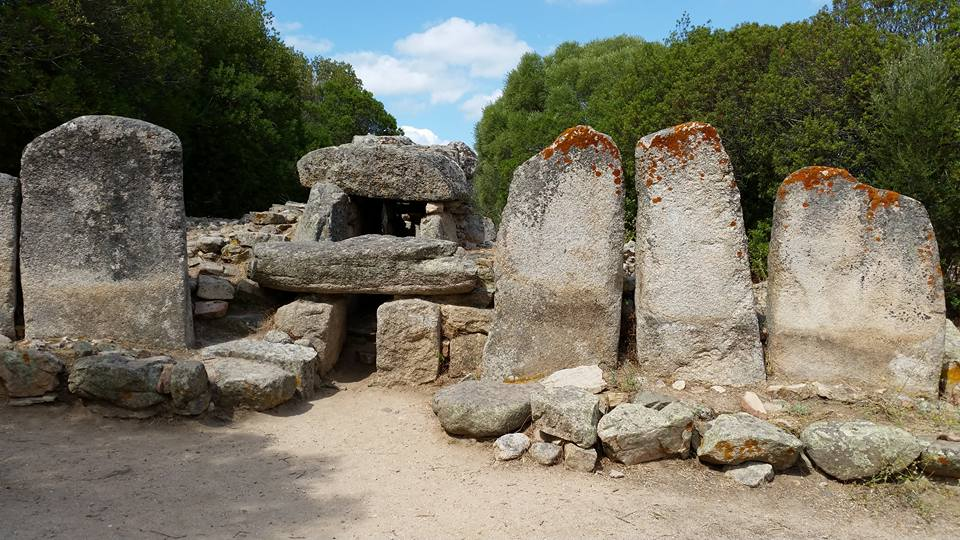
Su Mont'e e s'Abe

The Giants' grave of Su Mont'e s'Abe is an archaeological site located in the municipality of Olbia, in the Italian province of Sassari.

Like other giants' tombs of Gallura, it was built in two main phases of construction. In the first stage, during the period of the Bonnanaro culture, it was built an allée couverte tomb; later, in the second phase, during the age Nuragic age (1600 BC approximately), the allée couverte was transformed into a giants' tomb with the realization of the exedra and the erection of the central stele of which few traces remain today.

The tomb, which measures about 28 meters in length and six in width, was excavated and restored in the 1960s.

== Bibliography ==
- Giovanni Lilliu: Sculture della Sardegna nuragica. Edizioni La Zattera, Cagliari 1966.
- Giovanni Lilliu: Betili e betilini nelle tombe di giganti della Sardegna. Accademia nazionale dei Lincei, Roma 1995, ISBN 88-218-0499-2, (Atti della Accademia Nazionale dei Lincei, Storiche e Filologiche: Memorie Ser. 9, Vol. 6, Fasc. 4).
