= Quartucciu =

Quartucciu Cuartùcciu (Sardinian)
- Comune
- Comune di Quartucciu
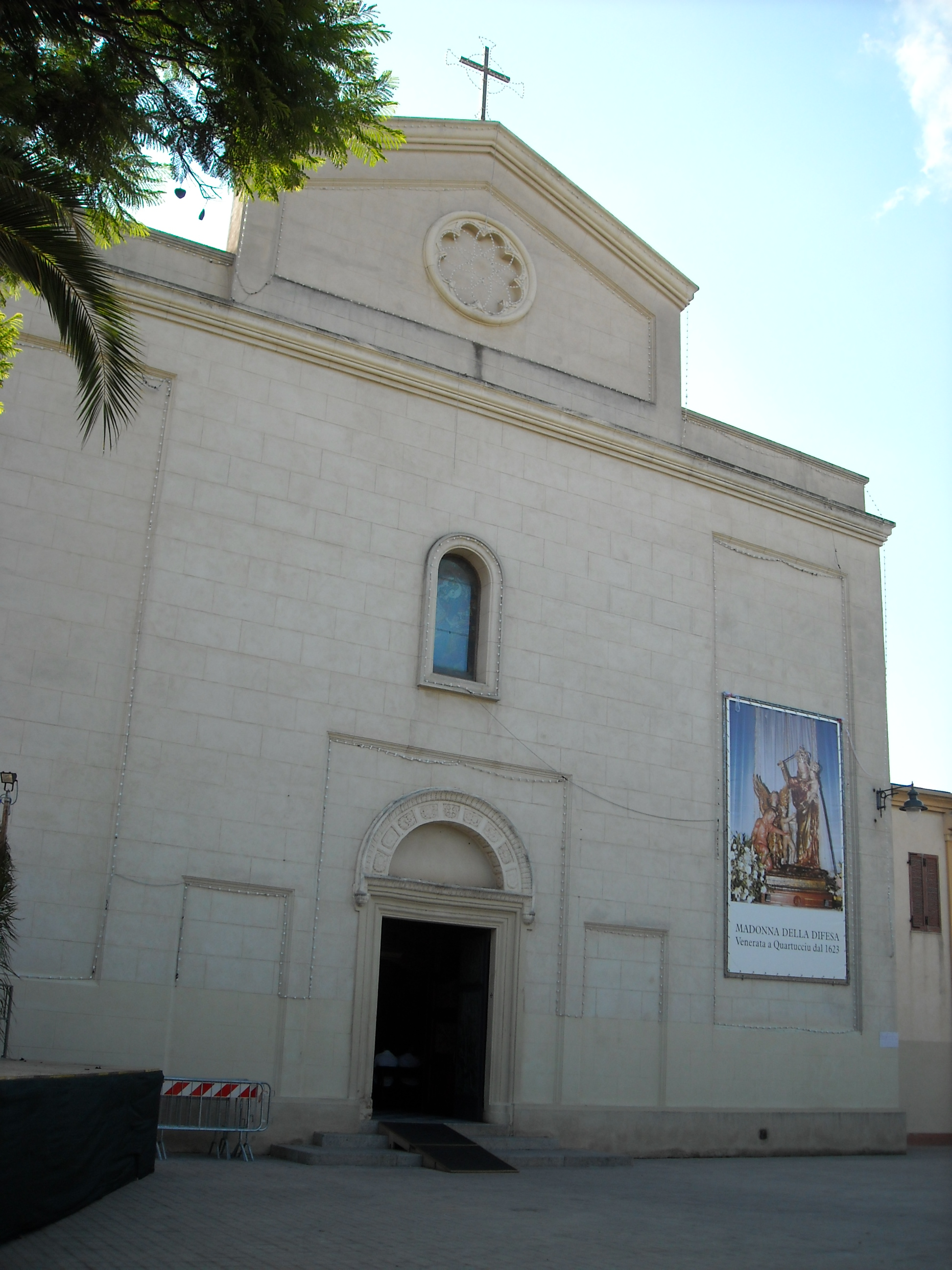
- Church of San Giorgio

- Coat of arms

- Location within Sardinia
- Coordinates: 39°15′10″N 9°10′40″E
- Country: Italy
- Region: Sardinia
- Metropolitan city: Cagliari (CA)
- Frazioni: Sant'Isidoro

Government
  - Mayor: Laura Pulga

Area
  - Total: 27.9 km^{2} (10.8 sq mi)
- Elevation: 14 m (46 ft)

Population (31 March 2015)
  - Total: 13,148
  - Density: 471/km^{2} (1,220/sq mi)
- Demonym: Quartucciai
- Time zone: UTC+1 (CET)
  - Summer (DST): UTC+2 (CEST)
- Postal code: 09044
- Dialing code: 070
- Patron saint: St. George
- Saint day: 23 April
- Website: Official website

Quartucciu (Sardinian: Cuartùcciu) is a comune (municipality) in the Metropolitan City of Cagliari in the Italian region Sardinia, located about 8 kilometres (5 mi) northeast of Cagliari.

== History ==
Human presences in the territory of Quartucciu is attested since prehistoric times. Some decades before the fall of the Western Roman Empire, Quartucciu, like the rest of the island, was conquered by the Vandals. In the Middle Ages it belonged to the giudicato of Cagliari, then to Pisa and, soon afterwards, to the Aragonese.

Until 1983, when it separated through a local referendum, Quartucciu was a district of Cagliari. The other three municipalities which separated from Cagliari in this decade were Elmas (1989) and Monserrato (1991).

== Main sights ==
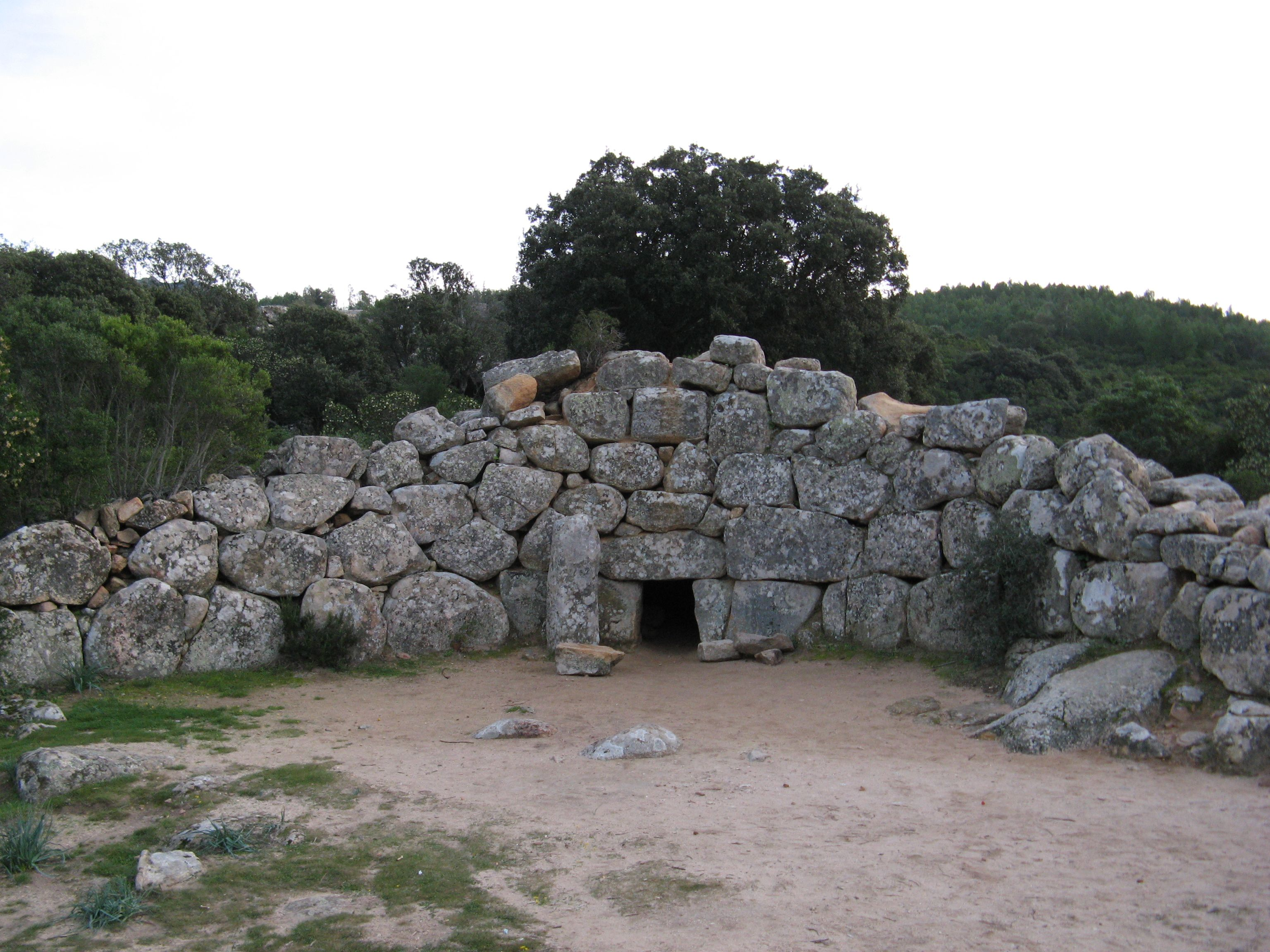
Giant's grave

Quartucciu's territory is home to one of the largest Giant's tomb in Sardinia, Sa Dom'è S'Orcu, dating to the 15th-12th century BC. Also present is a Phoenician-Roman necropolis, in the archaeological park of Pill'è Matta, including more than 200 tombs. It was frequented from the 4th century BC to the 5th century AD. Other sights include the Nuraghe Arrù (13th-9th century BC) and the church of St. George Martyr; the latter was built by the Aragonese, over a pre-existing Pisan structure, in the 14th century, and houses a 16th-century retablo.
