= List of municipalities of the Province of Medio Campidano =

This is a list of the 28 municipalities (comuni) of the Province of Medio Campidano of the autonomous region of Sardinia in Italy.

== List ==
| Municipality | Native name | Population (2026) | Area (km^{2}) | Density |
|---|---|---|---|---|
| Arbus | Àrbus | 5,532 | 269.12 | 20.6 |
| Barumini | Barùmini | 1,084 | 26.40 | 41.1 |
| Collinas | Fòrru | 741 | 20.83 | 35.6 |
| Furtei | Futèi | 1,474 | 26.11 | 56.5 |
| Genuri | Giaùni/Jaùni | 295 | 7.52 | 39.2 |
| Gesturi | Gèsturi | 1,113 | 46.83 | 23.8 |
| Gonnosfanadiga | Gònnos | 5,959 | 125.19 | 47.6 |
| Guspini | Gùspini | 10,563 | 174.67 | 60.5 |
| Las Plassas | Is Pràtzas | 208 | 11.04 | 18.8 |
| Lunamatrona | Lunamatròna | 1,582 | 20.59 | 76.8 |
| Pabillonis | Pabillòis | 2,404 | 37.42 | 64.2 |
| Pauli Arbarei | Paùli Arbarèi | 524 | 15.14 | 34.6 |
| Samassi | Samàssi | 4,674 | 42.04 | 111.2 |
| San Gavino Monreale | Santu 'Èngiu | 7,823 | 87.40 | 89.5 |
| Sanluri | Seddòri | 7,996 | 84.23 | 94.9 |
| Sardara | Sàrdara | 3,711 | 56.23 | 66.0 |
| Segariu | Segarìu | 1,074 | 16.69 | 64.3 |
| Serramanna | Serramànna | 8,388 | 83.84 | 100.0 |
| Serrenti | Serrènti | 4,425 | 42.78 | 103.4 |
| Setzu | Sètzu | 127 | 7.77 | 16.3 |
| Siddi | Sìddi | 541 | 11.02 | 49.1 |
| Tuili | Tuìli | 882 | 24.59 | 35.9 |
| Turri | Tùrri | 375 | 9.60 | 39.1 |
| Ussaramanna | Soramànna | 466 | 9.76 | 47.7 |
| Villacidro | Bidda de Cidru/Biddexìdru | 12,878 | 183.48 | 70.2 |
| Villamar | Mara Arbarèi | 2,392 | 38.53 | 62.1 |
| Villanovaforru | Biddanòa de Fòrru | 789 | 10.93 | 72.2 |
| Villanovafranca | Biddanòa Frànca | 1,135 | 27.59 | 41.1 |

== See also ==
- List of municipalities of Sardinia
- List of municipalities of Italy
