= List of archaeological and artistic sites of Sardinia =

This is a list of archaeological and artistic sites of Sardinia, Italy:

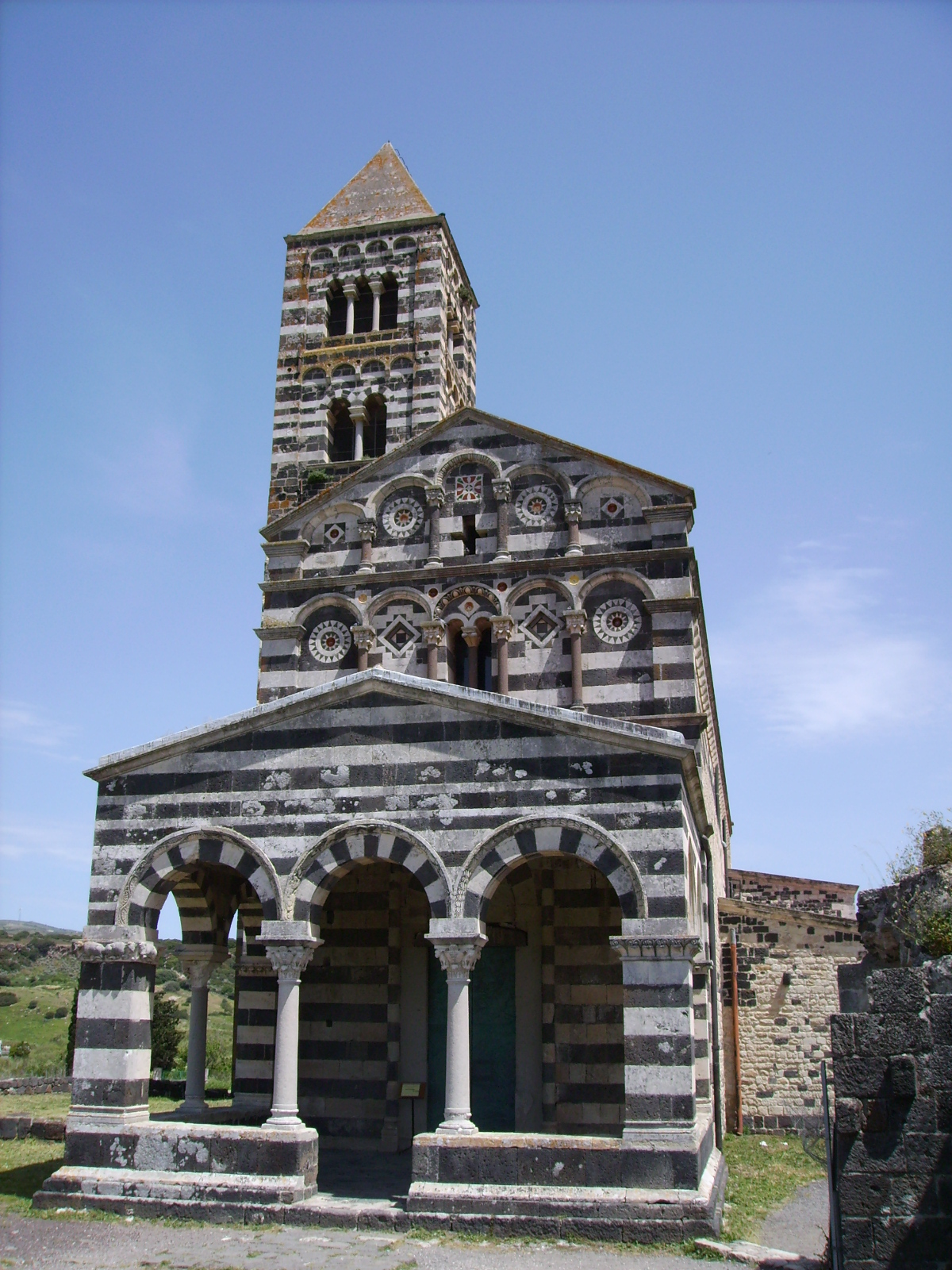
Basilica of Saccargia, Codrongianos

- Acquafredda near Siliqua, castle, 13th century
- Aiodda near Nurallao-Nuragus, Giants' Tomb
- Albucciu near Olbia-Arzachena, nuraghe
- Alghero
- Anghelu Ruju near Alghero Ozieri, necropolis
- Antas near Fluminimaggiore, temple
- Ardara, Romanesque church of Santa Maria del Regno
- Argentiera carbon mines, ghost villages, industrial architecture
- Asoru near Muravera, nuraghe
- Arrubiu
- Assemini Catalan Gothic church, 16th century, Byzantine oratorio, 10th century
- Barumini nuragic palace and village (*Su Nuraxi), Catalan church 15th century, Catalan Gothic villa
- Benetutti church, 15th century, paintings
- Biristeddi Giants Tomb
- Bisarcio Romanesque church
- Bonarcado church 11th century
- Bonorva nuragic temple, nuragic tombs, Carthaginian fort, medieval village, church 16th century
- Bonu Ighinu, cave
- Borore
- Bosa
- Brodu
- Bulzi
- Burghidu, nuraghe
- Cabu Abbas
- Cagliari
- Cala Domestica
- Campu Luntanu
- Carbonia
- Castelsardo
- Coddu Vecchiu, Giants Tomb
- Cornus
- Dolianova
- Domu de Orgia
- Domu s Orku
- Friarosu
- Fonte e Mola
- Funtana Cuverta
- Genna Maria
- Genna Salixi
- Genoni
- Gergei
- Gesturi
- Golgo
- Gonnostramatza
- Iglesias
- Is Concias
- Is Paras, nuraghe
- Izzana, nuraghe
- Kukkuru Nuraxi
- Laconi
- Li Muri
- Losa, nuraghe
- Lugherras, nuraghe
- Macomer
- Madau
- Mandra Antine
- Massama
- Milis
- Molafa
- Monte Arci
- Monte d'Accoddi
- Monte Sirai A fortified hilltop town founded in the 8th century BC
- Montessu
- Montevecchio
- Moseddu
- Nora
- Nugoro
- Nuxis
- Olbia, church of San Simplicio (Olbia)
- Oliena
- Olmedo
- Olzai
- Oristano
- Orolo, nuraghe
- Ossi
- Ottana
- Ozieri
- Palmavera
- Pani Loriga
- Perfugas
- Ploaghe
- Porto Torres
- Pranu Mutteddu
- Quirra
- Roccia dell Elefante
- Saccargia
- Sa Coveccada, dolmen
- San Cosimo
- San Giovanni di Sinis
- San Mauro
- San Platano
- San Salvatore
- Sant Antioco
- Santa Cristina di Paulilatino
- Santa Giusta, ex-Cathedral of Santa Giusta
- Santa Vittoria
- Santu Antine Nuraghe
- Sa Punta e su Nurake
- Sardara
- Sas Concas
- Sassari
- Sa Testa
- Seneghe
- Serra Orrios
- Seruci
- Sibiola
- Silanus
- Sorradile
- Sorres
- Sos Furrighesos
- Suelli
- Sulci, Phoenician city, Carthaginian necropolis, Roman ruins
- Su Mulinu
- Su Pranu
- Su Tempiesu
- Tamuli
- Tergu, church of Nostra Signora di Tergu
- Tharros
- Thiesi
- Thomes
- Tiscali
- Tratalias
- Trullas
- Tuili
- Tuvixeddu necropolis Carthaginian and later Roman necropolis
- Uta
- Villamar
- Zuri
