= Marmilla =

Coordinates: 39.7000°N 8.7833°E

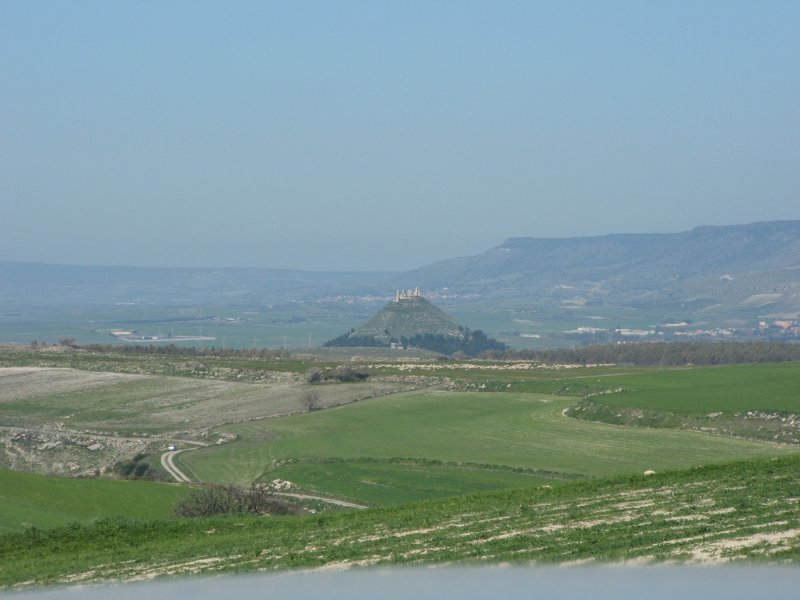
Castle of Las Plassas, or of Marmilla, which gave its name to the region.

Marmilla is a natural region of southern-central Sardinia, Italy.

== Etymology ==
The name Marmilla comes from the vast rounded hills, probably resembling udders (see Marmilla castle in Las Plassas). Another hypothesis is that according to which given the presence of many marshes in the area, the landscape could appear dotted with "a thousand seas".

== Geography ==
It is delimited from west and south by the Campidano, from north-west by Monte Arci, from north by the Giara di Gesturi and the Giara di Serri, and from east by the Flumini Mannu.

Geologically, most of Marmilla dates to the Miocene period, and is thus substantially younger than the rest of Sardinia. The landscape is mostly hilly, and human economical activities in the area include agriculture (prevalently cereals and fava beans) and tourism.

== History ==
Marmilla was inhabited since prehistoric times, as testified by the presence of nuraghe. To the Carthaginian domination date the fortress of Genoni. During the Middle Ages it was part of the Giudicato of Arborea and of the Giudicato of Cagliari.

== Tourism ==
Tourism in the Marmilla can rely on various factors ranging from environmental assets, to the numerous Nuragic centers in the area, to architectural works. In particular, we note:

=== Environmental assets ===
- Giara of Gesturi
- Monte Arci Natural Park
- Nuragic centers:
  - Nuragic village of Su Nuraxi in Barumini
  - Nuraghe Cuccurada in Mogoro
  - Archaeological Area Nuraghe Sa Fogaia in Siddi
  - Tomb of the Giants "Sa Domu e s'Orcu" in Siddi
  - Genna Maria complex in Villanovaforru
  - Su Mulinu Fortress in Villanovafranca
  - Nuragic sanctuary of Santa Vittoria in Serri

=== Architectural works ===
- Romanesque churches of San Michele Arcangelo in Siddi, San Pietro in Villamar and San Giovanni Battista in Barumini
- Gothic parish churches of San Vito in Gergei, Santa Barbara in Genoni and Beata Vergine Immacolata in Barumini
- Judicial castle of Las Plassas
- Sixteenth-century house Zapata di Barumini
- Portals of the historic houses of Simala
- Church with Romanesque features San Biagio (Santu Brai) in Furtei

=== Museums ===
- "Sa Corona Arrubuia" Museum in Lunamatrona
- Ornithological Museum in Siddi
- Obsidian Museum in Pau
- Monte Arci Geomuseum in Masullas
- Museum "The Knights of the Hills" in Masullas
- "Turcus and Morus" Museum in Gonnostramatza
- MudA Museum in Las Plassas
