= ISO 3166-2:IT =

Entry for Italy in ISO 3166-2

ISO 3166-2:IT is the entry for Italy in ISO 3166-2, part of the ISO 3166 standard published by the International Organization for Standardization (ISO), which defines codes for the names of the principal subdivisions (e.g., provinces or states) of all countries coded in ISO 3166-1.

== Elements ==
Currently for Italy, ISO 3166-2 codes are defined for two levels of subdivisions:

- 15 regions and five autonomous regions
- 80 provinces, two autonomous provinces, four decentralized regional entities, six free municipal consortia and 14 metropolitan cities

Each code consists of two parts, separated by a hyphen. The first part is IT, the ISO 3166-1 alpha-2 code of Italy. The second part is either of the following:

- two digits: regions
- two letters: provinces, decentralized regional entities, free municipal consortia and metropolitan cities

For the regions, the first digit indicates the geographical region where the subdivision is in:

- 2, 3, 4: Northern Italy
- 5: Central Italy (excluding Lazio)
- 6, 7: Southern Italy (including Lazio)
- 8: Insular Italy

For provinces, the two-letter part is an abbreviation of the province name, such as 'PG' for Perugia, although, as an exception, the code for former Medio Campidano (IT-VS) whose name was based on its two capitals, Villacidro and Sanluri.

== Vehicle registration plates ==
The two-letter provincial codes were used in vehicle registration plates between 1905 and 1994 (except for Rome, whose vehicle code has always been ROMA instead of RM).

In 1994, a new universal notation was introduced, dropping the province code entirely. This proved to be unpopular, and the two-letter code (or "ROMA") has been allowed to be added to a new, EU-style, blue border of the plates since 1999.

== Current codes ==
Subdivision names are listed as in the ISO 3166-2 standard published by the ISO 3166 Maintenance Agency (ISO 3166/MA).

ISO 639-1 codes are used to represent subdivision names in the following administrative languages:

- (de): German
- (fr): French

Click on the button in the header to sort each column.

=== First Level Subdivisions ===
Code	Subdivision name (it) (Note: Names are in Italian (it) except where noted.)	Subdivision name (en) (Note: For reference only, English name not included in the ISO 3166-2 standard.)	Subdivision category
IT-65	Abruzzo	Abruzzo	region
IT-77	Basilicata	Basilicata	region
IT-78	Calabria	Calabria	region
IT-72	Campania	Campania	region
IT-45	Emilia-Romagna	Emilia-Romagna	region
IT-36	Friuli Venezia Giulia	Friuli Venezia Giulia	autonomous region
IT-62	Lazio	Lazio	region
IT-42	Liguria	Liguria	region
IT-25	Lombardia	Lombardy	region
IT-57	Marche	Marche	region
IT-67	Molise	Molise	region
IT-21	Piemonte	Piedmont	region
IT-75	Puglia	Apulia	region
IT-88	Sardegna	Sardinia	autonomous region
IT-82	Sicilia	Sicily	autonomous region
IT-52	Toscana	Tuscany	region
IT-32	Trentino-Alto Adige, Trentino-Südtirol (de)	Trentino-South Tyrol	autonomous region
IT-55	Umbria	Umbria	region
IT-23	Valle d'Aosta, Vallée d'Aoste (fr)	Aosta Valley	autonomous region
IT-34	Veneto	Veneto	region

=== Second Level Subdivisions ===
Code	Subdivision name (it)	Subdivision category	In region
IT-AG	Agrigento	free municipal consortium	82
IT-AL	Alessandria	province	21
IT-AN	Ancona	province	57
IT-AR	Arezzo	province	52
IT-AP	Ascoli Piceno	province	57
IT-AT	Asti	province	21
IT-AV	Avellino	province	72
IT-BA	Bari	metropolitan city	75
IT-BT	Barletta-Andria-Trani	province	75
IT-BL	Belluno	province	34
IT-BN	Benevento	province	72
IT-BG	Bergamo	province	25
IT-BI	Biella	province	21
IT-BO	Bologna	metropolitan city	45
IT-BZ	Bolzano, Bozen (de)	autonomous province	32
IT-BS	Brescia	province	25
IT-BR	Brindisi	province	75
IT-CA	Cagliari	metropolitan city	88
IT-CL	Caltanissetta	free municipal consortium	82
IT-CB	Campobasso	province	67
IT-CE	Caserta	province	72
IT-CT	Catania	metropolitan city	82
IT-CZ	Catanzaro	province	78
IT-CH	Chieti	province	65
IT-CO	Como	province	25
IT-CS	Cosenza	province	78
IT-CR	Cremona	province	25
IT-KR	Crotone	province	78
IT-CN	Cuneo	province	21
IT-EN	Enna	free municipal consortium	82
IT-FM	Fermo	province	57
IT-FE	Ferrara	province	45
IT-FI	Firenze	metropolitan city	52
IT-FG	Foggia	province	75
IT-FC	Forlì-Cesena	province	45
IT-FR	Frosinone	province	62
IT-GE	Genova	metropolitan city	42
IT-GO	Gorizia	decentralized regional entity	36
IT-GR	Grosseto	province	52
IT-IM	Imperia	province	42
IT-IS	Isernia	province	67
IT-AQ	L'Aquila	province	65
IT-SP	La Spezia	province	42
IT-LT	Latina	province	62
IT-LE	Lecce	province	75
IT-LC	Lecco	province	25
IT-LI	Livorno	province	52
IT-LO	Lodi	province	25
IT-LU	Lucca	province	52
IT-MC	Macerata	province	57
IT-MN	Mantova	province	25
IT-MS	Massa-Carrara	province	52
IT-MT	Matera	province	77
IT-ME	Messina	metropolitan city	82
IT-MI	Milano	metropolitan city	25
IT-MO	Modena	province	45
IT-MB	Monza e Brianza	province	25
IT-NA	Napoli	metropolitan city	72
IT-NO	Novara	province	21
IT-NU	Nuoro	province	88
IT-OR	Oristano	province	88
IT-PD	Padova	province	34
IT-PA	Palermo	metropolitan city	82
IT-PR	Parma	province	45
IT-PV	Pavia	province	25
IT-PG	Perugia	province	55
IT-PU	Pesaro e Urbino	province	57
IT-PE	Pescara	province	65
IT-PC	Piacenza	province	45
IT-PI	Pisa	province	52
IT-PT	Pistoia	province	52
IT-PN	Pordenone	decentralized regional entity	36
IT-PZ	Potenza	province	77
IT-PO	Prato	province	52
IT-RG	Ragusa	free municipal consortium	82
IT-RA	Ravenna	province	45
IT-RC	Reggio Calabria	metropolitan city	78
IT-RE	Reggio Emilia	province	45
IT-RI	Rieti	province	62
IT-RN	Rimini	province	45
IT-RM	Roma	metropolitan city	62
IT-RO	Rovigo	province	34
IT-SA	Salerno	province	72
IT-SS	Sassari	province	88
IT-SV	Savona	province	42
IT-SI	Siena	province	52
IT-SR	Siracusa	free municipal consortium	82
IT-SO	Sondrio	province	25
IT-SU	Sud Sardegna	province	88
IT-TA	Taranto	province	75
IT-TE	Teramo	province	65
IT-TR	Terni	province	55
IT-TO	Torino	metropolitan city	21
IT-TP	Trapani	free municipal consortium	82
IT-TN	Trento	autonomous province	32
IT-TV	Treviso	province	34
IT-TS	Trieste	decentralized regional entity	36
IT-UD	Udine	decentralized regional entity	36
IT-VA	Varese	province	25
IT-VE	Venezia	metropolitan city	34
IT-VB	Verbano-Cusio-Ossola	province	21
IT-VC	Vercelli	province	21
IT-VR	Verona	province	34
IT-VV	Vibo Valentia	province	78
IT-VI	Vicenza	province	34
IT-VT	Viterbo	province	62

== Changes ==
The following changes to the entry have been announced in newsletters by the ISO 3166/MA since the first publication of ISO 3166-2 in 1998:

Newsletter	Date issued	Description of change in newsletter	Code/Subdivision change
Newsletter I-1	2000-06-21	Correction of spelling mistakes of names of 2 provinces	
Newsletter I-8	2007-04-17	Modification of the administrative structure	Subdivisions added: IT-CI Carbonia-Iglesias; IT-VS Medio Campidano; IT-OG Ogliastra; IT-OT Olbia-Tempio
Newsletter II-1	2010-02-03 (corrected 2010-02-19)	Addition of the country code prefix as the first code element, administrative update	Subdivisions added: IT-BT Barletta-Andria-Trani; IT-FM Fermo; IT-MB Monza e Brianza; Codes: IT-FO Forlì → IT-FC Forlì-Cesena
Newsletter II-2	2010-06-30	Corrections from Newsletters I-1 and I-8	Codes: (to correct inconsistencies between newsletters); Medio Campidano: IT-MA → IT-VS; Olbia-Tempio IT-OL → IT-OT; Pesaro e Urbino IT-PS → IT-PU
Online Browsing; Platform (OBP)	2019-04-09	Addition of province IT-SD; Addition of category names free communal consortia and metropolitan cities in eng, fra and ita; Change of category name from province to free communal consortia for IT-AG, IT-CL, IT-EN, IT-RG, IT-SR, IT-TP; Change of category name from province to metropolitan city for IT-BA, IT-BO, IT-CA, IT-CT, IT-FI, IT-GE, IT-ME, IT-MI, IT-NA, IT-PA, IT-RC, IT-RM, IT-TO, IT-VE; Deletion of provinces IT-CI, IT-GO, IT-OG, IT-OT, IT-PN, IT-TS, IT-UD, IT-VS; Update List Source	Subdivisions deleted: 8 provinces (see below); Subdivisions added: IT-SD Sud Sardegna; Category changes: IT-AG, IT-CL, IT-EN, IT-RG, IT-SR, IT-TP: province → free communal consortia IT-BA, IT-BO, IT-CA, IT-CT, IT-FI, IT-GE, IT-ME, IT-MI, IT-NA, IT-PA, IT-RC, IT-RM, IT-TO, IT-VE: province → metropolitan city
Online Browsing; Platform (OBP)	2019-11-22	Change of spelling of IT-36; Deletion of province IT-AO; Change of spelling of category name in eng from free communal consortia to free municipal consortium; Change of spelling of category name in ita from libero consorzion communale [sic] to libero consorzio comunale; Change of spelling of category name in ita from città metropolitan to città metropolitana; Addition of category name autonomous region and autonomous province; Change of category name from region to autonomous region for IT-23, IT-32, IT-36, IT-82, IT-88; Change of category name from province to autonomous province for IT-BZ, IT-TN; Update List Source	Name changes: IT-36 Friuli-Venezia Giulia → Friuli Venezia Giulia free communal consortia → free municipal consortium Subdivisions deleted: IT-AO Aosta; Category changes: IT-23, IT-32, IT-36, IT-82, IT-88: region → autonomous region IT-BZ, IT-TN: province → autonomous province
Online Browsing; Platform (OBP)	2020-11-24	Correction of subdivision code from IT-SD to IT-SU; Addition of category decentralized regional entity; addition of decentralized regional entity IT-GO, IT-PN, IT-TS, IT-UD; Update List Source	Code changes: IT-SD → IT-SU Sud Sardegna; Subdivisions added: IT-GO Gorizia; IT-PN Pordenone; IT-TS Trieste; IT-UD Udine

=== Codes deleted on 9 April 2019 ===
Code	Subdivision name	In region	Absorbed by
IT-CI	Carbonia-Iglesias	88	SU
IT-GO	Gorizia	36	36 (Note: These provinces have been broken into inter-communal territorial unions, which are collectively represented in ISO 3166-2:IT as the region of Friuli Venezia Giulia.)
IT-VS	Medio Campidano	88	SU
IT-OG	Ogliastra	88	NU, SU
IT-OT	Olbia-Tempio	88	SS
IT-PN	Pordenone	36	36
IT-TS	Trieste	36	36
IT-UD	Udine	36	36

=== Code deleted on 22 November 2019 ===
Code	Subdivision name	In region
IT-AO	Aosta, Aoste (fr)	23

== See also ==
- Subdivisions of Italy
- FIPS region codes of Italy
- NUTS codes of Italy
- Neighbouring countries: AT, CH, FR, SI, SM, VA
