= Nuragus =

- Comune
- Comune di Nuragus
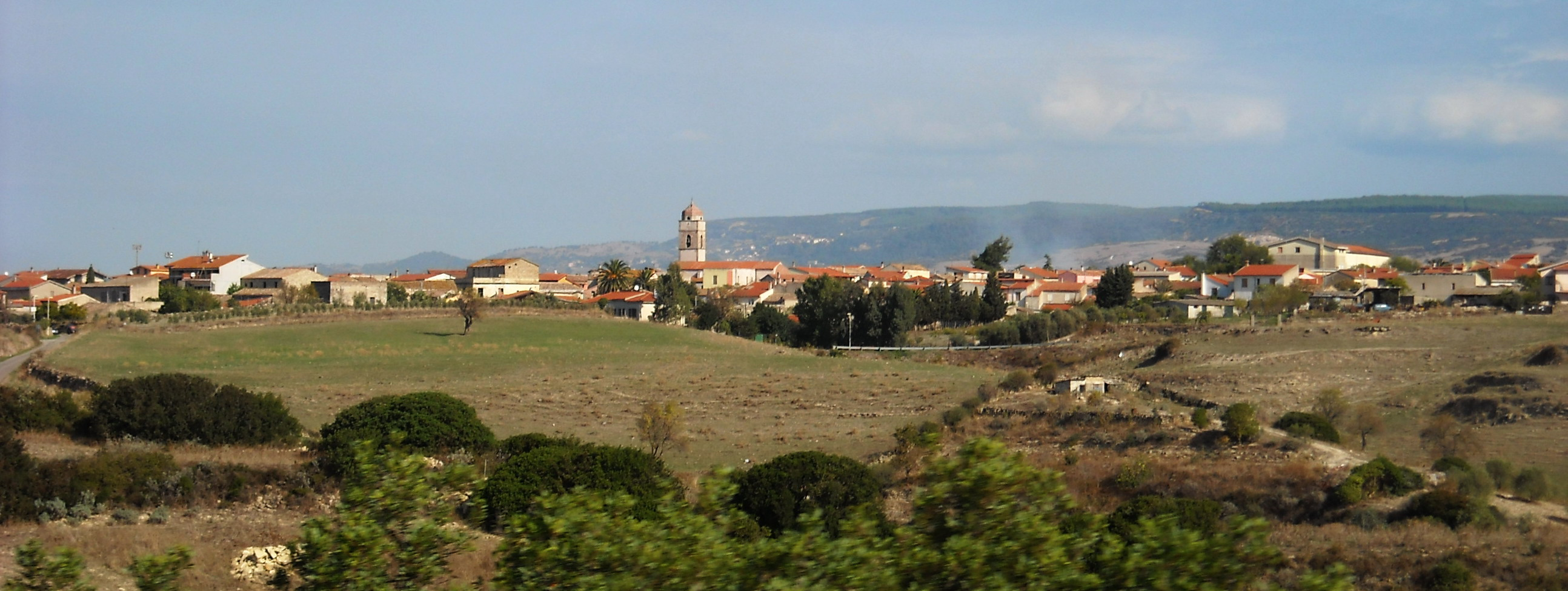
- Panorama of Nuragus

- Location within Sardinia
- Coordinates: 39°47′N 9°2′E
- Country: Italy
- Region: Sardinia
- Metropolitan city: Cagliari (CA)
- Frazioni: Lixius

Government
  - Mayor: Giovanni Daga

Area
  - Total: 19.9 km^{2} (7.7 sq mi)
- Elevation: 359 m (1,178 ft)

Population (31 December 2010)
  - Total: 968
  - Density: 48.6/km^{2} (126/sq mi)
- Demonym: Nuraghesi
- Time zone: UTC+1 (CET)
  - Summer (DST): UTC+2 (CEST)
- Postal code: 08030
- Dialing code: 0782
- Website: Official website

Nuragus (Latin: Valentia) is a small town, in administrative terms a comune (municipality), in the Metropolitan City of Cagliari in the Italian autonomous region of Sardinia, located about 60 kilometres (37 mi) north of the local capital Cagliari.

Nuragus borders the following municipalities: Genoni, Gesturi, Isili, Laconi, Nurallao.

== Archaeology ==
Copper trade originating in the eastern Mediterranean in the Bronze Age kingdom of Alashiya (probably Cyprus) reached as far west as Sardinia, where five typical oxhide ingots were first turned up by a plough in 1857, at the foot of a demolished nuraghe called Serra Ilixi by locals. The find was published by Luigi Pigorini in 1904.

Ingots from Serra Ilixi are on display at the National Archaeological Museum in Cagliari.

Between Nuragus and Nurallao there is the Giants' tomb of Aiodda, also from the Nuragic era.
