= Siddi, Sardinia =

Siddi
- Comune
- Comune di Siddi
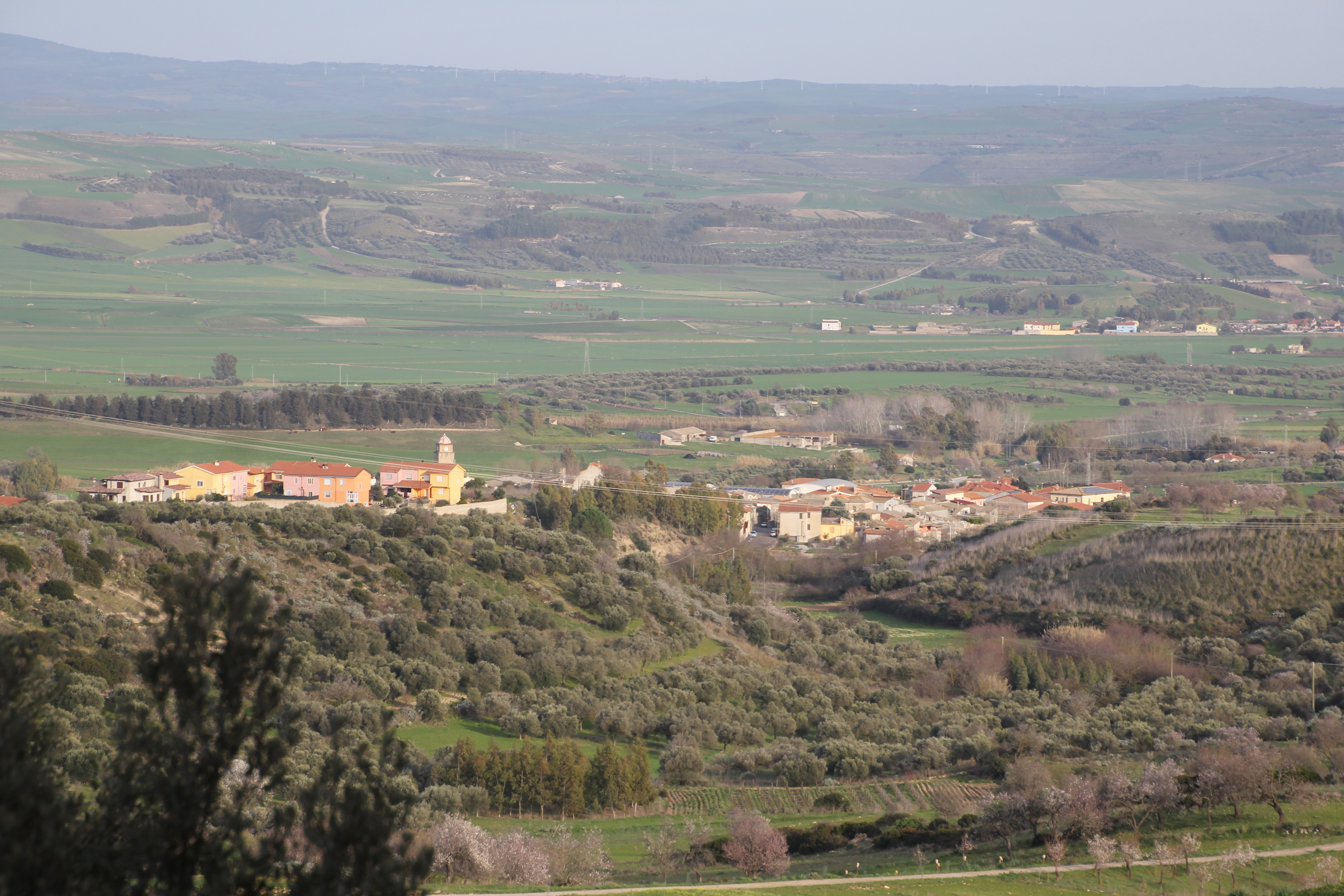
- View of Siddi

- Coat of arms

- Location within Sardinia
- Coordinates: 39°40′N 8°53′E
- Country: Italy
- Region: Sardinia
- Province: Medio Campidano

Government
  - Mayor: Stefano Puddu

Area
  - Total: 11.02 km^{2} (4.25 sq mi)
- Elevation: 187 m (614 ft)

Population (2026)
  - Total: 541
  - Density: 49.1/km^{2} (127/sq mi)
- Demonym: Siddesi
- Time zone: UTC+1 (CET)
  - Summer (DST): UTC+2 (CEST)
- Postal code: 09020
- Dialing code: 070

Siddi is a village and comune (municipality) in the Province of Medio Campidano in the autonomous island region of Sardinia in Italy, located about 50 kilometres (31 mi) northwest of Cagliari and about 11 kilometres (7 mi) north of Sanluri in the historical sub-region of Marmilla. It has 541 inhabitants.

Siddi is home to several archaeological findings, including a domus de janas from the Ozieri culture, a Giants' tomb and several nuraghe villages.

Siddi borders the municipalities of Baressa, Collinas, Gonnoscodina, Gonnostramatza, Lunamatrona, Pauli Arbarei, and Ussaramanna.

== Demographics ==
As of 2026, the population is 541, of which 49.9% are male, and 50.1% are female. Minors make up 5.5% of the population, and seniors make up 41.2%.

Historical population

Year	Pop.	±%
1861	608	—
1871	615	+1.2%
1881	603	−2.0%
1901	636	+5.5%
1911	631	−0.8%
1921	802	+27.1%
1931	869	+8.4%
1936	871	+0.2%

Year	Pop.	±%
1951	987	+13.3%
1961	1,121	+13.6%
1971	990	−11.7%
1981	903	−8.8%
1991	878	−2.8%
2001	799	−9.0%
2011	696	−12.9%
2021	595	−14.5%

Source: ISTAT

=== Immigration ===
As of 2025, immigrants make up 1.6% of the population. The 5 largest foreign countries of birth are France, Croatia, Cuba, Germany, and Romania.

== Gallery ==
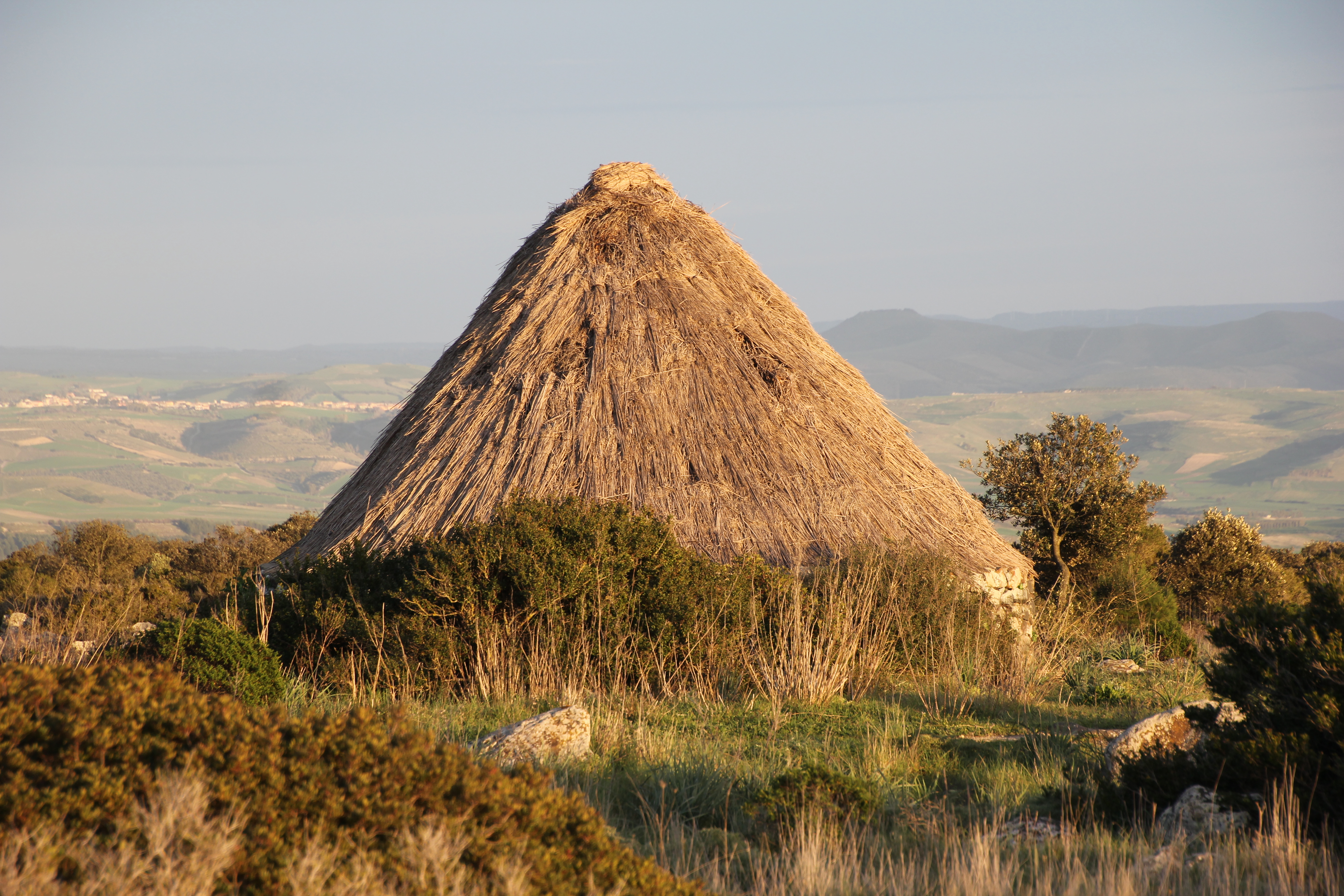
Pinnetta

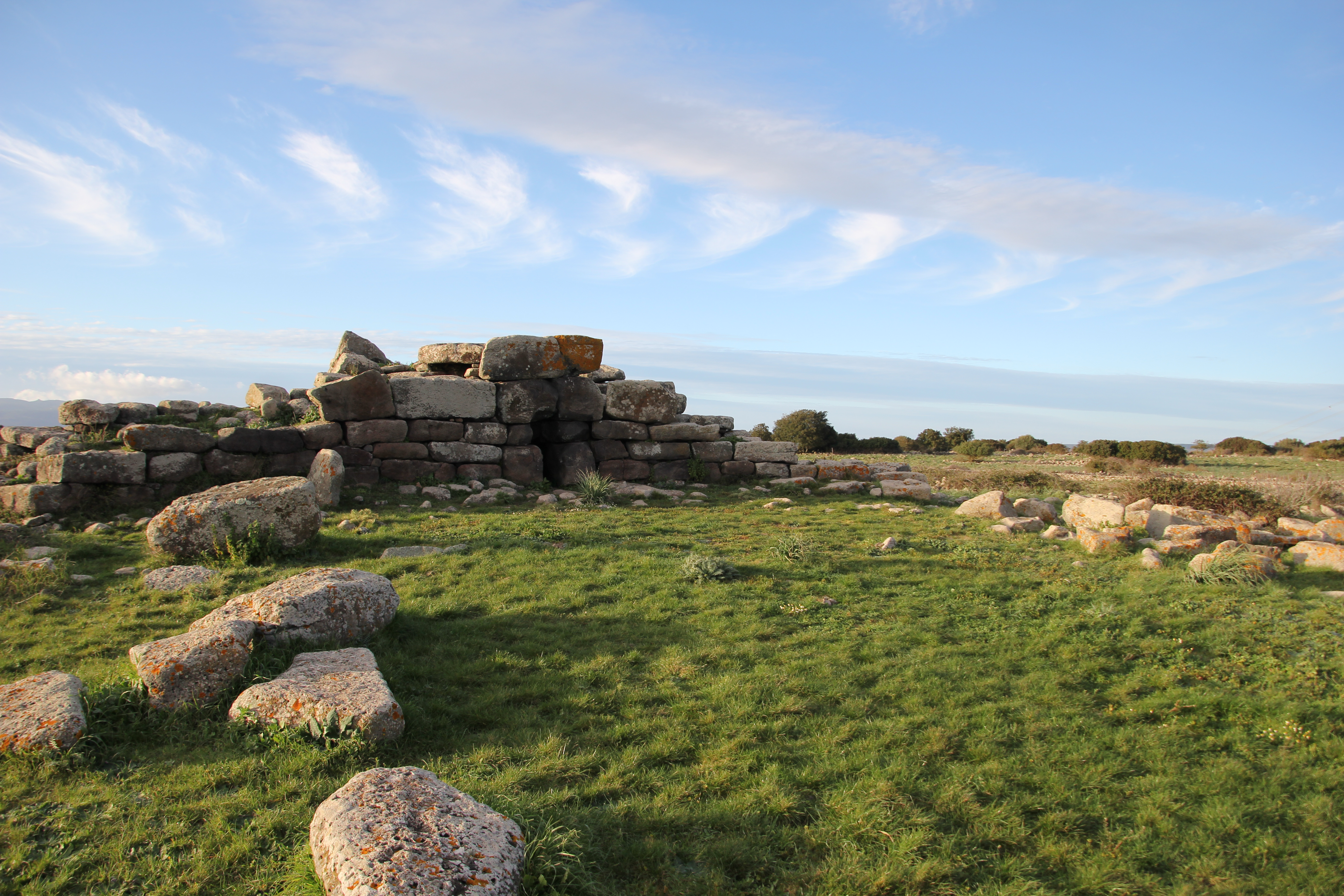
Sa Domu 'e s'Orcu tomb

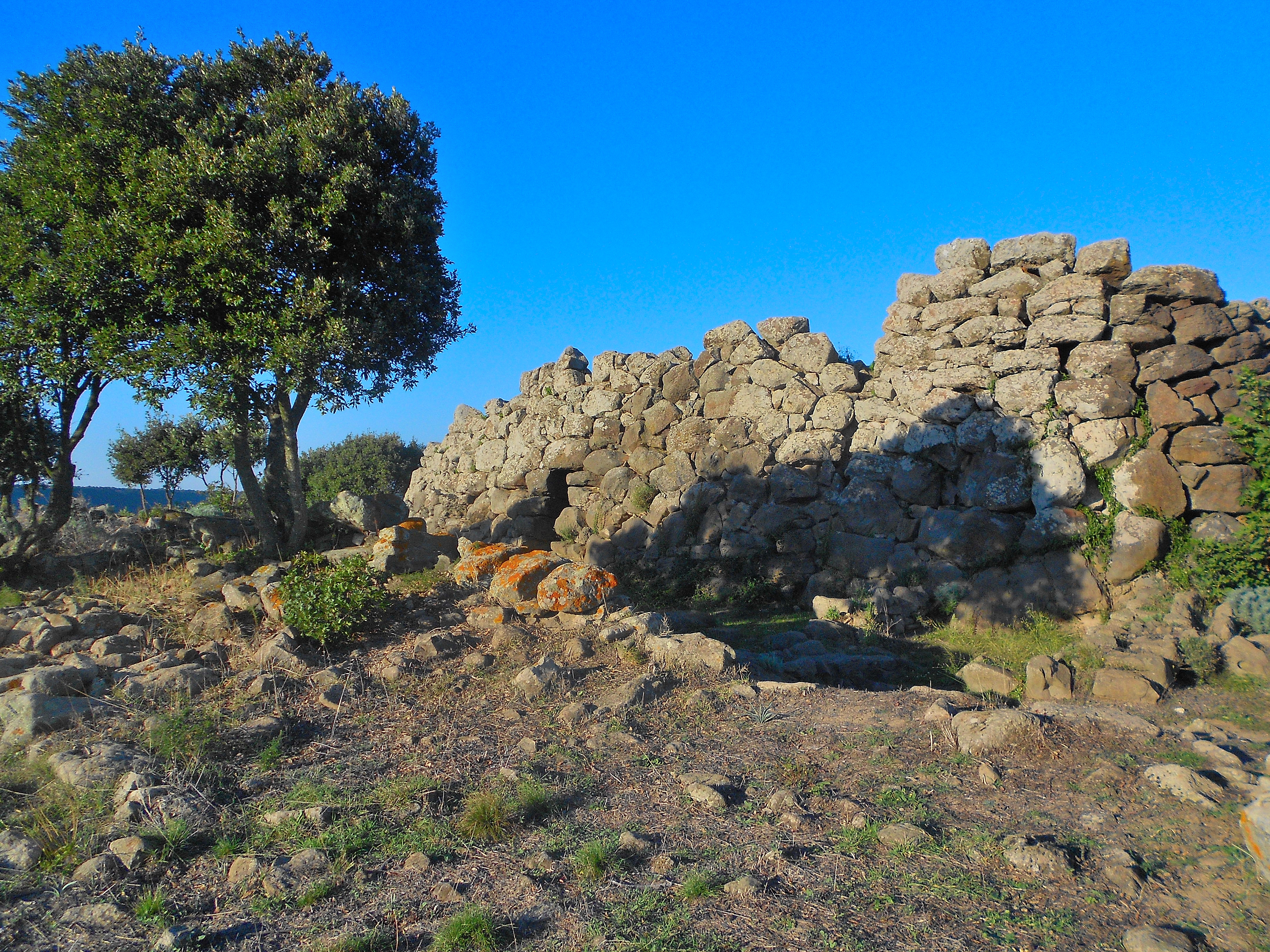
Sa Fogaia Nuraghe
