= Segariu =

- Comune
- Comune di Segariu
- Location within Sardinia
- Coordinates: 39°34′N 8°59′E
- Country: Italy
- Region: Sardinia
- Province: Medio Campidano

Area
  - Total: 16.69 km^{2} (6.44 sq mi)

Population (2026)
  - Total: 1,074
  - Density: 64.35/km^{2} (166.7/sq mi)
- Time zone: UTC+1 (CET)
  - Summer (DST): UTC+2 (CEST)
- Postal code: 09040
- Dialing code: 070

Segariu is a town and comune (municipality) in the Province of Medio Campidano in the autonomous island region of Sardinia in Italy, located about 40 kilometres (25 mi) northwest of Cagliari and about 7 kilometres (4 mi) east of Sanluri. It has 1,074 inhabitants.

Segariu borders the municipalities of Furtei, Guasila, and Villamar.

== Demographics ==
As of 2026, the population is 1,074, of which 49.9% are male, and 50.1% are female. Minors make up 10.7% of the population, and seniors make up 29.5%.

Historical population

Year	Pop.	±%
1861	700	—
1871	588	−16.0%
1881	647	+10.0%
1901	661	+2.2%
1911	732	+10.7%
1921	750	+2.5%
1931	899	+19.9%
1936	989	+10.0%

Year	Pop.	±%
1951	1,308	+32.3%
1961	1,441	+10.2%
1971	1,409	−2.2%
1981	1,432	+1.6%
1991	1,383	−3.4%
2001	1,358	−1.8%
2011	1,277	−6.0%
2021	1,112	−12.9%

Source: ISTAT

=== Immigration ===
As of 2025, immigrants make up 3.0% of the population. The 5 largest foreign countries of birth are Morocco, France, Germany, Switzerland, and the United Kingdom.
