= ISO 3166-2:VA =

Entry for Vatican City in ISO 3166-2

ISO 3166-2:VA is the entry for Vatican City in ISO 3166-2, part of the ISO 3166 standard published by the International Organization for Standardization (ISO), which defines codes for the names of the principal subdivisions (e.g., provinces or states) of all countries coded in ISO 3166-1.

Vatican City is officially assigned the ISO 3166-1 alpha-2 code VA under the name "the Holy See".

Currently no ISO 3166-2 codes are defined in the entry for the Holy See. The country has no defined subdivisions.

== Changes ==
The following changes to the entry have been announced in newsletters by the ISO 3166/MA since the first publication of ISO 3166-2 in 1998. ISO stopped issuing newsletters in 2013.

Newsletter	Date issued	Description of change in newsletter
Newsletter IV-1	1996-04-03	Short and full names of Vatican City changed from Vatican City State (Holy See) to Holy See (Vatican City State).

The following changes to the entry are listed on ISO's online catalogue, the Online Browsing Platform:

Effective date of change	Short description of change (en)
2014-12-18	Alignment of the English and French short names upper and lower case with UNTERM
2018-11-26	Modification of remark part 2

== See also ==
- Neighbouring country: IT
