= Pauli Arbarei =

- Comune
- Comune di Pauli Arbarei
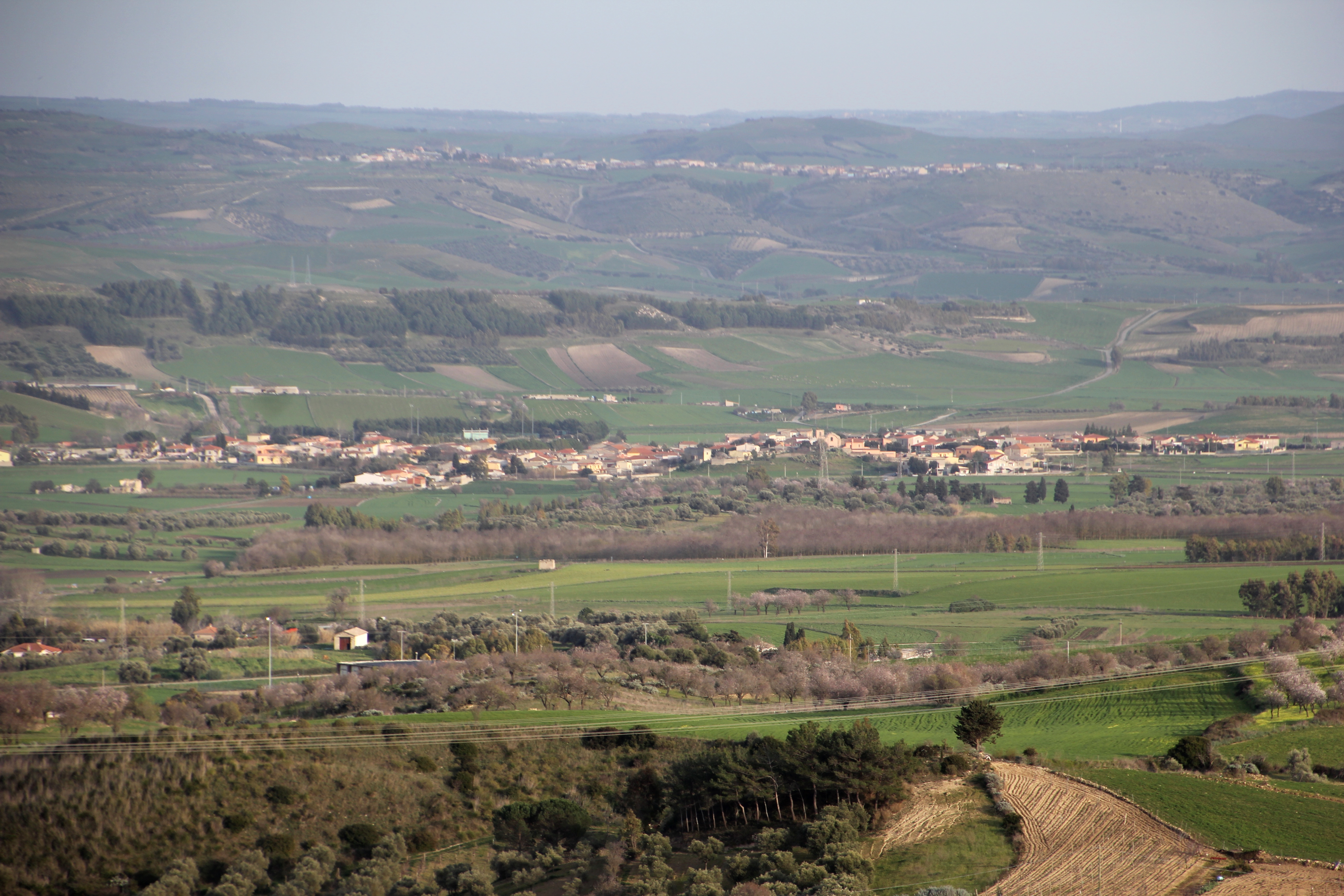
- View of Pauli Arbarei

- Coat of arms

- Location within Sardinia
- Coordinates: 39°40′N 8°55′E
- Country: Italy
- Region: Sardinia
- Province: Medio Campidano

Government
  - Mayor: Emanuela Cadeddu

Area
  - Total: 15.14 km^{2} (5.85 sq mi)
- Elevation: 136 m (446 ft)

Population (2026)
  - Total: 524
  - Density: 34.6/km^{2} (89.6/sq mi)
- Demonym: Paulesi
- Time zone: UTC+1 (CET)
  - Summer (DST): UTC+2 (CEST)
- Postal code: 09020
- Dialing code: 070
- Patron saint: St. Vincent
- Saint day: 22 January
- Website: Official website

Pauli Arbarei is a village and comune (municipality) in the Province of Medio Campidano in the autonomous island region of Sardinia in Italy, located about 50 kilometres (31 mi) northwest of Cagliari and about 11 kilometres (7 mi) north of Sanluri. It has 524 inhabitants.

The economy is mostly based on agriculture and animal husbandry.

Pauli Arbarei borders the municipalities of Las Plassas, Lunamatrona, Siddi, Tuili, Turri, Ussaramanna, and Villamar.

== Demographics ==
As of 2026, the population is 524, of which 51.3% are male, and 48.7% are female. Minors make up 9.0% of the population, and seniors make up 28.4%.

Historical population

Year	Pop.	±%
1861	433	—
1871	424	−2.1%
1881	409	−3.5%
1901	401	−2.0%
1911	477	+19.0%
1921	530	+11.1%
1931	656	+23.8%
1936	676	+3.0%

Year	Pop.	±%
1951	801	+18.5%
1961	797	−0.5%
1971	787	−1.3%
1981	778	−1.1%
1991	719	−7.6%
2001	720	+0.1%
2011	651	−9.6%
2021	564	−13.4%

Source: ISTAT

=== Immigration ===
As of 2025, immigrants make up 4.3% of the population. The 5 largest foreign countries of birth are Germany, Ukraine, Moldova, Morocco, and Belgium.
