= Gonnosnò =

- Comune
- Comune di Gonnosnò
- Coat of arms

- Location within Sardinia
- Coordinates: 39°46′N 8°52′E
- Country: Italy
- Region: Sardinia
- Province: Oristano (OR)
- Frazioni: Figu

Government
  - Mayor: Mauro Steri

Area
  - Total: 15.46 km^{2} (5.97 sq mi)
- Elevation: 195 m (640 ft)

Population (31 August 2017)
  - Total: 768
  - Density: 49.7/km^{2} (129/sq mi)
- Demonym: Gonnosnesi
- Time zone: UTC+1 (CET)
  - Summer (DST): UTC+2 (CEST)
- Postal code: 09090
- Dialing code: 0783
- Website: Official website

Gonnosnò is a comune (municipality) in the Province of Oristano in the Italian region Sardinia, located about 60 kilometres (37 mi) northwest of Cagliari and about 30 kilometres (19 mi) southeast of Oristano.

Gonnosnò borders the following municipalities: Albagiara, Ales, Baradili, Baressa, Curcuris, Genoni, Simala, Sini, Usellus.
