= Turri, Sardinia =

Turri
- Comune
- Comune di Turri
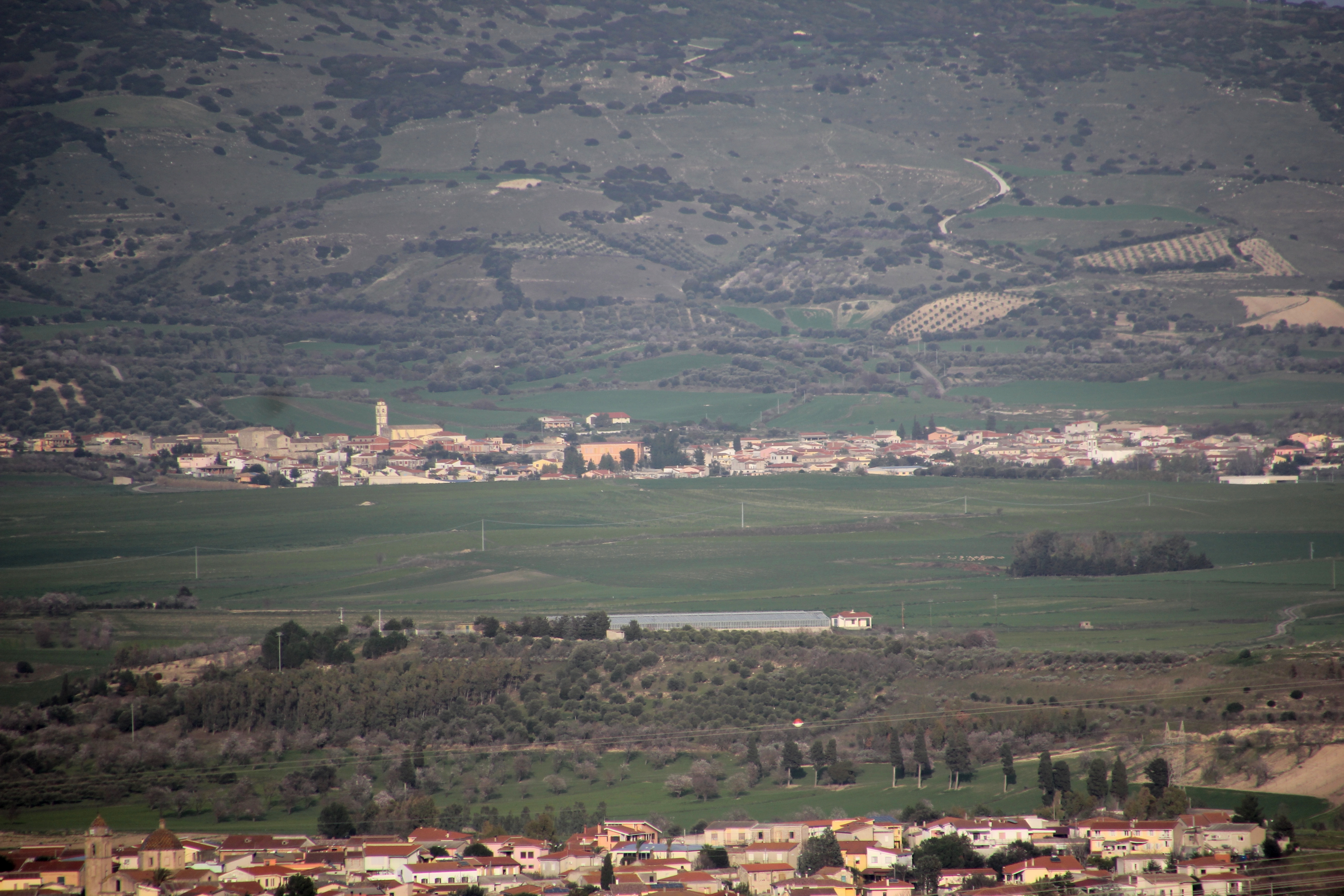
- View of Turri

- Location within Sardinia
- Coordinates: 39°42′N 8°55′E
- Country: Italy
- Region: Sardinia
- Province: Medio Campidano

Area
  - Total: 9.60 km^{2} (3.71 sq mi)
- Elevation: 164 m (538 ft)

Population (2026)
  - Total: 375
  - Density: 39.1/km^{2} (101/sq mi)
- Demonym: Turresi
- Time zone: UTC+1 (CET)
  - Summer (DST): UTC+2 (CEST)
- Postal code: 09020
- Dialing code: 0783

Turri is a village and comune (municipality) in the Province of Medio Campidano in the autonomous island region of Sardinia in Italy, located about 60 kilometres (37 mi) northwest of Cagliari and about 15 kilometres (9 mi) north of Sanluri. It has 375 inhabitants.

Turri borders the municipalities of Baradili, Baressa, Genuri, Pauli Arbarei, Setzu, Tuili, and Ussaramanna.

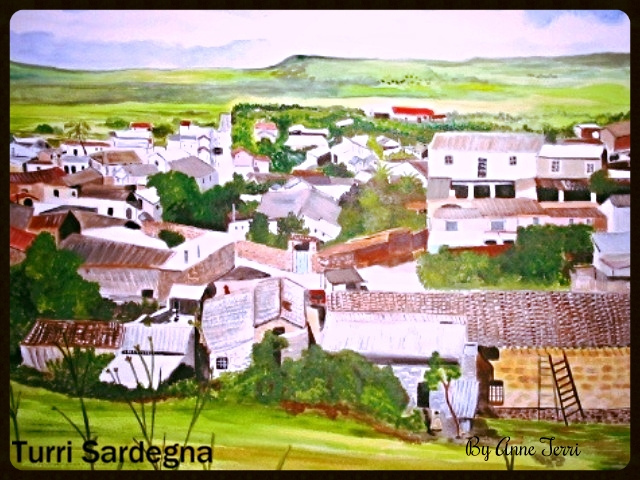
Painting in acrylics and watercolor from an old photo

== Demographics ==
As of 2026, the population is 375, of which 50.7% are male, and 49.3% are female. Minors make up 10.1% of the population, and seniors make up 40.3%.

Historical population

| Year | Pop. | ±% |
|---|---|---|
| 1861 | 454 | — |
| 1871 | 488 | +7.5% |
| 1881 | 511 | +4.7% |
| 1901 | 503 | −1.6% |
| 1911 | 490 | −2.6% |
| 1921 | 487 | −0.6% |
| 1931 | 575 | +18.1% |
| 1936 | 602 | +4.7% |

| Year | Pop. | ±% |
|---|---|---|
| 1951 | 729 | +21.1% |
| 1961 | 734 | +0.7% |
| 1971 | 633 | −13.8% |
| 1981 | 597 | −5.7% |
| 1991 | 572 | −4.2% |
| 2001 | 533 | −6.8% |
| 2011 | 442 | −17.1% |
| 2021 | 391 | −11.5% |

Source: ISTAT

=== Immigration ===
As of 2025, immigrants make up 6.5% of the population. The 5 largest foreign countries of birth are Morocco, Germany, Romania, Belgium, and France.
