= Baradili =

Baradili Bobadri
- Comune
- Comune di Baradili
- Coat of arms

- Location within Sardinia
- Coordinates: 39°43′N 8°54′E
- Country: Italy
- Region: Sardinia
- Province: Oristano

Government
  - Mayor: Lino Zedda

Area
  - Total: 5.57 km^{2} (2.15 sq mi)
- Elevation: 165 m (541 ft)

Population (2026)
  - Total: 80
  - Density: 14/km^{2} (37/sq mi)
- Demonyms: Baradilesi; Bobadriesus
- Time zone: UTC+1 (CET)
  - Summer (DST): UTC+2 (CEST)
- Postal code: 09090
- Dialing code: 0783

Baradili (Sardinian: Bobadri) is a village and comune (municipality) in the Province of Oristano in the autonomous island region of Sardinia in Italy, located about 60 kilometres (37 mi) northwest of Cagliari and about 35 kilometres (22 mi) southeast of Oristano. With 80 inhabitants, it is the smallest municipality of Sardinia by population.

Baradili borders the municipalities of Baressa, Genuri, Gonnosnò, Sini, Turri, and Ussaramanna.

== Demographics ==
As of 2026, the population is 80, of which 50% are male, and 50% are female. Minors make up 11.2% of the population, and seniors make up 31.2%.

Historical population

Year	Pop.	±%
1861	123	—
1871	127	+3.3%
1881	128	+0.8%
1901	120	−6.2%
1911	168	+40.0%
1921	162	−3.6%
1931	186	+14.8%
1936	198	+6.5%

Year	Pop.	±%
1951	210	+6.1%
1961	188	−10.5%
1971	159	−15.4%
1981	136	−14.5%
1991	119	−12.5%
2001	95	−20.2%
2011	90	−5.3%
2021	76	−15.6%

Source: ISTAT

=== Immigration ===
As of 2025, of the known countries of birth of 76 residents, the most numerous are: Italy (73 – 96.1%) and Ghana (3 – 3.9%).
