= Setzu =

- Comune
- Comune di Setzu
- Location within Sardinia
- Coordinates: 39°43′N 8°56′E
- Country: Italy
- Region: Sardinia
- Province: Medio Campidano

Government
  - Mayor: Francesco Cotza

Area
  - Total: 7.77 km^{2} (3.00 sq mi)
- Elevation: 206 m (676 ft)

Population (2026)
  - Total: 127
  - Density: 16.3/km^{2} (42.3/sq mi)
- Demonym: Setzesi
- Time zone: UTC+1 (CET)
  - Summer (DST): UTC+2 (CEST)
- Postal code: 09029
- Dialing code: 070
- Website: Official website

Setzu is a village and comune (municipality) in the Province of Medio Campidano in the autonomous island region of Sardinia in Italy, located about 60 kilometres (37 mi) northwest of Cagliari and about 15 kilometres (9 mi) north of Sanluri. It has 127 inhabitants.

Setzu borders the municipalities of Genoni, Genuri, Gesturi, Tuili, and Turri.

== Demographics ==
As of 2026, the population is 127, of which 51.2% are male, and 48.8% are female. Minors make up 11.8% of the population, and seniors make up 33.9%.

Historical population

Year	Pop.	±%
1861	302	—
1871	330	+9.3%
1881	276	−16.4%
1901	240	−13.0%
1911	292	+21.7%
1921	267	−8.6%
1931	304	+13.9%
1936	325	+6.9%

Year	Pop.	±%
1951	278	−14.5%
1961	278	+0.0%
1971	223	−19.8%
1981	223	+0.0%
1991	189	−15.2%
2001	166	−12.2%
2011	144	−13.3%
2021	133	−7.6%

Source: ISTAT

=== Immigration ===
As of 2025, immigrants make up 2.3% of the population. The foreign countries of birth are Albania, India, and Mali.
