= Genuri =

Genuri Giauni (Sardinian)
- Comune
- Comune di Genuri
- Location within Sardinia
- Coordinates: 39°45′N 8°55′E
- Country: Italy
- Region: Sardinia
- Province: Medio Campidano

Area
  - Total: 7.52 km^{2} (2.90 sq mi)
- Elevation: 243 m (797 ft)

Population (2026)
  - Total: 295
  - Density: 39.2/km^{2} (102/sq mi)
- Demonym: Genuresi
- Time zone: UTC+1 (CET)
  - Summer (DST): UTC+2 (CEST)
- Postal code: 09020
- Dialing code: 070

Genuri (Sardinian: Giauni) is a village and comune (municipality) in the Province of Medio Campidano in the autonomous island region of Sardinia in Italy, located about 60 kilometres (37 mi) northwest of Cagliari and about 20 kilometres (12 mi) north of Sanluri. It has 295 inhabitants.

Genuri borders the municipalities of Baradili, Genoni, Setzu, Sini, and Turri.

== Demographics ==
As of 2026, the population is 295, of which 47.8% are male, and 52.2% are female. Minors make up 9.8% of the population, and seniors make up 43.7%.

Historical population

Year	Pop.	±%
1861	359	—
1871	400	+11.4%
1881	434	+8.5%
1901	383	−11.8%
1911	440	+14.9%
1921	446	+1.4%
1931	535	+20.0%
1936	575	+7.5%

Year	Pop.	±%
1951	654	+13.7%
1961	706	+8.0%
1971	567	−19.7%
1981	518	−8.6%
1991	444	−14.3%
2001	386	−13.1%
2011	345	−10.6%
2021	314	−9.0%

Source: ISTAT

=== Immigration ===
As of 2025, immigrants make up 3.4% of the total population. The 5 largest foreign countries of birth are Romania, Morocco, Germany, Kyrgyzstan, and the Philippines.
