= Sini, Sardinia =

Sini
- Comune
- Comune di Sini
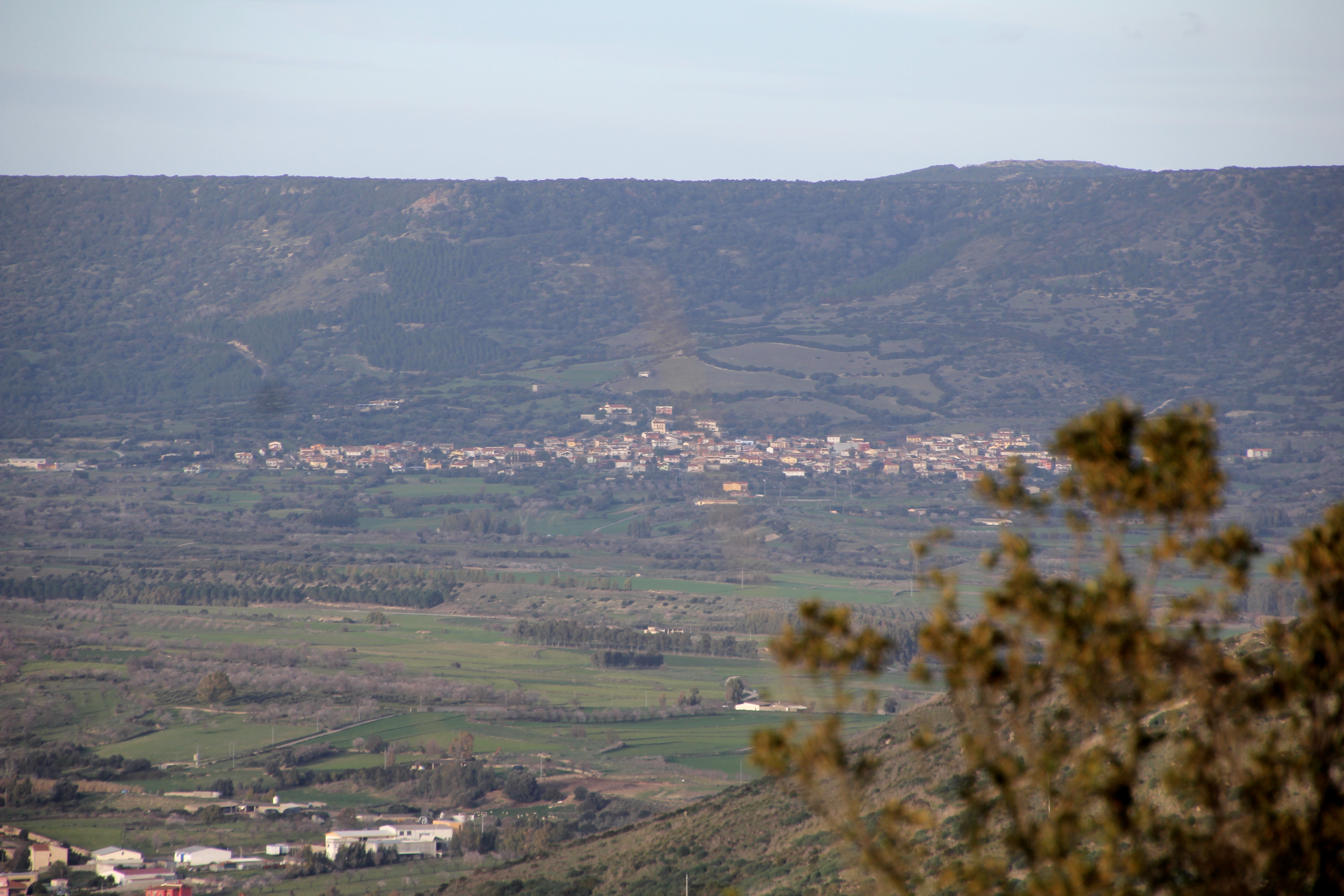

- Location within Sardinia
- Coordinates: 39°45′N 8°54′E
- Country: Italy
- Region: Sardinia
- Province: Province of Oristano (OR)

Area
  - Total: 8.7 km^{2} (3.4 sq mi)

Population (31 Jul. 2025)
  - Total: 545
  - Density: 63/km^{2} (160/sq mi)
- Time zone: UTC+1 (CET)
  - Summer (DST): UTC+2 (CEST)
- Postal code: 09090
- Dialing code: 0783
- Patron saint: Santa Chiara

Sini is a comune (municipality) in the Province of Oristano in the Italian region Sardinia, located about 60 kilometres (37 mi) northwest of Cagliari and about 30 kilometres (19 mi) southeast of Oristano. As of July 2021, it had a population of 545 and an area of 8.7 square kilometres (3.4 mi^{2}) in December 2004.

Sini borders the following municipalities: Baradili, Genoni, Genuri, and Gonnosnò.

== Demographic evolution ==
Historical population

Year	Pop.	±%
1861	600	—
1871	586	−2.3%
1881	663	+13.1%
1901	687	+3.6%
1911	771	+12.2%

Year	Pop.	±%
1921	739	−4.2%
1931	799	+8.1%
1936	825	+3.3%
1951	993	+20.4%
1961	959	−3.4%

Year	Pop.	±%
1971	793	−17.3%
1981	767	−3.3%
1991	679	−11.5%
2001	597	−12.1%

Source: Data from ISTAT
