= Ussaramanna =

Ussaramanna Soramanna (Sardinian)
- Comune
- Comune di Ussaramanna
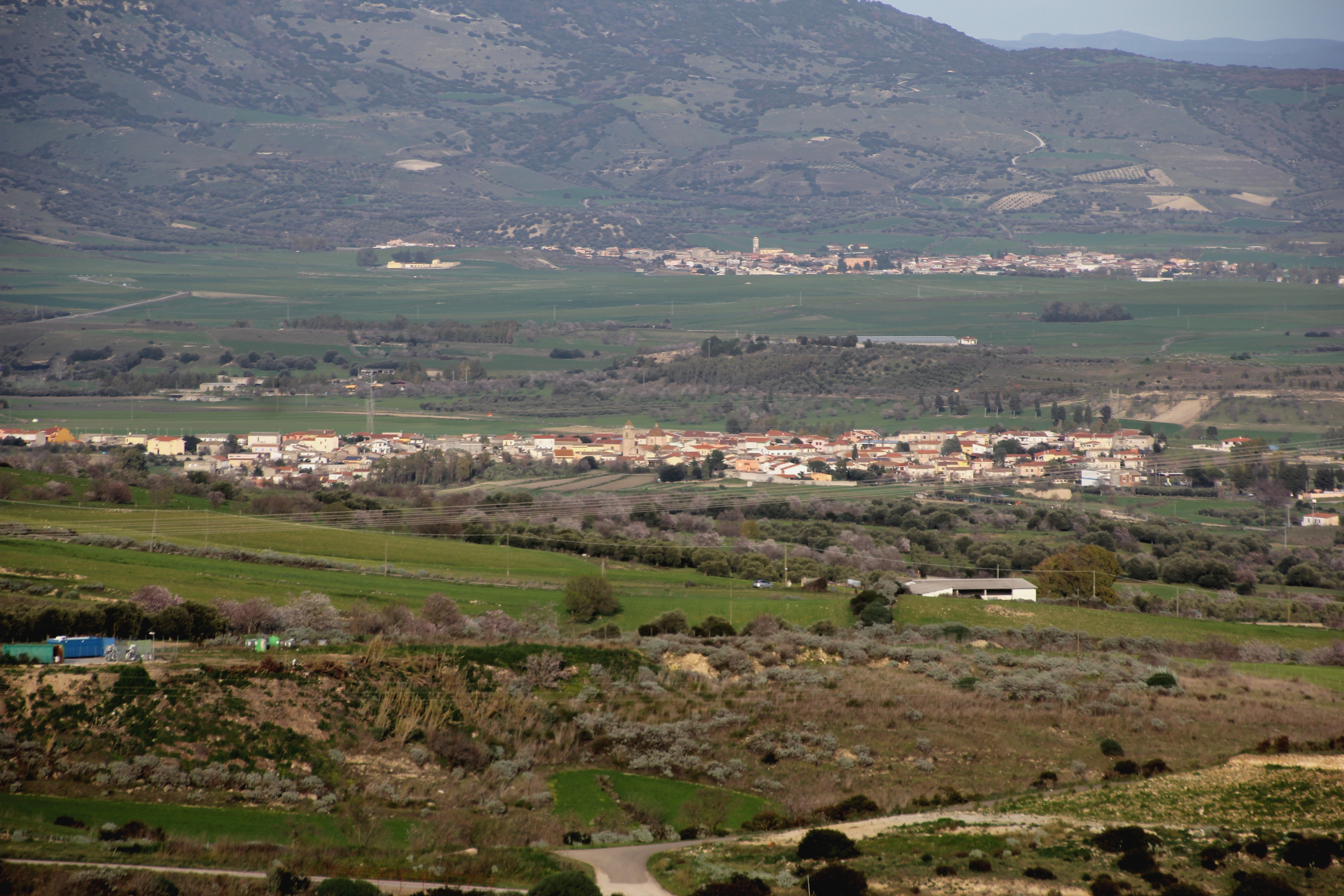
- View of Ussaramanna

- Coat of arms

- Location within Sardinia
- Coordinates: 39°42′N 8°55′E
- Country: Italy
- Region: Sardinia
- Province: Medio Campidano

Government
  - Mayor: Tiziano Schirru

Area
  - Total: 9.76 km^{2} (3.77 sq mi)
- Elevation: 157 m (515 ft)

Population (2026)
  - Total: 466
  - Density: 47.7/km^{2} (124/sq mi)
- Demonym: Ussaramannesi
- Time zone: UTC+1 (CET)
  - Summer (DST): UTC+2 (CEST)
- Postal code: 09020
- Dialing code: 0783

Ussaramanna (Sardinian: Soramanna) is a village and comune (municipality) in the Province of Medio Campidano in the autonomous island region of Sardinia in Italy, located about 60 kilometres (37 mi) northwest of Cagliari and about 15 kilometres (9 mi) north of Sanluri. It has 466 inhabitants.

The economy is based on agriculture, with the production of vine and olive oil. The municipal territory is home to the San Pietro nuraghe, at 165 metres (541 ft) above sea level.

Ussaramanna borders the municipalities of Baradili, Baressa, Pauli Arbarei, Siddi, and Turri.

== Demographics ==
As of 2026, the population is 466, of which 51.1% are male, and 48.9% are female. Minors make up 8.2% of the population, and seniors make up 37.6%.

Historical population

Year	Pop.	±%
1861	623	—
1871	640	+2.7%
1881	609	−4.8%
1901	586	−3.8%
1911	677	+15.5%
1921	730	+7.8%
1931	790	+8.2%
1936	863	+9.2%

Year	Pop.	±%
1951	920	+6.6%
1961	963	+4.7%
1971	835	−13.3%
1981	714	−14.5%
1991	656	−8.1%
2001	611	−6.9%
2011	556	−9.0%
2021	492	−11.5%

Source: ISTAT

=== Immigration ===
As of 2025, immigrants make up 3.9% of the population. The 5 largest foreign countries of birth are Spain, Switzerland, Belgium, Ecuador, and Morocco.
