= Las Plassas =

Las Plassas Is Pratzas (Sardinian)
- Comune
- Comune di Las Plassas
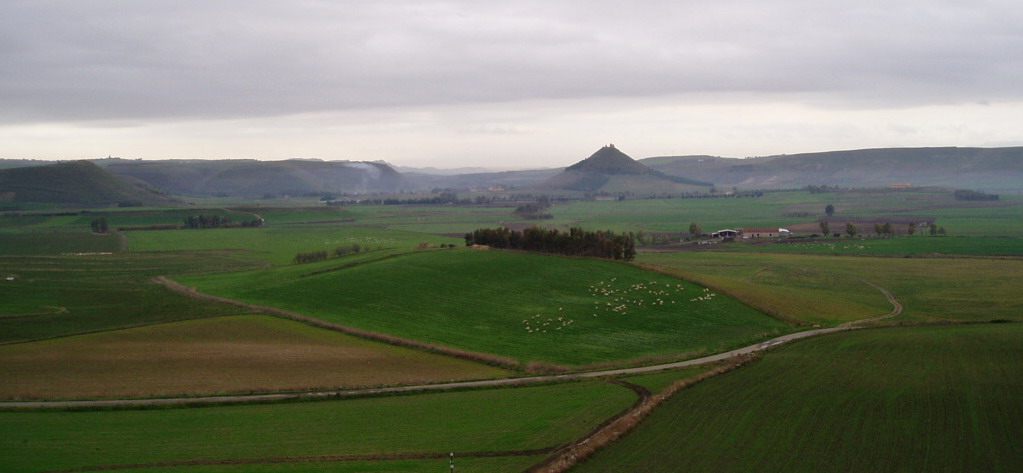
- Campidano plain near Las Plassas

- Location within Sardinia
- Coordinates: 39°41′N 8°59′E
- Country: Italy
- Region: Sardinia
- Province: Medio Campidano

Government
  - Mayor: Ernesto Nocco

Area
  - Total: 11.04 km^{2} (4.26 sq mi)
- Elevation: 148 m (486 ft)

Population (2026)
  - Total: 208
  - Density: 18.8/km^{2} (48.8/sq mi)
- Demonym: Lasplassesi
- Time zone: UTC+1 (CET)
  - Summer (DST): UTC+2 (CEST)
- Postal code: 09020
- Dialing code: 070
- Website: Official website

Las Plassas (Sardinian: Is Pratzas) is a village and comune (municipality) in the Province of Medio Campidano in the autonomous island region of Sardinia in Italy, located about 50 kilometres (31 miles) north of Cagliari and about 15 kilometres (9 miles) northeast of Sanluri. It has 208 inhabitants.

Las Plassas borders the municipalities of Barumini, Pauli Arbarei, Tuili, Villamar, and Villanovafranca.

== Demographics ==
As of 2026, the population is 208, of which 52.9% are male, and 47.1% are female. Minors make up 9.6% of the population, and seniors make up 35.6%.

Historical population

Year	Pop.	±%
1861	486	—
1871	459	−5.6%
1881	429	−6.5%
1901	397	−7.5%
1911	454	+14.4%
1921	500	+10.1%
1931	587	+17.4%
1936	502	−14.5%

Year	Pop.	±%
1951	566	+12.7%
1961	632	+11.7%
1971	379	−40.0%
1981	298	−21.4%
1991	317	+6.4%
2001	269	−15.1%
2011	257	−4.5%
2021	215	−16.3%

Source: ISTAT

=== Immigration ===
As of 2025, immigrants make up 1.9% of the population. The foreign countries of birth are Brazil, Germany, Romania, and Switzerland.
