= Tuili =

- Comune
- Comune di Tuili
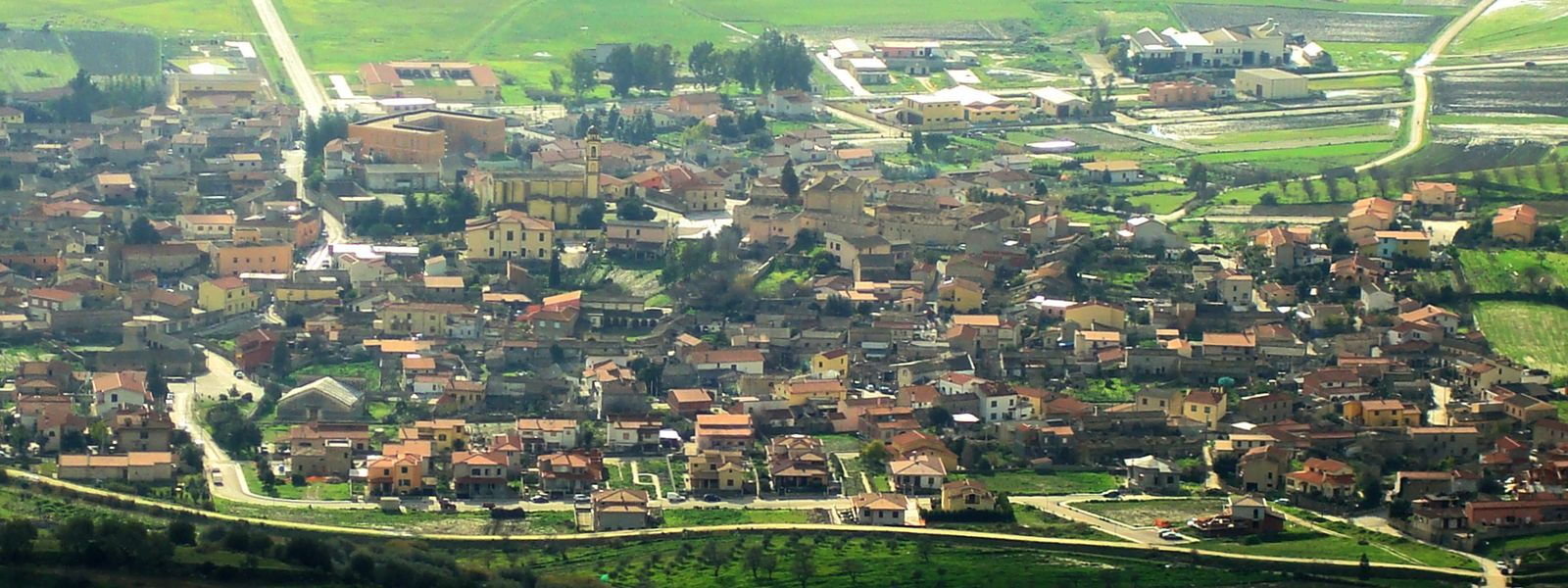
- View of Tuili

- Coat of arms

- Location within Sardinia
- Coordinates: 39°43′N 8°58′E
- Country: Italy
- Region: Sardinia
- Province: Medio Campidano

Government
  - Mayor: Celestino Pitzalis

Area
  - Total: 24.59 km^{2} (9.49 sq mi)
- Elevation: 208 m (682 ft)

Population (2026)
  - Total: 882
  - Density: 35.9/km^{2} (92.9/sq mi)
- Demonym: Tuilesi
- Time zone: UTC+1 (CET)
  - Summer (DST): UTC+2 (CEST)
- Postal code: 09029
- Dialing code: 070
- Patron saint: St. Peter
- Saint day: 29 June
- Website: Official website

Tuili is a town and comune (municipality) in the Province of Medio Campidano in the autonomous island region of Sardinia in Italy, located about 60 kilometres (37 mi) north of Cagliari and about 20 kilometres (12 mi) northeast of Sanluri. It has 882 inhabitants.

Tuili borders the municipalities of Barumini, Gesturi, Las Plassas, Pauli Arbarei, Setzu, and Turri.

== Demographics ==
As of 2026, the population is 882, of which 49.0% are male, and 51.0% are female. Minors make up 9.5% of the population, and seniors make up 37.8%.

Historical population

Year	Pop.	±%
1861	1,334	—
1871	1,286	−3.6%
1881	1,242	−3.4%
1901	1,320	+6.3%
1911	1,330	+0.8%
1921	1,302	−2.1%
1931	1,478	+13.5%
1936	1,613	+9.1%

Year	Pop.	±%
1951	1,713	+6.2%
1961	1,591	−7.1%
1971	1,348	−15.3%
1981	1,347	−0.1%
1991	1,263	−6.2%
2001	1,185	−6.2%
2011	1,062	−10.4%
2021	948	−10.7%

Source: ISTAT

=== Immigration ===
As of 2025, immigrants make up 2.4% of the population. The 5 largest foreign countries of birth are Romania, Belgium, Switzerland, Peru, and China.
