= Lunamatrona =

- Comune
- Comune di Lunamatrona
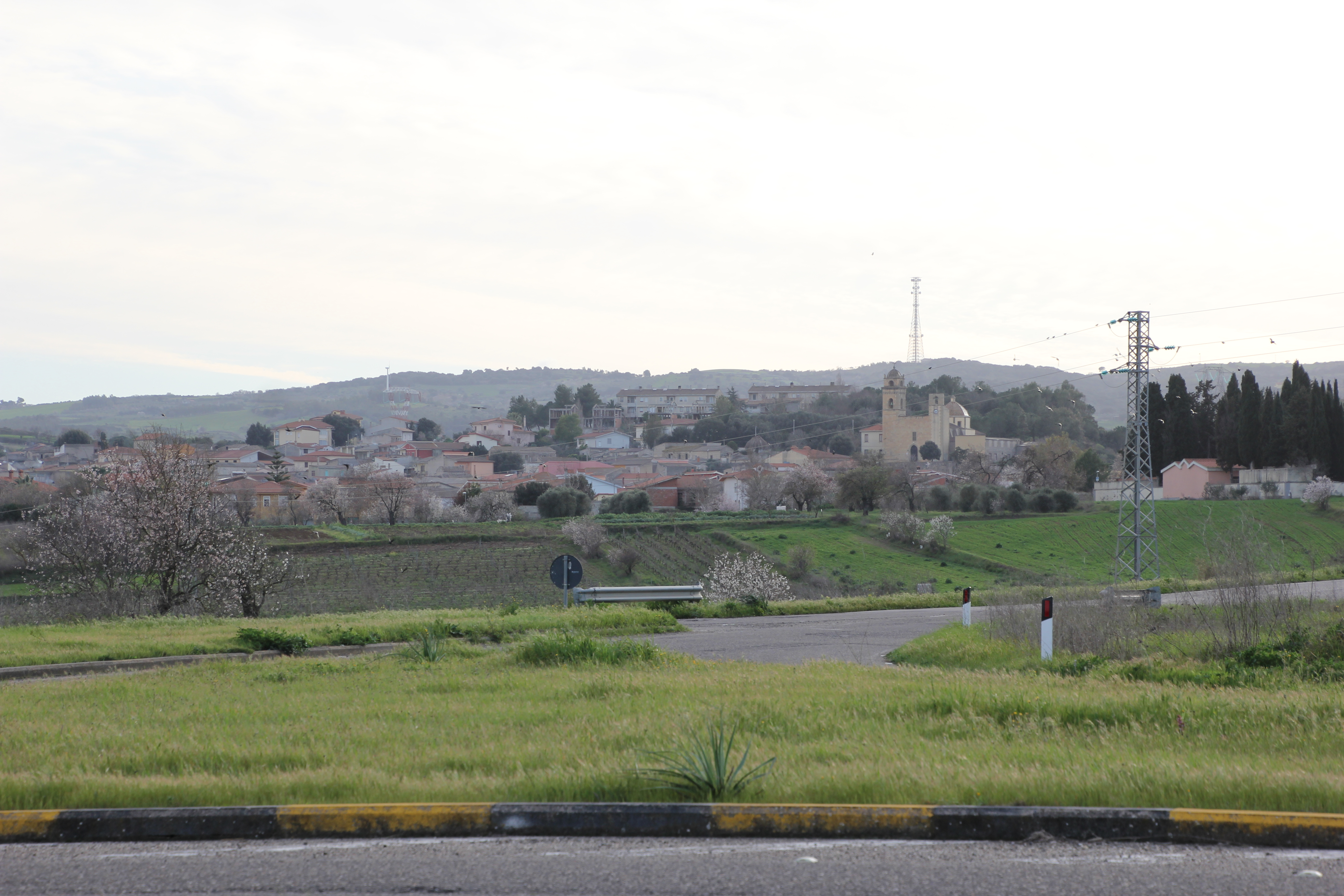
- View of Lunamatrona

- Coat of arms

- Location within Sardinia
- Coordinates: 39°39′N 8°54′E
- Country: Italy
- Region: Sardinia
- Province: Medio Campidano

Government
  - Mayor: Italo Carruciu

Area
  - Total: 20.59 km^{2} (7.95 sq mi)
- Elevation: 180 m (590 ft)

Population (2026)
  - Total: 1,582
  - Density: 76.83/km^{2} (199.0/sq mi)
- Demonym: Lunamatronesi
- Time zone: UTC+1 (CET)
  - Summer (DST): UTC+2 (CEST)
- Postal code: 09022
- Dialing code: 070
- Website: Official website

Lunamatrona is a town and comune (municipality) in the Province of Medio Campidano in the autonomous island region of Sardinia in Italy, located about 50 kilometres (31 mi) northwest of Cagliari and about 9 kilometres (6 mi) north of Sanluri, in the inner Marmilla plain. It has 1,582 inhabitants.

Lunamatrona borders the municipalities of Collinas, Pauli Arbarei, Sanluri, Siddi, Villamar, and Villanovaforru.

== Demographics ==
As of 2026, the population is 1,582, of which 48.7% are male, and 51.3% are female. Minors make up 10.4% of the population, and seniors make up 35.3%.

Historical population

Year	Pop.	±%
1861	968	—
1871	1,018	+5.2%
1881	1,104	+8.4%
1901	1,148	+4.0%
1911	1,299	+13.2%
1921	1,278	−1.6%
1931	1,467	+14.8%
1936	1,640	+11.8%

Year	Pop.	±%
1951	1,948	+18.8%
1961	2,017	+3.5%
1971	1,850	−8.3%
1981	1,896	+2.5%
1991	1,896	+0.0%
2001	1,858	−2.0%
2011	1,783	−4.0%
2021	1,649	−7.5%

Source: ISTAT

=== Immigration ===
As of 2025, immigrants make up 2.1% of the population. The 5 largest foreign countries of birth are France, Morocco, the United Kingdom, Belgium, and Brazil.
