= Province of Medio Campidano =

Coordinates: 39.5667°N 8.9000°E

Province of Medio Campidano Provincia del Medio Campidano (Italian) Provìntzia de su Campidanu de Mesu (Sardinian)
- Province
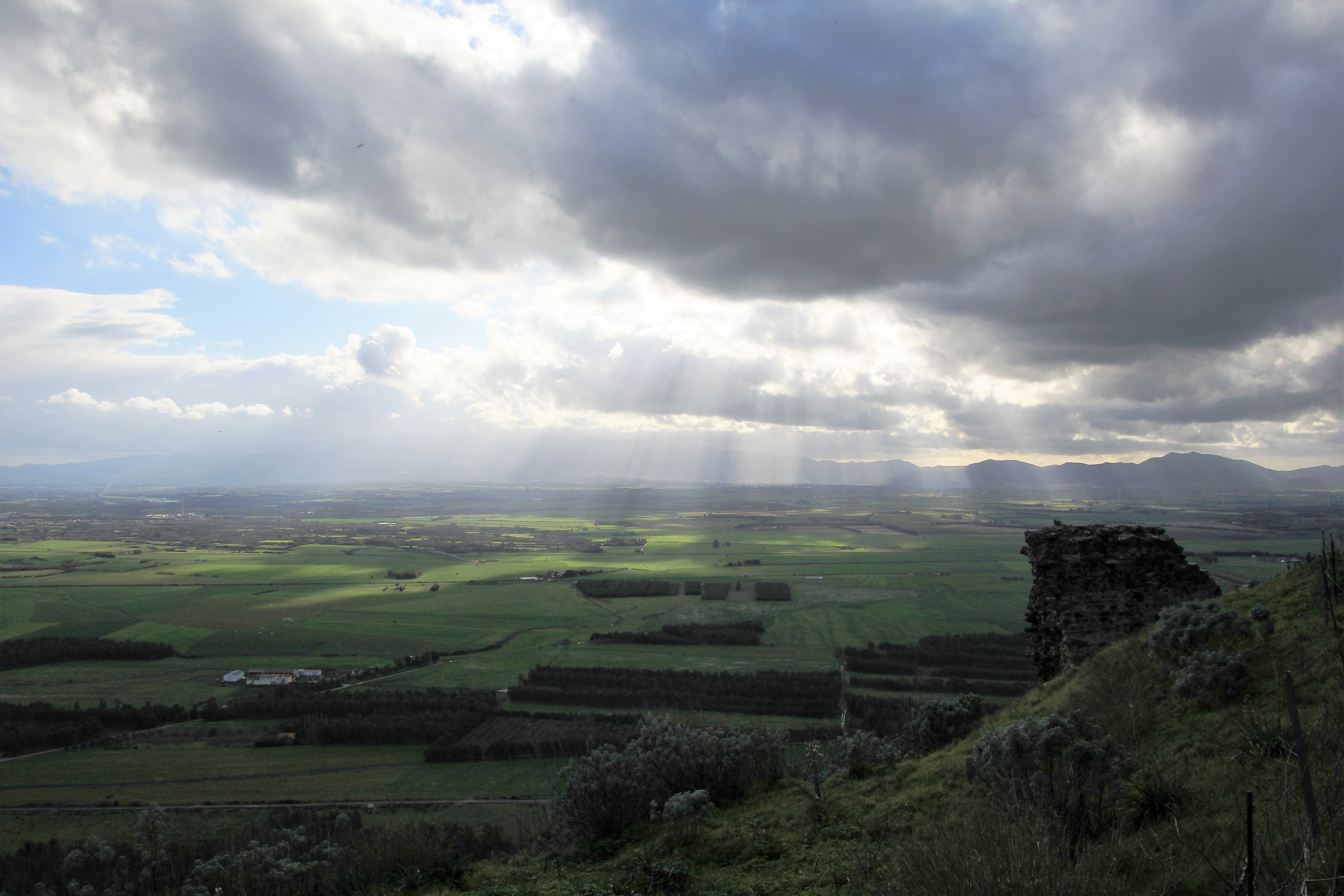

- Location of the province of Medio Campidano in Italy
- Country: Italy
- Region: Sardinia
- Established: May 2005
- Disestablished: 4 February 2016
- Re-established: 16 April 2021
- Functional since: 1 June 2025
- Capital(s): Sanluri and Villacidro
- Municipalities: 28

Government
  - President: Francesco Sanna

Area
  - Total: 1,517.34 km^{2} (585.85 sq mi)

Population (2026)
  - Total: 89,155
  - Density: 58.757/km^{2} (152.18/sq mi)

GDP
  - Total: €1.434 billion (2015)
  - Per capita: €14,379 (2015)
- Time zone: UTC+1 (CET)
  - Summer (DST): UTC+2 (CEST)
- ISO 3166 code: VS
- ISTAT code: 117

The province of Medio Campidano (Italian: provincia del Medio Campidano; Sardinian: provìntzia de su Campidanu de Mesu; both lit. 'province of the Middle Campidano') is a province in the autonomous island region of Sardinia in Italy. As of 2026, the province has a population of 89,155 over an area of 1,517.34 square kilometres (585.85 mi^{2}), giving it a population density of 58 inhabitants per square kilometer. It has two capitals, Villacidro and Sanluri. It has 28 municipalities. It was established in 2005 from a section of the province of Cagliari. Medio Campidano was disestablished as a province by a 2016 Regional Decree and was integrated into the newly founded province of South Sardinia, however it was re-established on 1 June 2025 per a 2021 decree.

The province contains e.g. the Nuragic archaeological site Su Nuraxi in Barumini, which was included in the UNESCO list of World Heritage Sites in 1997.

== History ==
The formation of the province was announced in 2001 by the Autonomous Region of Sardinia and it officially became a province in May 2005 from a section of the province of Cagliari. On 6 May 2012 the regional referendums of Sardinia took place regarding the abolition of certain provinces and a variety of other matters. The suggestion of reforming or abolishing certain provinces in Sardinia was approved by the Regional Council of Sardinia on 24 May 2012. Due to this, the province of Medio Campidano was ordered to form a new administrative body or be abolished on 1 March 2013, but this expiry date for constitutional changes was extended to 1 July 2013. It later formed a new administrative body.

On 12 April 2021, under Sardinian Regional Council's Regional Law Nr. 7, the province was restored. Whilst the Italian government challenged the law, thus stalling its implementation, on 12 March 2022, the Constitutional Court ruled in favor of the Autonomous Region of Sardinia. On 13 April 2023, the regional council, at the proposal of the regional government, approved an amendment to the 2021 reform, defining the timeframe and manner of its implementation, which became effective on 1 June 2025.

== Geography ==
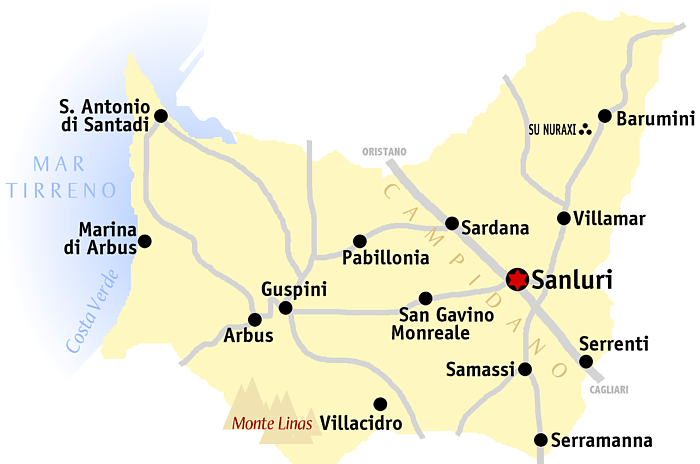
Towns and roads of the province of Medio Campidano

The province of Medio Campidano is on the west side of the Island of Sardinia, with a coastline on the Mediterranean Sea. To the north is the province of Oristano, to the east the province of Cagliari and to the south, the provinces of Carbonia-Iglesias and Cagliari. The total area of Medio Campidano is 1,516 square kilometres (585 mi^{2}), some 6.3% of the whole island. It is divided into 28 comuni (municipalities). The capitals are Sanluri in the east and Villacidro in the south. The environment is diverse, with mountains, hills, plains and coastline. The province is one of the least populated and most unspoilt areas of the island and has earned the name, the "Green Province".

The mining industry began to develop in the province in the nineteenth century due to the large lead, copper and silver reserves, but the industry became uneconomical after World War II and all that now remains is the industrial heritage. In the more hilly districts, olives and grapes are grown and Sardinia is known for the breeding of sheep. The Campidano Plain is used for cropping and produces rice, maize and sorghum.

== Government ==
=== Municipalities ===
The province has 28 municipalities:

- Arbus
- Barumini
- Collinas
- Furtei
- Genuri
- Gesturi
- Gonnosfanadiga
- Guspini
- Las Plassas
- Lunamatrona
- Pabillonis
- Pauli Arbarei
- Samassi
- San Gavino Monreale
- Sanluri
- Sardara
- Segariu
- Serramanna
- Serrenti
- Setzu
- Siddi
- Tuili
- Turri
- Ussaramanna
- Villacidro
- Villamar
- Villanovaforru
- Villanovafranca

== Demographics ==
As of 2026, the population is 89,155, of which 49.7% are male, and 50.3% are female. Minors make up 11.4% of the population, and seniors make up 30.1%.

Historical population

Year	Pop.	±%
1861	50,800	—
1871	50,468	−0.7%
1881	54,109	+7.2%
1901	58,545	+8.2%
1911	66,268	+13.2%
1921	65,759	−0.8%
1931	73,980	+12.5%
1936	79,418	+7.4%

Year	Pop.	±%
1951	97,687	+23.0%
1961	103,896	+6.4%
1971	103,268	−0.6%
1981	109,383	+5.9%
1991	109,785	+0.4%
2001	105,400	−4.0%
2011	101,256	−3.9%
2021	92,660	−8.5%

Source: ISTAT

=== Immigration ===
As of 2025, the foreign-born population is 2,689, making up 3.0% of the total population.
