= Gesturi =

Gesturi Gèsturi (Sardinian)
- Comune
- Comune di Gesturi
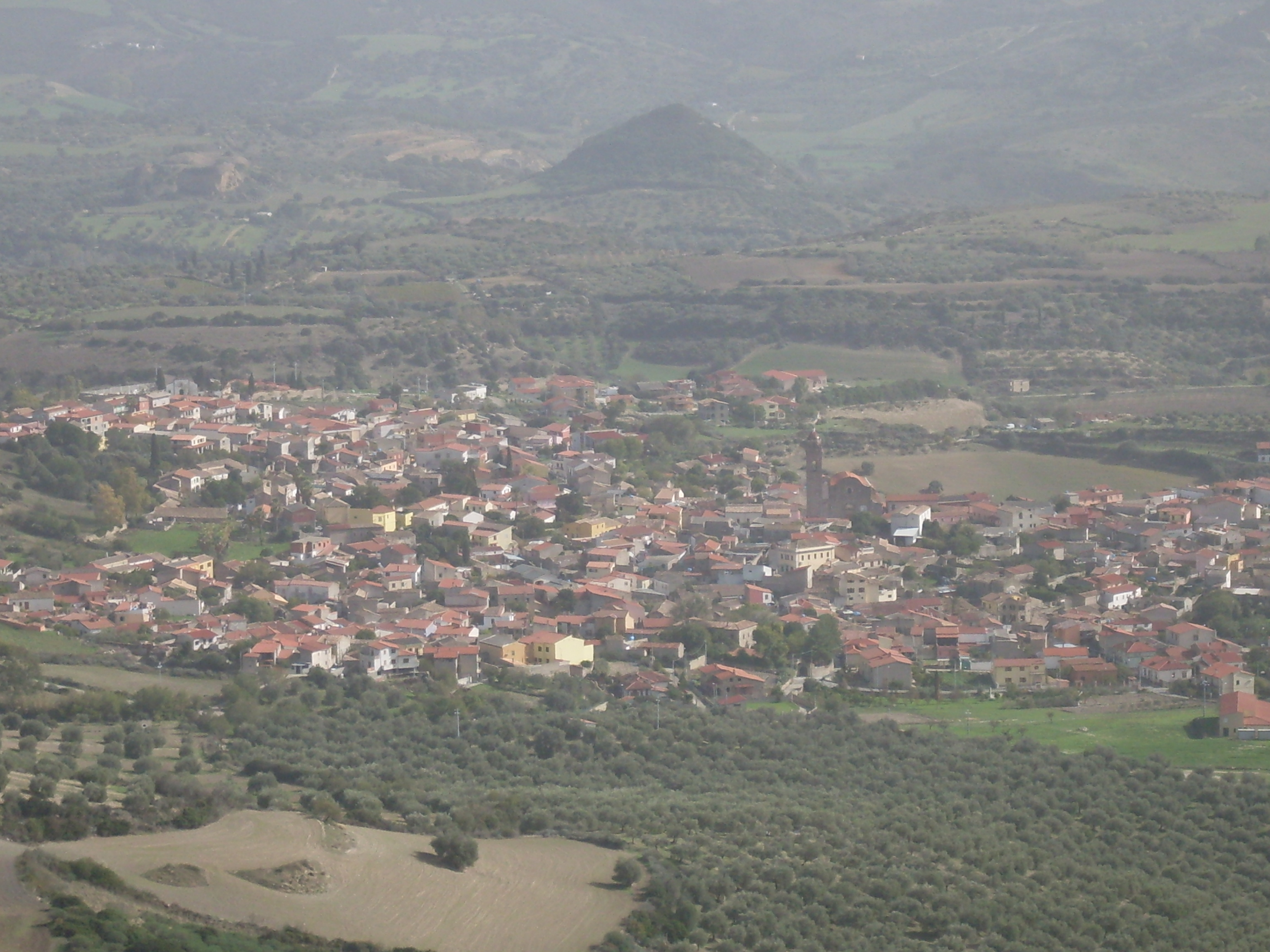
- View of Gesturi from Chiara

- Location within Sardinia
- Coordinates: 39°44′N 9°1′E
- Country: Italy
- Region: Sardinia
- Province: Medio Campidano

Government
  - Mayor: Gianluca Sedda

Area
  - Total: 46.83 km^{2} (18.08 sq mi)
- Elevation: 310 m (1,020 ft)

Population (2026)
  - Total: 1,113
  - Density: 23.77/km^{2} (61.56/sq mi)
- Demonym: Gesturesi
- Time zone: UTC+1 (CET)
  - Summer (DST): UTC+2 (CEST)
- Postal code: 09020
- Dialing code: 070

Gesturi (Sardinian: Gèsturi) is a town and comune (municipality) in the Province of Medio Campidano in the autonomous island region of Sardinia in Italy, located about 60 kilometres (37 mi) north of Cagliari and about 20 kilometres (12 mi) northeast of Sanluri in the historical region of Marmilla. It has 1,113 inhabitants.

Gesturi borders the municipalities of Barumini, Genoni, Gergei, Isili, Nuragus, Setzu, and Tuili.

== Demographics ==
As of 2026, the population is 1,113, of which 49.4% are male, and 50.6% are female. Minors make up 12.7% of the population, and seniors make up 31.4%.

Historical population

Year	Pop.	±%
1861	1,660	—
1871	1,457	−12.2%
1881	1,430	−1.9%
1901	1,431	+0.1%
1911	1,507	+5.3%
1921	1,455	−3.5%
1931	1,643	+12.9%
1936	1,709	+4.0%

Year	Pop.	±%
1951	1,827	+6.9%
1961	1,801	−1.4%
1971	1,567	−13.0%
1981	1,515	−3.3%
1991	1,480	−2.3%
2001	1,430	−3.4%
2011	1,280	−10.5%
2021	1,164	−9.1%

Source: ISTAT

=== Immigration ===
As of 2025, immigrants make up 1.5% of the total population. The 5 largest foreign countries of birth are Switzerland, Australia, Romania, Ukraine, and the United Kingdom.
