= Nurallao =

Nurallao Nuradda
- Comune
- Comune di Nurallao
- Location within Sardinia
- Coordinates: 39°48′N 9°5′E
- Country: Italy
- Region: Sardinia
- Metropolitan city: Cagliari (CA)

Government
  - Mayor: Rita Porru

Area
  - Total: 34.7 km^{2} (13.4 sq mi)
- Elevation: 403 m (1,322 ft)

Population (31 December 2010)
  - Total: 1,356
  - Density: 39.1/km^{2} (101/sq mi)
- Demonym: Nurallaesi
- Time zone: UTC+1 (CET)
  - Summer (DST): UTC+2 (CEST)
- Postal code: 08030
- Dialing code: 0782

Nurallao (Sardinian: Nuradda) is a comune (municipality) in the Metropolitan City of Cagliari in the Italian region Sardinia, located about 60 kilometres (37 mi) north of Cagliari.

Nurallao borders the following municipalities: Isili, Laconi, Nuragus.

== "Giants' tomb" of Aiodda ==
The site of Aiodda is famous for its Nuragic-age megalithic "Giants' grave".
