= Barumini =

Barumini Barùmini (Sardinian)
- Comune
- Comune di Barumini
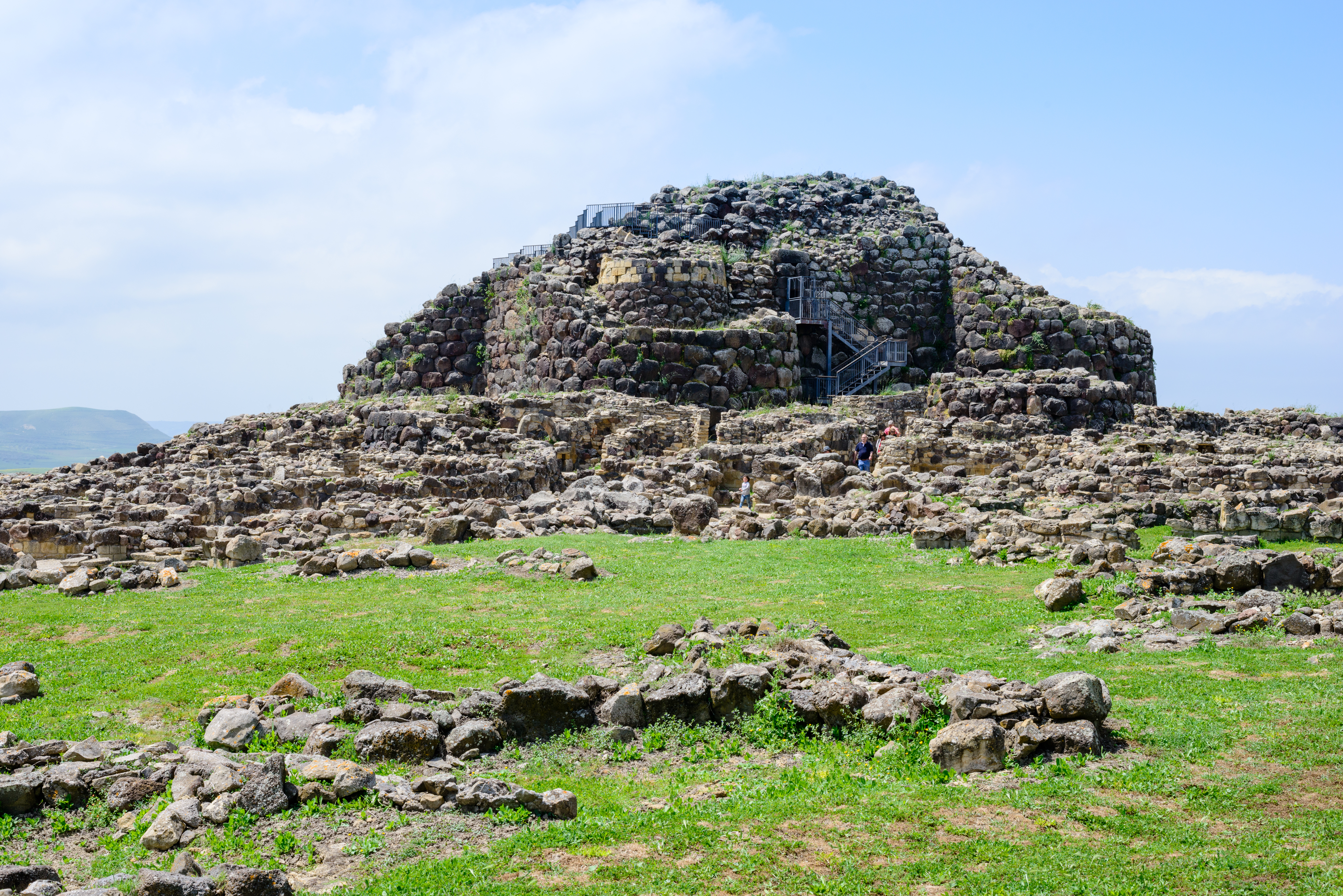
- Nuraghe Su Nuraxi

- Coat of arms

- Location within Sardinia
- Coordinates: 39°42′N 9°0′E
- Country: Italy
- Region: Sardinia
- Province: Medio Campidano

Government
  - Mayor: Emanuele Lilliu

Area
  - Total: 26.40 km^{2} (10.19 sq mi)
- Elevation: 202 m (663 ft)

Population (2026)
  - Total: 1,084
  - Density: 41.06/km^{2} (106.3/sq mi)
- Demonym: Baruminesi
- Time zone: UTC+1 (CET)
  - Summer (DST): UTC+2 (CEST)
- Postal code: 09021
- Dialing code: 070
- Website: Official website

Barumini (Sardinian: Barùmini) is a town and comune (municipality) in the Province of Medio Campidano in the autonomous island region of Sardinia in Italy, located about 50 kilometres (31 mi) north of Cagliari and about 15 kilometres (9 mi) northeast of Sanluri. It has 1,084 inhabitants.

Barumini borders the municipalities of Gergei, Gesturi, Las Plassas, Tuili, and Villanovafranca.

It is home to Su Nuraxi di Barumini, a Nuraghe complex listed in the UNESCO World Heritage Sites.

== Demographics ==
As of 2026, the population is 1,084, of which 51.0% are male, and 49.0% are female. Minors make up 10.4% of the population, and seniors make up 31.5%.

Historical population

Year	Pop.	±%
1861	1,214	—
1871	1,187	−2.2%
1881	1,221	+2.9%
1901	1,118	−8.4%
1911	1,179	+5.5%
1921	1,335	+13.2%
1931	1,445	+8.2%
1936	1,431	−1.0%

Year	Pop.	±%
1951	1,685	+17.7%
1961	1,729	+2.6%
1971	1,647	−4.7%
1981	1,516	−8.0%
1991	1,475	−2.7%
2001	1,413	−4.2%
2011	1,310	−7.3%
2021	1,176	−10.2%

Source: ISTAT

=== Immigration ===
As of 2025, immigrants make up 1.3% of the total population. The 5 largest foreign countries of birth are Morocco, Belgium, Moldova, Belarus, and Guatemala.

== Gallery ==
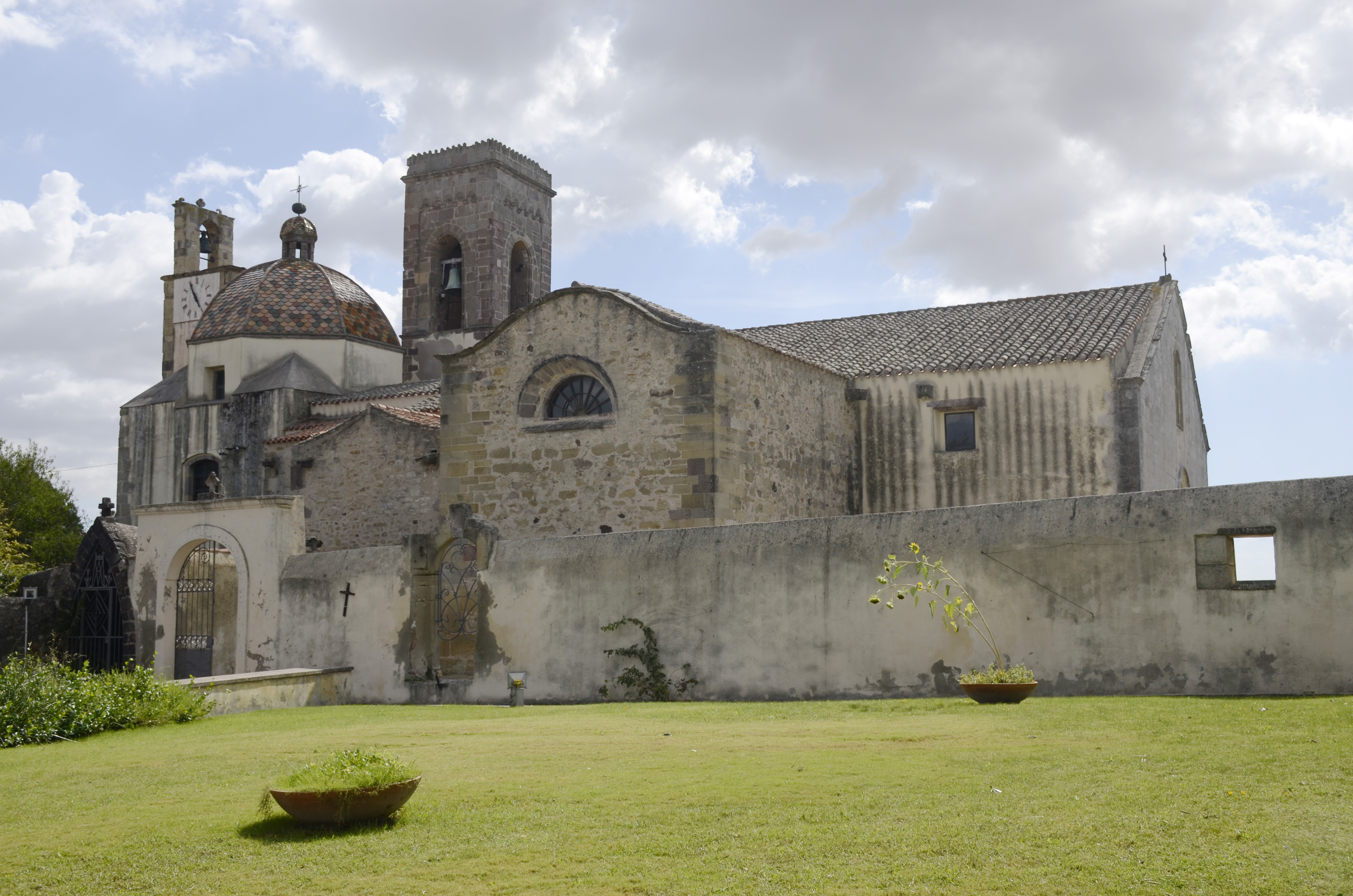
Parochial church of the "Vergine Immacolata“

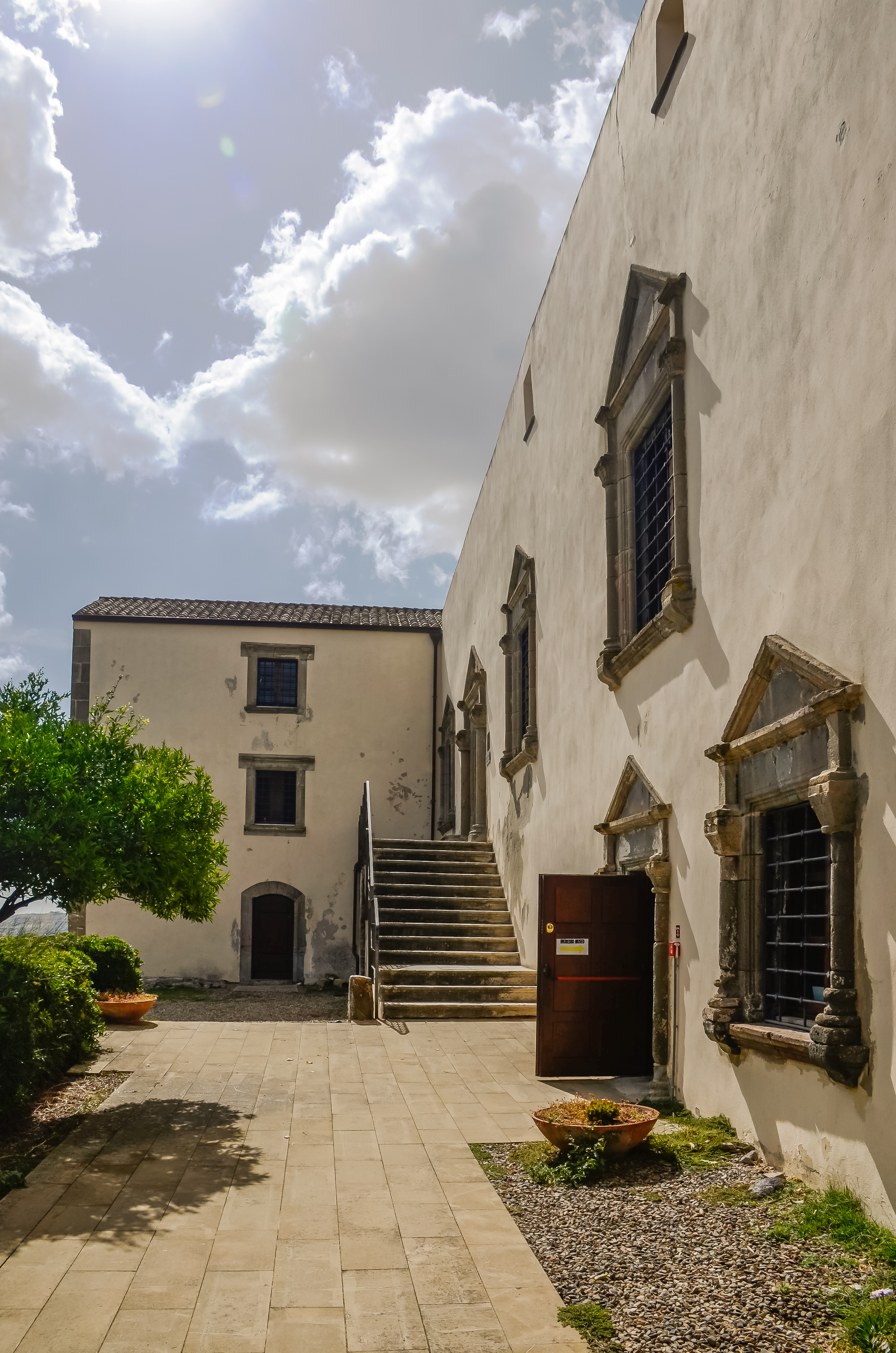
Palazzo Zapata

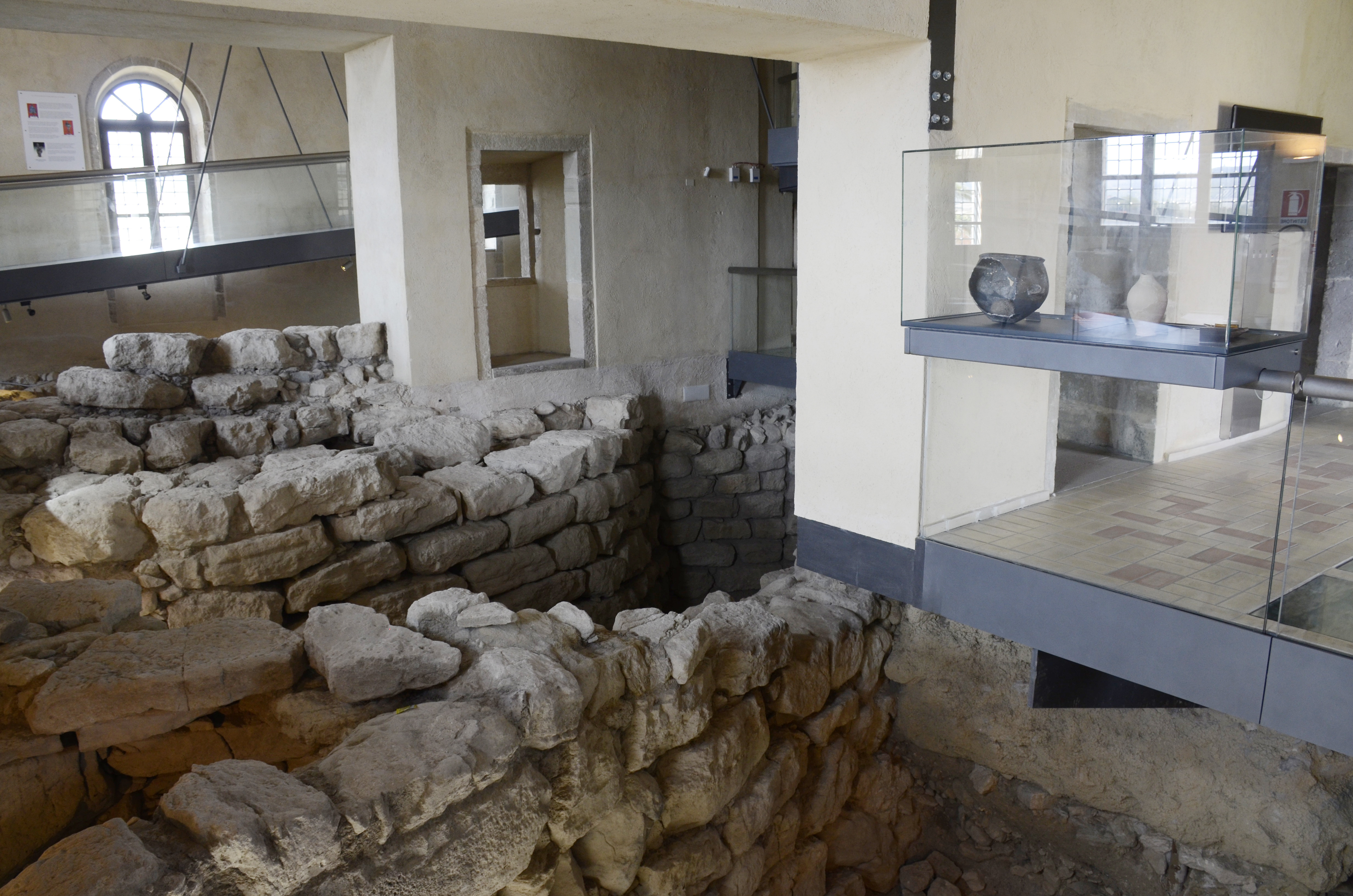
Palazzo Zapata

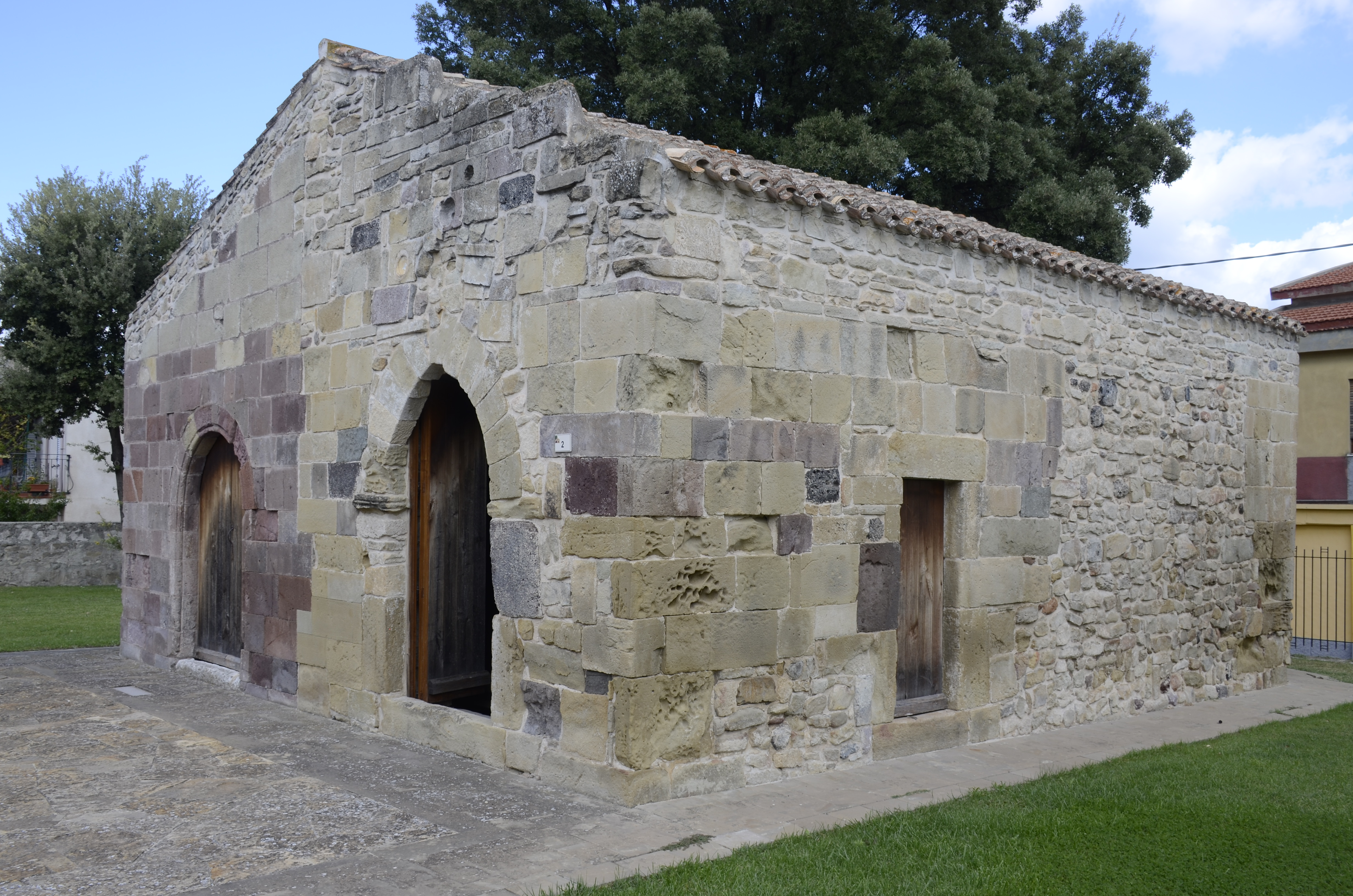
San Giovanni Batista
