= Genoni =

Genoni Geroni (Sardinian)
- Comune
- Comune di Genoni
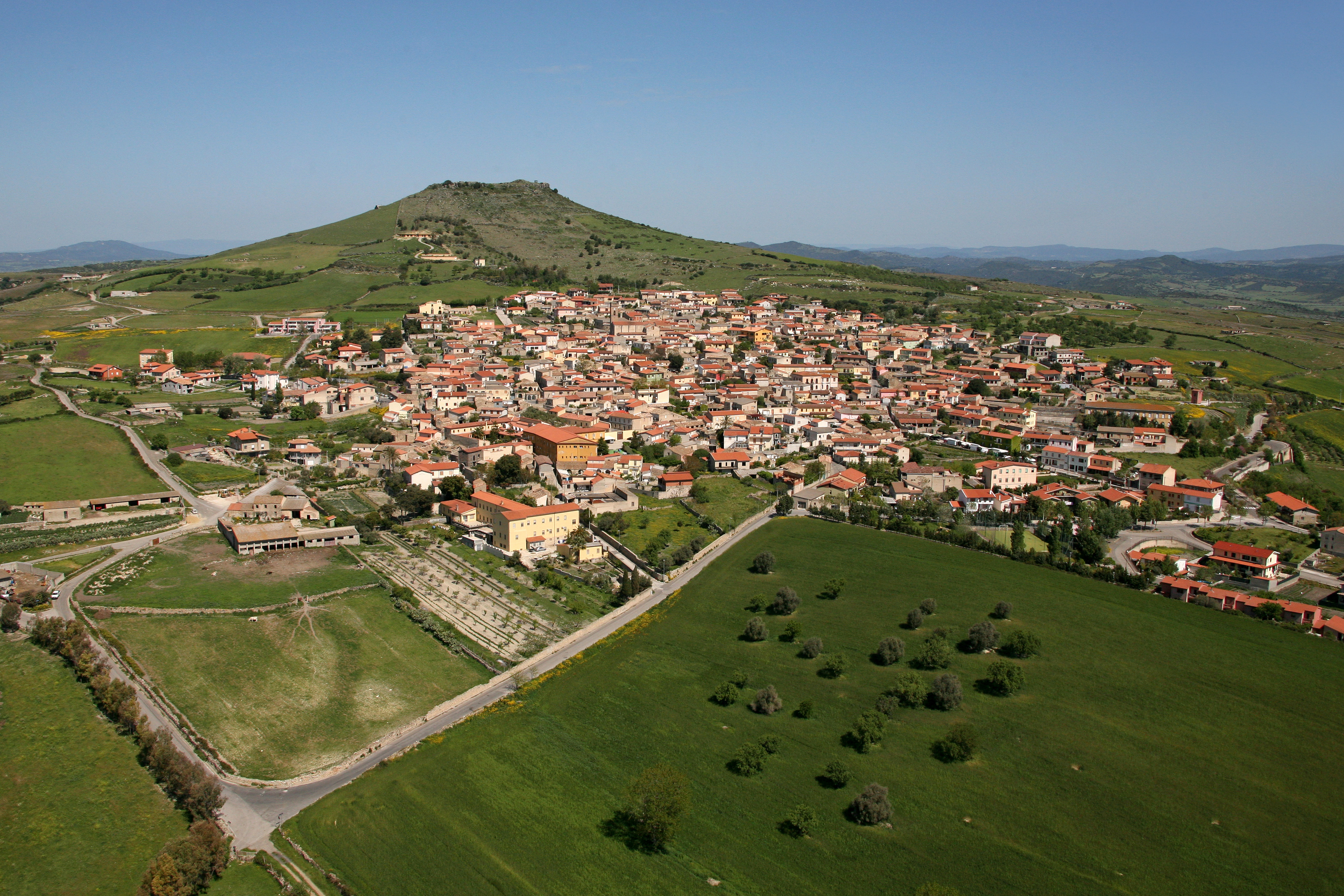
- View of Genoni

- Location within Sardinia
- Coordinates: 39°47′40″N 9°00′28″E
- Country: Italy
- Region: Sardinia
- Metropolitan city: Cagliari (CA)

Government
  - Mayor: Roberto Soddu

Area
  - Total: 43.79 km^{2} (16.91 sq mi)
- Elevation: 447 m (1,467 ft)

Population (2026)
  - Total: 716
  - Density: 16.4/km^{2} (42.3/sq mi)
- Demonym(s): Genonesi; Jaroesus/Geronesus
- Time zone: UTC+1 (CET)
  - Summer (DST): UTC+2 (CEST)
- Postal code: 08030
- Dialing code: 0782
- Website: Official website

Genoni (Sardinian: Geroni) is a village and comune (municipality) in the Metropolitan City of Cagliari in the autonomous island region of Sardinia in Italy, located about 70 kilometres (43 mi) north of Cagliari and about 35 kilometres (22 mi) southeast of Oristano. It has 716 inhabitants.

Genoni borders the municipalities of Albagiara, Assolo, Genuri, Gesturi, Gonnosnò, Laconi, Nuragus, Nureci, Setzu, and Sini.

== Demographics ==
As of 2026, the population is 716, of which 49.7% are male, and 50.3% are female. Minors make up 8.9% of the population, and seniors make up 39.4%.

Historical population

Year	Pop.	±%
1861	1,378	—
1871	1,359	−1.4%
1881	1,322	−2.7%
1901	1,203	−9.0%
1911	1,142	−5.1%
1921	1,153	+1.0%
1931	1,193	+3.5%
1936	1,290	+8.1%

Year	Pop.	±%
1951	1,536	+19.1%
1961	1,529	−0.5%
1971	1,339	−12.4%
1981	1,208	−9.8%
1991	1,103	−8.7%
2001	1,006	−8.8%
2011	885	−12.0%
2021	771	−12.9%

Source: ISTAT

=== Immigration ===
As of 2025, immigrants make up 3.4% of the total population. The 5 largest foreign countries of birth are India, Cape Verde, Cuba, Germany, and Switzerland.
