= Furtei =

Furtei Futei (Sardinian)
- Comune
- Comune di Furtei
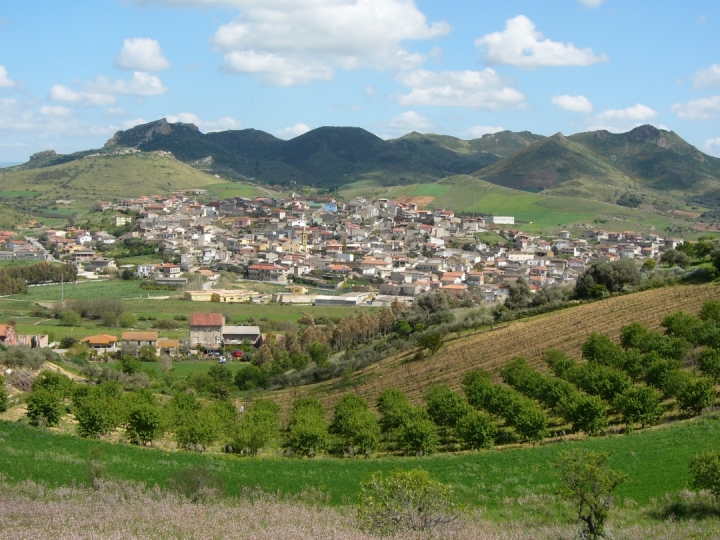
- View of Furtei

- Location within Sardinia
- Coordinates: 39°34′N 8°57′E
- Country: Italy
- Region: Sardinia
- Province: Medio Campidano

Area
  - Total: 26.11 km^{2} (10.08 sq mi)
- Elevation: 90 m (300 ft)

Population (2026)
  - Total: 1,474
  - Density: 56.45/km^{2} (146.2/sq mi)
- Demonym: Furteresi
- Time zone: UTC+1 (CET)
  - Summer (DST): UTC+2 (CEST)
- Postal code: 09040
- Dialing code: 070
- Website: Official website

Furtei (Sardinian: Futei) is a town and comune (municipality) in the Province of Medio Campidano in the autonomous island region of Sardinia in Italy, located about 40 kilometres (25 mi) northwest of Cagliari and about 4 kilometres (2 mi) east of Sanluri. It has 1,474 inhabitants.

Furtei borders the municipalities of Guasila, Samassi, Sanluri, Segariu, Serrenti, and Villamar.

== Demographics ==
As of 2026, the population is 1,474, of which 49.8% are male, and 50.2% are female. Minors make up 11.0% of the population, and seniors make up 31.0%.

Historical population

| Year | Pop. | ±% |
|---|---|---|
| 1861 | 1,030 | — |
| 1871 | 915 | −11.2% |
| 1881 | 981 | +7.2% |
| 1901 | 1,057 | +7.7% |
| 1911 | 1,118 | +5.8% |
| 1921 | 1,179 | +5.5% |
| 1931 | 1,280 | +8.6% |
| 1936 | 1,422 | +11.1% |

| Year | Pop. | ±% |
|---|---|---|
| 1951 | 1,728 | +21.5% |
| 1961 | 1,846 | +6.8% |
| 1971 | 1,788 | −3.1% |
| 1981 | 1,830 | +2.3% |
| 1991 | 1,793 | −2.0% |
| 2001 | 1,723 | −3.9% |
| 2011 | 1,674 | −2.8% |
| 2021 | 1,525 | −8.9% |

Source: ISTAT

=== Immigration ===
As of 2025, immigrants make up 2.8% of the total population. The 5 largest foreign countries of birth are Romania, Ukraine, Cuba, Germany, and Hungary.
