= Villamar =

Villamar Mara Arbarei (Sardinian)
- Comune
- Comune di Villamar
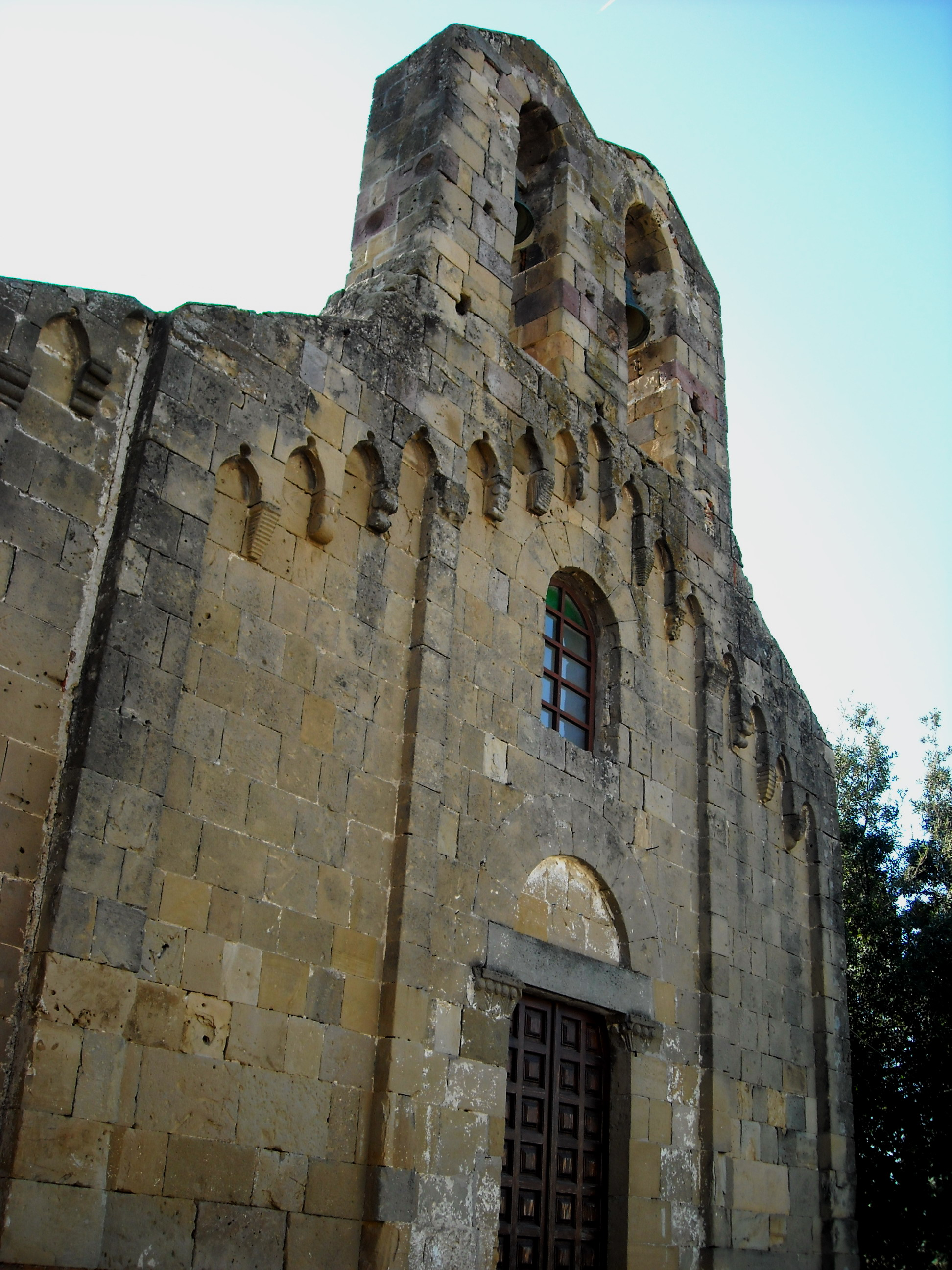
- Church of San Pietro

- Coat of arms

- Location within Sardinia
- Coordinates: 39°37′N 8°57′E
- Country: Italy
- Region: Sardinia
- Province: Medio Campidano

Government
  - Mayor: Pier Sandro Scano

Area
  - Total: 38.53 km^{2} (14.88 sq mi)

Population (2026)
  - Total: 2,392
  - Density: 62.08/km^{2} (160.8/sq mi)
- Demonym: Villamaresi
- Time zone: UTC+1 (CET)
  - Summer (DST): UTC+2 (CEST)
- Postal code: 09020
- Dialing code: 070
- Website: Official website

Villamar (Sardinian: Mara Arbarei) is a town and comune (municipality) in the Province of Medio Campidano in the autonomous island region of Sardinia in Italy, located about 45 kilometres (28 mi) northwest of Cagliari and about 7 kilometres (4 mi) northeast of Sanluri. It has 2,392 inhabitants.

Villamar borders the municipalities of Furtei, Guasila, Las Plassas, Lunamatrona, Pauli Arbarei, Sanluri, Segariu, and Villanovafranca.

== Demographics ==
As of 2026, the population is 2,392, of which 50.4% are male, and 49.6% are female. Minors make up 12.3% of the population, and seniors make up 28.3%.

Historical population

Year	Pop.	±%
1861	1,948	—
1871	1,825	−6.3%
1881	1,903	+4.3%
1901	2,047	+7.6%
1911	2,250	+9.9%
1921	2,220	−1.3%
1931	2,675	+20.5%
1936	2,876	+7.5%

Year	Pop.	±%
1951	3,301	+14.8%
1961	3,369	+2.1%
1971	3,057	−9.3%
1981	3,196	+4.5%
1991	3,147	−1.5%
2001	2,960	−5.9%
2011	2,872	−3.0%
2021	2,472	−13.9%

Source: ISTAT

=== Immigration ===
As of 2025, immigrants make up 3.2% of the population. The 5 largest foreign countries of birth are Romania, Switzerland, Belgium, Morocco, and Germany.
