= Sanluri =

Sanluri Seddori (Sardinian)
- Comune
- Comune di Sanluri
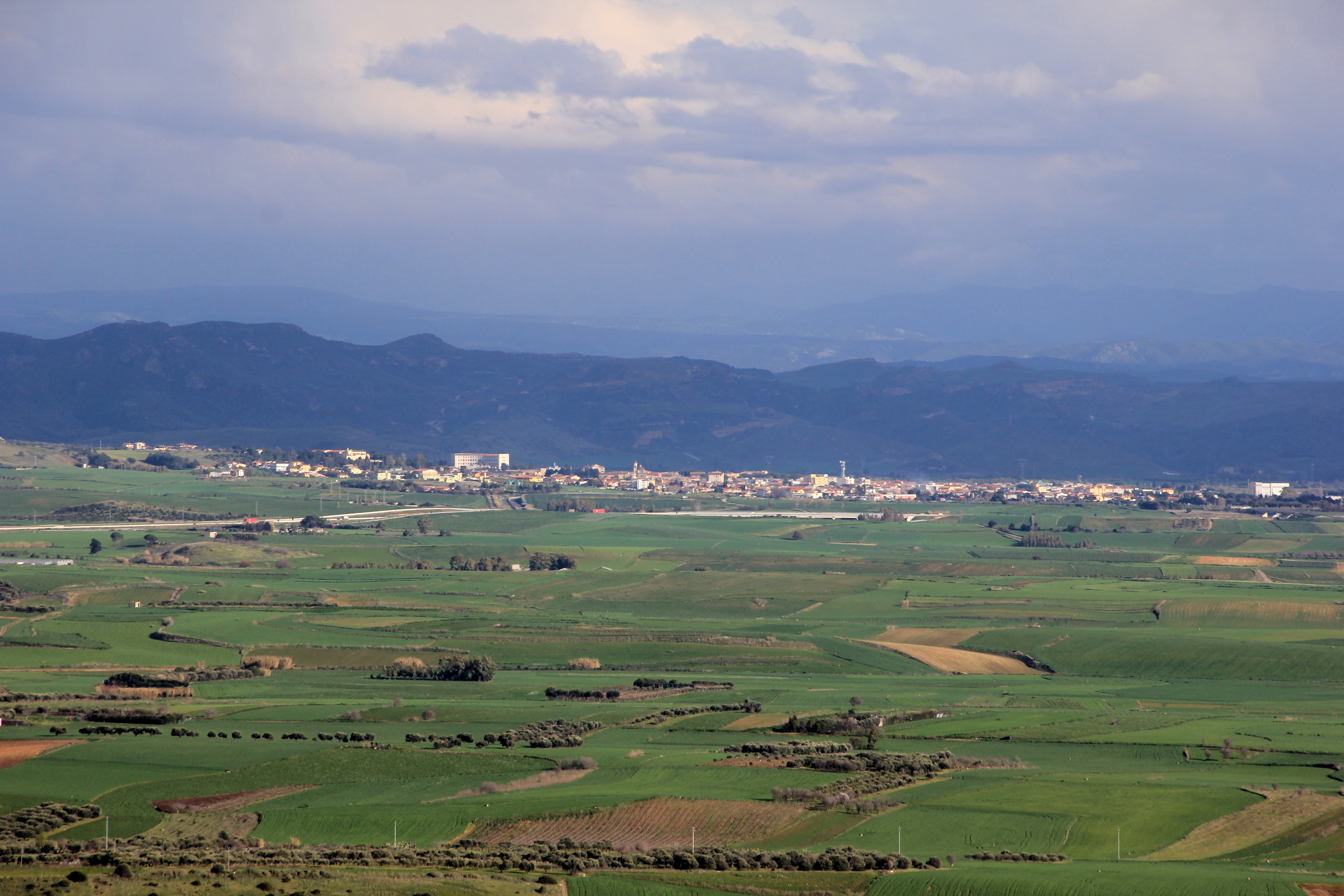
- View of Sanluri

- Location within Sardinia
- Coordinates: 39°34′N 8°54′E
- Country: Italy
- Region: Sardinia
- Province: Medio Campidano
- Frazioni: Sanluri Stato, San Michele

Government
  - Mayor: Alberto Urpi

Area
  - Total: 84.23 km^{2} (32.52 sq mi)
- Elevation: 633 m (2,077 ft)

Population (2026)
  - Total: 7,996
  - Density: 94.93/km^{2} (245.9/sq mi)
- Demonym: Sanluresi
- Time zone: UTC+1 (CET)
  - Summer (DST): UTC+2 (CEST)
- Postal code: 09025
- Dialing code: 070
- Patron saint: Nostra Signora delle Grazie
- Saint day: May 31
- Website: Official website

Sanluri (Italian: [sanˈluːri]; Sardinian: Seddori) is a town and comune (municipality), which along with Villacidro is a co-capital of the province of Medio Campidano in the autonomous island region of Sardinia in Italy. With a population of 7,996, it is the 4th-largest town in the province.

Sanluri borders the municipalities of Furtei, Lunamatrona, Samassi, San Gavino Monreale, Sardara, Serramanna, Serrenti, Villacidro, Villamar, and Villanovaforru.

== History ==
In 1436, Sanluri was elevated to viscountship by the Aragonese Crown, and granted to Giovanni de Sena, baron of Quartu Sant'Elena and viscount of Sanluri, the feudalism lasted until the 1800s.

== Demographics ==
As of 2026, the population is 7,996, of which 49.4% are male, and 50.6% are female. Minors make up 11.4% of the population, and seniors make up 27.6%.

Historical population

Year	Pop.	±%
1861	4,199	—
1871	4,177	−0.5%
1881	4,177	+0.0%
1901	4,403	+5.4%
1911	4,593	+4.3%
1921	4,786	+4.2%
1931	5,449	+13.9%
1936	5,721	+5.0%

Year	Pop.	±%
1951	7,555	+32.1%
1961	7,595	+0.5%
1971	7,402	−2.5%
1981	8,305	+12.2%
1991	8,499	+2.3%
2001	8,519	+0.2%
2011	8,460	−0.7%
2021	8,170	−3.4%

Source: ISTAT

=== Climate ===
According to the Köppen climate classification, Sanluri experiences a hot-summer Mediterranean climate (Csa).

=== Immigration ===
As of 2025, immigrants make up 4.3% of the population. The 5 largest foreign countries of birth are Switzerland, Romania, Morocco, Pakistan, and Germany.

== See also ==
- Battle of Sanluri, 1409.
