= Nuraghe Fenu =

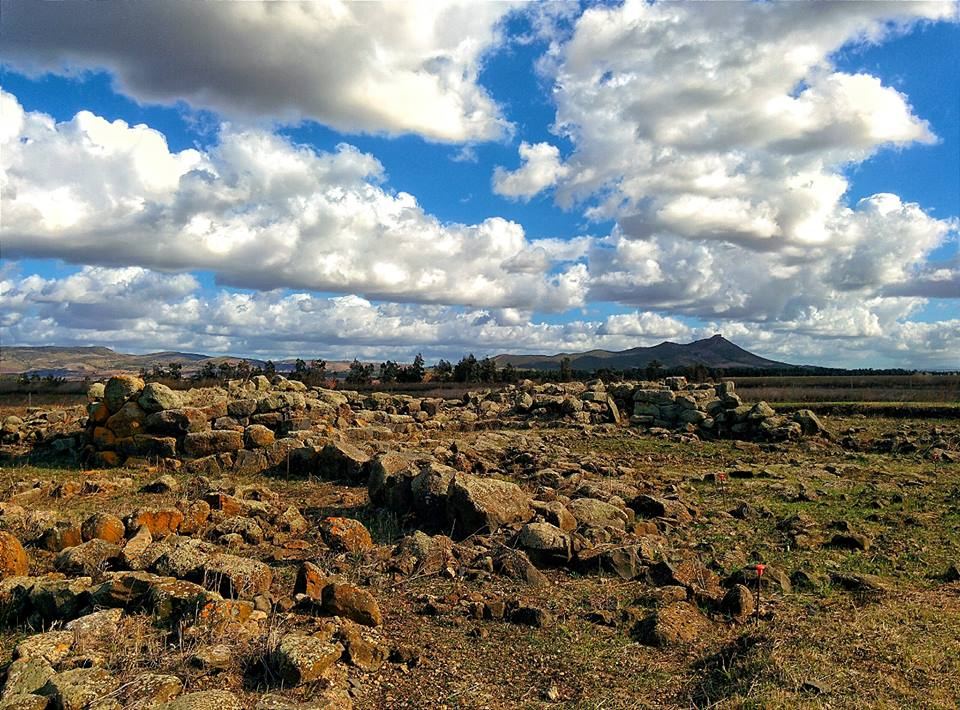

- Location within Italy
- 39.605805°N 8.744962°E
- Type: Nuraghe
- Cultures: Nuragic civilization
- Location: Pabillonis, Sardinia, Italy
- Region: Sardinia

History
- Built: 1300 BC

Site notes
- Public access: free entry

Nuraghe Fenu is a nuraghe located in the municipality of Pabillonis in Sardinia. It was constructed in the mid-Bronze Age (1300–1150 BC) and it covers an area of 2000 m^{2}. Vittorio Angius, a 19th-century historian, described it as one of the biggest nuraghi of Sardinia, akin to nuraghe Saurecci and nuraghe S'Orku.

== Description ==
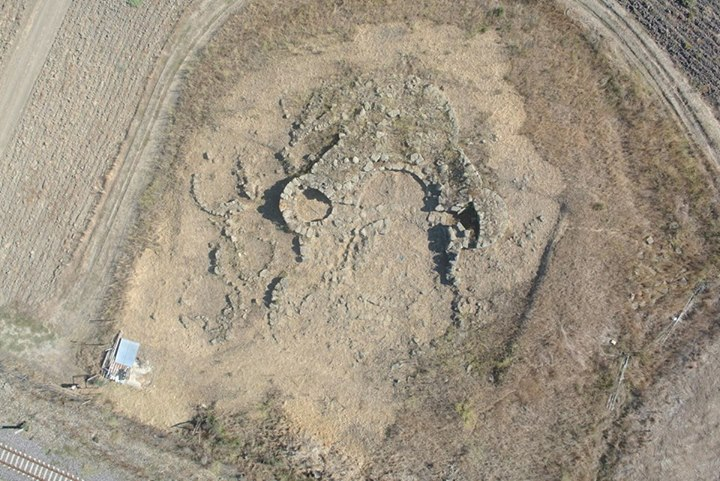
Aerial view of Nuraghe Fenu

Nuraghe Fenu is composed of basaltic rocks and it has a multi-lobed structure with only three towers remaining and a height of 1.70 metres (5 ft 7 in). In the north, the fortified tower has a wall that is 2 metres (6 ft 7 in) tall. It is near the train station of Pabillonis in the countryside. In the 19th century, it was used to build a railway bridge and houses near Pabillonis.

== Excavations ==
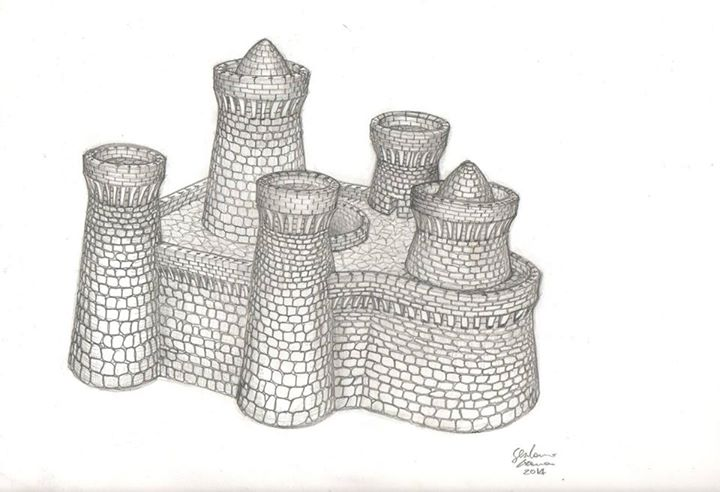
Graphic reconstruction of Nuraghe Fenu

Excavations started in 1996, allowing archaeologists to study the stratigraphy of the ground. The rest of the nuraghe was re-used by Punic and Roman civilization. The five towers of the nuraghe were completely excavated, as was the residential area near tower E. The excavation uncovered fragments of ceramic, oil lamps, and coins of Roman age. They are in the museum of Sardara.

== Gallery ==
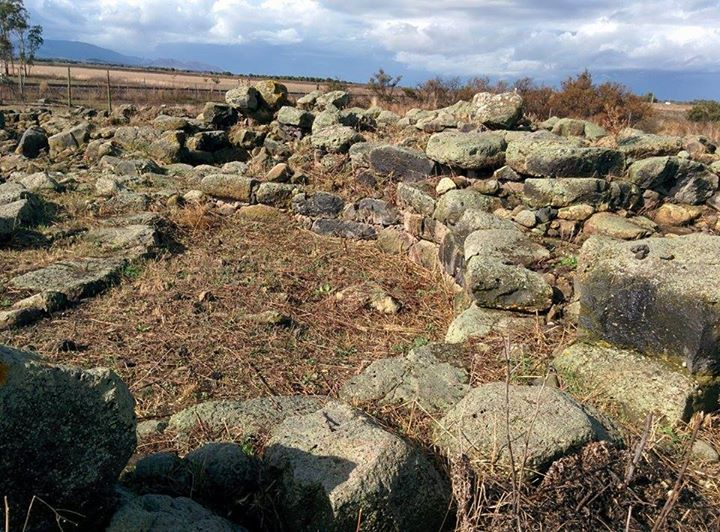

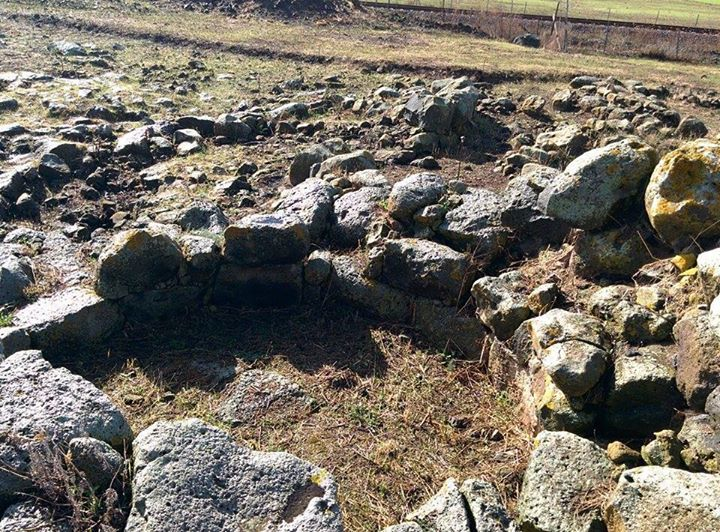

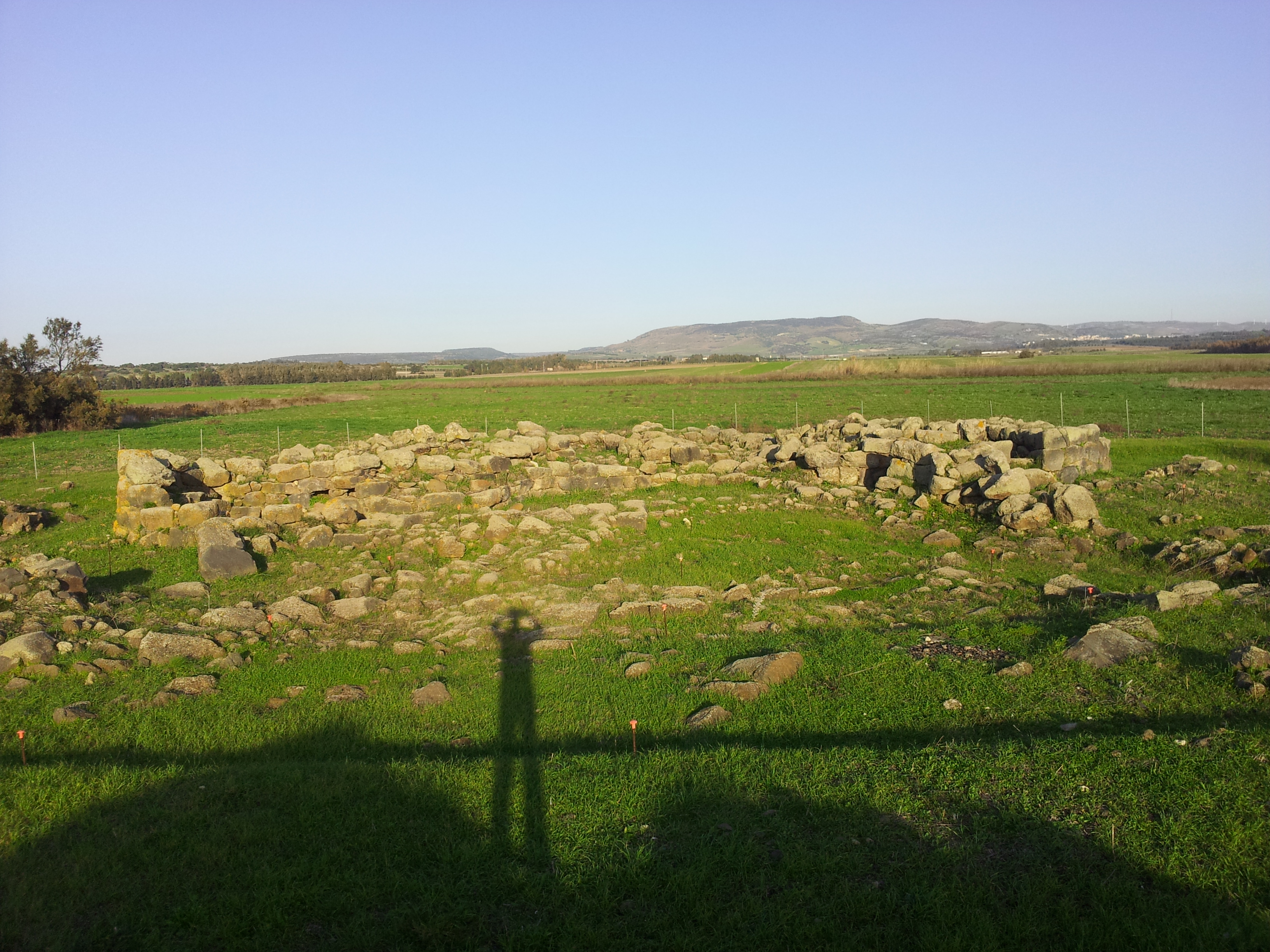

== Bibliography ==
- Vittorio Angius, Città e villaggi della Sardegna dell'Ottocento.Pabillonis-Zuri, Ilisso Editori, 2006.
