= Francesco Sanna (politician, born 1979) =

Italian politician (born 1979)

President of the Province of Medio Campidano
- Incumbent
- Assumed office 20 October 2026
- Preceded by: Giuseppe De Fanti

Mayor of Collinas
- Incumbent
- Assumed office 10 June 2018
- Preceded by: Francesco Paolo Cannas

Personal details
- Born: 14 November 1979 (age 46) San Gavino Monreale, Sardinia, Italy

Francesco Sanna (born 14 November 1979) is an Italian politician serving as president of the Province of Medio Campidano since October 2026. He also served as mayor of Collinas since 2018.

== Life and career ==
Sanna was born in San Gavino Monreale, Sardinia, in 1979. He completed secondary education and worked as a self-employed professional in the excise-tax sector and in real estate management.

He was first elected to the municipal council of Collinas in 2003. From 2008 to 2018, he served as deputy mayor and municipal assessor. In April 2017, he was elected president of the Sa Corona Arrubia tourism consortium. In the 2018 local election, he was elected mayor as the candidate of the civic list "Crescere Insieme", receiving 446 votes (80.79%). He was re-elected mayor in 2023.

In July 2026, Sanna was selected as the centre-left coalition's candidate for president of the Province of Medio Campidano, with his candidacy formally endorsed in early August. The election was initially scheduled for 26 August 2026. On 19 August, the Regional Administrative Court of Sardinia suspended the election pending a legal challenge brought by Carlo Pahler, a municipal councillor from Serramanna. In September, the court declared the appeal inadmissible for lack of standing and the election was subsequently rescheduled. Sanna was elected president on 19 October, receiving 50,127 weighted votes (55%) against 41,011 (45%) for Emanuele Lilliu, mayor of Barumini.
