= Nuraghe Santu Sciori =

Nuraghe in Pabillonis, Sardinia, Italy

- Nuraghe Santu Luxori
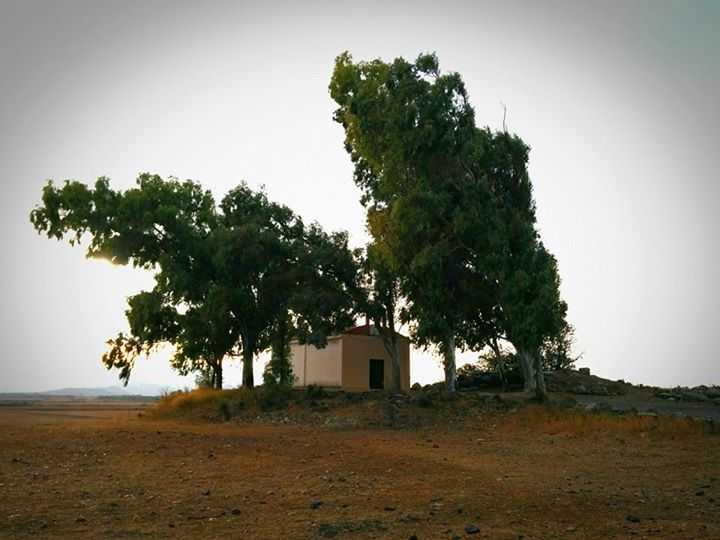

- Location within Italy
- 39°37′55.7″N 8°42′41.32″E
- Type: Nuraghe
- Cultures: Nuragic civilization
- Location: Pabillonis, Sardinia, Italy
- Region: Sardinia

History
- Built: 1300 BC

Site notes
- Management: Soprintendenza per i Beni Archeologici per le province di Cagliari e Oristano
- Public access: Yes, free entrance

The nuraghe Santu Sciori (also known as Santu Luxori in the Sardinian language or San Lussorio in Italian) is a nuraghe located in the municipality of Pabillonis in Sardinia.

It was made in the mid-Bronze Age (1600–1300 BC) and it covers an area of 2,400 square meters. Remains of skeletons have been found near the site indicating a necropolis. 19th-century historian Vittorio Angius described it as important among the big nuraghes of Sardinia.

== Description ==
The nuraghe was made entirely from basaltic rocks, having a complex structure with a polylobate bastion and towers underground. Above it there is a church erected in 1970 in honor of St. Lussorio. Near there is another ancient church below which there is another small nuraghe.

== Gallery ==
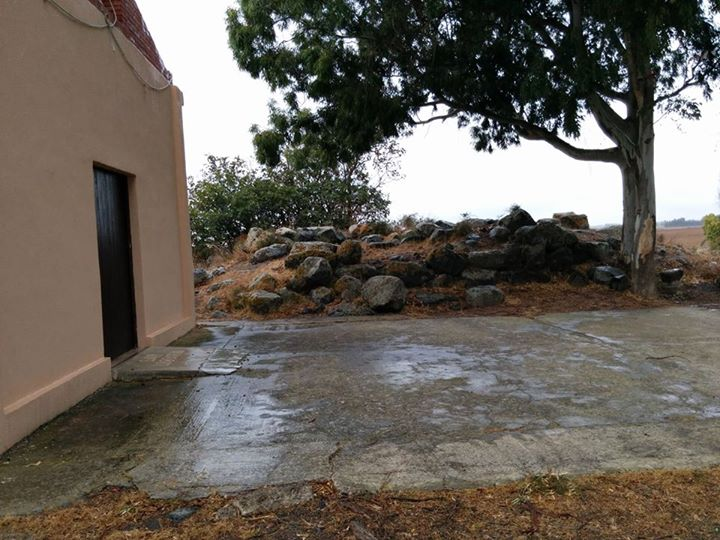

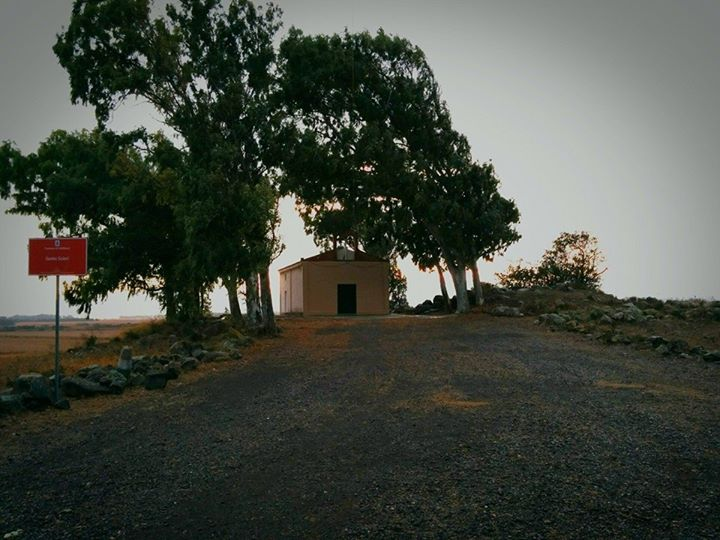

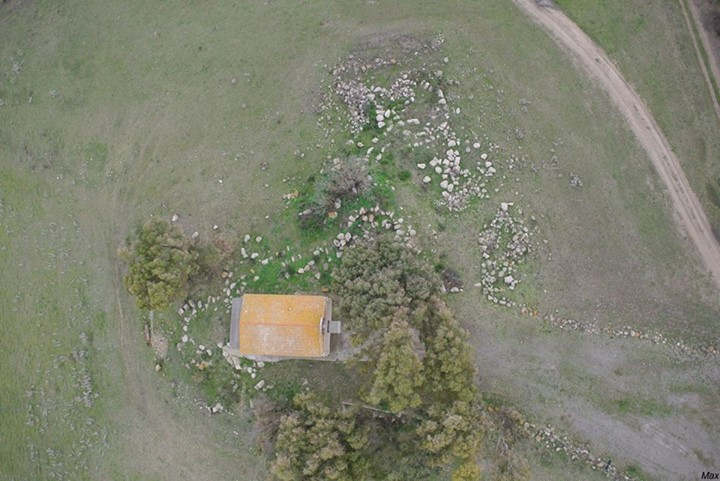

== Bibliography ==
- Vittorio Angius, Città e villaggi della Sardegna dell' Ottocento, Illisso Editori, 2006
