= Giuseppe De Fanti =

Italian politician (born 1958)

President of the Province of Medio Campidano
- In office 30 September 2025 – 10 June 2026
- Preceded by: Office re-established
- Succeeded by: Francesco Sanna

Mayor of Guspini
- In office 1 June 2015 – 7 June 2026
- Preceded by: Rossella Pinna
- Succeeded by: Marco Pala

Personal details
- Born: 5 October 1958 (age 68) Guspini, Sardinia, Italy
- Party: The Daisy; Democratic Party
- Education: University of Cagliari
- Occupation: Engineer, teacher

Giuseppe De Fanti (born 5 October 1958) is an Italian politician, engineer and teacher of the Democratic Party. He served as president of the Province of Medio Campidano from 2025 to 2026 and as mayor of Guspini from 2015 to 2026.

== Life and career ==
De Fanti was born in Guspini, Sardinia, in 1958. He graduated from the University of Cagliari and qualified as an engineer, enrolling in the professional register in 1984. He worked as a secondary-school mathematics teacher from 1987, eventually teaching at the Vignarelli Institute in Sanluri.

De Fanti entered local politics in Guspini in 1995, serving as a municipal councillor and as assessor for urban planning and public works. From 2000 he also served as deputy mayor. In 2005, he was elected to the first Provincial Council of Medio Campidano on The Daisy list and was appointed assessor for the environment in the administration of president Fulvio Tocco. He was re-elected in 2010 as a member of the Democratic Party and was again appointed to the provincial executive.

In June 2015, he was elected mayor of Guspini with 58.24% of the vote and re-elected in 2020.

In September 2025, De Fanti was elected president of the Province of Medio Campidano in the province's first election following its re-establishment. He ran with the centre-left coalition against Italo Carrucciu, mayor of Lunamatrona, who was supported by the centre-right, receiving 52,650 weighted votes (58.74%). De Fanti's term as provincial president ended in June 2026 following his loss of the office of mayor of Guspini.
