= Gonnosfanadiga =

Gonnosfanadiga Gonnos (Sardinian)
- Comune
- Comune di Gonnosfanadiga
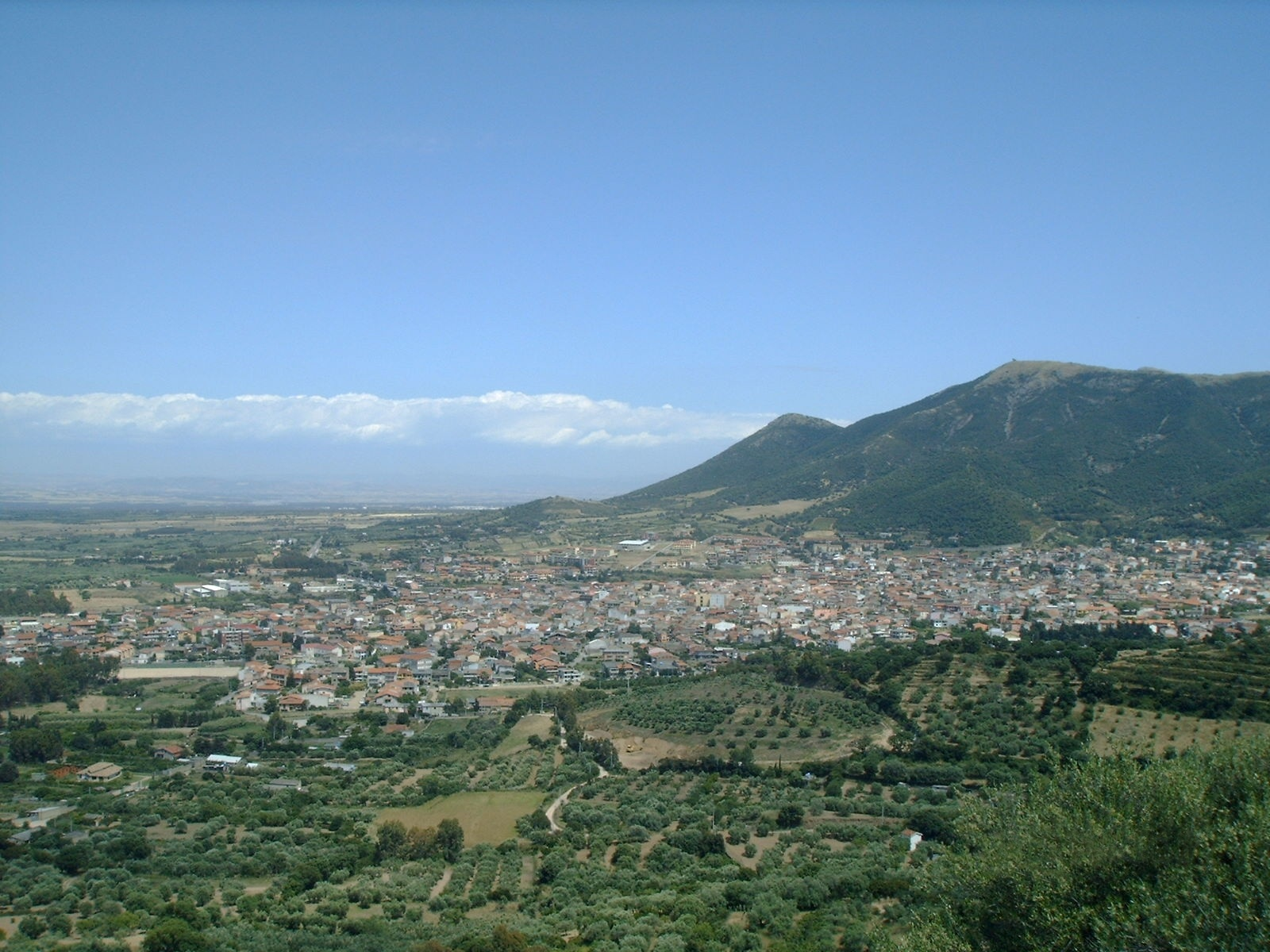
- View of Gonnosfanadiga

- Coat of arms

- Location within Sardinia
- Coordinates: 39°30′N 08°40′E
- Country: Italy
- Region: Sardinia
- Province: Medio Campidano
- Frazioni: Pardu Atzei

Government
  - Mayor: Fausto orrù

Area
  - Total: 125.19 km^{2} (48.34 sq mi)
- Elevation: 185 m (607 ft)

Population (2026)
  - Total: 5,959
  - Density: 47.60/km^{2} (123.3/sq mi)
- Demonym: Gonnesi
- Time zone: UTC+1 (CET)
  - Summer (DST): UTC+2 (CEST)
- Postal code: 09035
- Dialing code: 070
- Patron saint: Santa Barbara
- Saint day: December 4
- Website: Official website

Gonnosfanadiga (Sardinian: Gonnos) is a town and comune (municipality) in the province of Medio Campidano in the autonomous island region of Sardinia in Italy. It is located between Medio Campidano plain to the northeast and the Monte Linas massif to the southwest. It has 5,959 inhabitants.

The economy is mostly based on agriculture (olives, olive oil, bread, sweets, pig meat) and animal husbandry. The territory is home to two giants' graves.

== History ==
The area results to be inhabited since prehistoric times, studies date back to the early Neolithic attend certain, that occurred between the sixth and fourth millennium BC in the territory of the Terr'e Seddari, but can not be ruled earlier settlements resulting from the good position and wealth of resources. There are also relevant evidence that include remains of the nuragic period, Nuraghes and giants' graves, one of which, that of S. Cosimo (brought to light by excavations in the early 1980s), is among the largest in Sardinia.

There is no certain claims of the Phoenician, but the area is both close to the sea, from which came the skilled sailors in the Middle East, both at Nabui (S. Maria Neapolis in the territory of Guspini) where they founded a colony, and other areas frequented by the Phoenicians certainly like Antas in the territory of Fluminimaggiore.

About two centuries before Christ, the Romans arrived in Sardinia and also the territory of Gonnosfanadiga is rich in witnesses ranging from numerous finds of coins, ornaments and weapons, to the identification of the remains of fortifications, encampments, graves and four cemeteries

Around the sixth century AD, coinciding with the arrival of the Byzantine in the island, began the work of evangelization of the Greek monks, as evidenced by the names of many places, and the remains of numerous places of worship, some of them almost totally disappeared, and one of which remains a fine example: the rural church of S. Severa.

In medieval times is demonstrated the existence of various villages in the territory of Gonnosfanadiga: Bidda Atzei (or Zei), Gonnos Fanadiga, Gonnos de Montangia, Aqua de Gonnos, as centers that paid tithes to the Church in the years between 1341 and 1359. The list is not complete, however, being still inhabited at that time the center of Serru. Gonnosfanadiga, or rather its territory, was part of the Judges of Arborea, including in the administrative area of Bonorzuli and in the district of the diocese of Terralba.

About the birth of today's town the news is a little uncertain. Certainly in the modern era it exists with this name as a municipality. Under Spanish rule in Sardinia (1479-1650 approximately) there are documents that describe the life of the country, which in this period belonged to the Marquis of Quirra.

== Geography ==
Its territory extends in similar proportions between the plain of Medio Campidano to the northeast, the hills around the town and the massif of Monte Linas to the southwest. It also includes a village in the territory of Guspini: Pardu Atzei (Sardinian: [aˈtse.i]).

The plain type is volcanic-alluvial wetlands in the winter season, while the hills and mountains, rich in mineral deposits, have a variable composition with a predominance of granite, schist, and generally with a high rate of rock and limited depth of active layer; the highest point is Punta de sa Perda Mesa at 1,236 metres (4,055 ft).

The town is situated on the slopes of the mountains and is crossed by the Rio Piras, river with torrential character.

Gonnosfanadiga borders the municipalities of Arbus, Guspini, Pabillonis, San Gavino Monreale, Villacidro, Domusnovas, and Fluminimaggiore.

== Demographics ==
Historical population
Year	Pop.	±%
1861	3,573	—
1871	3,863	+8.1%
1881	4,091	+5.9%
1901	4,485	+9.6%
1911	5,176	+15.4%
1921	5,337	+3.1%
1931	5,480	+2.7%
1936	5,822	+6.2%
1951	7,259	+24.7%
1961	7,211	−0.7%
1971	7,079	−1.8%
1981	7,322	+3.4%
1991	7,320	−0.0%
2001	6,970	−4.8%
2011	6,702	−3.8%
2021	6,243	−6.8%
Source: ISTAT

As of 2026, the population is 5,959, of which 48.9% are male, and 51.1% are female. Minors make up 11.6% of the population, and seniors make up 29.1%.

=== Immigration ===
As of 2025, immigrants make up 1.9% of the population. The 5 largest foreign countries of birth are Romania, Germany, Morocco, France, and Kyrgyzstan.

== Sights ==
=== Civil architecture ===
==== Gradinata (flight of steps) ====
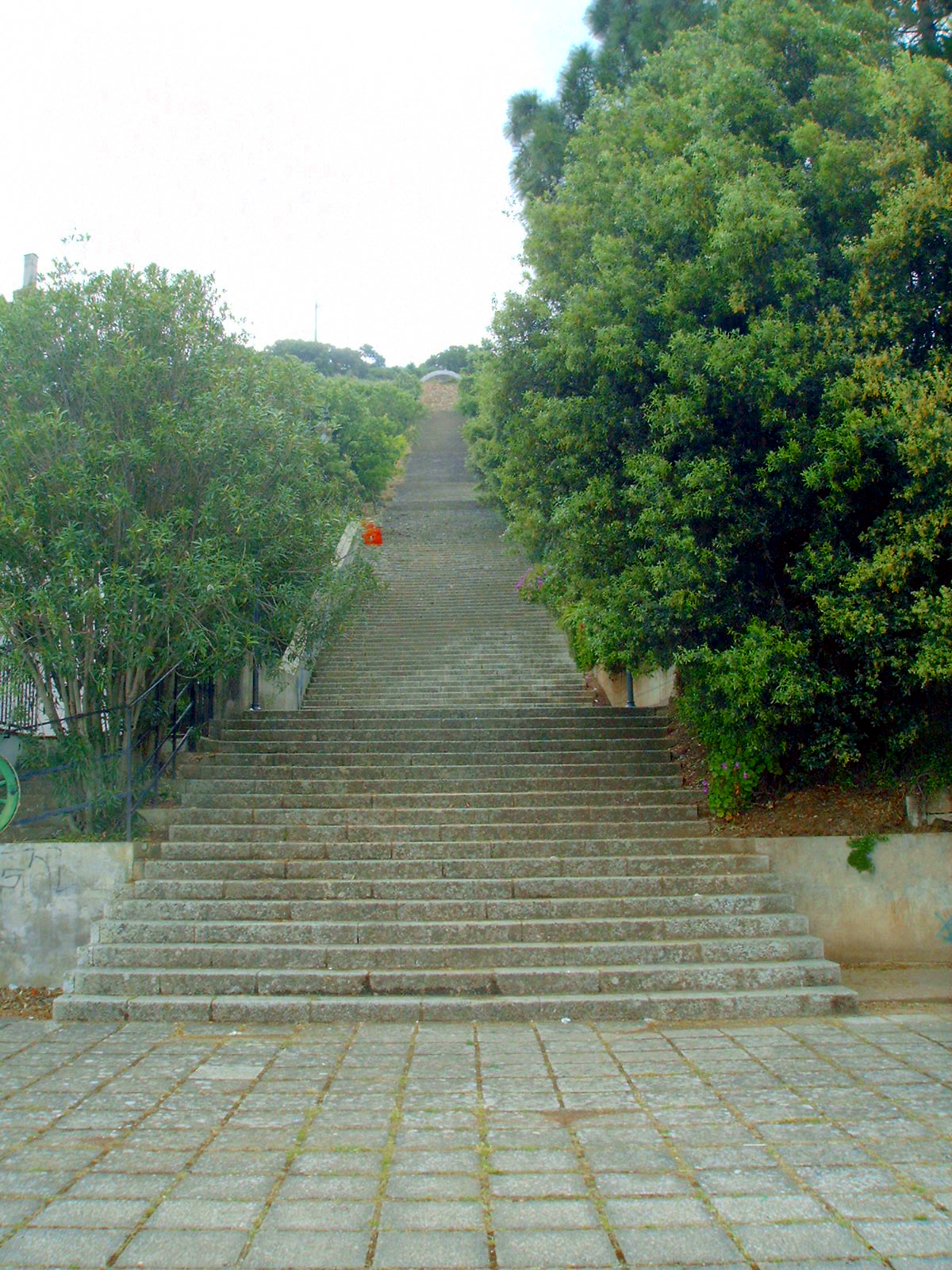
The gradinata (flight of steps) of Gonnosfanadiga.

=== Archaeological sites ===
==== Giants grave of San Cosimo ====
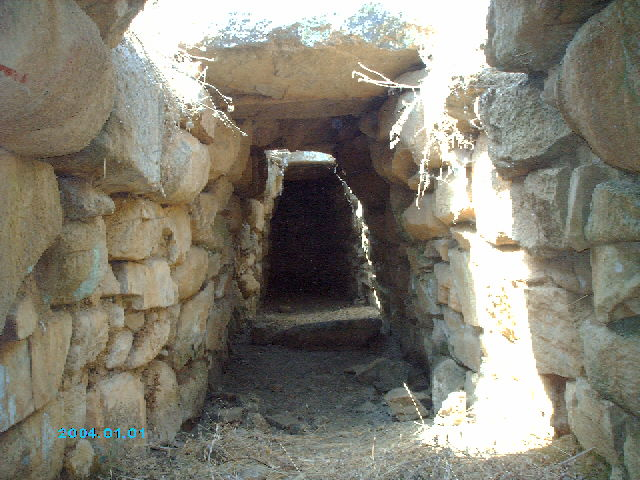
Inside of the tomb of the giants of San Cosimo.

The tomb of St. Cosimo I, located in San Cosimo, is also known as Sa Grutta de Santu Giuanni. The megalithic construction is dated around 1500 BC. The facade is semicircular exedra of 26 metres (85 ft), which is the entrance to the burial chamber, which reaches about 20 metres (66 ft), making it one of the largest in Sardinia. The area on which it stands the tomb is strongly characterized by the remains of nuragical settlements.

During the archaeological excavations, carried out in 1981, were found numerous items including handmade pottery (bowls and jars) and, unique in the archaeological of Sardinia, a necklace made of glass paste and glass. Has also been documented frequentation in Roman times. The site is easily accessible from the main road that leads from Gonnosfanadiga to Arbus.

=== Religious architecture ===
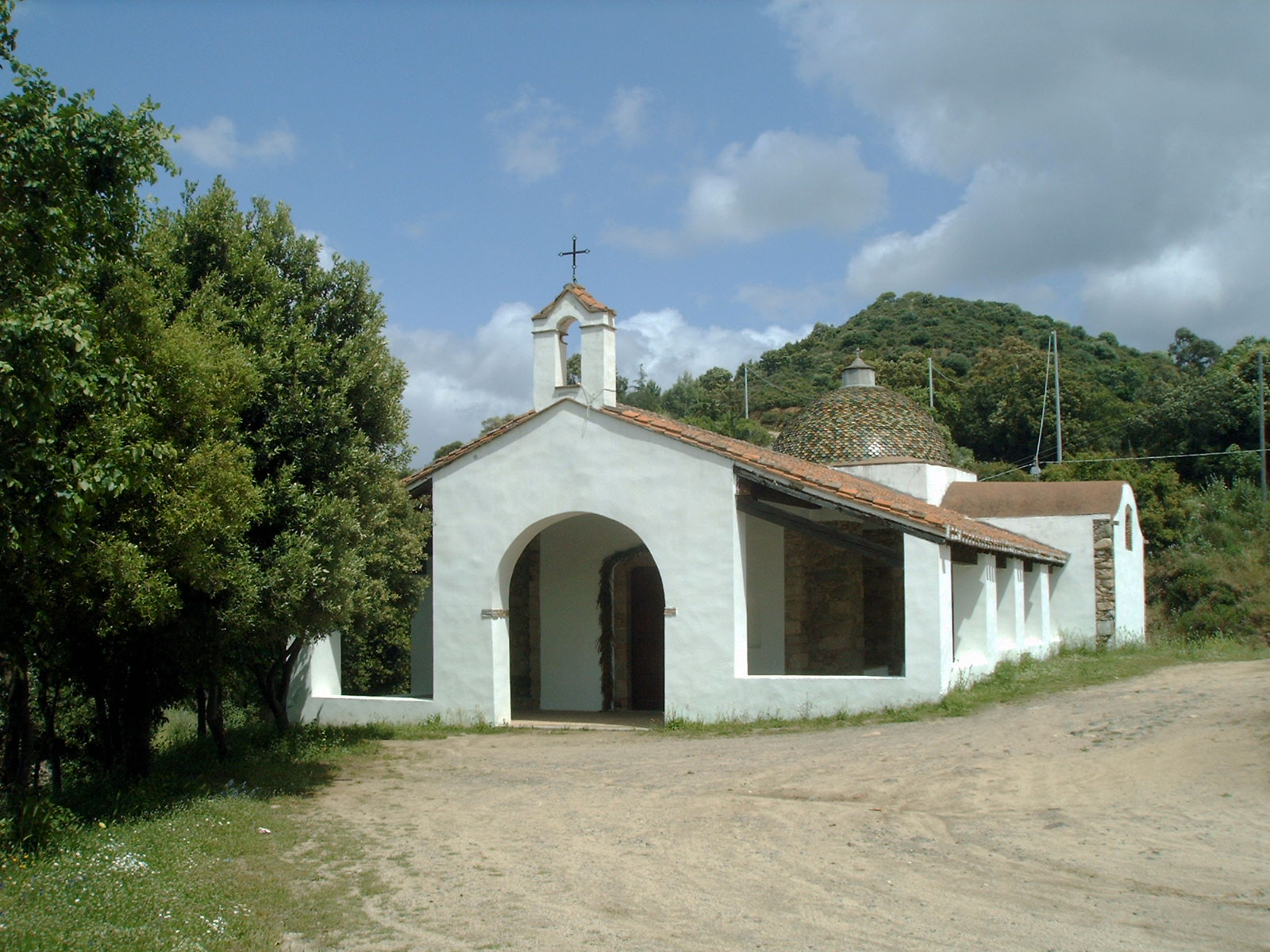
Church of santa Severa.

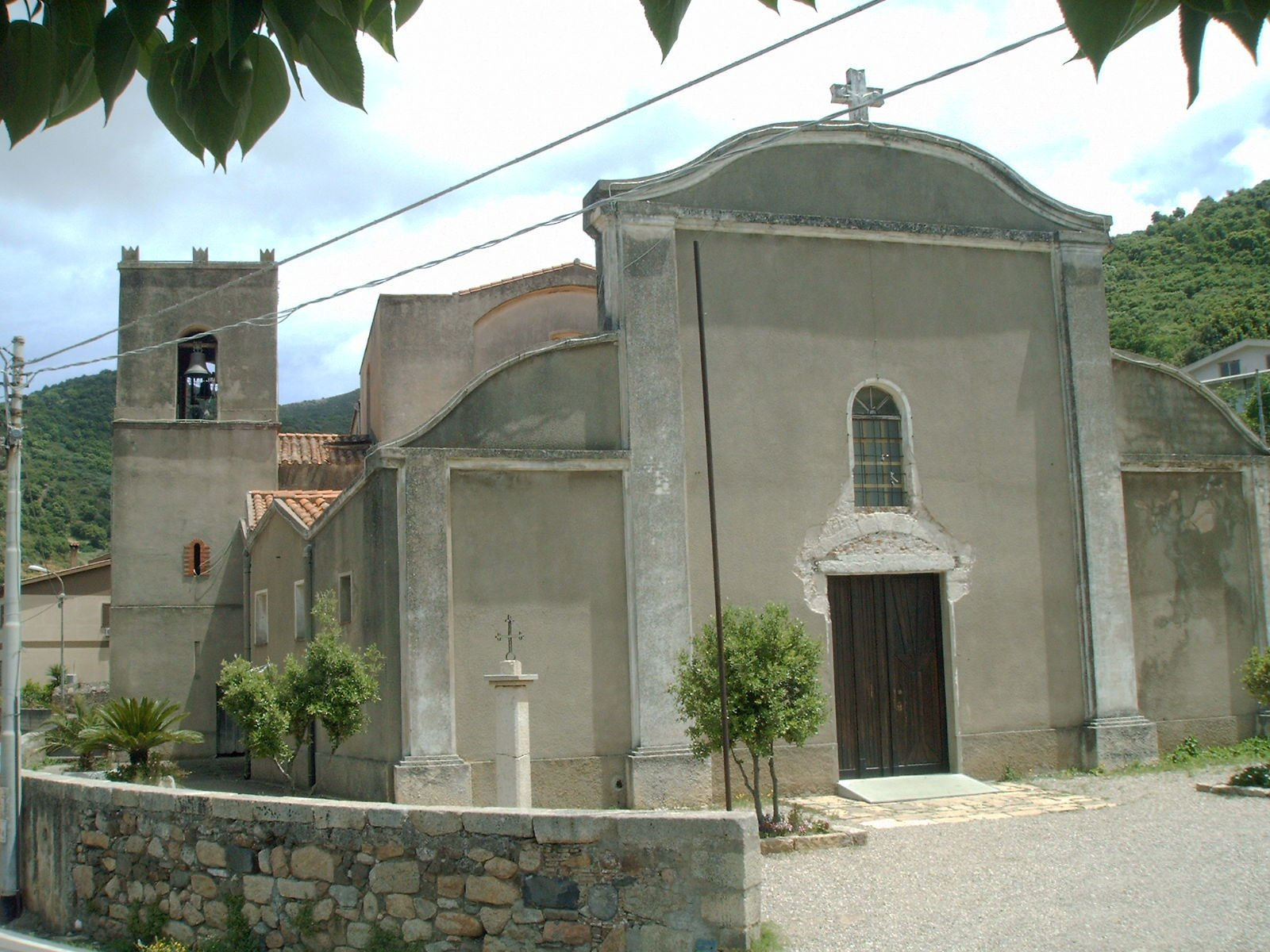
Church of santa Barbara.

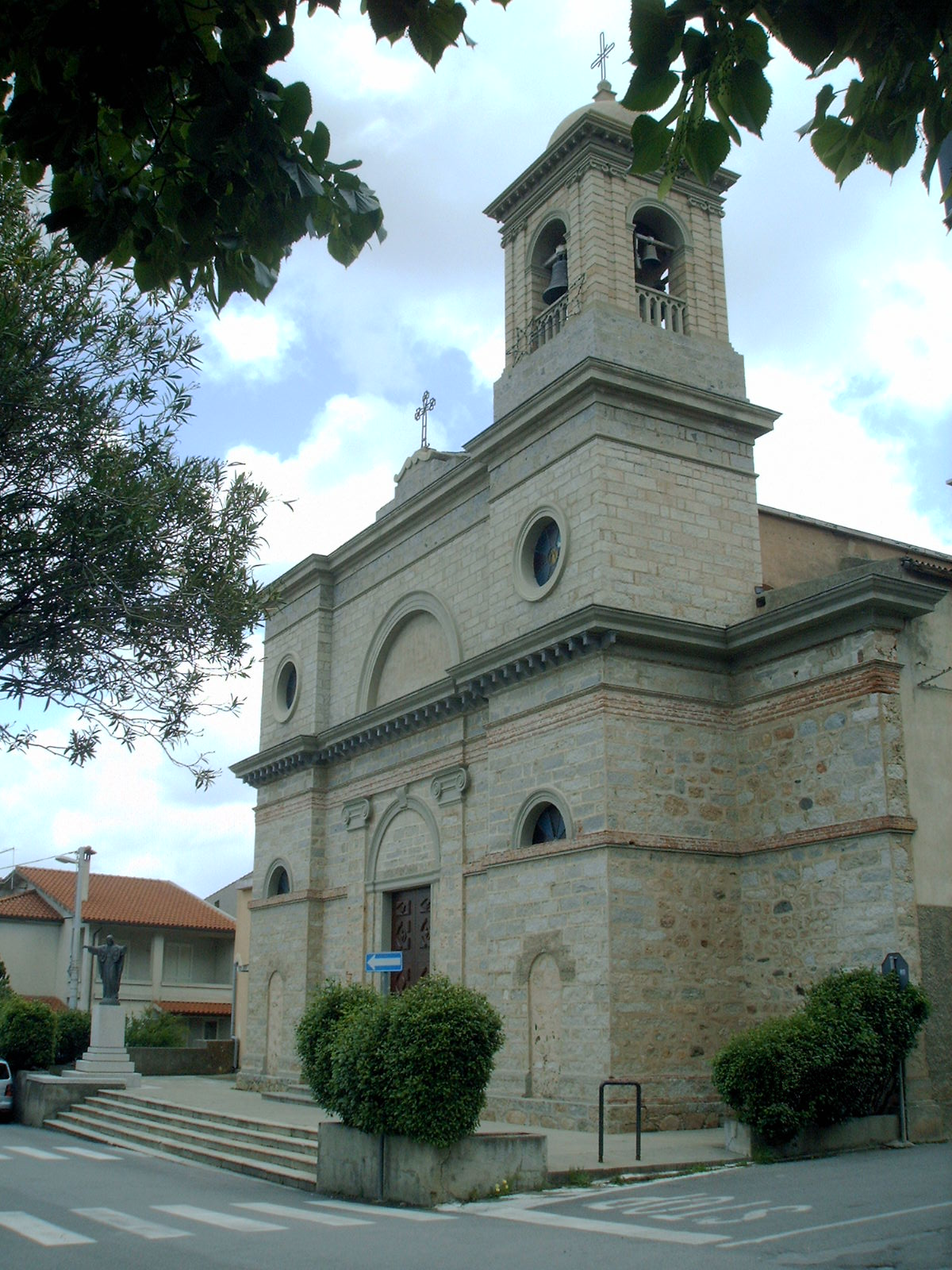
Church of sacro cuore.

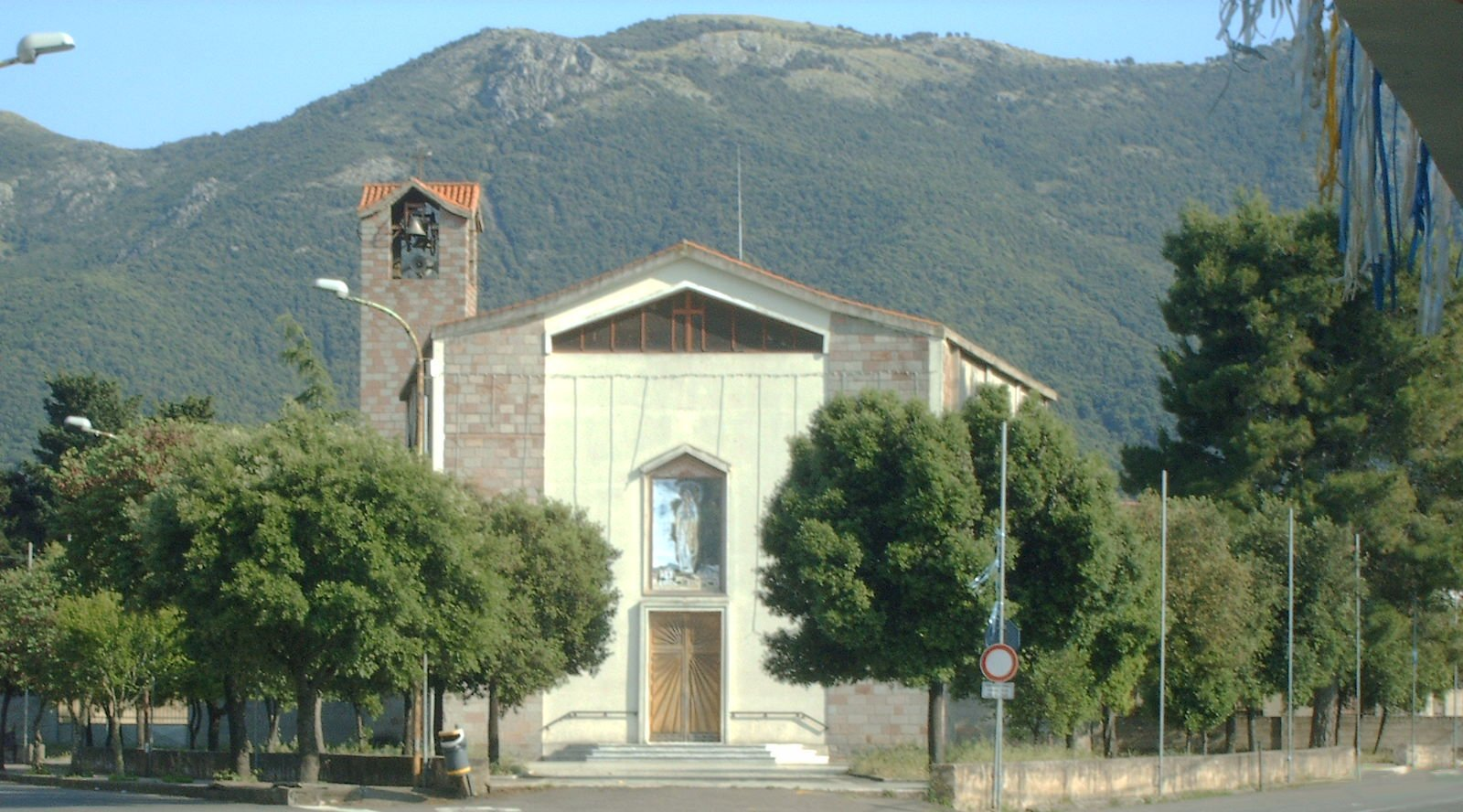
Church of beata vergine di Lourdes.

- Church of s. Barbara
- Church of sacro cuore (sacred heart)
- Church of b.v.di Lourdes

==== Church of s. Severa ====
Situated on a hill a few hundred meters from the town, dating back to the early Christian period (fourth-fifth century). It stands on the site of an ancient Roman necropolis, it is therefore likely that the devotion to this saint goes back to those early inhabitants of the place. It has undergone successive restorations since 1797.

The monument is a building with a Latin cross plan, with vaulted into fights arches. The nave, 10 by 4.2 metres (33 by 14 ft), is divided into three mirrors by two pilasters on which are set the arches of the vault, but originally times were extrados with double curve, as can be seen by looking at the side prospectuses and the back. The roof is wooden beams.

To the right and left of the main door are the hinges that held the barriers. Later the Greek monks built the vault. The square space born from the arms of the cross that is delimited arches on which rests a semi-spherical dome of tiles at scales of 4 metres (13 ft) in circumference

==== Disappeared church ====
The church of s. Antonio Abate stood in the medieval village of Gonnos de Montanya, and was the first parochial in the country. It stood on the area of the church of s. Barbara, who replaced her in the role of the parish.

The original structure was a single nave with side chapels preserved today only with a ribbed cross vault on corbels.

In the area of Serru are still the ruins of the parish church dedicated to s. Peter, 8 metres (26 ft) long.

There is also another church called s. Lorenzo: its dimensions are 4.10 by 10.45 metres (13.5 by 34.3 ft) over the apse, which has a length of 2.40 metres (7.9 ft) oriented east. Inside the apse are ashlars, and some side walls have undergone modification.

The church of s. Elijah very old, and already decaying in the 700, was active until 1903, collapsed on 13 April 1908.

In the area there were also other churches: s. Mary of Montserrat, s. Maria Itria, s. Elena, demolished in 1761 by order of General Pope, to prevent who took refuge evildoers. Other churches were those of s. John, s. Bartholomew, s. Luke, s. Anastasia, s. Simeon, s. Michele (of which the outer walls are still visible) and s. Domenico.

=== Natural areas ===
==== Park Perd'e Pibara ====
The park Perd'e Pibara is located south of Gonnosfanadiga, and for the most part is characterized by a thick and secular forest of oaks accompanied by a typical Mediterranean woodland: phyllirea, strawberry tree, rockrose, tree heath.

Other areas of the park are predominantly covered by rockrose, helichrysium, thyme and weaver's broom; particularly those further south where the pedo-morphological conditions are harsher. There is also a large area of mixed reforestation that includes: cork oak, broadleaf trees, pines and holm oaks.

It is also an ideal environment for the proliferation of several species of mushrooms that make it a popular destination for mycology enthusiasts.

The fauna is varied including numerous, boars, foxes, rabbits, goats, hedgehogs, weasels, different diurnal and nocturnal raptors, jays, partridges, small rodents, reptiles, and huge goldfish living in a large deep basin constantly fed by the abundance of spring water. Inside the park is also a placement of an abandoned molybdenite mine, an interesting example of industrial archeology.

=== Mining ===
At one time, probably from prehistoric times and until the 1970s, mining was one of the main occupations in this area. Industrial exploitation arrived in late 1800 and mid-1900, a technical and professional organization very advanced and very profitable for the entire community. Now the industry has been completely abandoned.

In the municipality of Gonnosfanadiga there are the following disused mines:

- Mine Fenugu Sibiri
- Mine Loss' and Pibera
- Mine S'Acqua Prunas - Genna S'Olioni
- Mine Salaponi

== Culture ==
=== Events ===
==== Feast of Olives ====
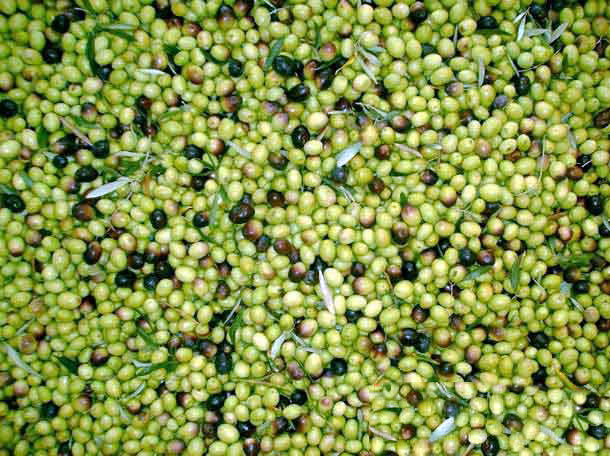
Olives of Gonnosfanadiga.

The festival of olives, agribusiness and local crafts is the appointment better prepared by the citizens of Gonnosfanadiga (that is also part of National association of oil cities) to showcase the most typical productions of the country. It takes place at the end of November, in the midst of olive oil year fell, and it involves big and small local producers, artisans and traders operating in the peasant sector.

Since the mid-1980s, it has become a regular tourist destination. It is now also an interesting event for people looking to learn more about history, tradition and nature, since the festival occurs alongside initiatives that aim to facilitate the understanding and emersion of heritage cultural and territory.

During the event you can attend both the production cycle of extra virgin olive oil to the mill as for exhibitions, environmental reconstructions and historical paths inherent Gonnosfanadiga and its activities.

== See also ==
- National association of oil cities
- National association of bread cities
- History of mining in Sardinia
