= List of presidents of the Province of Medio Campidano =

President of the Province of Medio Campidano
- Presidente della Provincia del Medio Campidano
- Incumbent; Francesco Sanna since 20 October 2026
- Term length: 4 years
- Inaugural holder: Fulvio Tocco
- Formation: 2005

The president of the Province of Medio Campidano is the head of the provincial government in Medio Campidano, Sardinia, Italy. The president oversees the administration of the province, coordinates the activities of the municipalities, and represents the province in regional and national matters.

Since October 2026, the office has been held by Francesco Sanna of the centre-left coalition.

== History ==
The Province of Medio Campidano was established in 2001 as part of the reorganization of the provinces of Sardinia and became operational after the first provincial elections held in 2005. The first president was Fulvio Tocco of the Democratic Party of the Left. The president was elected directly by citizens every five years. The province was abolished in 2016 as part of the regional reorganization of Sardinian provinces.

In 2021, the Autonomous Region of Sardinia approved the re-establishment of the Province of Medio Campidano, which became operational on 1 June 2025 with the appointment of extraordinary commissioner Roberto Cadeddu. The first election of the president and provincial council of the new province was held on 29 September 2025, resulting in the election of Giuseppe De Fanti.

== List ==
No.	Portrait	Name	Term of office		Party
No.	Portrait	Name	Start	End	Party
1		Fulvio Tocco	9 May 2005	31 May 2010	Democrats of the Left; Democratic Party
1		Fulvio Tocco	31 May 2010	1 July 2013	Democrats of the Left; Democratic Party
–		Pasquale Onida (Special Commissioner)	1 July 2013	31 December 2014	—
–		Tiziana Ledda (Special Commissioner)	31 December 2014	20 April 2016	—
Office abolished (2016–2025)
–		Roberto Cadeddu (Extraordinary Administrator)	1 June 2025	30 September 2025	—
2		Giuseppe De Fanti	30 September 2025	10 June 2026	Democratic Party
–		Maura Boi (Acting Vice-president)	10 June 2026	20 October 2026	Progressive Party
3		Francesco Sanna	20 October 2026	Incumbent	Independent (centre-left)

== Sources ==
- "Storia amministrativa dell'ente". Ministero dell'Interno.
