= Fluminimaggiore =

Fluminimaggiore Frùmini Majori (Sardinian)
- Comune
- Comune di Fluminimaggiore
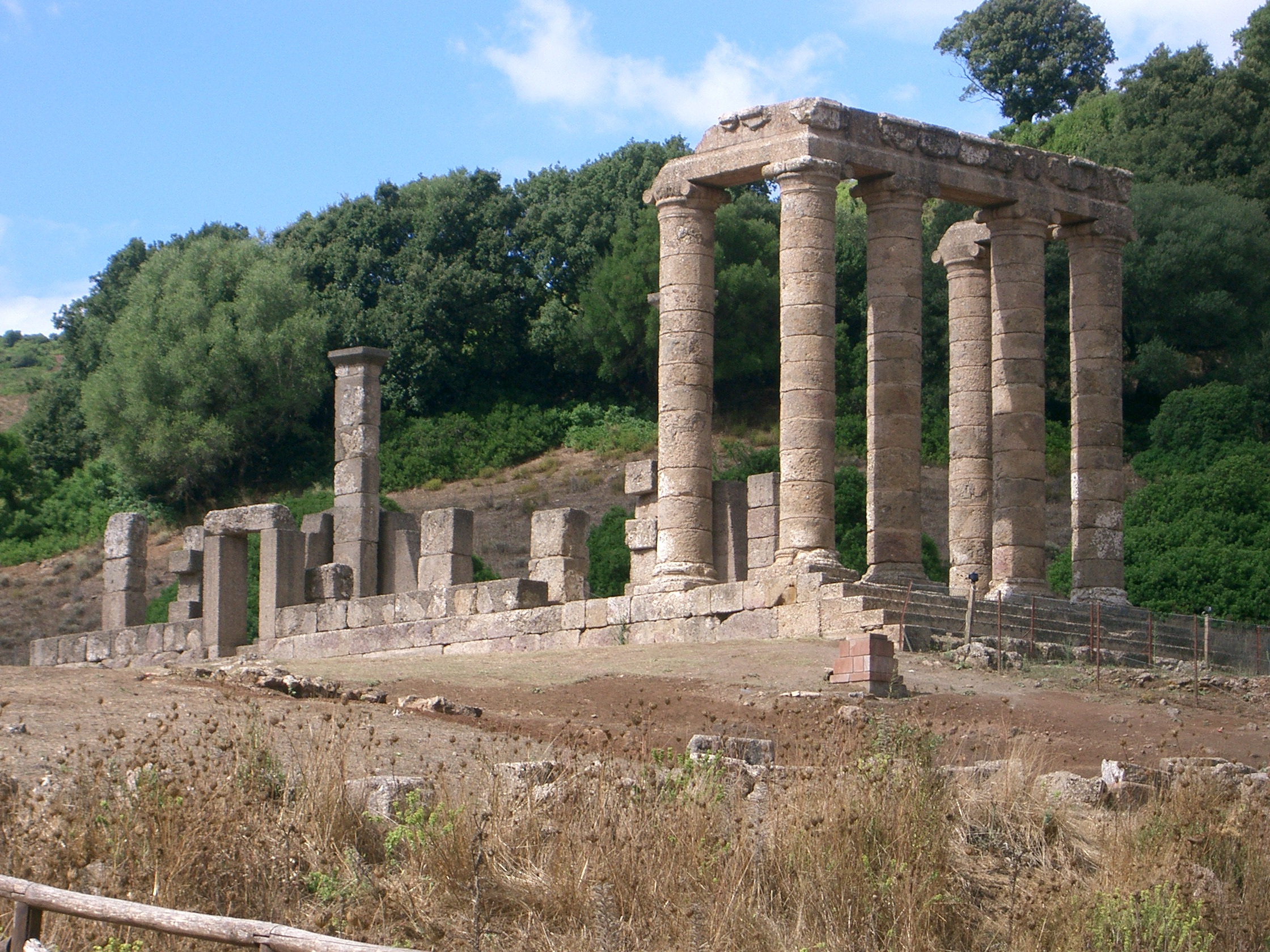
- Antas Temple

- Coat of arms

- Location within Sardinia
- Coordinates: 39°26′N 8°30′E
- Country: Italy
- Region: Sardinia
- Province: Sulcis Iglesiente
- Frazioni: Portixeddu, Sant'Angelo

Government
  - Mayor: Piergiuseppe Massa

Area
  - Total: 108.18 km^{2} (41.77 sq mi)
- Elevation: 63 m (207 ft)

Population (2026)
  - Total: 2,575
  - Density: 23.80/km^{2} (61.65/sq mi)
- Time zone: UTC+1 (CET)
  - Summer (DST): UTC+2 (CEST)
- Postal code: 09010
- Dialing code: 0781

Fluminimaggiore (Sardinian: Frùmini Majori) is a town and comune (municipality) in the Province of Sulcis Iglesiente in the autonomous island region of Sardinia in Italy, located about 60 kilometres (37 miles) northwest of Cagliari and about 30 km (19 mi) north of Carbonia. It has 2,575 inhabitants.

Fluminimaggiore borders the municipalities of Arbus, Buggerru, Domusnovas, Gonnosfanadiga, and Iglesias.

The Temple of Antas is located in the Fluminimaggiore territory. There are several museums in the town, including a paleontology museum.

== Demographics ==
As of 2026, the population is 2,575, of which 49.1% are male, and 50.9% are female. Minors make up 9.6% of the population, and seniors make up 32.4%.

Historical population

Year	Pop.	±%
1861	1,869	—
1871	2,192	+17.3%
1881	2,797	+27.6%
1901	3,990	+42.7%
1911	4,229	+6.0%
1921	3,900	−7.8%
1931	3,821	−2.0%
1936	3,374	−11.7%

Year	Pop.	±%
1951	3,820	+13.2%
1961	4,067	+6.5%
1971	3,690	−9.3%
1981	3,357	−9.0%
1991	3,241	−3.5%
2001	3,134	−3.3%
2011	2,966	−5.4%
2021	2,681	−9.6%

Source: ISTAT

=== Immigration ===
As of 2025, immigrants make up 2.3% of the total population. The 5 largest foreign countries of birth are Romania, Germany, Kyrgyzstan, China, and France.
