= San Nicolò d'Arcidano =

San Nicolò d'Arcidano Arcidanu
- Comune
- Comune di San Nicolò d'Arcidano
- Coat of arms

- Location within Sardinia
- Coordinates: 39°41′N 8°39′E
- Country: Italy
- Region: Sardinia
- Province: Oristano (OR)

Government
  - Mayor: Emanuele Cera

Area
  - Total: 28.4 km^{2} (11.0 sq mi)

Population (2007)
  - Total: 2,912
  - Density: 103/km^{2} (266/sq mi)
- Demonym: Arcidanesi
- Time zone: UTC+1 (CET)
  - Summer (DST): UTC+2 (CEST)
- Postal code: 09097
- Dialing code: 0783

San Nicolò d'Arcidano (Sardinian: Arcidànu) is a comune (municipality) in the Province of Oristano in the Italian region Sardinia, located about 70 km (43 mi) northwest of Cagliari and about 25 km (16 mi) south of Oristano.

San Nicolò d'Arcidano borders the following municipalities: Guspini, Mogoro, Pabillonis, Terralba, Uras.
