= Villanovaforru =

Villanovaforru Biddanoa de Forru (Sardinian)
- Comune
- Comune di Villanovaforru
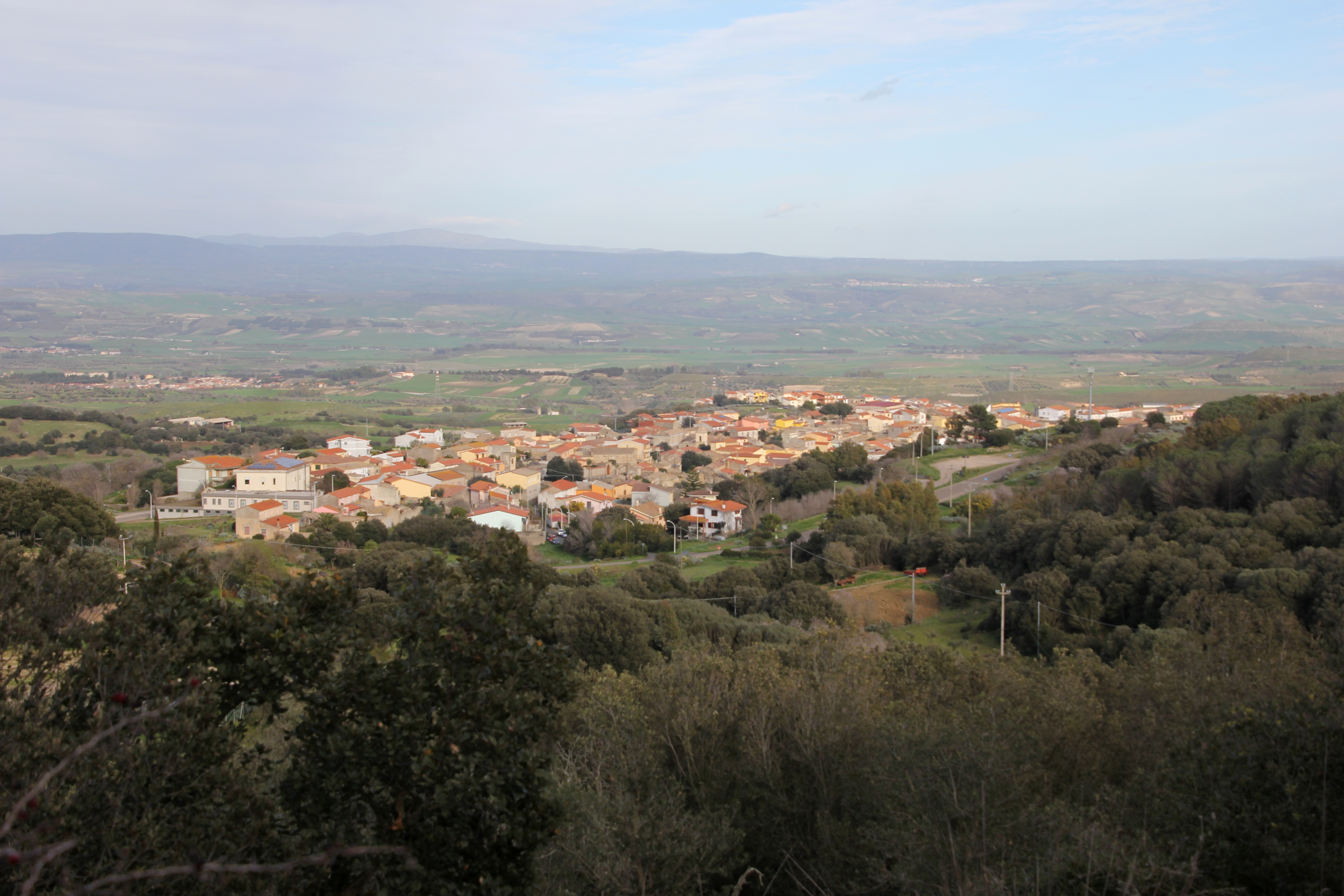
- View of Villanovaforru

- Location within Sardinia
- Coordinates: 39°38′N 8°52′E
- Country: Italy
- Region: Sardinia
- Province: Medio Campidano

Area
  - Total: 10.93 km^{2} (4.22 sq mi)

Population (2026)
  - Total: 789
  - Density: 72.2/km^{2} (187/sq mi)
- Time zone: UTC+1 (CET)
  - Summer (DST): UTC+2 (CEST)
- Postal code: 09020
- Dialing code: 070

Villanovaforru (Sardinian: Biddanoa de Forru) is a village and comune (municipality) in the Province of Medio Campidano in the autonomous island region of Sardinia in Italy, located about 50 kilometres (31 mi) northwest of Cagliari and about 8 kilometres (5 mi) northwest of Sanluri. It has 789 inhabitants.

Villanovaforru borders the municipalities of Collinas, Lunamatrona, Sanluri, and Sardara.

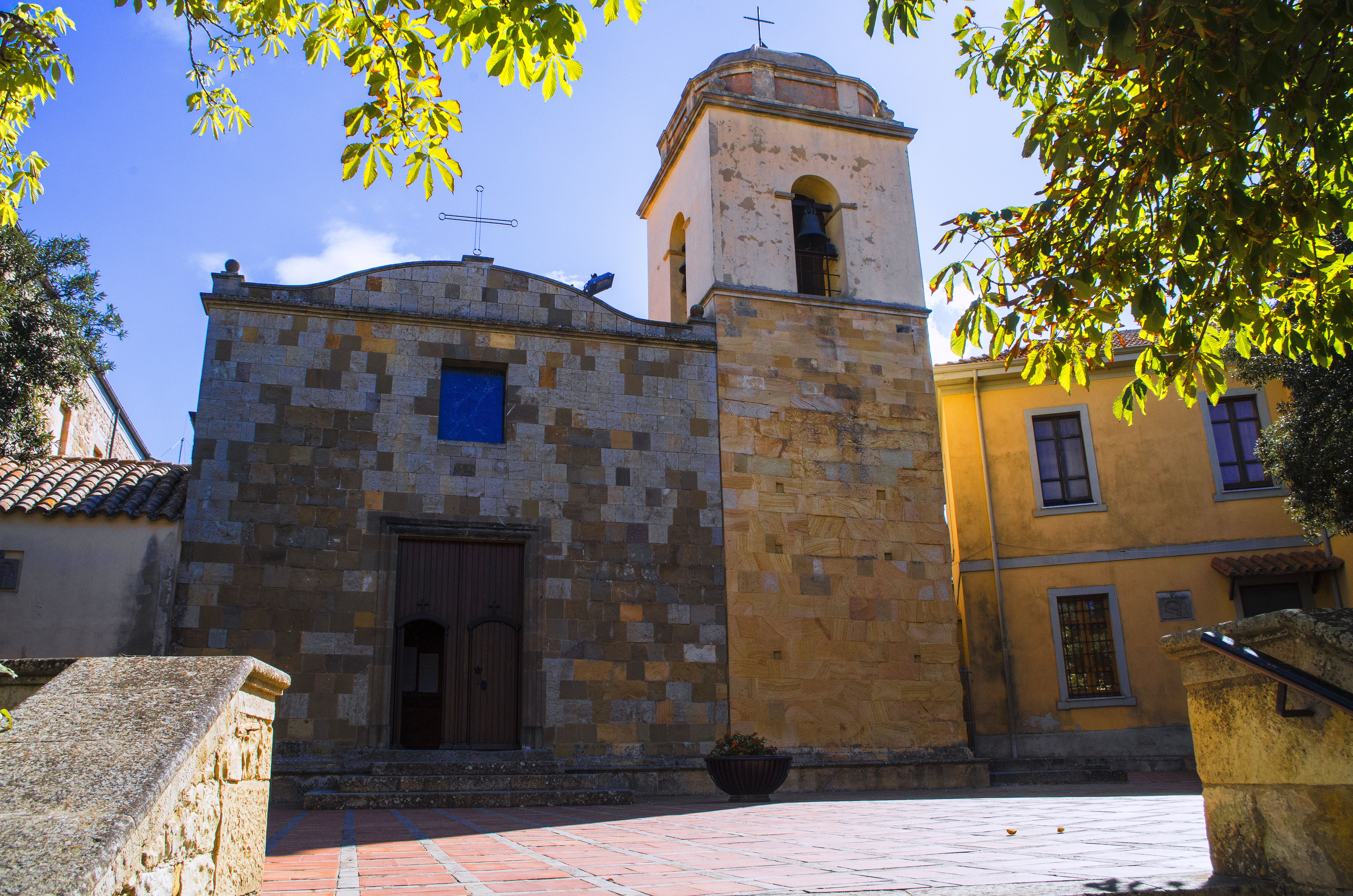
The parish church of St Francis

== Demographics ==
As of 2026, the population is 789, of which 67% are male, and 33% are female. Minors make up 8.2% of the population, and seniors make up 22.2%.

Historical population

Year	Pop.	±%
1861	506	—
1871	517	+2.2%
1881	593	+14.7%
1901	615	+3.7%
1911	655	+6.5%
1921	709	+8.2%
1931	741	+4.5%
1936	770	+3.9%

Year	Pop.	±%
1951	905	+17.5%
1961	931	+2.9%
1971	846	−9.1%
1981	789	−6.7%
1991	739	−6.3%
2001	700	−5.3%
2011	681	−2.7%
2021	622	−8.7%

Source: ISTAT

=== Immigration ===
As of 2025, immigrants make up 25.5% of the population. The 5 largest foreign countries of birth are Pakistan, Afghanistan, Bangladesh, Germany, and France.
