= Mogoro =

Mogoro Mòguru
- Comune
- Comune di Mogoro
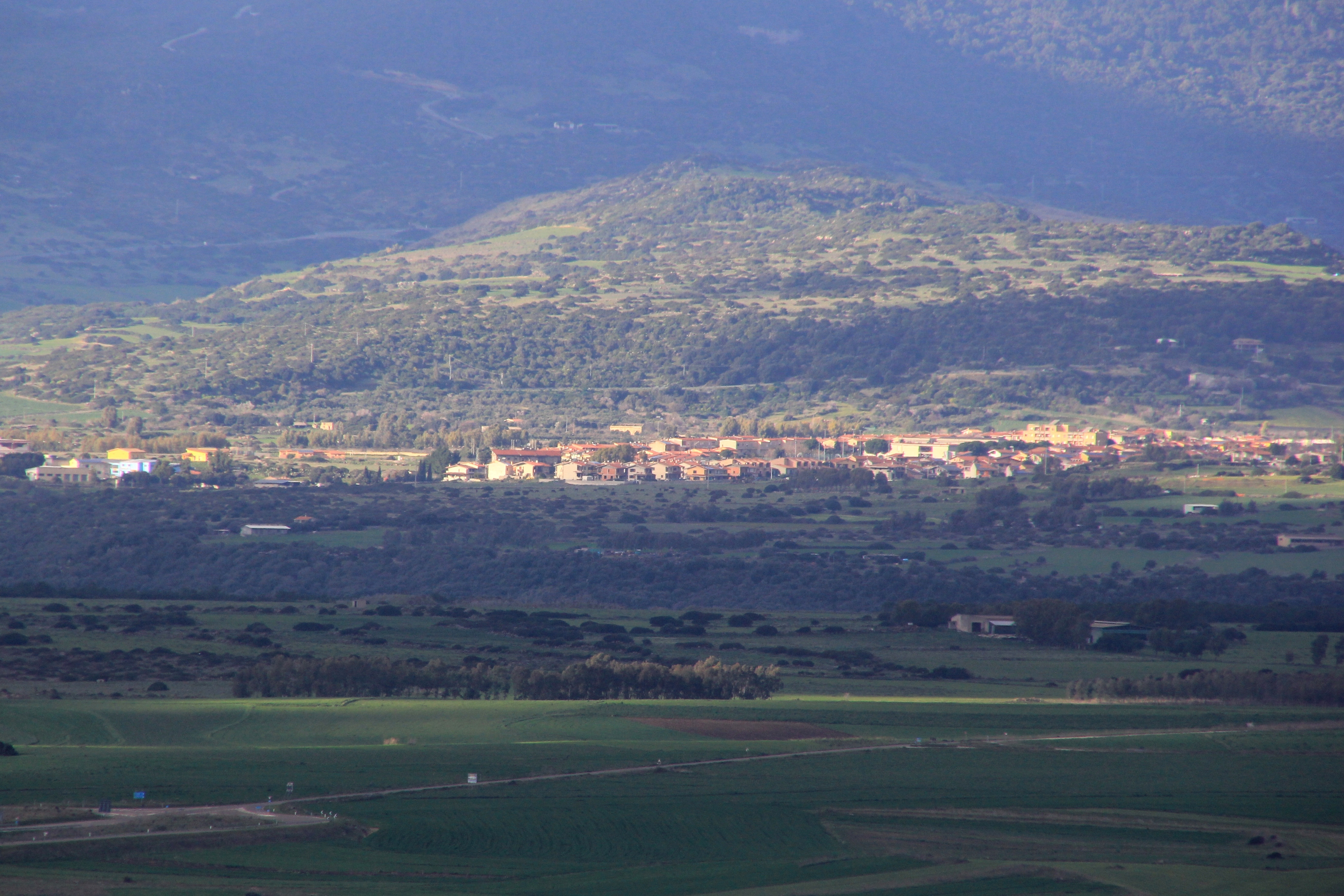

- Location within Sardinia
- Coordinates: 39°41′N 8°47′E
- Country: Italy
- Region: Sardinia
- Province: Oristano (OR)
- Frazioni: Morimenta

Government
  - Mayor: Sandro Broccia

Area
  - Total: 48.99 km^{2} (18.92 sq mi)
- Elevation: 136 m (446 ft)

Population (31 October 2017)
  - Total: 4,128
  - Density: 84.26/km^{2} (218.2/sq mi)
- Demonym: Mogoresi
- Time zone: UTC+1 (CET)
  - Summer (DST): UTC+2 (CEST)
- Postal code: 09095
- Dialing code: 0783
- Website: Official website

Mogoro, Mòguru in sardinian language, is a comune (municipality) in the Province of Oristano in the Italian region Sardinia, located about 60 kilometres (37 mi) northwest of Cagliari and about 30 kilometres (19 mi) southeast of Oristano.

Mogoro borders the following municipalities: Collinas, Gonnostramatza, Masullas, Pabillonis, San Nicolò d'Arcidano, Sardara, Uras. Sights include the Romanesque-Gothic church of the Carmine, built in the early 14th century and the church of Sant'Antioco.

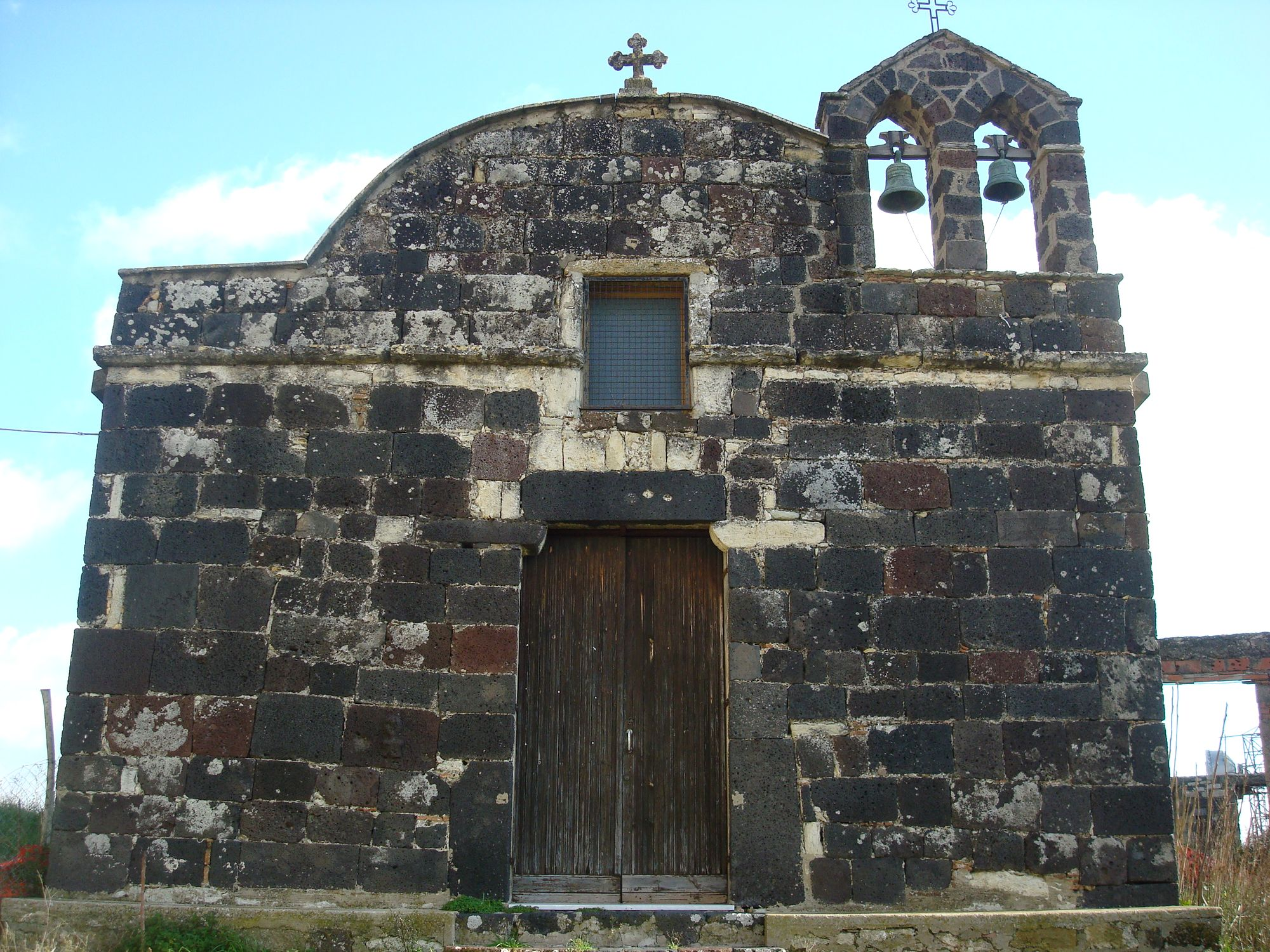
Sant'Antioco's church
