= Fulvio Tocco =

Italian politician (born 1952)

President of the Province of Medio Campidano
- In office 10 May 2005 – 1 July 2013
- Preceded by: Office established
- Succeeded by: Pasquale Onida (commissioner)

Mayor of Serrenti
- In office 31 January 1994 – 10 May 2005

Personal details
- Born: 11 April 1952 (age 74) Serrenti, Sardinia, Italy
- Party: Italian Communist Party; Democratic Party of the Left; Democrats of the Left; Democratic Party

Fulvio Tocco (born 11 April 1952) is an Italian politician of the Democratic Party who served as the first president of the Province of Medio Campidano from 2005 to 2013.

== Life and career ==
Tocco was born in Serrenti, Sardinia, in 1952. He trained as an agricultural technician and worked in the agricultural sector, including for Confcoltivatori. From the age of 24, he also taught at agricultural vocational training centres. He later served as president of the association of farmers and shepherds of the province of Cagliari and of the Cantina Marmilla winery in Sanluri.

A member of the Italian Communist Party, he was elected to the municipal council of Serrenti in 1985. He later joined the Democratic Party of the Left and the Democrats of the Left and served as mayor of Serrenti from 1994 to 2005.

In 2005, Tocco was elected the first president of the newly established Province of Medio Campidano, representing a centre-left coalition. He received 39,624 votes (67.16%), defeating Francesco Atzori, the centre-right candidate. Tocco was re-elected in 2010 for the Democratic Party, receiving the 55.13% of the vote against Efisio Luigi Meloni. His second term ended in July 2013, when the province was placed under a regional commissioner.

After leaving politics, Tocco devoted himself to writing, publishing works focusing on the history and culture of Sardinia.
