= Sardara =

Sardara Sàrdara (Sardinian)
- Comune
- Comune di Sardara
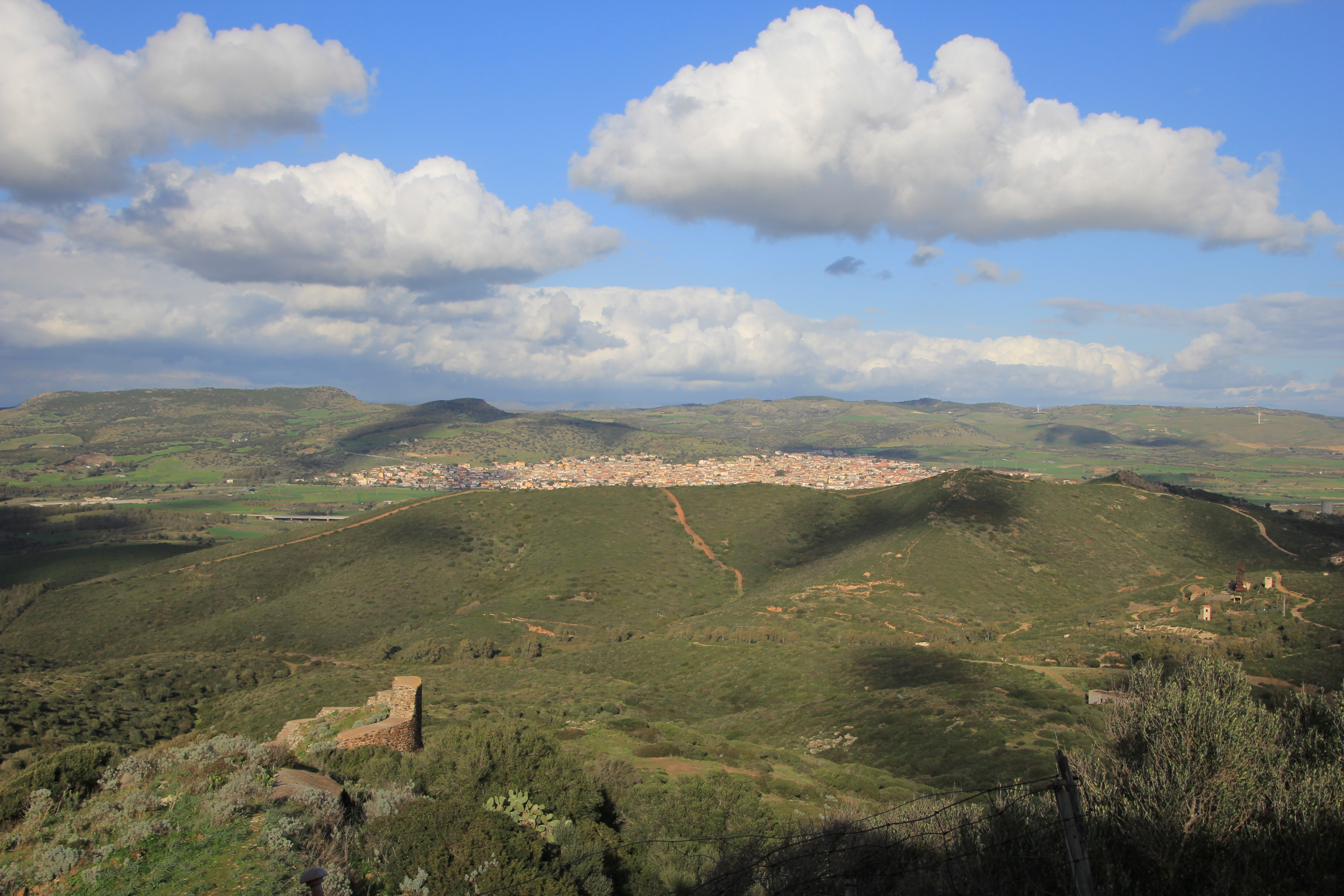
- Panorama from Monreale Castle

- Coat of arms

- Location within Sardinia
- Coordinates: 39°37′N 8°50′E
- Country: Italy
- Region: Sardinia
- Province: Medio Campidano

Government
  - Mayor: Giorgio Zucca

Area
  - Total: 56.23 km^{2} (21.71 sq mi)

Population (2026)
  - Total: 3,711
  - Density: 66.00/km^{2} (170.9/sq mi)
- Demonym: Sardaresi
- Time zone: UTC+1 (CET)
  - Summer (DST): UTC+2 (CEST)
- Postal code: 09030
- Dialing code: 070

Sardara (Sardinian: Sàrdara) is a town and comune (municipality) in the Province of Medio Campidano in the autonomous island region of Sardinia in Italy, located about 50 kilometres (31 mi) northwest of Cagliari and about 8 kilometres (5 mi) northwest of Sanluri. It has 3,711 inhabitants.

Located in the Campidano plain, Sardara is part of the historical region of Marmilla, and borders the municipalities of Collinas, Mogoro, Pabillonis, San Gavino Monreale, Sanluri, Villanovaforru.

== Demographics ==
As of 2026, the population is 3,711, of which 49.6% are male, and 50.4% are female. Minors make up 12.1% of the population, and seniors make up 30.3%.

Historical population

Year	Pop.	±%
1861	2,474	—
1871	2,683	+8.4%
1881	2,661	−0.8%
1901	3,084	+15.9%
1911	3,306	+7.2%
1921	3,099	−6.3%
1931	3,369	+8.7%
1936	3,541	+5.1%

Year	Pop.	±%
1951	3,942	+11.3%
1961	4,137	+4.9%
1971	4,155	+0.4%
1981	4,406	+6.0%
1991	4,503	+2.2%
2001	4,350	−3.4%
2011	4,168	−4.2%
2021	3,842	−7.8%

Source: ISTAT

=== Immigration ===
As of 2025, immigrants make up 2.8% of the population. The 5 largest foreign countries of birth are France, Germany, Romania, Ukraine, and the United Kingdom.

== Heritage Site ==
The Law was implemented by the ruling power of the castle's leaders that dominated the region, while protected its population, the clergy and trading affairs with the help of the Giudical Army, composed by soldiers and free citizens under the direction of the elite corps and the Genoese crossbowmen.
