= Collinas =

Collinas Forru (Sardinian)
- Comune
- Comune di Collinas
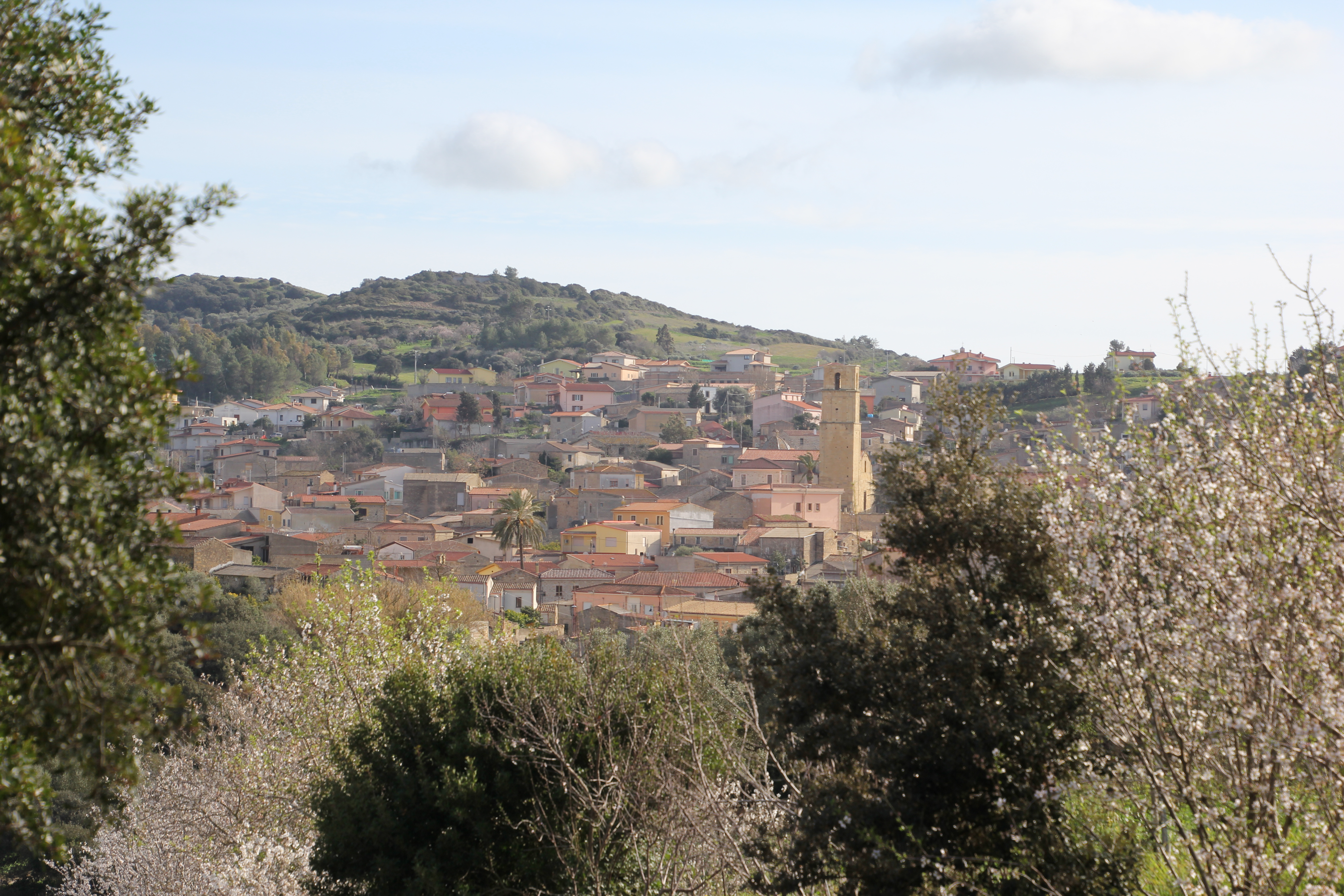
- View of Collinas

- Location within Sardinia
- Coordinates: 39°38′N 8°51′E
- Country: Italy
- Region: Sardinia
- Province: Medio Campidano

Area
  - Total: 20.83 km^{2} (8.04 sq mi)
- Elevation: 249 m (817 ft)

Population (2026)
  - Total: 741
  - Density: 35.6/km^{2} (92.1/sq mi)
- Time zone: UTC+1 (CET)
  - Summer (DST): UTC+2 (CEST)
- Postal code: 09020
- Dialing code: 070

Collinas (Sardinian: Forru) is a village and comune (municipality) in the Province of Medio Campidano in the autonomous island region of Sardinia in Italy, located about 50 kilometres (31 mi) northwest of Cagliari and about 9 kilometres (6 mi) northwest of Sanluri. It has 741 inhabitants.

Collinas borders the municipalities of Gonnostramatza, Lunamatrona, Mogoro, Sardara, Siddi, and Villanovaforru.

== Demographics ==
As of 2026, the population is 741, of which 48.9% are male, and 51.1% are female. Minors make up 8.9% of the population, and seniors make up 35.9%.

Historical population

Year	Pop.	±%
1861	976	—
1871	1,012	+3.7%
1881	1,072	+5.9%
1901	1,033	−3.6%
1911	1,088	+5.3%
1921	1,065	−2.1%
1931	1,040	−2.3%
1936	1,091	+4.9%

Year	Pop.	±%
1951	1,206	+10.5%
1961	1,213	+0.6%
1971	1,129	−6.9%
1981	1,145	+1.4%
1991	1,076	−6.0%
2001	1,014	−5.8%
2011	885	−12.7%
2021	781	−11.8%

Source: ISTAT

=== Immigration ===
As of 2025, immigrants make up 2.6% of the total population. The 5 largest foreign countries of birth are France, Romania, Morocco, Germany, and Kyrgyzstan.
