= Monte Linas =

Mountain in Italy

Coordinates: 39°27′N 8°37′E

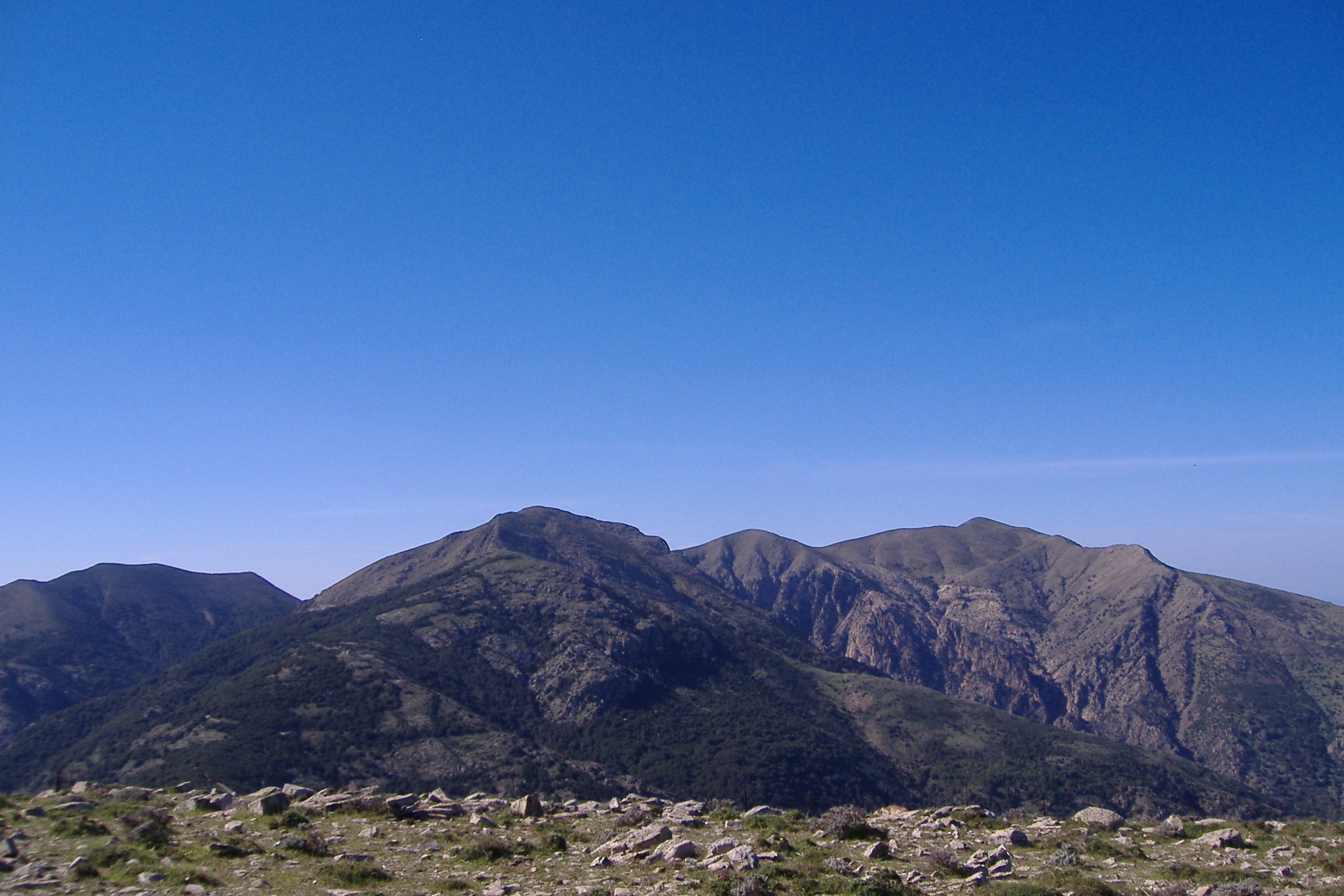

Highest point
- Elevation: 1,236 m (4,055 ft)
- Prominence: 1,182 m (3,878 ft)
- Listing: Ribu

Geography
- Location within Italy
- Country: Italy
- Region(s): South Sardinia, Sardinia, Italy

Monte Linas is a massif in the province of South Sardinia, in south-western Sardinia, Italy. It is mostly composed of granite, and includes numerous mineral deposits, such as zinc and lead. Peaks include Perda de sa Mesa (1,236 m), the highest peak in southern Sardinia, Monte Lisone (1,082 m), punta di San Miali (1,062 m), punta Magusu (1,023 m).
