= San Gavino Monreale =

San Gavino Monreale Santu 'Èngiu (Sardinian)
- Comune
- Comune di San Gavino Monreale
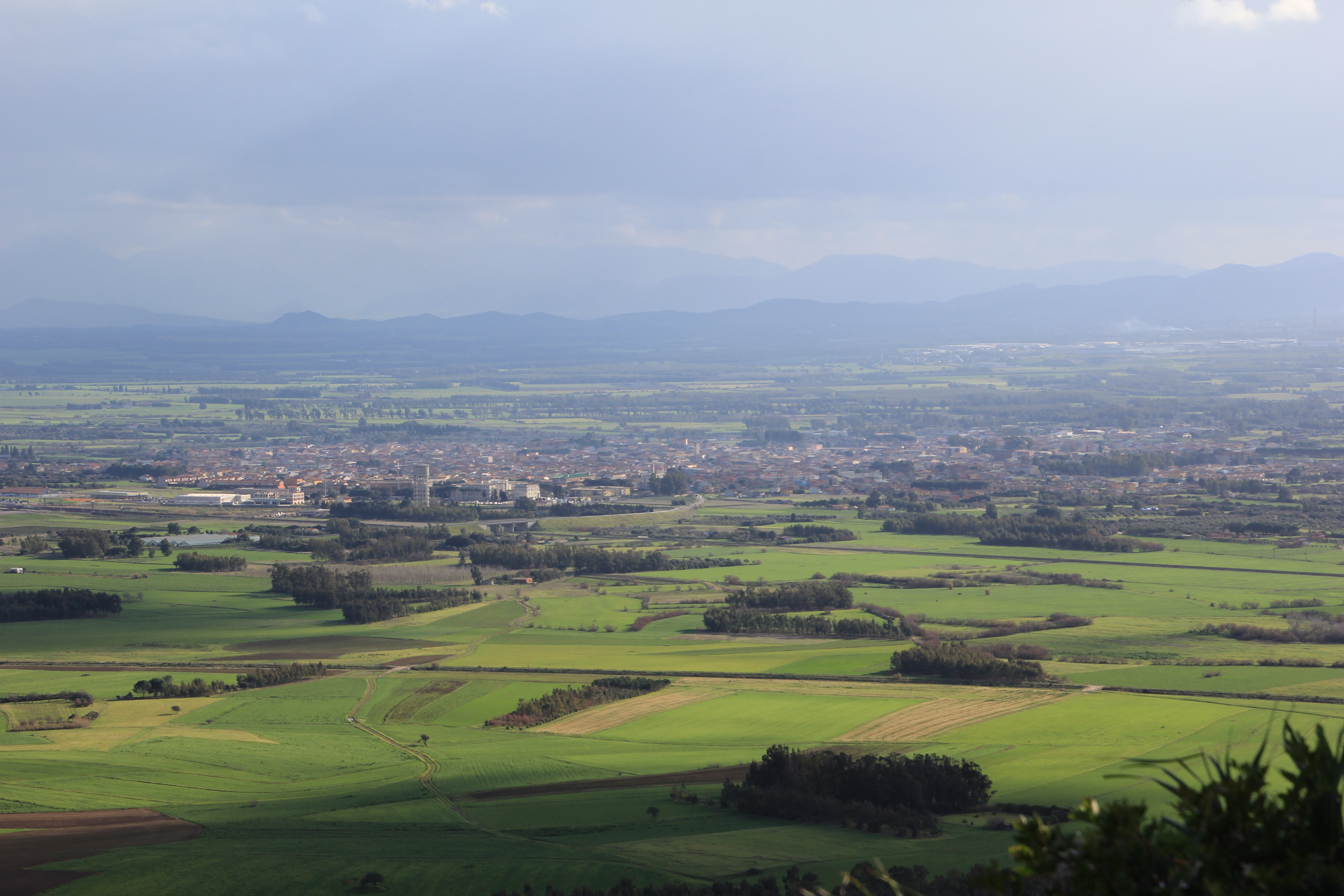
- View of San Gavino Monreale

- Coat of arms

- Location within Sardinia
- Coordinates: 39°33′N 8°48′E
- Country: Italy
- Region: Sardinia
- Province: Medio Campidano

Government
  - Mayor: Carlo Tomasi

Area
  - Total: 87.40 km^{2} (33.75 sq mi)
- Elevation: 51 m (167 ft)

Population (2026)
  - Total: 7,823
  - Density: 89.51/km^{2} (231.8/sq mi)
- Demonym: Sangavinesi
- Time zone: UTC+1 (CET)
  - Summer (DST): UTC+2 (CEST)
- Postal code: 09037
- Dialing code: 070
- Patron saint: St. Clare
- Saint day: August 12
- Website: Official website

San Gavino Monreale (Sardinian: Santu 'Èngiu) is a comune (municipality) in the Province of Medio Campidano in the autonomous island region of Sardinia in Italy, located about 45 kilometres (28 mi) northwest of Cagliari, and roughly halfway between the latter and the town of Oristano. It has 7,823 inhabitants.

San Gavino Monreale borders the municipalities of Gonnosfanadiga, Pabillonis, Sanluri, Sardara, and Villacidro. It is home to a castle.

== History ==
The area of San Gavino was already settled in the Nuragic era, but the centre is of medieval origin. It was a possession of the Giudicato of Arborea and, later, of the Aragonese, being mostly destroyed in the ensuing war. Subsequently it was a fief of the Centelles and of the Osorio families, who held it until 1839.

== Demographics ==
As of 2026, the population is 7,823, of which 48.5% are male, and 51.5% are female. Minors make up 11.1% of the population, and seniors make up 32.1%.

Historical population

Year	Pop.	±%
1861	2,654	—
1871	2,654	+0.0%
1881	2,841	+7.0%
1901	3,247	+14.3%
1911	3,527	+8.6%
1921	3,809	+8.0%
1931	4,183	+9.8%
1936	5,061	+21.0%

Year	Pop.	±%
1951	7,410	+46.4%
1961	8,344	+12.6%
1971	8,723	+4.5%
1981	10,013	+14.8%
1991	10,119	+1.1%
2001	9,460	−6.5%
2011	8,894	−6.0%
2021	8,160	−8.3%

Source: ISTAT

=== Immigration ===
As of 2025, immigrants make up 2.6% of the population. The 5 largest foreign countries of birth are France, Romania, Germany, Ukraine, and China.

== Notable people ==
- Fabio Aru, cyclist
