= Pabillonis =

Comune in Sardinia, Italy

- Comune
- Comune di Pabillonis
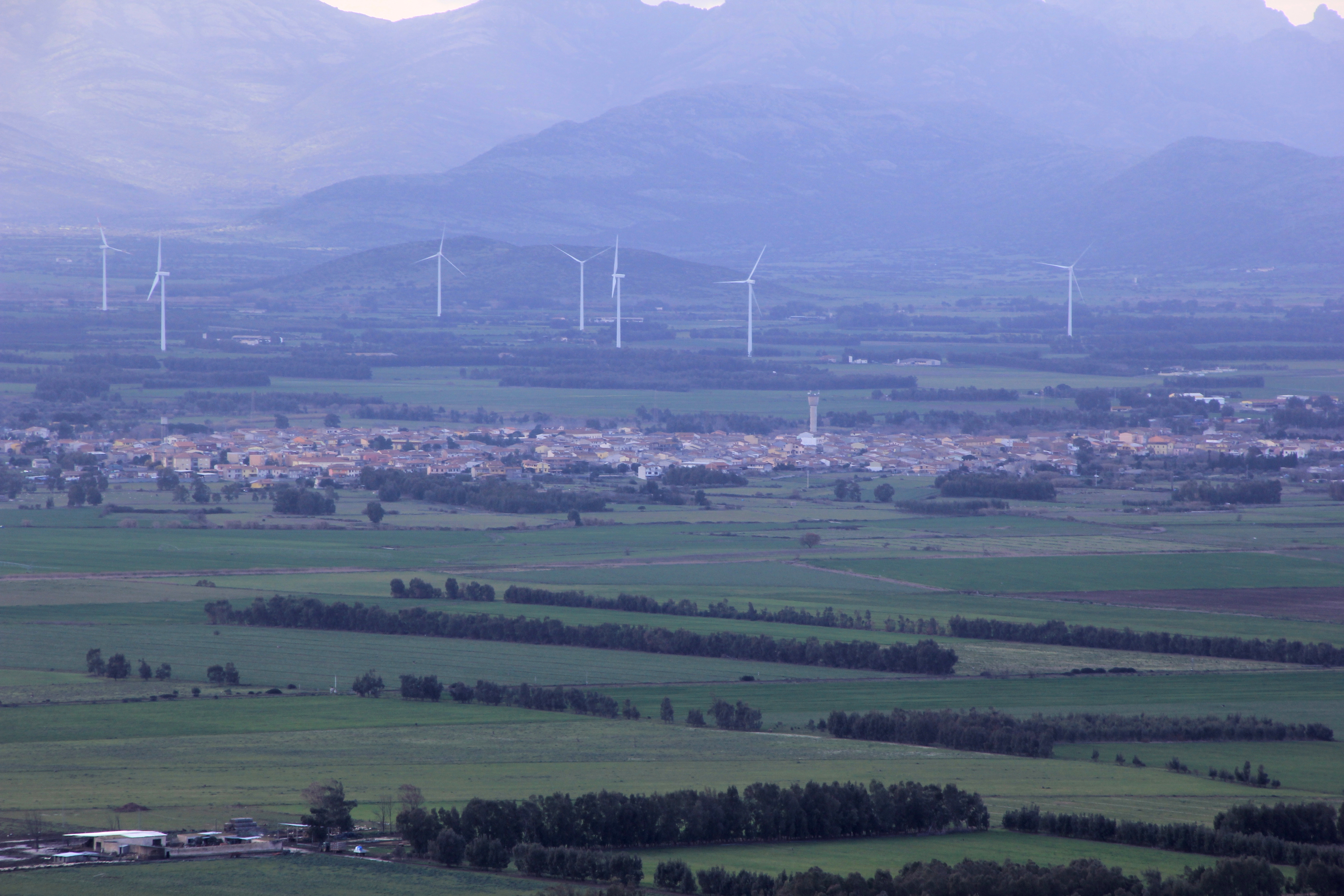
- View of Pabillonis

- Coat of arms

- Location within Sardinia
- Coordinates: 39°36′N 8°43′E
- Country: Italy
- Region: Sardinia
- Province: Medio Campidano
- Frazioni: Foddi

Government
  - Mayor: Riccardo Sanna

Area
  - Total: 37.42 km^{2} (14.45 sq mi)
- Elevation: 42 m (138 ft)

Population (2026)
  - Total: 2,404
  - Density: 64.24/km^{2} (166.4/sq mi)
- Demonym: Pabillonesi
- Time zone: UTC+1 (CET)
  - Summer (DST): UTC+2 (CEST)
- Postal code: 09030
- Dialing code: 070
- Website: Official website

Pabillonis is a town and comune (municipality) in the Province of Medio Campidano in the autonomous island region of Sardinia in Italy, about 50 kilometres (31 mi) northwest of Cagliari and about 15 kilometres (9 mi) west of Sanluri. It has 2,404 inhabitants.

Pabillonis borders the municipalities of Gonnosfanadiga, Guspini, Mogoro, San Gavino Monreale, San Nicolò d'Arcidano, and Sardara.

== Etymology ==
The origin of the name derives from the Latin "Papilio-ionis" meaning Roman military camps set up on site (in English they are the so-called "pavilions"). In Sardinian the term has evolved into "Pabillone", "Papigione", "Papidzone" or "Pabunzone" to indicate a woodshed and, in some cases, even shelter for animals. This term, however, is widespread in the center-north of Sardinia, while it is not reflected in the local dialect of Pabillonis as to define the shelter of animals is used "Coratzu" and "Sa domu de sa linna" is the generic definition of the place where it was acatastated firewood. In the 1388 documents establishing the peace between Aragon and Arborea, the village is named as "Paviglionis", "Pavigionis" and "Panigionis".

Quando Leonora patteggiava col re di Aragona...esisteva già Pavillonis... Nella nota degli attori e procuratori... leggesi Panigionis, ma non-si può dubitare che l'originale avesse Paviglionis o Pavigionis.

— Vittorio Angius
Translation:

When Leonora was bargaining with the king of Aragon... Pavillonis already existed... In the note of the actors and procurators... read Panigionis, but one cannot doubt that the original had Paviglionis or Pavigionis.

== History ==
Tra le saggine palustri
Pabillonis è un'anatra
Ch'io vidi una sera,
Così poco vivo a quel fuoco
In sogno: una larva di luce
Là dietro la zanzariera.

— Leonardo Sinisgalli, 1941
Translation:

Among the marshy broomcorn
Pabillonis is a duck
That I saw one night,
So little alive at that fire
In a dream: a larva of light
Behind the mosquito net.

The first evidence of man in the territories of Pabillonis date back to the Neolithic period (6th – 3rd millennium BC), in fact it is often possible to find fragments of worked obsidian. The massive presence of these findings suggest the presence of numerous villages at the water springs and rivers. No trace of typical Neolithic monuments has yet been found. However, it is probable that man lived in these areas even in the Eneolithic. The nuragic civilization has left as testimony the nuraghe "Surbiu" (completely destroyed), the nuraghe Santu Sciori, "Nuraxi Fenu" and the nuraghe "Domu'e Campu".

Originally the village stood a couple of kilometers from the current location, the ruins are located near the rural church of San Lussorio, near the banks of the Flumini Mannu (more formerly Ptolemy refers to "Rivus Sacer" "sacred" or "Hierus") where the waters of the Rio Piras and Riu Bruncu Fenugu meet. The homonymous nuraghe (Santu Sciori) and a Roman bridge (still standing) called Su ponti de sa baronessa testify to the ancient origins of the village. During the Middle Ages it belonged to the giudicato of Arborea and more precisely to the curatorial office of Bonorzuli, the ancient centre was destroyed by the Saracens and rebuilt in its current position. At the fall of the judiciary (1420) it became part of the marquisate of Oristano, and from 1478, at its final defeat, it passed under the Aragonese dominion. The Aragonese incorporated the town into the county of Quirra, which was transformed into a marquisate in 1603, together with the barony of Monreale. Also in the Aragonese period, the town was first a feud of the Carroz, then of the Centelles and finally of the Osorio de la Cueva, to whom it was redeemed in 1839 with the suppression of the feudal system. In 1584 it was sacked by the Moors and the town was abandoned, the historian Vittorio Angius wrote: "... the barbarians were led there by a Sardinian renegade, [...], except for the people saved by the escape, the others were massacred or taken in slavery".

In 1934, during the fascist period, the reclamation of the marshes around the Flumini Mannu was carried out. On 5, 7, and 8 September 1943, the Pabillonis airfield in the Foddi region was bombed by a total of 112 P-40 planes from the 325th Allied Forces group. The fighter bombers dropped 20-pound bombs on the airfield and other targets. This was the last act of the war in Sardinia. A few hours later Badoglio officially announced Italy's exit from the conflict.

== Geography ==
It is located in the centre-north of the Campidano plain, more precisely north of the "Pranu Murdegu", near the confluence of two waterways called Flumini Mannu and Flumini Bellu. It is mainly an agricultural village.

The village develops around the church of San Giovanni, once a country church and chapel of an old cemetery on which currently stands a square.

== Demographics ==
Historical population
Year	Pop.	±%
1861	1,389	—
1871	1,449	+4.3%
1881	1,563	+7.9%
1901	1,483	−5.1%
1911	1,670	+12.6%
1921	1,668	−0.1%
1931	1,813	+8.7%
1936	1,983	+9.4%
1951	2,539	+28.0%
1961	2,793	+10.0%
1971	3,150	+12.8%
1981	3,123	−0.9%
1991	3,106	−0.5%
2001	3,044	−2.0%
2011	2,948	−3.2%
2021	2,540	−13.8%
Source: ISTAT

As of 2026, the population is 2,404, of which 51.0% are male, and 49.0% are female. Minors make up 10.3% of the population, and seniors make up 28.5%.

=== Languages and dialects ===
The variant of Sardinian spoken in Pabillonis is the western campidanese.

=== Immigration ===
As of 2025, immigrants make up 2.5% of the population. The 5 largest foreign countries of birth are Senegal, Romania, Germany, Hungary, and India.

== Sights ==
=== Religious architectures ===
==== Beata Vergine della Neve ====
The parish church of the Beata Vergine della Neve (Blessed Virgin of Snow) is the building with the most artistic vestiges. Built in the sixteenth century with a rectangular plan with three naves, the interior preserves frescoes. The simple façade is composed of a portal surrounded by pilasters. Inside the church there is a wooden tabernacle of the seventeenth century attributed to Giovanni Angelo Puxeddu.

==== San Giovanni Battista ====
San Giovanni Battista (Saint John the Baptist) is the oldest of the churches of Pabillonis, dating from the twelfth century and was part of the old cemetery.

In Romanesque style, with a rectangular plan, a single nave and barrel vault, it has a bell tower with a double bell.

=== Nuraghes ===
Near the ancient and the present inhabited village there are the nuraghes of Santu Sciori and Nuraxi Fenu and according to what Vittorio Angius wrote: «Within the circumscription of this territory there are three nuraghi, one called Surbiu, a little less than a mile from the town and mostly undone; the other called Nuraxi-Fenu, almost a mile and a half away, and worthy of being considered and evenovered to 'larger known, which are the next in the territory of Guspini, the Saureci, the Fumìu and the Orco; the third named by the Church of San Lussorio, close to the river, is also worth a visit for its size. It was surrounded by another building and two nuraghetti of this one can still be seen in part. In one of which, at the beginning of the current century, a quadrilong urn of two and a half meters was discovered on the major side, and inside the same of the great bones (!!)».

=== Santu Sciori ===
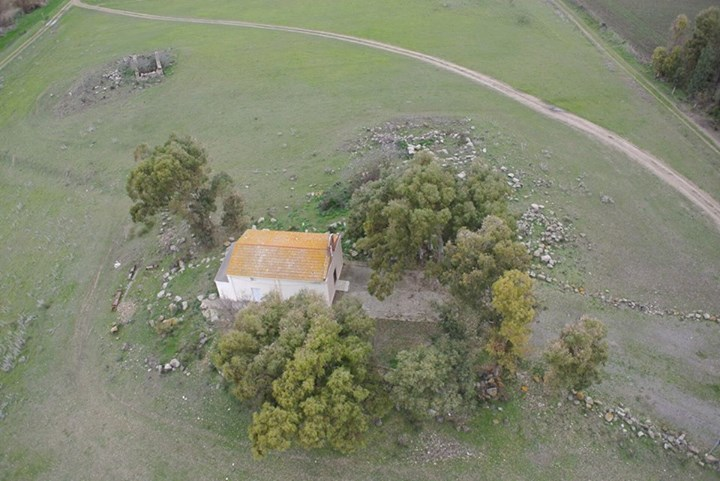
Santu Sciori shot by drone

The nuraghe Santu Sciori is located in the area of San Lussorio where the ancient ruins are located; it has a poly-lobed bastion and antemural towers, probably dating back to 1300 BC. (Middle Bronze Age). In the Middle Ages it was used as a burial area, this reuse is evidenced by the discovery in the nineteenth century of a cinerary urn inside the ruins of one of its towers. Currently part of the nuragic complex is under the church built in the 70s (the ruins of the ancient church are located a few tens of meters from the actual), would require archaeological excavations to reconstruct more accurately the history of that area since written evidence is rare.

=== Nuraghe Fenu ===
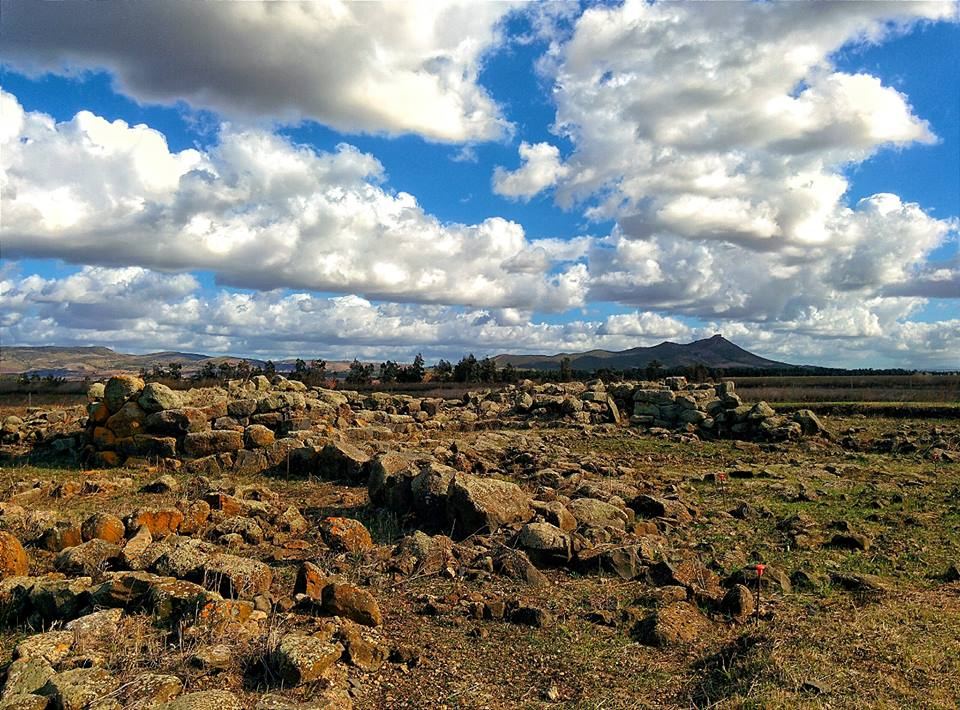
Nuraghe Fenu

The Nuraxi Fenu is located about 3 km from the current town near the train station. Excavations begun in 1996 have brought to light many fragments of vases and also lanterns and some Roman coins that prove the attendance of the site in the imperial age. The remains of the nuraghe, which extend for about 2,000 square meters, belong to a large poly-lobed complex (among the largest in Sardinia) dating back to the Middle Bronze (1300 BC). Vittorio Angius, speaking of San Gavino says: "It can therefore be kept that within the limits of the territory of San Gavino arose in older times more than sixteen nuraghes, and that some of 'same were as big as what you see still in the vicinity of Pabillonis, which is one of' more colossal island ...". When Angius wrote these words, the nuragic palace of Barumini had not yet been excavated. The stratigraphy has highlighted the abandonment of the nuraghe already in ancient times due to a fire and a collapse. It was then re-frequented by Punic people and later by the Romans. The oldest layer of settlements has not yet been excavated. The finds are currently kept in the archaeological museum of Sardara.

=== Other nuragic monuments ===
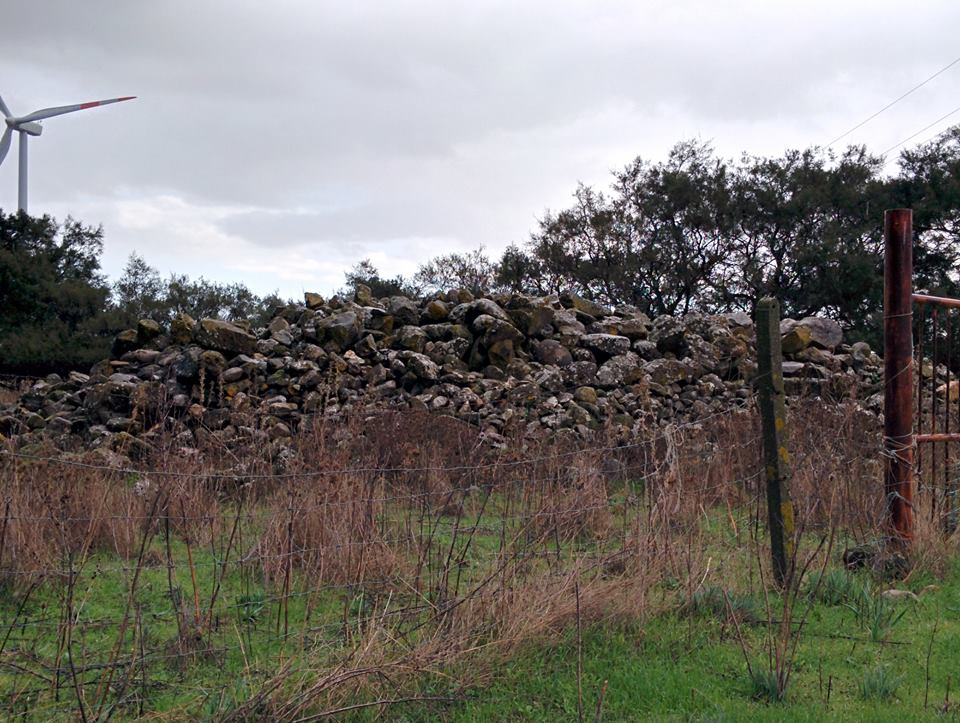
Nuraghe Dom'e Campu

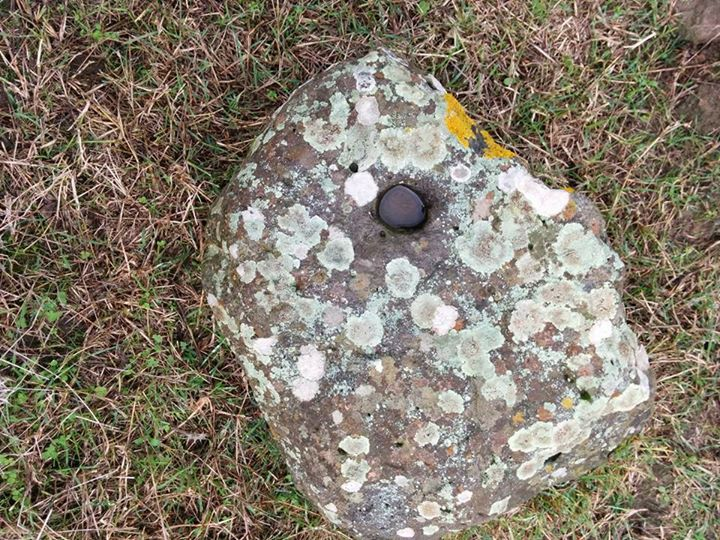
A worked stone of nuraghe Surbiu

To these two nuraghi, just mentioned, must also be added three others of which no trace remains or almost remains:

- Nuraghe Dom'e Campu, was located in the area of Dom'e Campu, very close to the current industrial area PIP. It is assumed that around the nuraghe there was a large settlement given the many discoveries made.
- Nuraghe De Sa Fronta, no longer existing, its remains were used as large pens for livestock. It was located very close to the road leading to the railway station.
- Nuraghe Surbiu, some stones and a little more along the road Montangesa, in memory of a site that according to local records was used later as a furnace.
- Beyond these, about 900 meters in the NE direction from the Nurage De Sa Fronta there are the remains of the Giants' grave S'Ena and Zimini.

=== Archaeological Park ===
On 4 December 2018, the municipality of Pabillonis informed all citizens of the effective establishment of the Pabillonis Archaeological Park, with the intention of enhancing and promoting all local archaeological sites.

=== Casa Museo ===
The Casa Museo is located in the heart of the historic centre of Pabillon. It is an old two-storey house made of unfired earth, finely restored and furnished with antique objects. Belonged to the Cherchi family, it was then donated by the same family to the municipality that gave it this new cultural and historical purpose. It is currently used to host exhibitions and cultural events at various times of the year. It also houses the traditional clothes of Pabillonis.

== Culture ==
=== Traditions and folklore ===
Of great importance are the religious celebrations that also take on a folkloric imprint. Below is a list of the most common festivals and events in Pabillonis.

==== Festivities ====
- 16 January: Saint Anthony Abbot, also called Saint Antoni 'e su fogu. It is a night party, based on the lighting of a large bonfire (in Sardinian Su fogadoni);
- 13 May: Madonna di Fátima;
- 24 June: Saint John the Baptist, the nativity of Saint John the Baptist is celebrated;
- 5 August: Blessed Virgin of the Snow, patronal feast;
- 18 August: San Lussorio, takes place in the homonymous country church;
- 29 August: Saint John the Baptist remembers the death of Saint John the Baptist with the preparation of Is carrus de s'àlinu (àbiu), ox-drawn chariots and tractors decorated with alder branches;
- 31 December: Su trigu cotu (cooked wheat), an ancient custom: you pass through the houses distributing cooked wheat as a wish for a good omen for the new year.

=== Arts ===
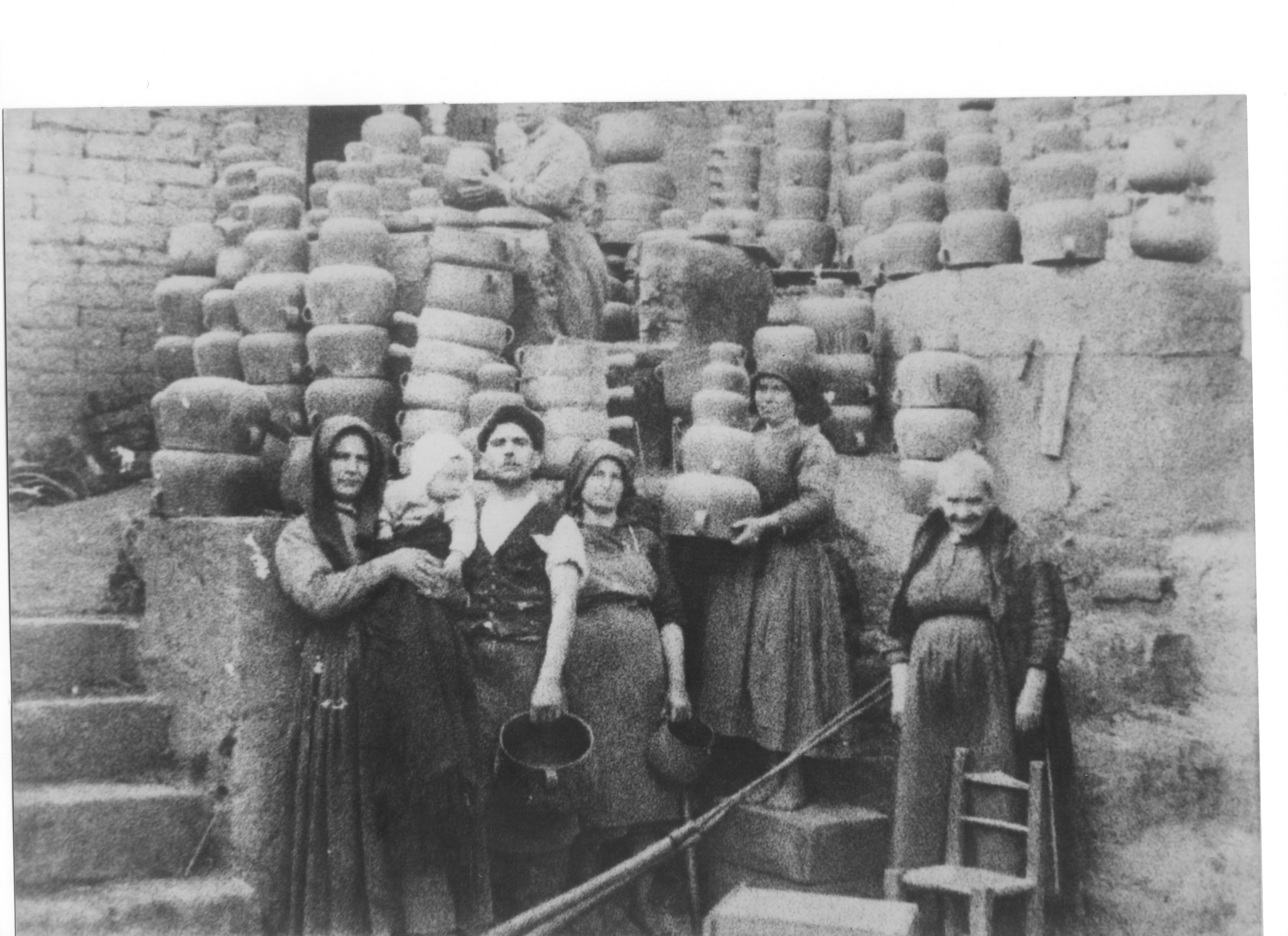
Immagine storica di Pabillonis – Produzione pentole

The terracotta still produced in Pabillonis, nicknamed Sa bidda de is pingiadas (the town of pans), is considered to be very famous, as are the handcrafted wicker, wood and reed products, which are exhibited annually in August in dedicated handcrafted exhibitions. Equally famous are the raw earth bricks (a mixture of mud and straw) called Ladins that still characterize the architectural aspect of the country and that are trying to enhance through the preservation and restoration of existing homes.

Since ancient times, Pabillonis has been known above all in the poorest areas of Sardinia as sa bidda de is pingiadas (the land of pans).

This fame derives from the quality of the terracotta products, which were marketed throughout the island. At the beginning of the nineteenth century (a period of which we have a lot of documentation), life in Pabillonis was quite active: the main activities were agriculture, trade in livestock, basketwork and those related to terracotta. The raw materials for these productions were available directly in the marshlands of Pabillonis. This is where the importance of master potters, tile makers and brick makers originated.

==== Tiles makers ====
The tile makers were the craftsmen who produced terracotta tiles for covering the roofs of houses. The origin of this activity, much older than existing documents, was probably handed down from father to son. In 1837 there were 20 craftsmen working there plus helpers, usually boys or women with the task of extracting and preparing the clay. Already in 1850 this production was in decline, 17 craftsmen were active, 13 of which were manufacturers of pottery and 4 of bricks and tiles. It is not known whether the decrease in the production of terracotta and bricks is due to the decrease in market demand or whether various problems have arisen.

It is known for certain that the local administrators were forced to regulate these activities because the amount of wood needed to cook the pottery and tiles was greater than the availability. The potters and tile makers consumed more wood in their respective professions than the entire municipality throughout the year for their own use.

In 1853, the workers in the field of cooked earth and the municipal administration signed a contract to regulate these activities. The administration granted land for the construction of a kiln, and placed various clauses on the trade in tiles and bricks.

This contract provided for the land to be transferred to the roofers for ten years and guaranteed to those who eventually abandoned the business to claim the part of the furnace he had built. In addition, producers were given priority for the purchase of bricks and tiles by the inhabitants of Pabillonis. In fact, nothing could be sold in the other countries before four days after firing. By giving priority to the Pabillonians, speculation on the price of manufactured goods at the expense of the community was prevented.

For these rules to be respected, there were strict controls. Since the only raw material not available in the country was wood, it was purchased from neighbouring countries under strict regulations. Tiles were required to buy wood with an amount of tiles and bricks equivalent to the value of the wood itself. This meant that tiles and bricks could not be sold elsewhere during the supply of wood without waiting for the four-day marketing period. The municipality employees checked that the quantity of tiles and bricks loaded into the wagons corresponded, when they returned, to the value of the wood bought. In the event of irregularities, a fine of one lira for every hundred bricks and tiles over and above the recorded quantity was set.

The restrictions applied to the trade in tiles and bricks succeeded in protecting the interests of the population but in part stifled the growth of this sector. There were not only regulations for trade, but some also concerned the use of land granted for the extraction of clay. It happened at a certain point that in the land used for the extraction of clay that these began to be cultivated, the municipality intervened by deciding: "since they keep sown some seed, they use it in this year only, without ever being able to seed by fate".

This resolution aimed to avoid that little by little these lands ended up in private hands and that the contained resources remained public. Even the tile makers, however, could count on the services of protection dedicated to them. In the case of unsold material, it was possible to contact the mayor to sell the surplus material through a public tender. Finally, the price for 100 tiles was set at 2.88 lire for tiles, 2.40 for bricks. From these sets of standards, which covered every aspect from production to marketing, one can understand the importance of this activity.

==== The potters ====
The potters in Pabillonis played a leading role, in fact the goods produced were mostly of daily use and consisted of pots, pans, cups and bowls in terracotta.

The secrets of the trade were handed down from father to son, the quality of the products was guaranteed both by the wisdom of the figoli (lathes), both by the quality of raw materials, these were the reasons why the terracottas produced in Pabillonis were sold throughout Sardinia. The clay, called "sa terra de stréxu" was already available in the lands of the country, the land was entrusted by the municipality to the craftsmen, and were in the locality "domu de campu" or where the ancient village of Pabillonis stood. This suggests how old the link between Pabillonis and cooked earth is.

==== Sa terra de stréxu ====
The clay was extracted mainly in July, after the harvesting of the fields because there were fewer agricultural commitments and the fields were clear. It was easy to recognize a clay strand because the earth above it, burnt by the sun, generated showy cracks. Once the brushwood had been removed, it was dug to a depth of about 60 cm, after which it was extracted. Once extracted, the clay was left to dry on the spot, once dried it was transported by women with typical baskets with 2 handles on the head or by workers through carts. This, however, was only one of the necessary raw materials, the clay that was baked was composed of "sa terra de orbetzu" and "sa terra de pistai".

==== Sa terra de pistai ====
It was obtained from sandy soils, it was yellowish in colour, it was not malleable, but it was used to make the dough refractory, thus giving the pots and pans an excellent resistance to fire, making them suitable for daily use. This land was taken along the banks of frummi bellu (or even Riu bellu), in an area called "arrùbiu margins" (margin, red shore). Once collected it had to be filtered to remove impurities.

==== Sa terra de orbetzu ====
It was left immersed in water the day before its use, to make it easy to work, while the "terra de pistai" was beaten with a wooden sledgehammer to obtain a very fine powder, after which it was sieved by removing impurities and larger granules. Once the "terra de orbetzu" was softened and the powder obtained from the "terra de pistai", they were mixed. For this purpose, balls were prepared from the first one, placed on the floor to be crushed with the feet, at this point the "terra de pistai" was gradually added, thus obtaining a homogeneous mixture. This mixture was used to make a large roll of clay and to work on a table with the hands (si ciuexiat) both to soften the mixture again and to remove any residual impurities. At this point, the clay thus mixed was placed on the lathe and worked.

15–20 kg of clay were worked at a time, and it was possible to form 18–20 large pots (sa manna). In one day it was possible to produce 18–20 series (cabiddadas), that is 160 pieces. The lathe was paid not according to the number of "cabiddadas" produced.

Usually the clay prepared to avoid hardening was consumed during the day, or it was wrapped in wet bags so that it could be used the next day. The pans, compared to other manufactures, were made by mouth down, after the processing was cut with a thin thread of wool and placed on a board. This technique allowed the construction of rather thin pans. A few hours after processing on the lathe, when the clay began to dry, you could beat the bottom. This operation was called "amonai". The next day, the handles (prepared separately) were attached and the mouth was hemmed. This operation was called "cundrexi".

=== Manufacturing Specifications ===
The series (cabiddada) was composed of five pieces.

- "Sa prima" or "pingiada manna" (the first or large pot).
- "Sa segunda" or "coja duus" (the second).
- "Sa tertza" or "coja tres" (the third).
- "Sa cuarta" or "coja cuàturu" (the fourth).
- "Sa cuinta' or 'coja cincu' (the fifth, a small one, was prepared only by order).

The "coja cincu" was not made for daily use, but for outfit (for the most affluent) or for decorative purposes. It was enamelled inside and out, and on the upper part, it had small engravings. There was another type of pot "sa Sicilia", narrower and higher and with the edge turned. It was composed of three pieces, but usually it was a single request because it cost more than the others. When all the pieces were dried, they were cooked.

==== The oven and the first cooking ====
Until 1920–1930, the oven was cylindrical and uncovered, during the rains it was not possible to cook. If it was starting to rain, it was necessary to protect the oven with shards (tistivillus) and try to cover everything with cloths. To avoid the oven temperature decreasing, it was necessary to throw wood continuously over the fire and hope to save at least part of the cooking time. Afterwards, the ovens began to be made with raw and refractory brick roofs. The capacity of the ovens was 30/40 series of pots or 200 pieces. The oven consisted of a combustion chamber covered by a grid that separated it from the cooking chamber. The pots were baked in series of five, upside down and one inside the other, this method was called "unu pei". (one foot), between each series was positioned "sa Sicilia".

The first cooking lasted one day inside, the staff continuously fed the fire so as to maintain high enough and constant, for each cooking was necessary a large amount of wood. The woods usually used were lentisk (sa ciorroscia) or the flower of the "su erbuzu" called "cadriloi".

==== Enamelling and second firing ====
The enamelling (stangiadura) of the terracotta was made up of a mixture of fourteen minium pots, extracted from the Monteponi mine, and seven of silica (sa perda de fogu). The silica was located in the riverbed of the village itself. Silicon powder was obtained by pounding it in a stone mortar with an iron club. The minium and silica were mixed with bran juice previously filtered in a bag of flax. The mixture was poured on the object to be enamelled and then it was cooked again. The second firing lasted two days and myrtus wood (sa murta) was used. The baking was done in the same way as the first except for the interposition of fragments between the pots to prevent them from sticking to each other when the melting point was reached.

==== The production of bricks in "làrdini" ====
This type of brick is the result of an ancient tradition quite widespread throughout the plain of Campidano. They are unfired earth bricks, raw in fact, obtained from a mix of clay, sand, water and other binding material such as hay.

=== List of handicraft products ===
==== Terracotta ====
- "tèulas" tiles
- "tianus" pans
- "pingiadas" pots, pans
- "sciveddas" basins in terracotta smoothed and polished internally

==== Raw earth ====
- "matoni in làrdini" bricks in unfired earth

==== Cestiary ====
- "scarteddus" baskets
- "cibirus" sieves
- "crobis" corbe

== Transport ==
=== Roads ===
Pabillonis is connected to the neighbouring municipalities by a series of provincial roads, in particular the SP 63, 64, 69 and 72.

=== Railways ===
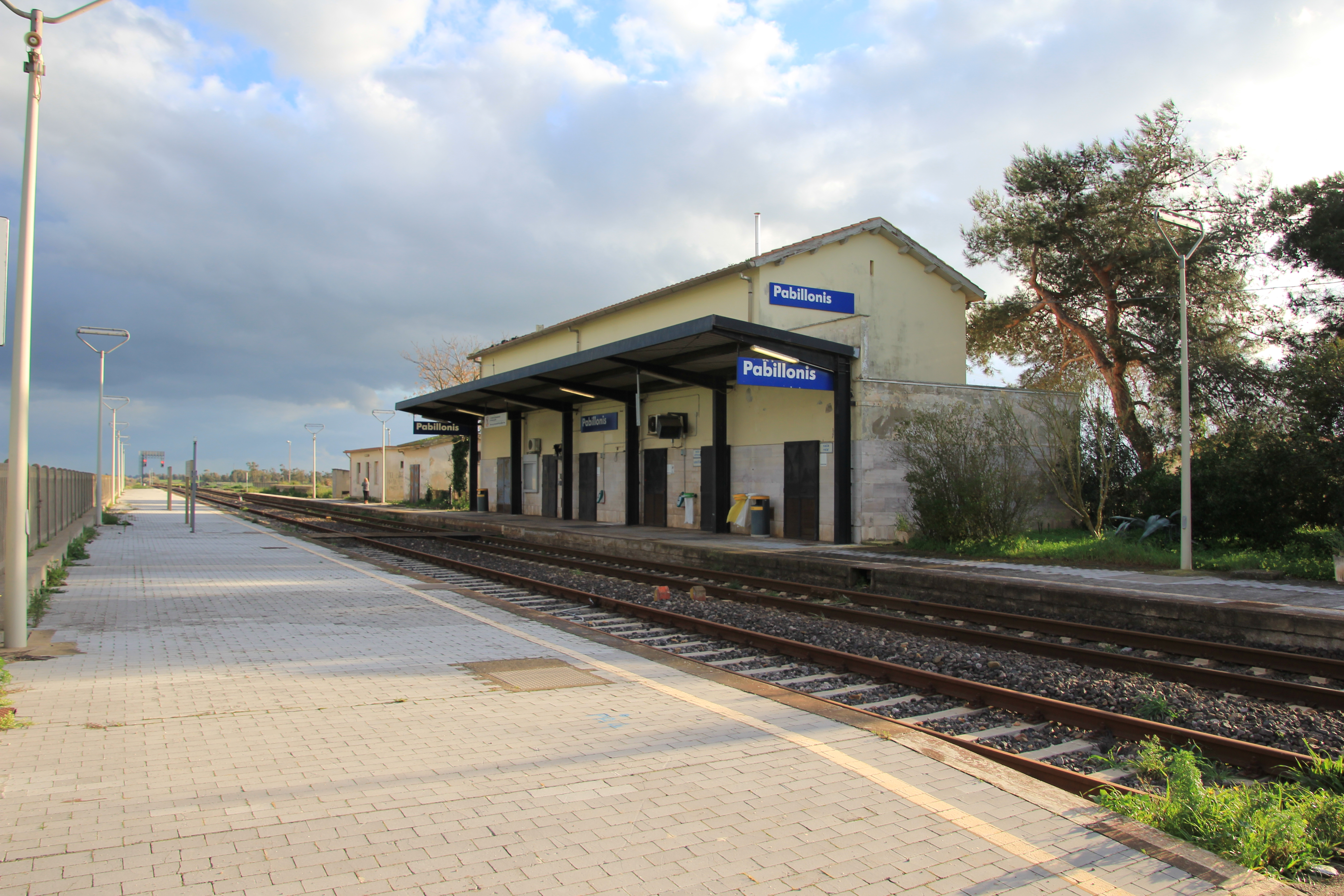
The train station in Pabillonis, closed to the public since June 2014

Since 1872, Pabillonis has had a railway station along the Dorsale Sarda, run by RFI, but since June 2014 it has no longer been authorised to provide passenger services. Since then, the people of Pabillonis have been using passenger trains at San Gavino station.

== Bibliography ==
- Dizionario storico-geografico dei Comuni della Sardegna (in Italian). Sassari: Carlo Delfino editore. 2006. ISBN 88-7138-430-X.
- Floris, Francesco. Grande Enciclopedia della Sardegna (in Italian). Sassari: Newton&ComptonEditori.
