= Nuraghe =

Ancient type of tower common in Sardinia

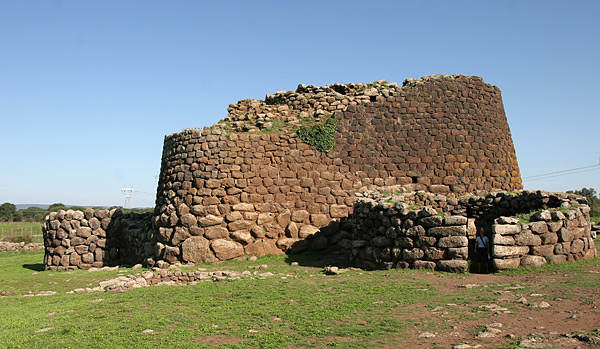
Nuraghe Losa

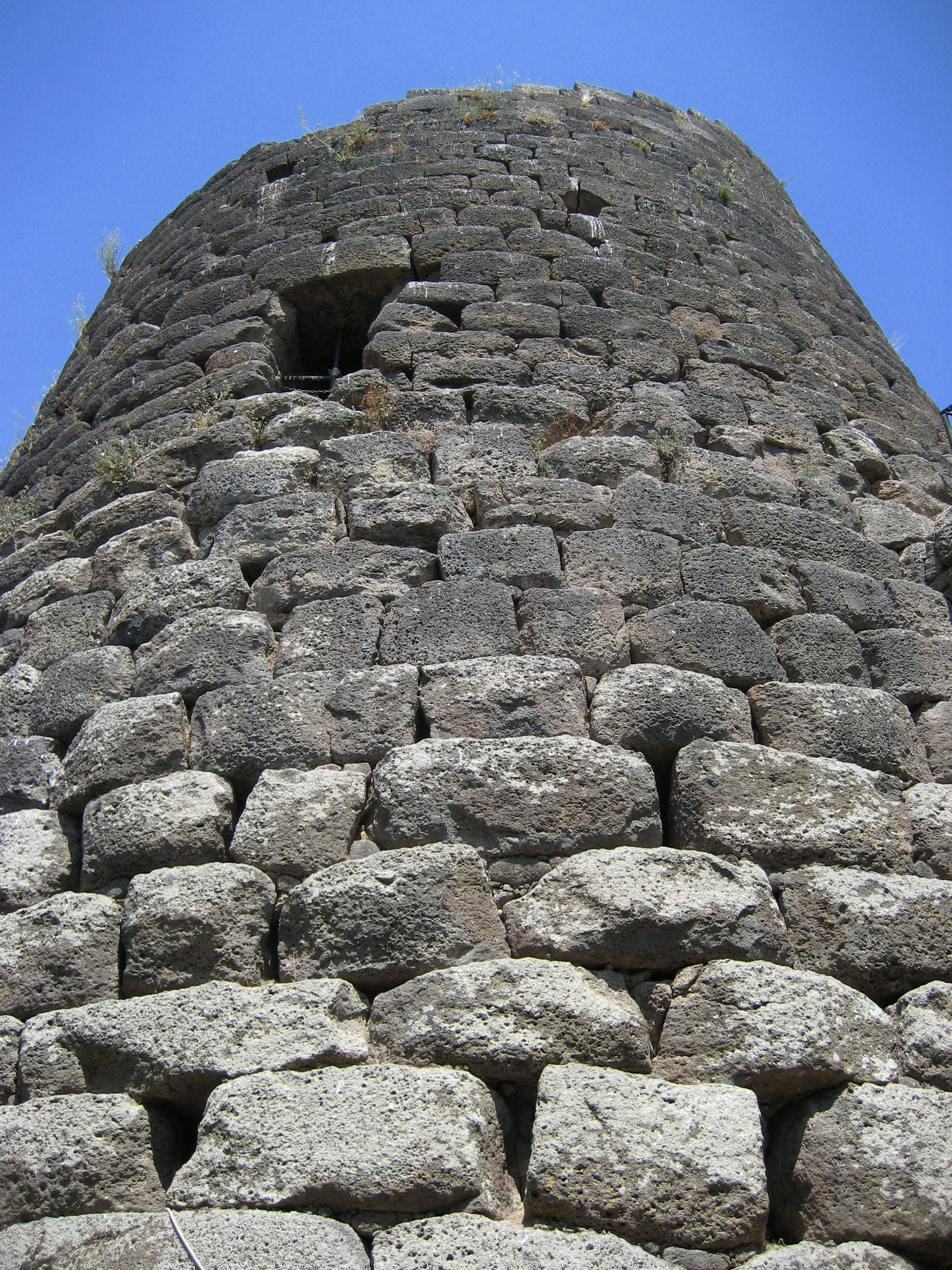
Central tower of the Nuraghe Santu Antine of Torralba

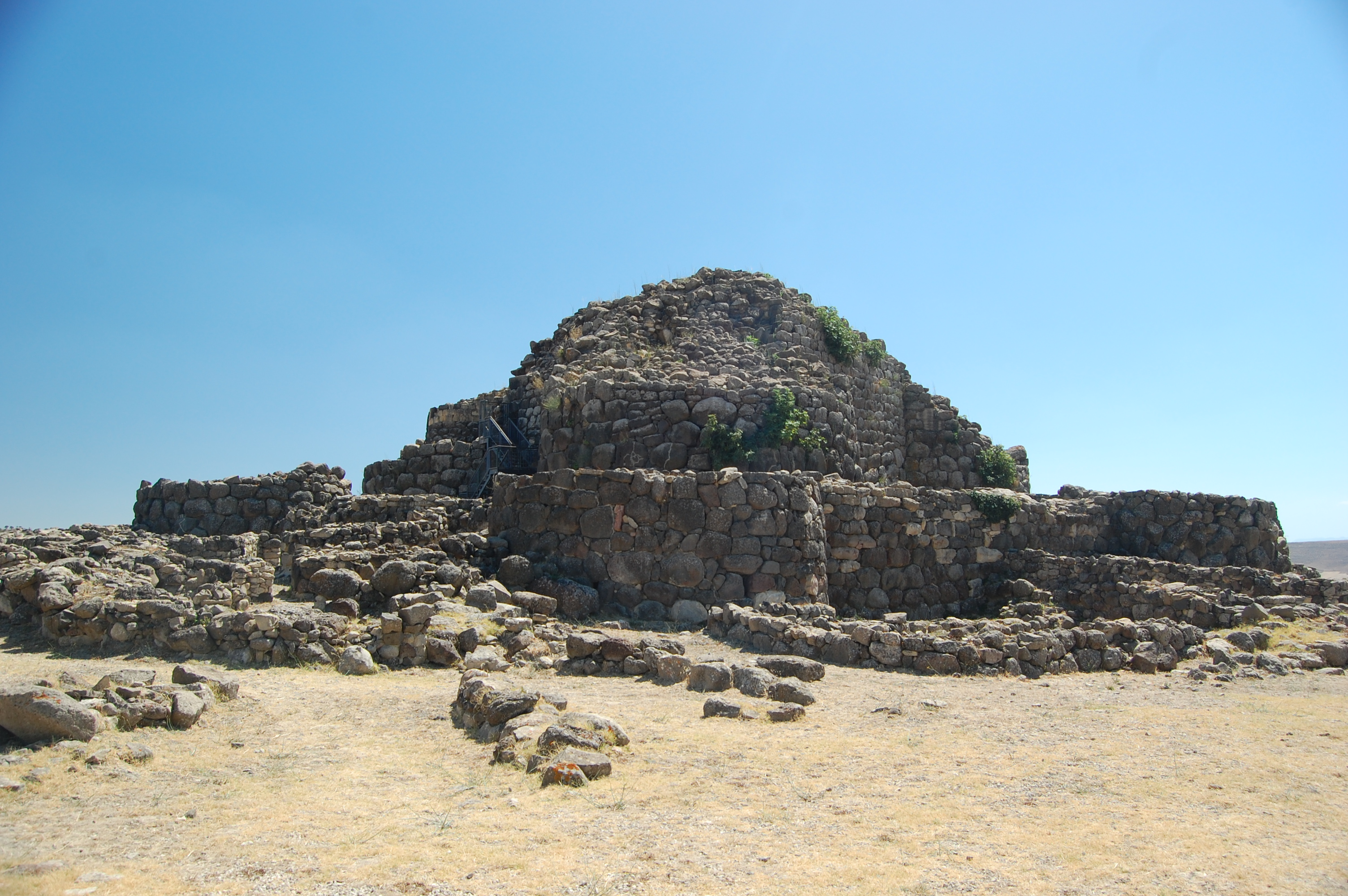
Nuraghe "Su Nuraxi"

The nuraghe, or nurhag, is the main type of ancient megalithic edifice found in Sardinia, Italy, developed during the Nuragic Age between 1900 and 730 BC. Today it has come to be the symbol of Sardinia and its distinctive culture known as the Nuragic civilization. More than 7,000 nuraghes have been found, though archeologists believe that originally there were more than 10,000.

== Etymology ==
Natively, the structure is called a nuraghe (Sardinian: [nuˈɾaɣɛ], Italian: [nuˈraːɡe]; plural: Logudorese Sardinian nuraghes, Campidanese Sardinian nuraxis [nuˈɾaʒizi], Italian nuraghi). According to the Oxford English Dictionary the etymology is "uncertain and disputed": "The word is perhaps related to the Sardinian place names Nurra, Nurri, Nurru, and to Sardinian nurra 'heap of stones, cavity in earth' (although these senses are difficult to reconcile). A connection with the Semitic base of Arabic nūr 'light, fire, etc.' is now generally rejected." The Latin word murus ('wall') may be related to it, being a result of the derivation: murus–*muraghe–nuraghe. However, such theories are debated.

An etymological theory suggests a Proto-Basque origin by the term *nur (stone) with the common -ak plural ending; the Paleo-Sardinian suffix -ake is also found in some Indo-European languages such as Latin and Greek. Another possible explanation is that the term nuraghe came from the name of the Iberian mythological hero Norax, and the root *nur would be an adaptation of the Indo-European root *nor.

Density map of nuraghes on Sardinia per km^{2}.

== General layout ==
The typical nuraghe is situated in areas where previous prehistoric Sardinian cultures had been distributed, that is, not far from alluvial plains (though few nuraghes appear in plains currently as they were destroyed by human activities such as agriculture, dams, and road building) and has the outer shape of a truncated conical tower, thus resembling a Medieval tower, with a tholos-like vault inside.

The structure's walls consist of three components: an outer layer (tilted inwards and made of many layers of stones whose size diminishes with increasing height: mostly, lower layers consist of rubble masonry, while upper layers tend to be of ashlar masonry); an inner layer, made of smaller stones (to form a corbelled dome of the bullet-shaped tholos type, and where ashlar masonry is used more frequently); and an intermediate layer of very small pieces and soil, which makes the whole construction very sturdy. It stands only by virtue of the weight of its stones, which may each amount to several tons. Some nuraghes are about 20 metres (65 ft) in height, the tallest one known, Nuraghe Arrubiu, reached a height of 25–30 metres (80–100 ft).

The entrance leads into a corridor, on whose sides are often open niches. The corridor leads to the round chamber. A spiral stone stair, leading to upper floors (if present) and/or to a terrace, was built within the thick walls and it was illuminated by embrasures. The Nuragic towers might have as much as three corbel chambers, one on top of the other. In complex nuraghes, corridors were often present, sometimes corbelled, such as at Santu Antine, in which the corbelled arch corridors were superimposed on two levels, and reached a length of 27 metres (89 ft).

Today fewer than 7,000 nuraghes remain standing; their number was originally larger. Nuraghes are most prevalent in the northwest and south-central parts of the island.

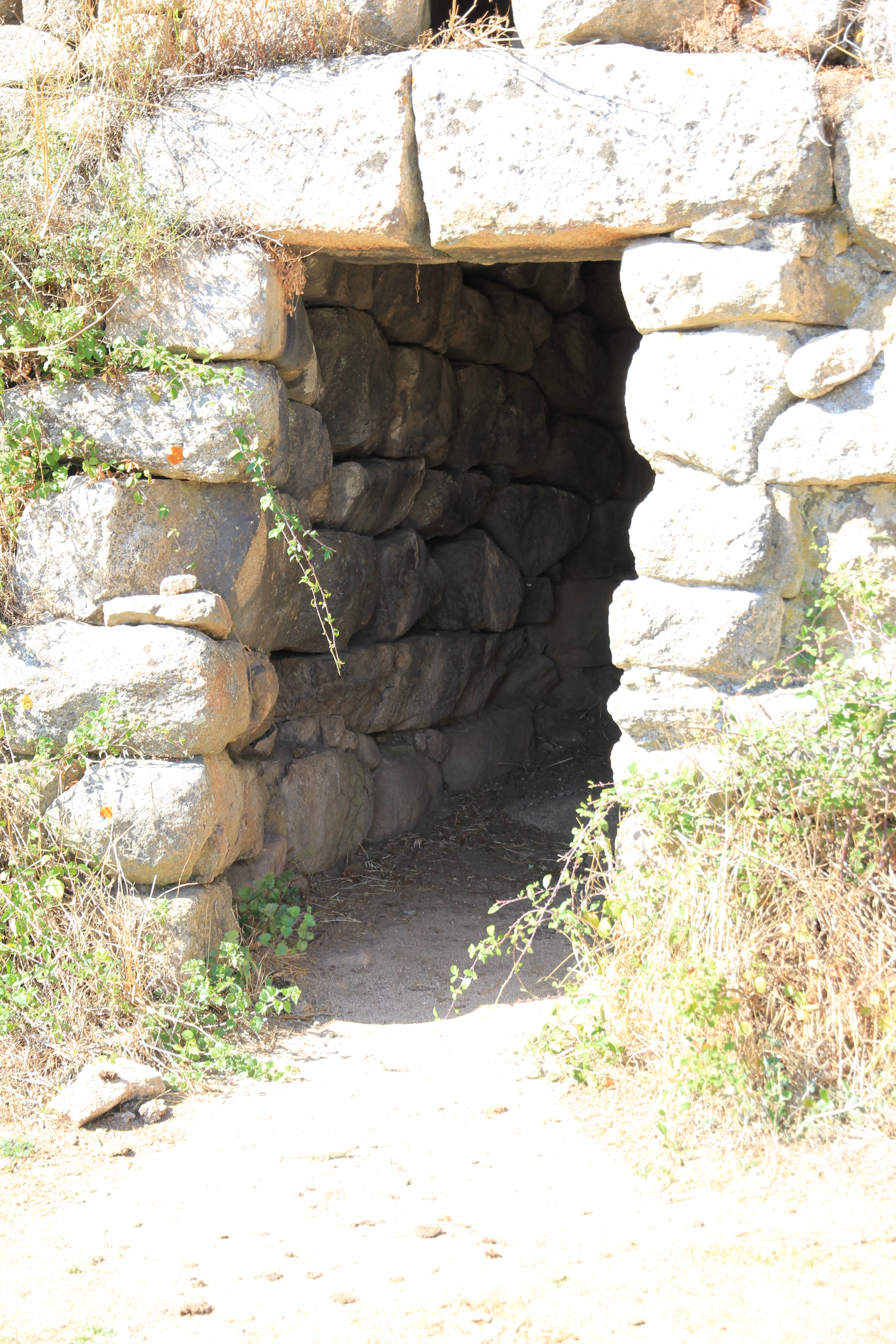
Access

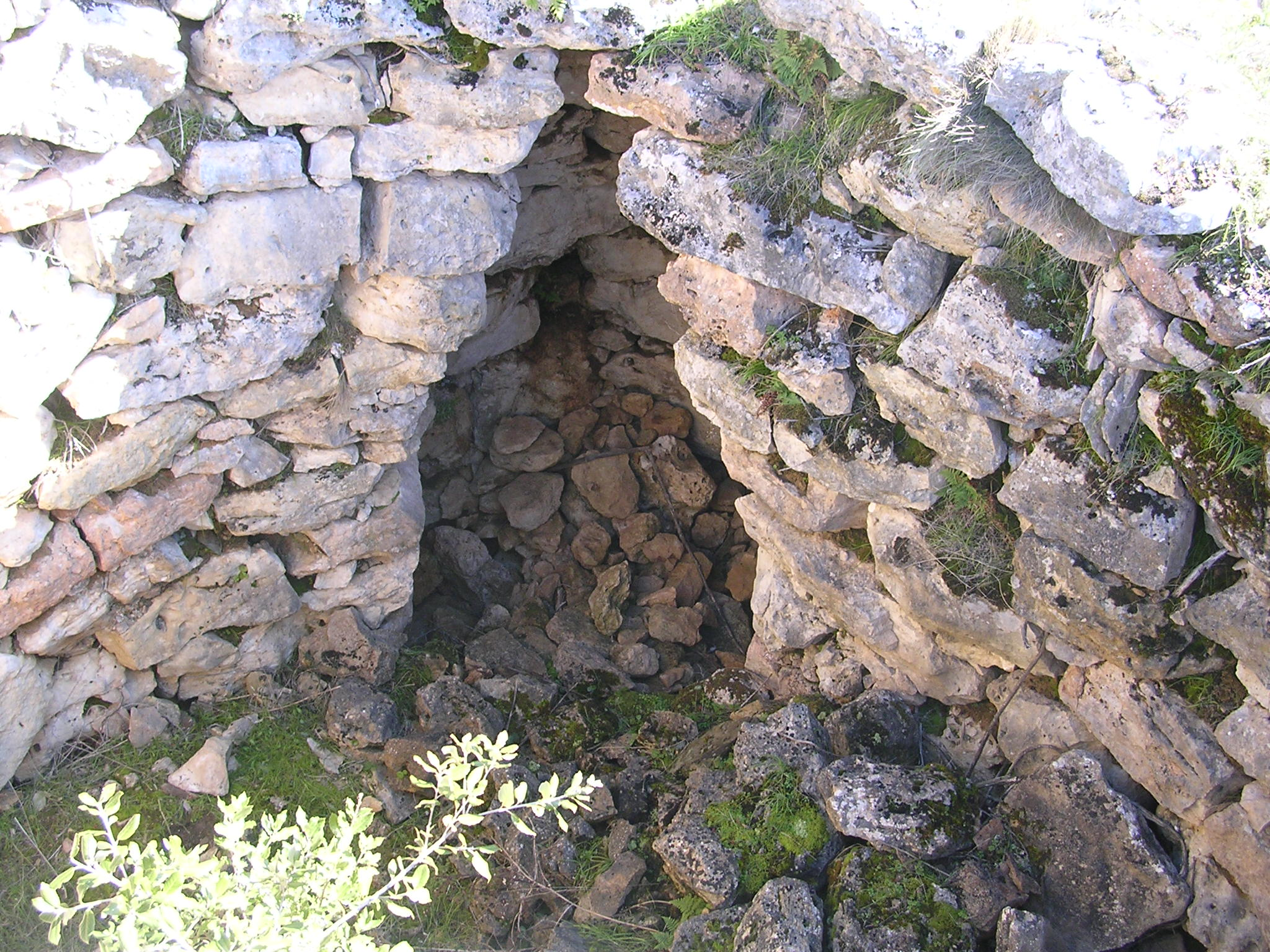
Niche of the central chamber

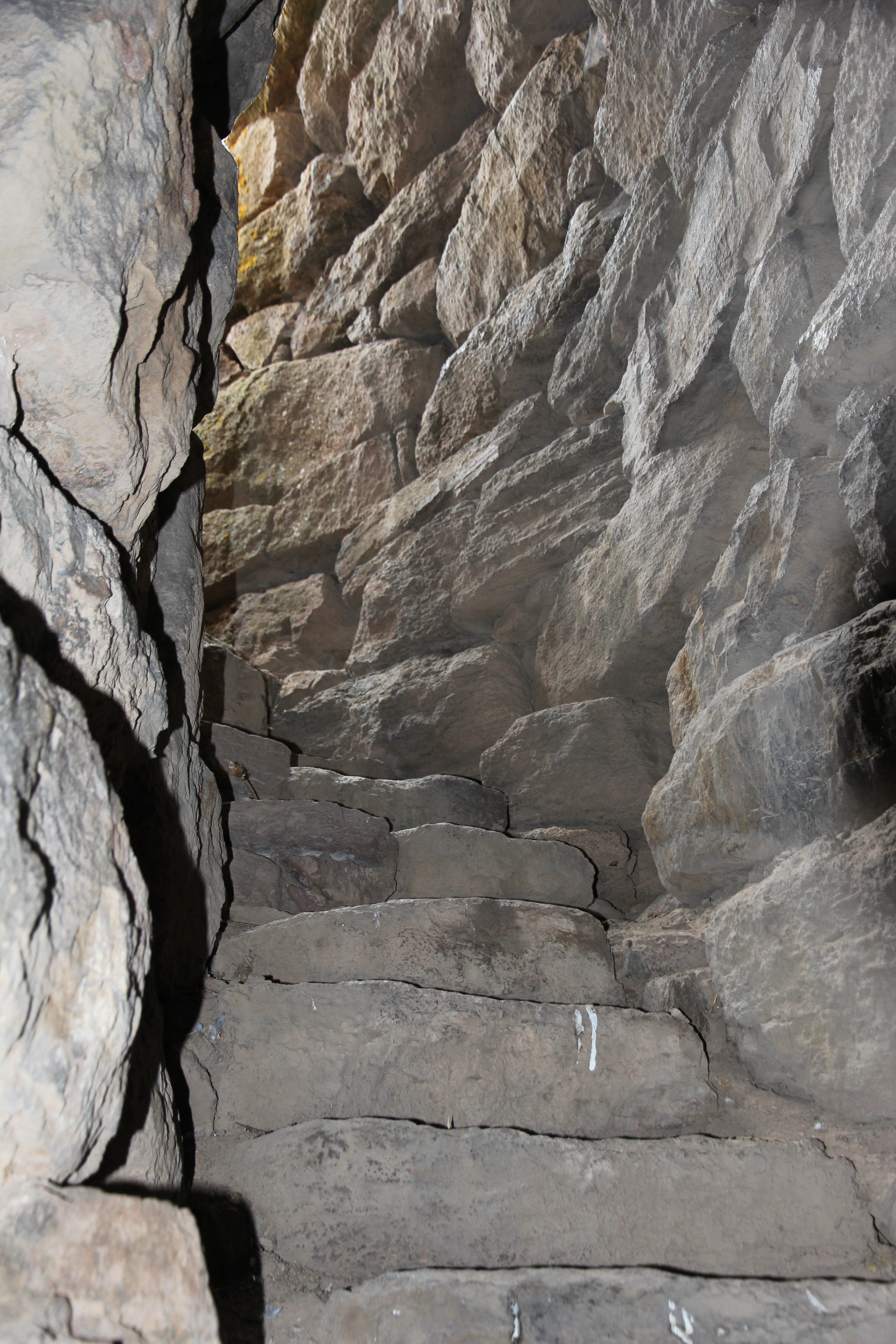
Stairwell

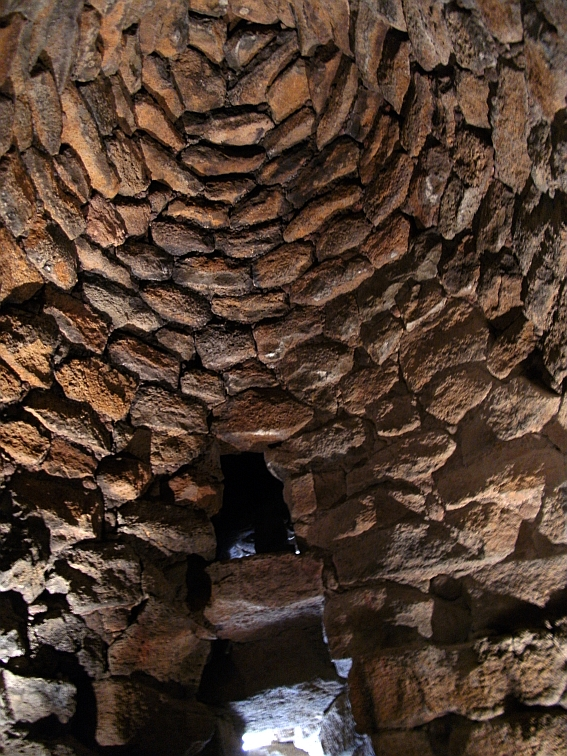
Tholos of Sant'Antine nuraghe

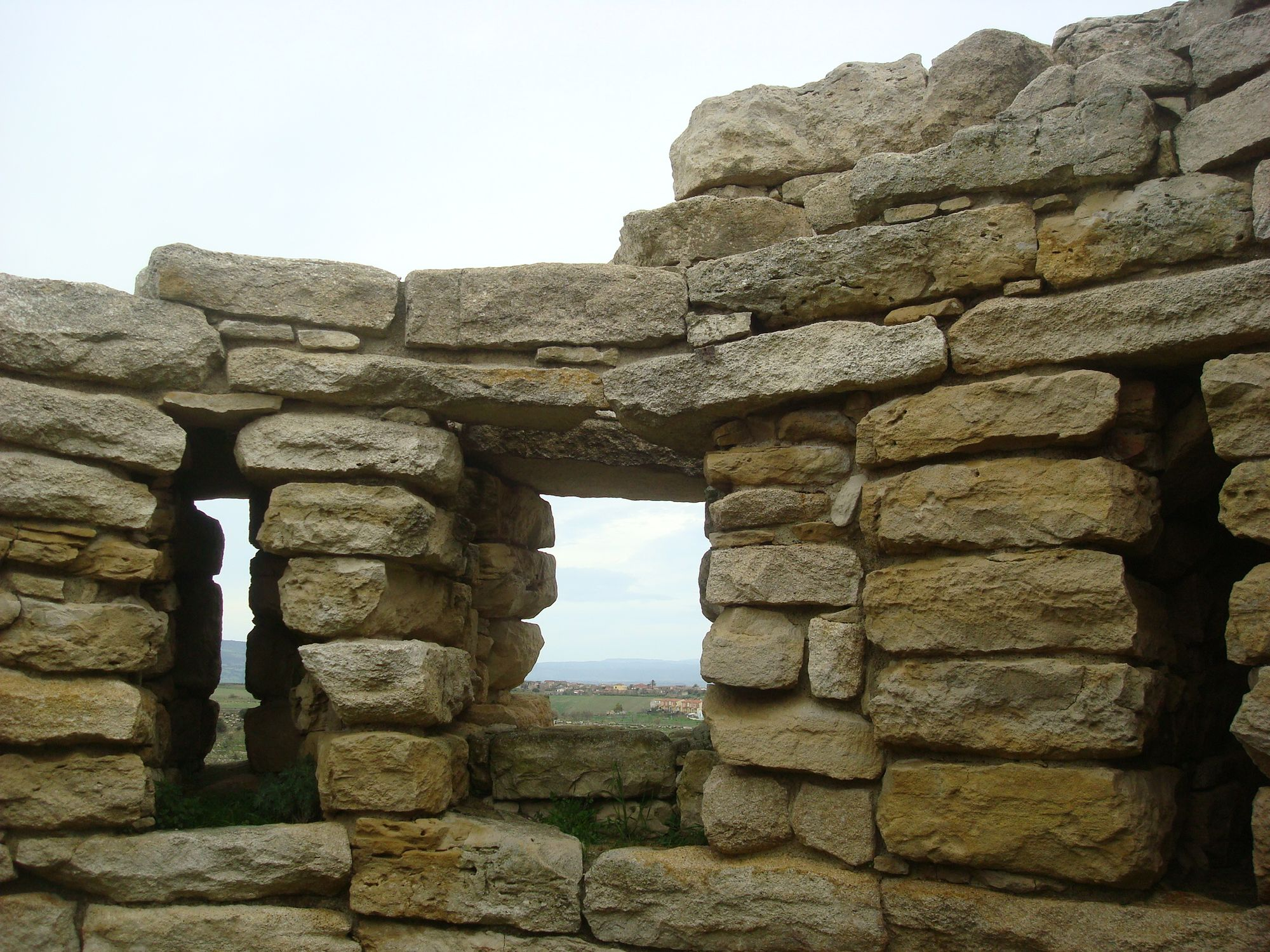
Window and embrasures

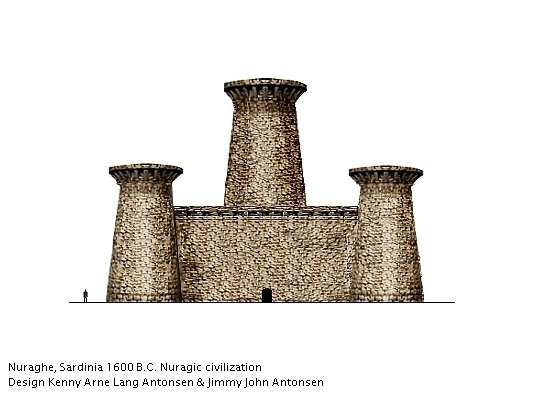
Reconstruction of a nuraghe from 1600 B.C.

== Function ==
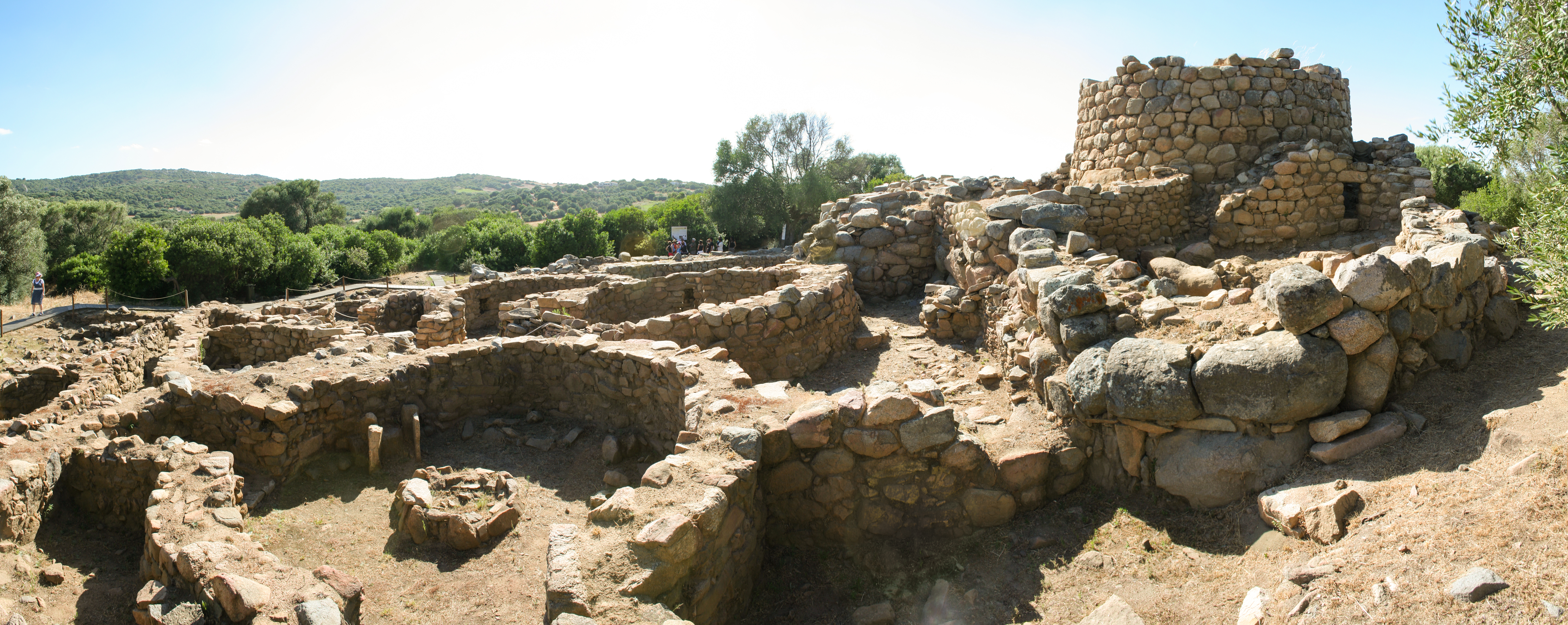
Nuraghe La Prisciona, Nuraghe village near Arzachena, Sardinia

There is no consensus on the function of the nuraghes: they could have been rulers' residences, military strongholds, meeting halls, religious temples, ordinary dwellings or a combination of any of these things. Some of the nuraghes are, however, located in strategic places – such as hills – from which important passages could be easily controlled. They might have been something between a "status symbol" and a "passive defence" building, meant to be a deterrent for possible enemies.

Nuraghes could also have been the "national" symbol of the Nuragic peoples. Small-scale models of nuraghe have often been excavated at religious sites (e.g. in the "maze" temple at the Su Romanzesu site near Bitti in central Sardinia). Nuraghes may have just connoted wealth or power, or they may have been an indication that a site had its owners. Recent unconfirmed theories tend to suggest that Sardinian towns were independent entities (such as the city-states, although in a geographical sense they were not cities) that formed federations and that the building of these monuments might have depended on agreed-on distributions of territory among federated unities.

They were not tombs of princes and their families, as was mistakenly believed by taking as an argument the discovery of human remains there, but of strata of a later age than the Nuragic, that is, Carthaginian and Roman. Neither were they monumental temples, which today are known to be of different shapes and types, even for prehistoric island times, likewise burials (domus de janas or "fairy houses"; tumbas de sos gigantes or "tombs of the giants").

In 2002, Juan Belmonte and Mauro Zedda measured the entrance orientations (declinations and azimuths) of 272 simple nuraghes and of the central towers of 180 complex ones. The data revealed clear peaks corresponding to orientations pointing to the sunrise at winter solstice and to the Moon at its southernmost rising position. These alignments remained constant throughout the history of nuraghe. The most common declinations revealed were of around −43° for the earlier nuraghes, shifting to just −45½° for the later. Zedda has suggested that the target is likely a star, quite possibly Alpha Centauri.

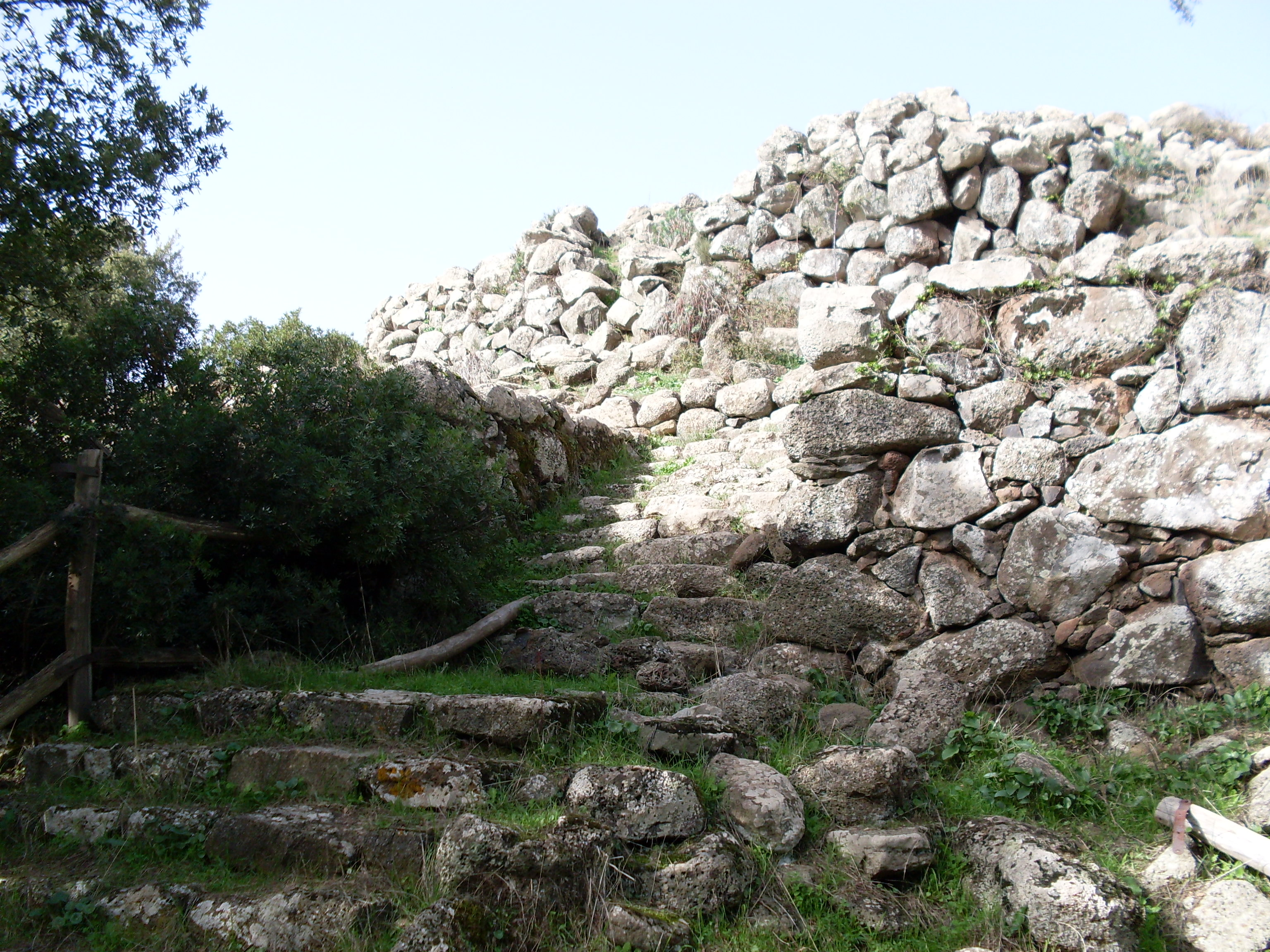
Protonuraghe Bruncu Madugui, Gesturi

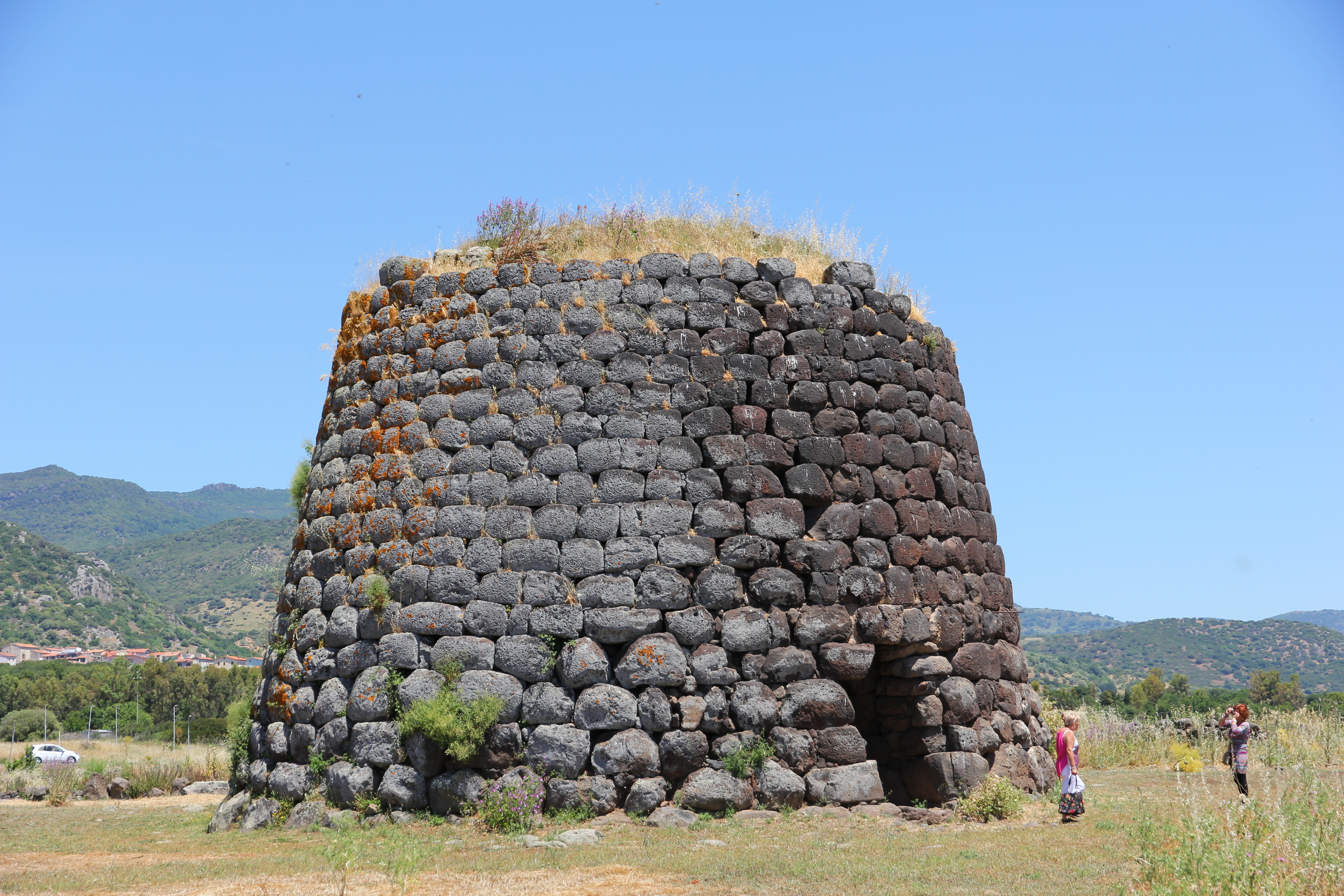
Nuraghe di Santa Sabina, from Silanus, an example of a monotower nuraghe.

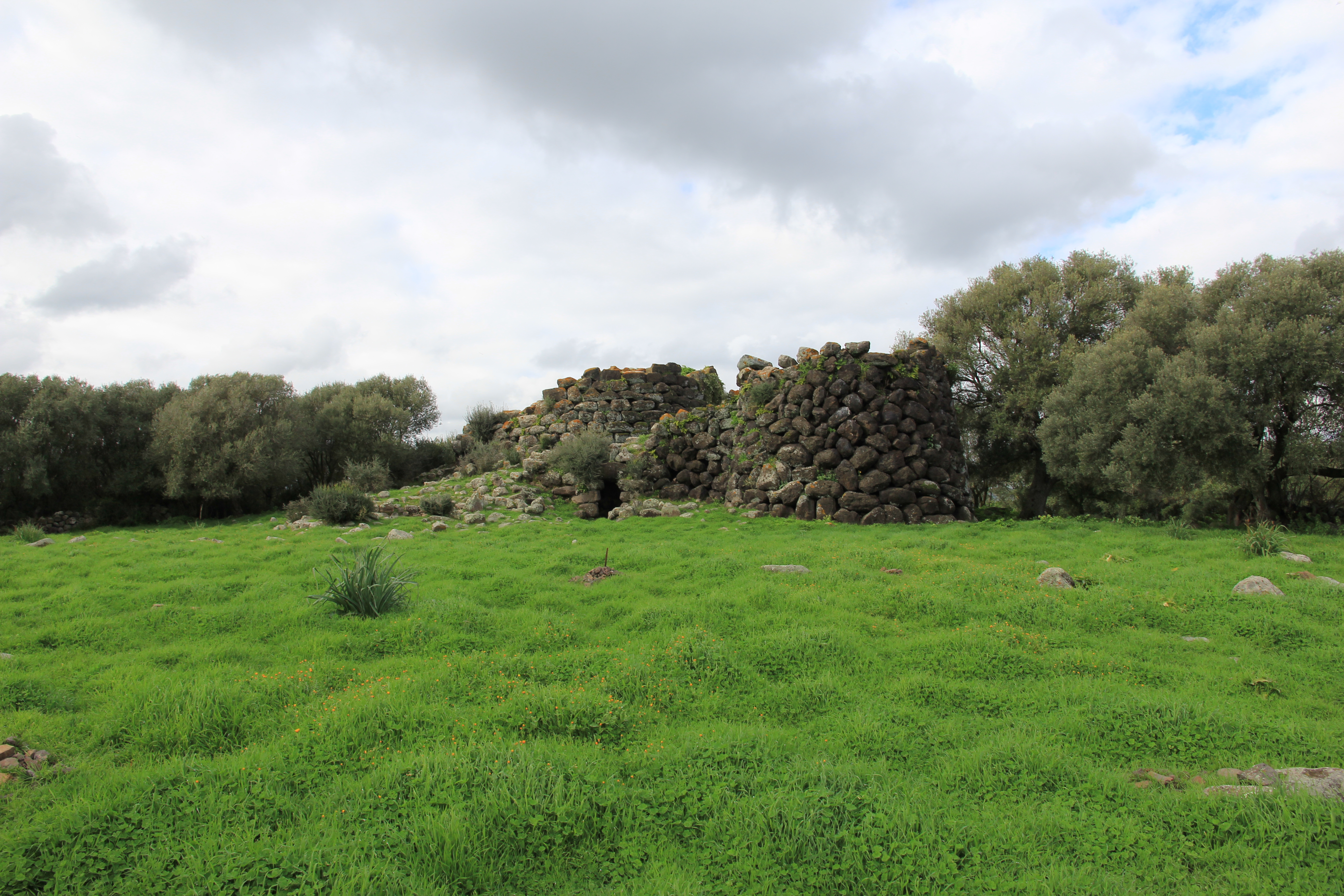
Nuraghe Santa Barbara, Villanova Truschedu, an example of a tancadu nuraghe.

== Types ==
=== Protonuraghe ===
Protonuraghes are considered to be the most archaic type; they differ somewhat from the "classical" (tholos-vaulted) nuraghes in their stockier look. Protonuraghes generally follow an irregular plan and lack the large circular room present in presumed later forms; instead, they are laid out along one or more corridors or long rooms. Although lacking the central circular room, they are sometimes similar in size to later nuraghes.

=== Mixed nuraghe ===
This type is distinguished by the restorations made in later times, supposedly because of a change to the protonuraghes design, or for other needs.

=== Single-tower nuraghe ===
This is considered to be the predominant type of nuraghe, and it represents the most diffused typology. The single tower, of a truncated conical shape, contains one or more superimposed chambers, covered by a tholos-shaped chamber. The access, generally located at the ground level, leads into a passageway that leads, in the front, into the central chamber and in one side (usually the left) in the helical staircase, built inside the wall mass, that lead to the terrace or to the upper-floor chamber.

In addition to the usual circular rooms, in their inside can be found other smaller environments such as niches.

=== A "tancadu" nuraghe ===
A "tancadu" nuraghe (Sardinian term for courtyard) represents the evolution of the single-tower nuraghe; another circular building was later added to the main tower, with two enclosing curtain walls connecting the two. A courtyard was present within the structure, sometimes provided with a well.

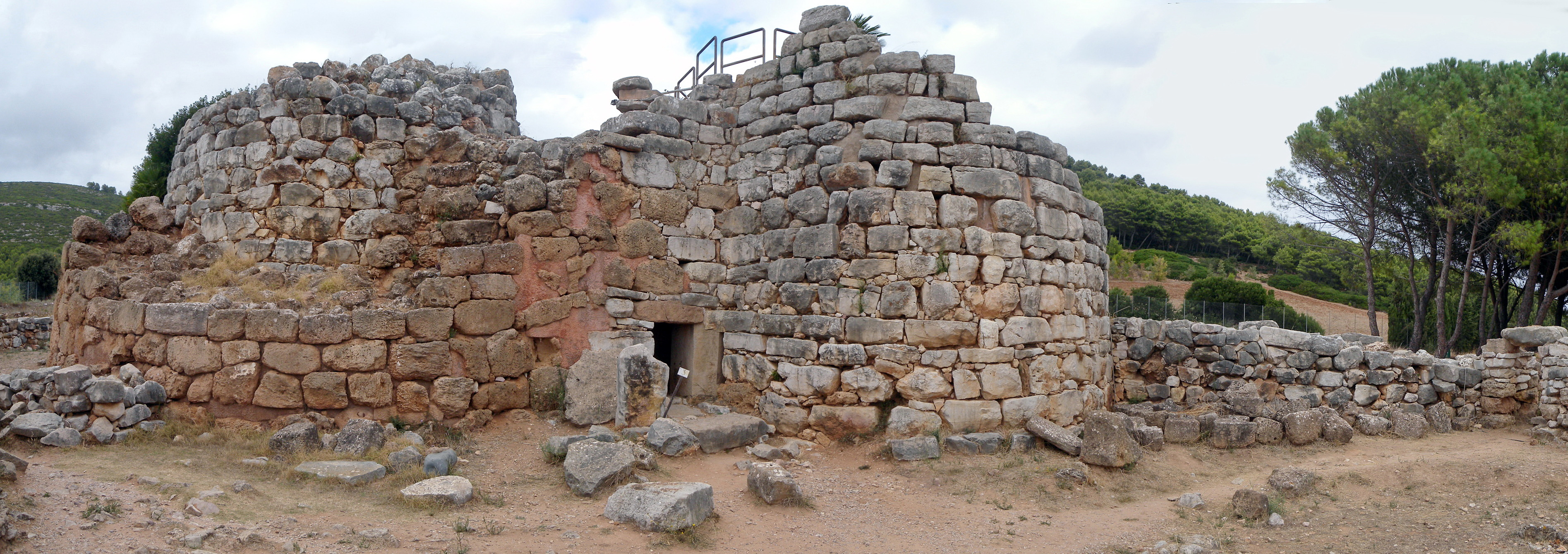
Nuraghe Palmavera, Alghero

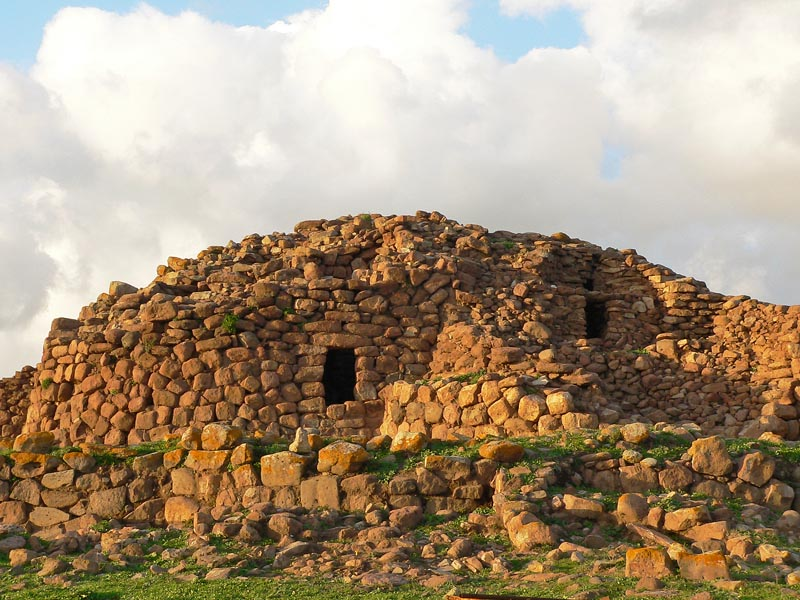
Nuraghe Seruci, Gonnesa

=== Polylobed nuraghe ===
Also called Nuragic royal palaces, the polylobed nuraghes are the least frequent typology. Very elaborate and often designed in a unified manner, they look like veritable fortresses with several towers linked by high ramparts, whose function was to offer more useful space and perhaps to reinforce the central tower. These "Megalithic castles" were surrounded by additional walls, sometimes also provided with towers (the so-called bulwark).

== Notable nuraghes ==
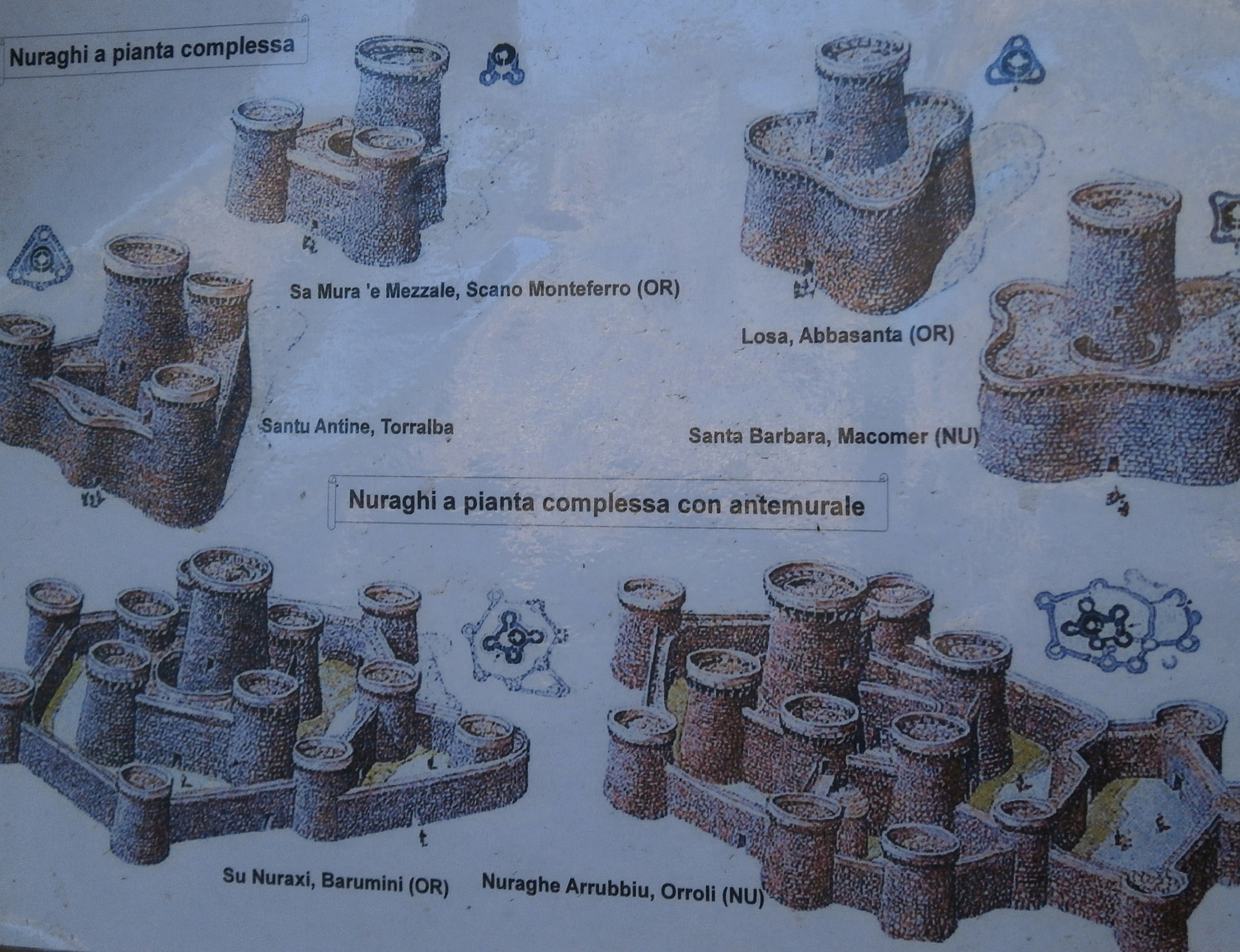
Graphic reconstruction of some complex nuraghes

Nuraghes are inscribed on the UNESCO World Heritage Site list. Su Nuraxi di Barumini, in the south of the island, has been chosen to represent all the nuragic patrimony, but one of the highest and most complex nuraghes is the Nuraghe Santu Antine near the village of Torralba, in northern Sardinia. Other famous nuraghes are near Alghero (Nuraghe Palmavera), Macomer, Abbasanta (see Losa), Orroli (Nuraghe Arrubiu), Gonnesa (Nuraghe Seruci) and Villanovaforru (Nuraghe Genna Maria).

== Date and cultural significance ==
The nuraghes were built between the middle of the Bronze Age (18th–15th centuries BCE) and the Late Bronze Age. The claim that the El-Ahwat structures from Israel might be related has been contested; those are dated to either the 12th or the 11th century BCE. The only buildings widely accepted as being related to nuraghes are the torri (plural of torre) from southern Corsica and the talaiots from Menorca and Mallorca.

According to Massimo Pallottino, an Italian archaeologist specialized in Etruscology, the architecture produced by the Nuragic civilization was the most advanced of any in the western Mediterranean during this epoch, including those in the regions of Magna Graecia. Of the 7,000 extant nuraghes, only a few have been scientifically excavated.

== Image gallery ==
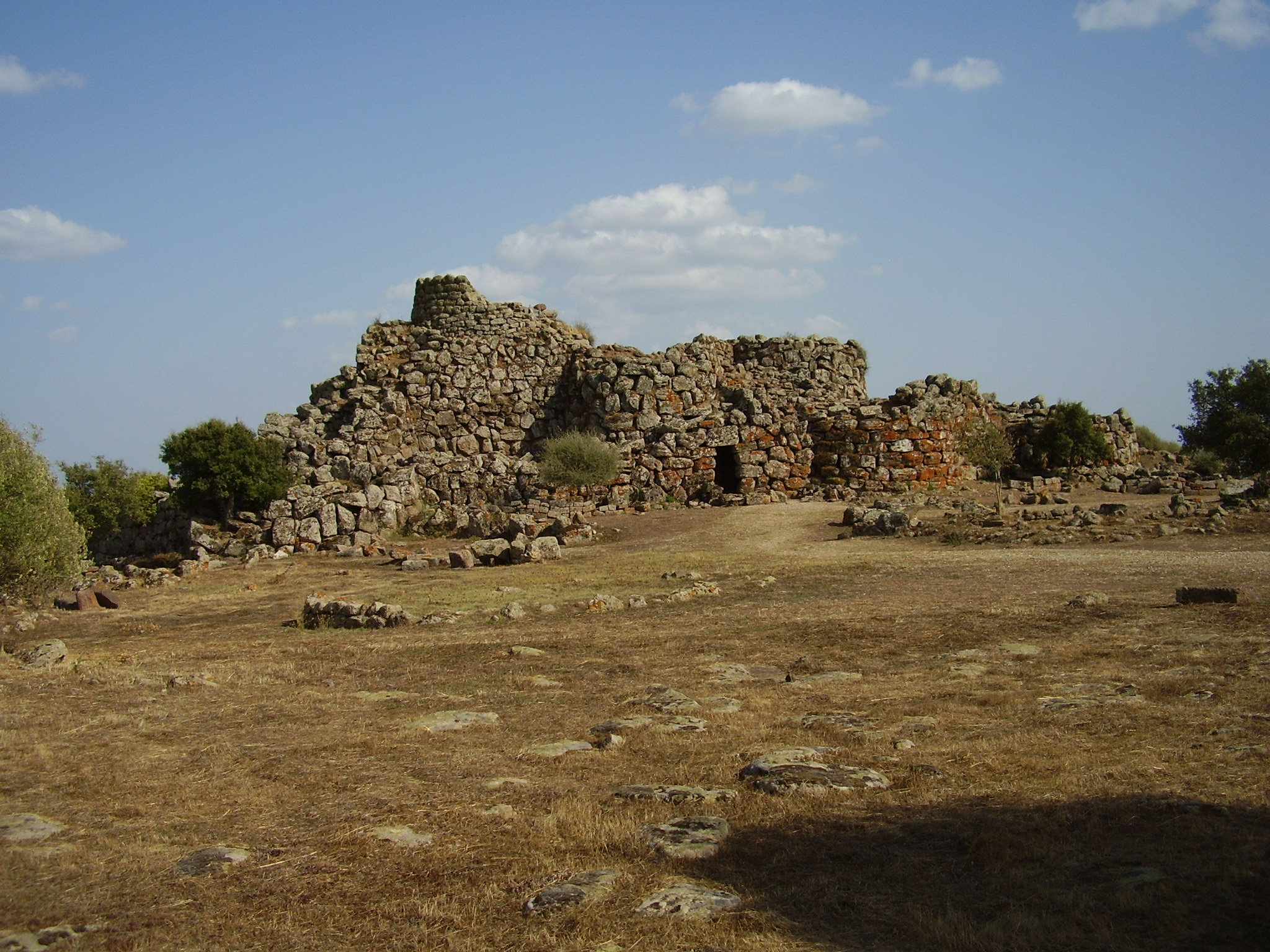
Nuraghe Arrubiu, Orroli

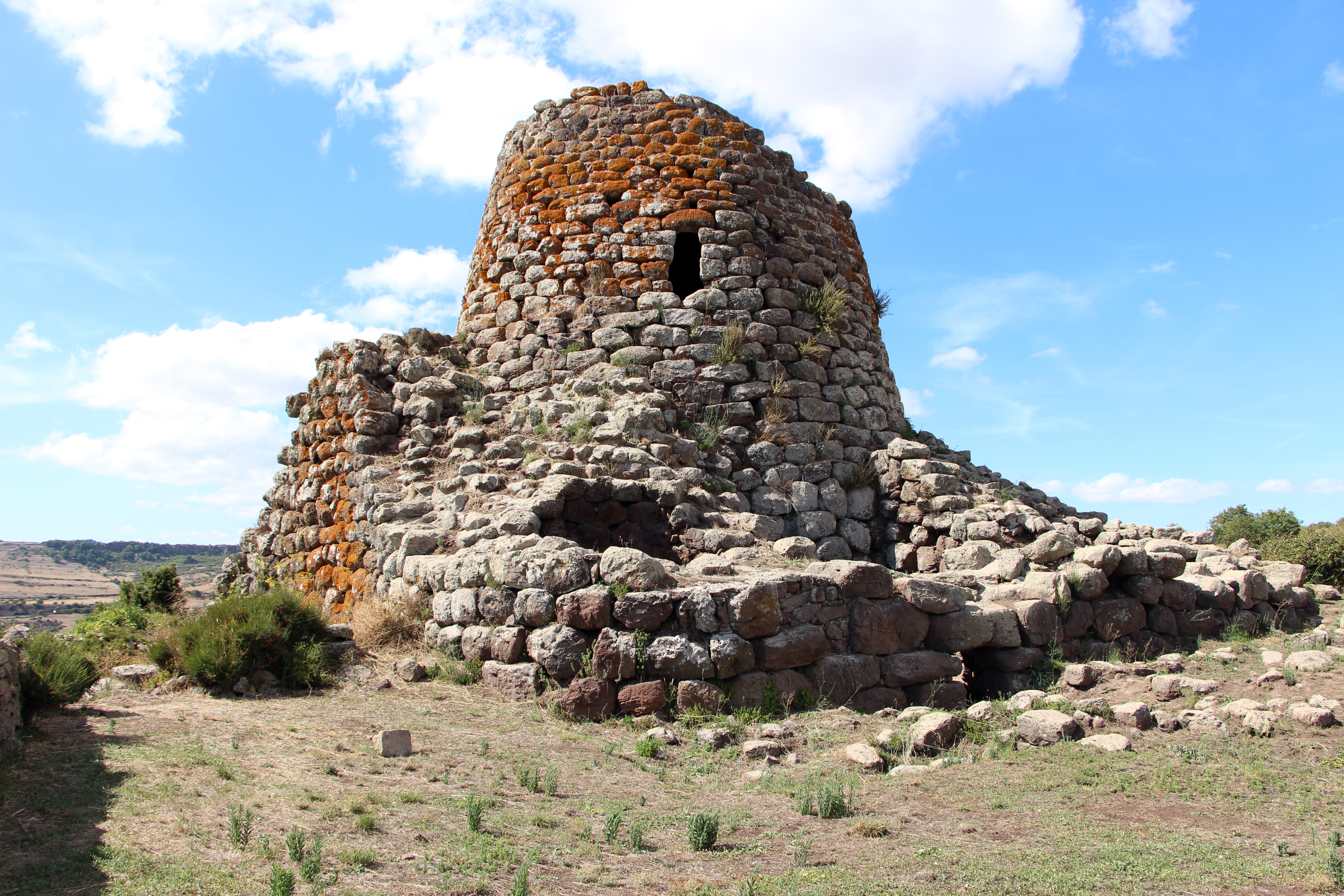
Nuraghe Santa Barbara, Macomer

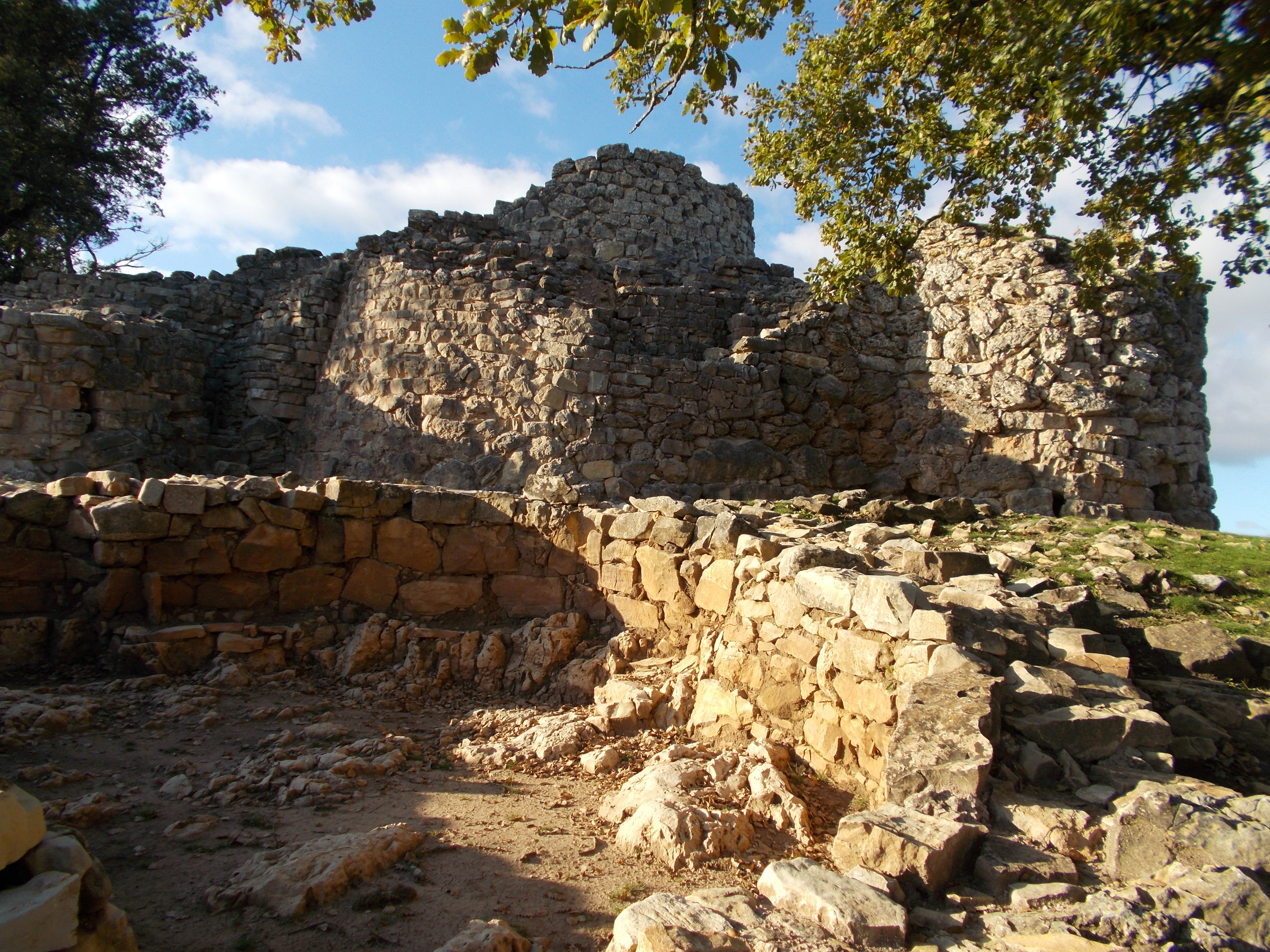
Nuraghe Adoni

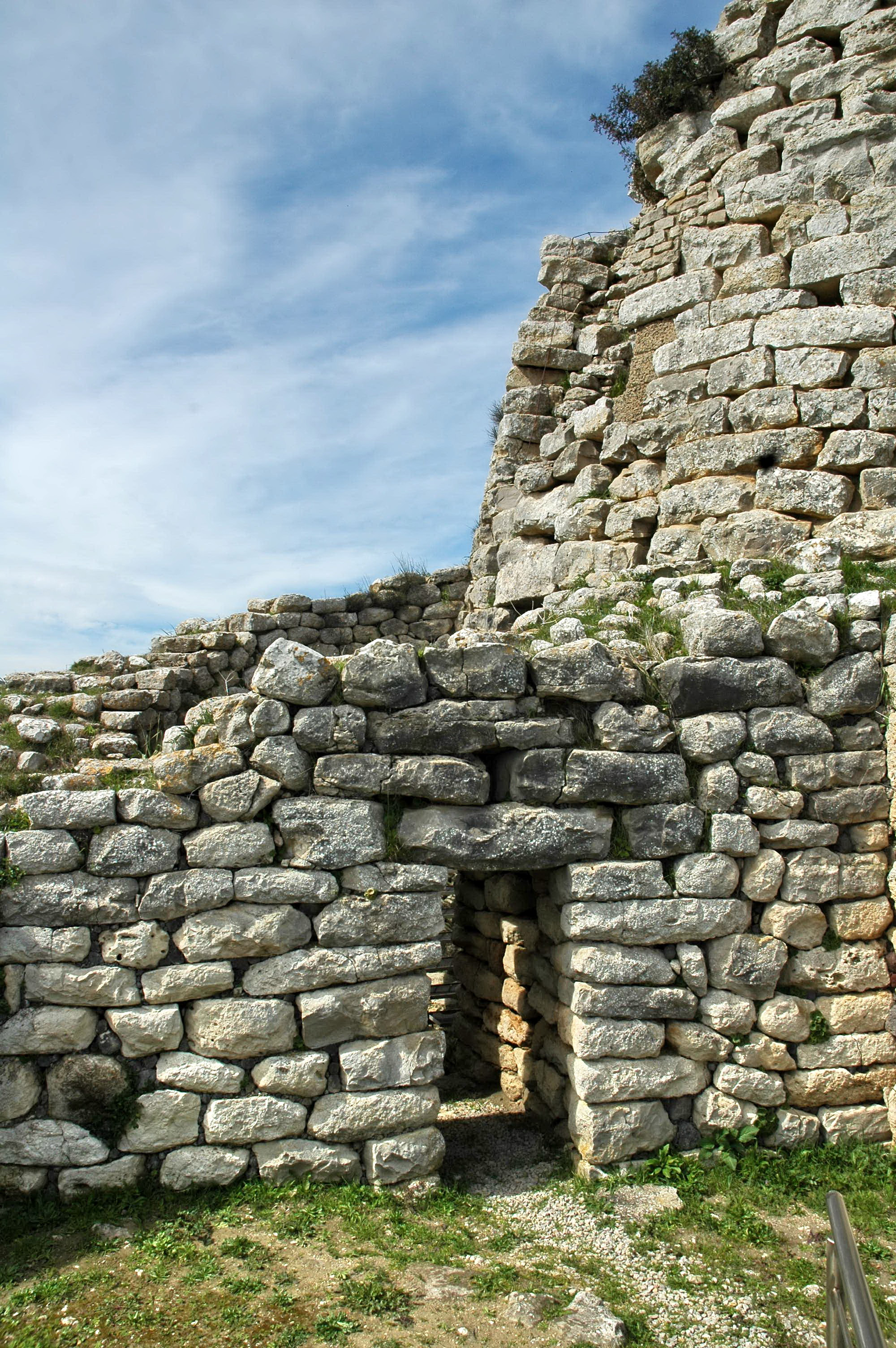
Nuraghe Is Paras

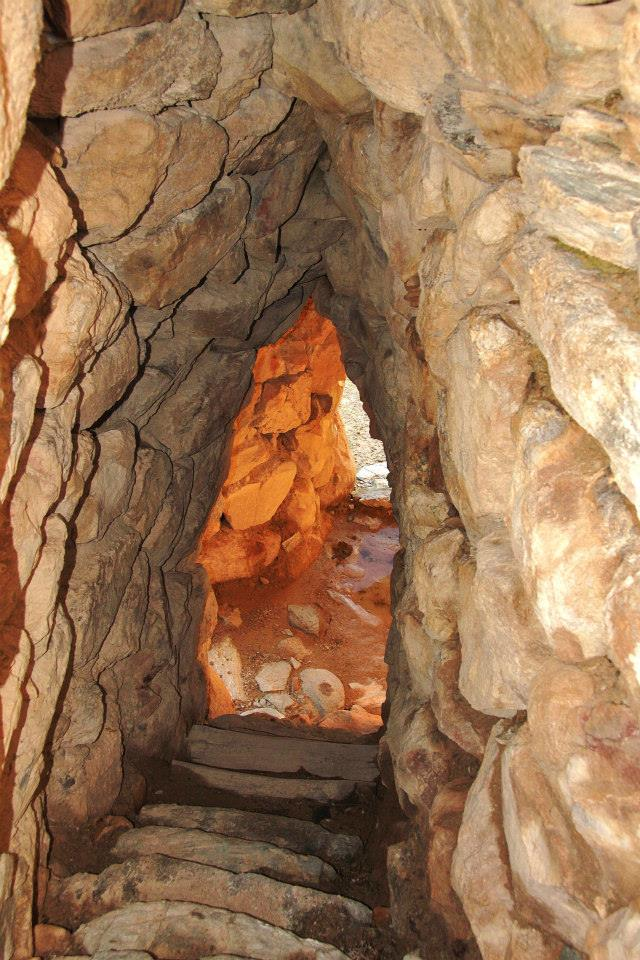
Stairwell inside Nuraghe Nolza

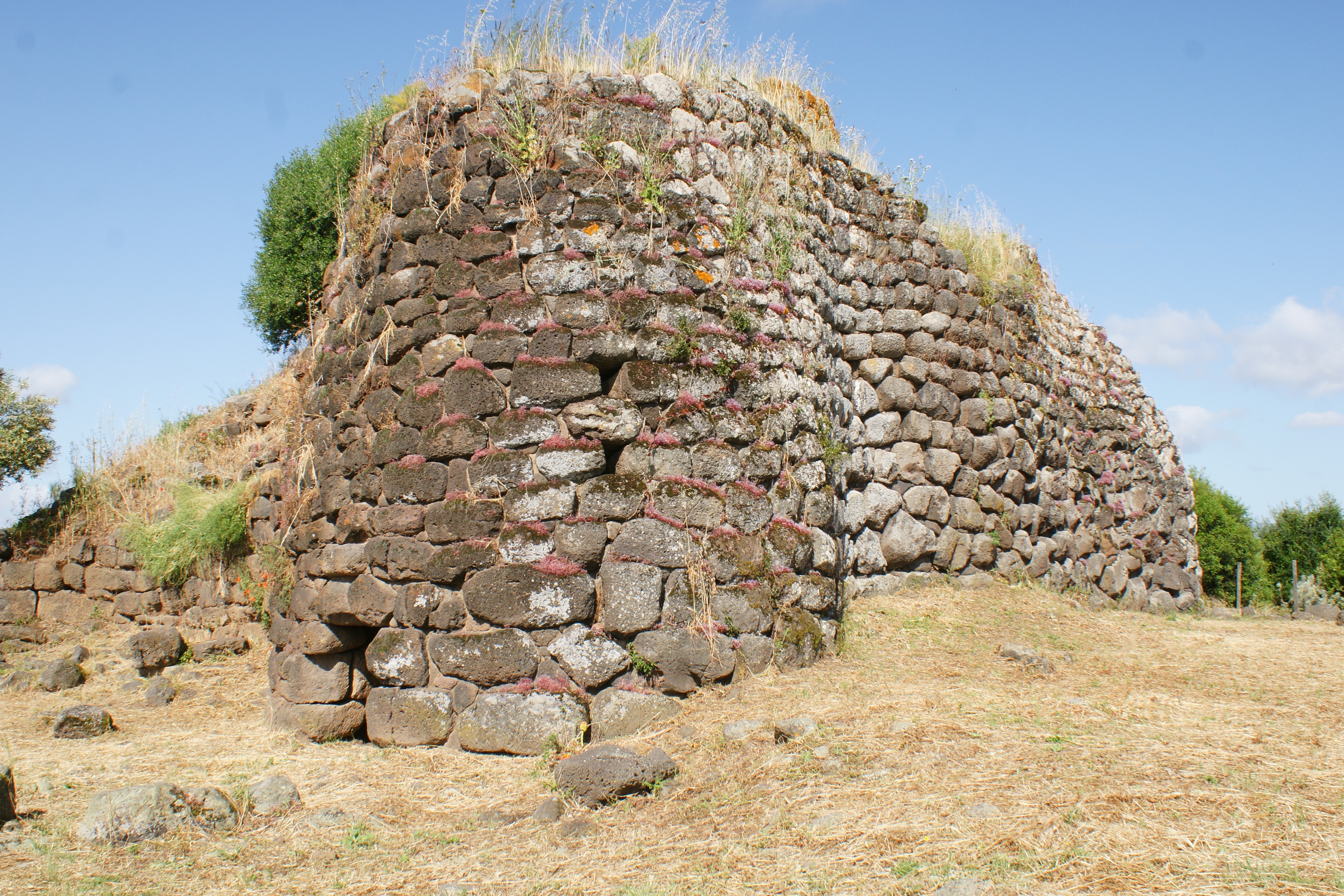
Nuraghe Iloi, Sedilo

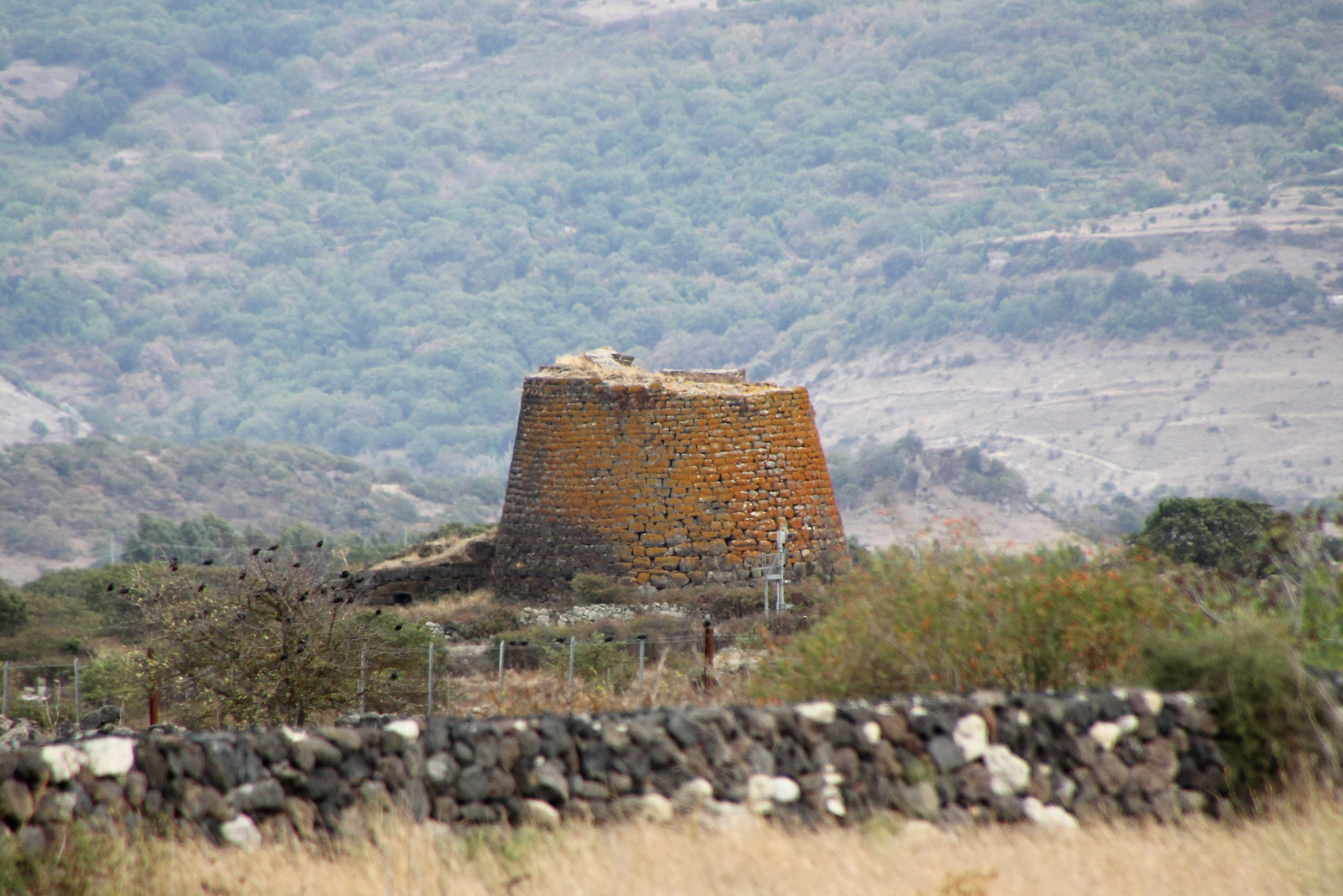
Nuraghe Oes, Giave

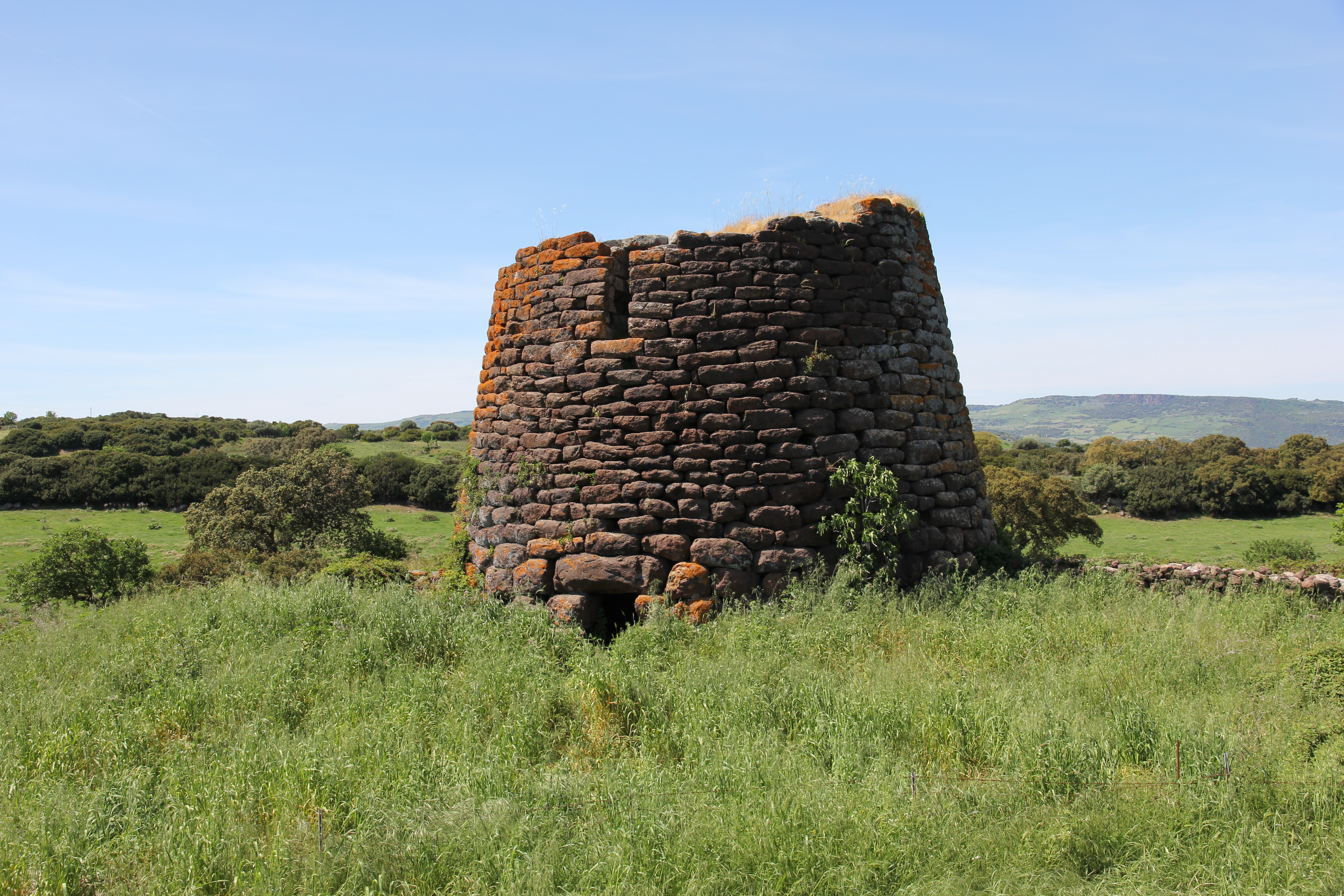
Nuraghe Ruiu, Chiaramonti

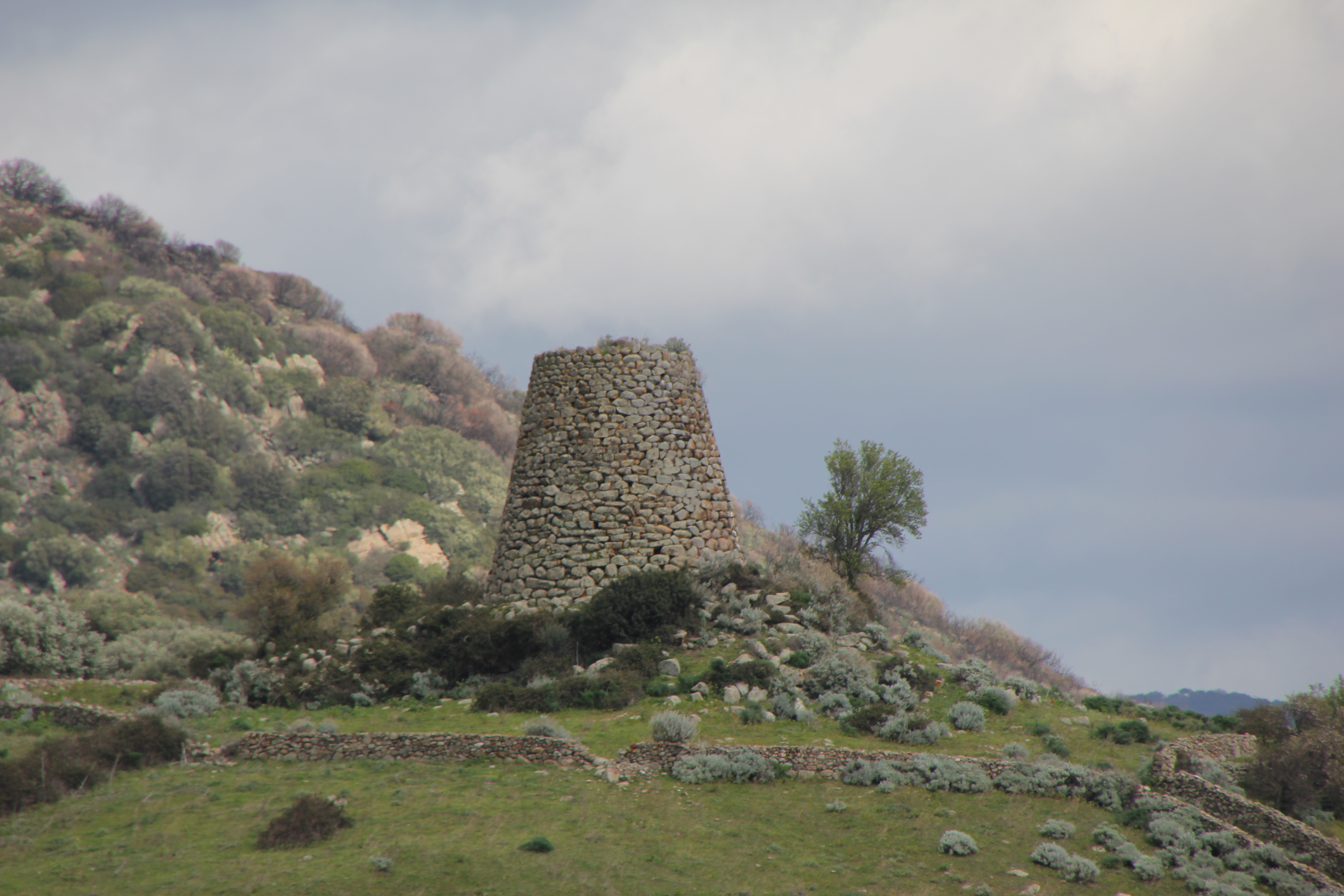
Nuraghe Orolio, Silanus

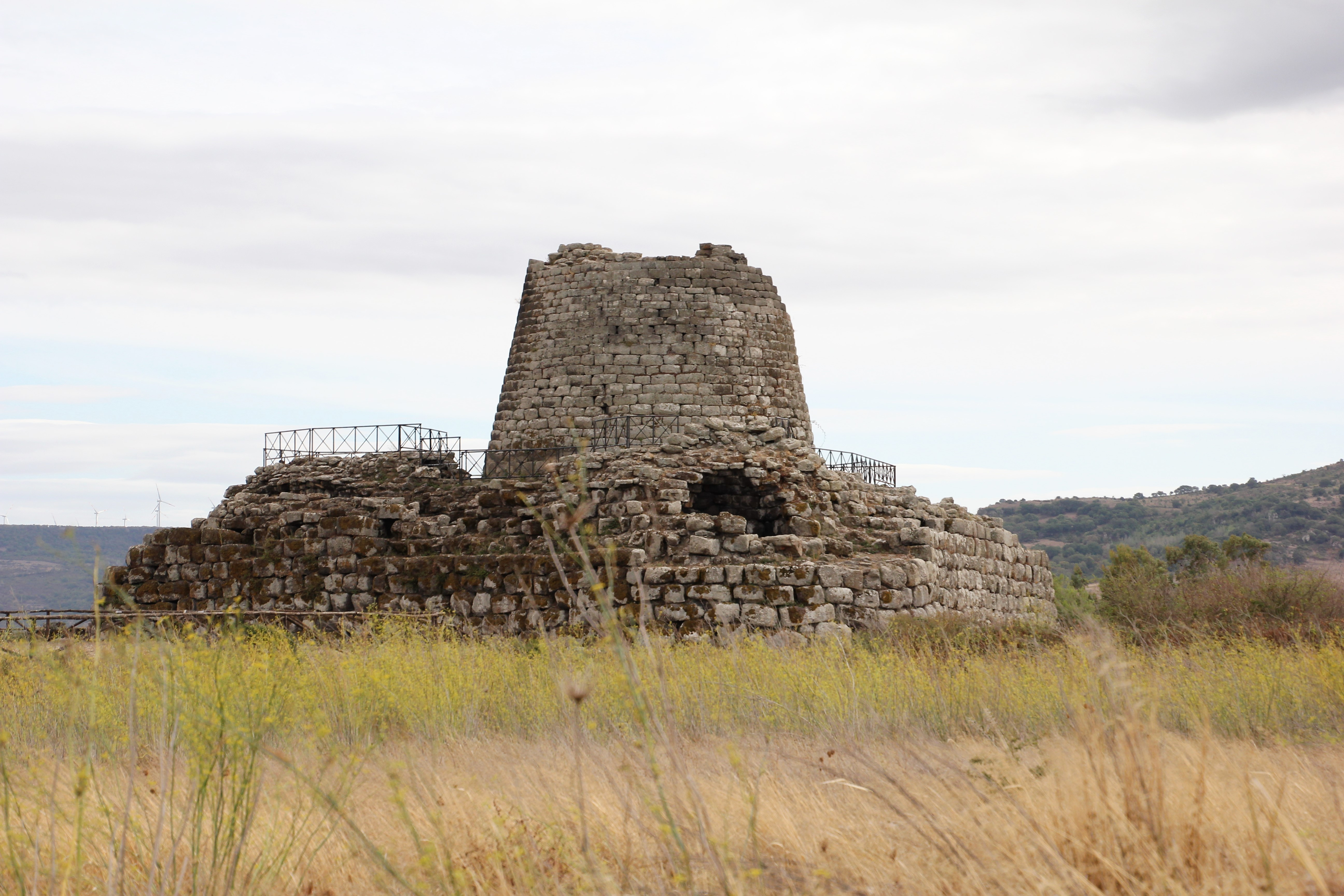
Nuraghe Santu Antine, Torralba

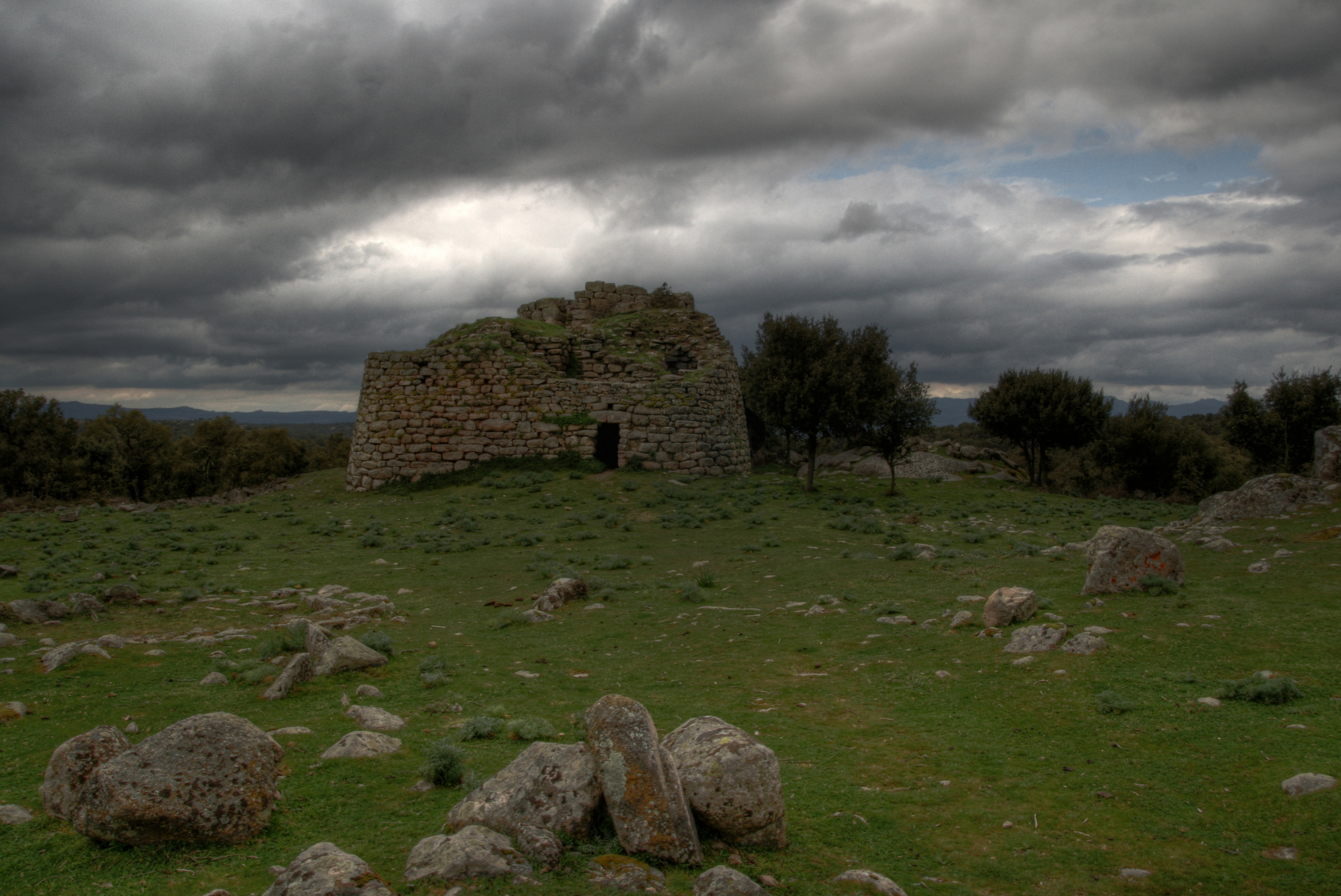
Nuraghe Loelle, Buddusò

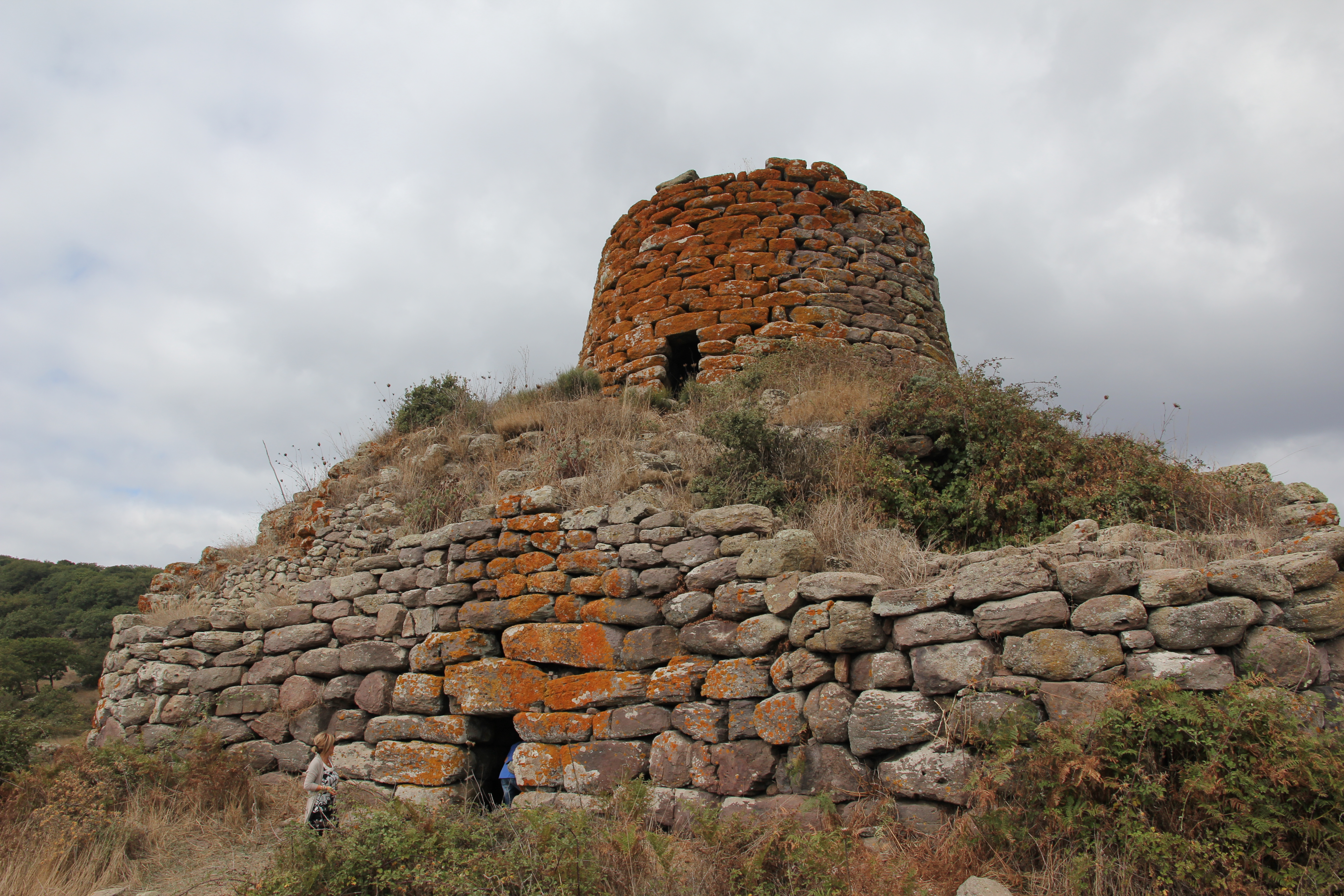
Nuraghe Orolo, Bortigali

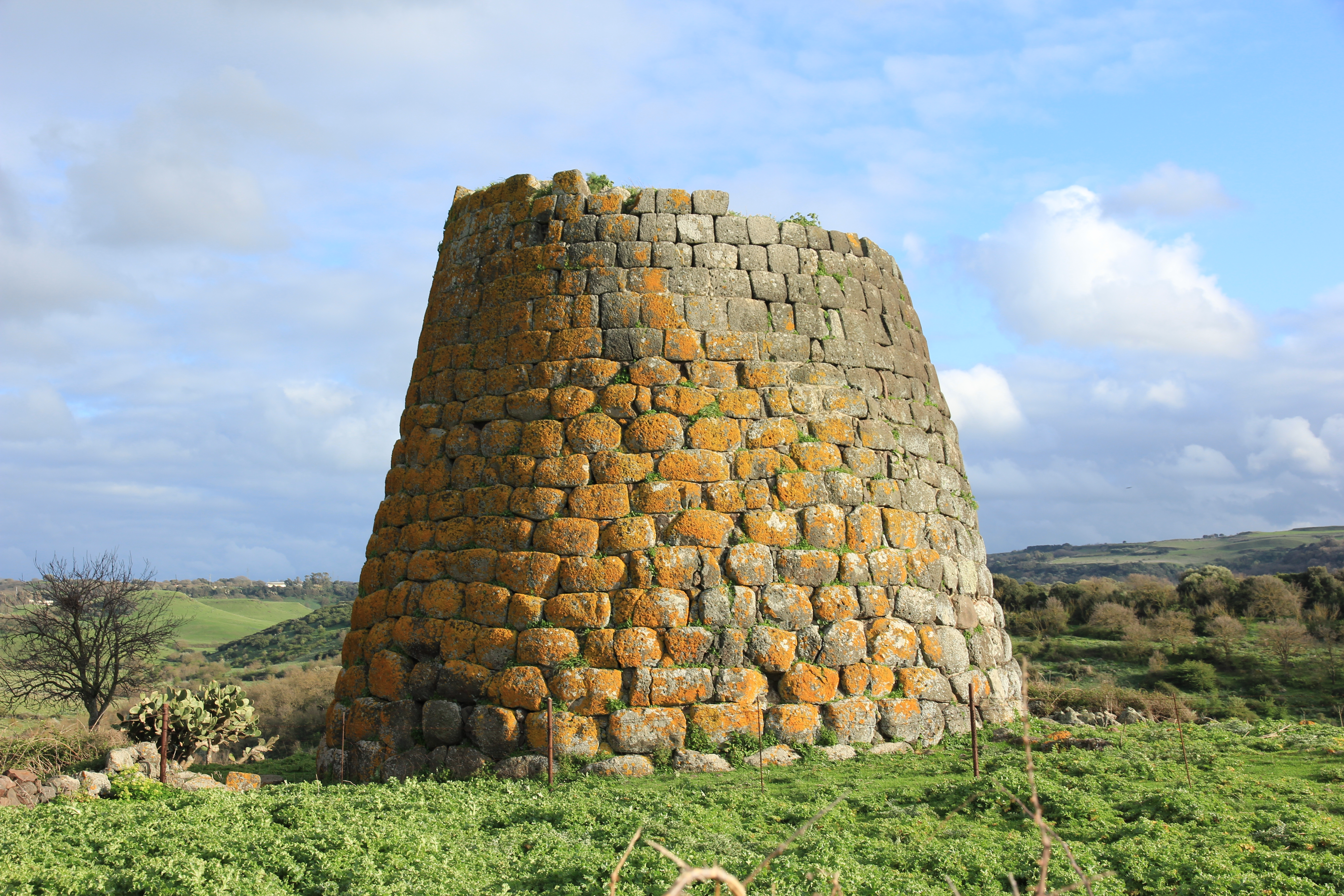
Nuraghe Nieddu, Codrongianos

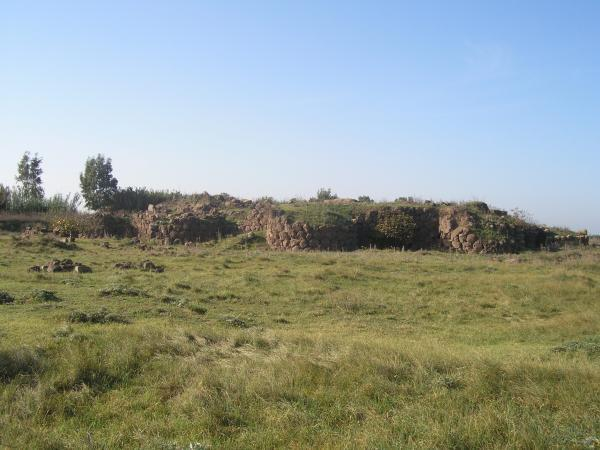
Nuraghe S'Urachi

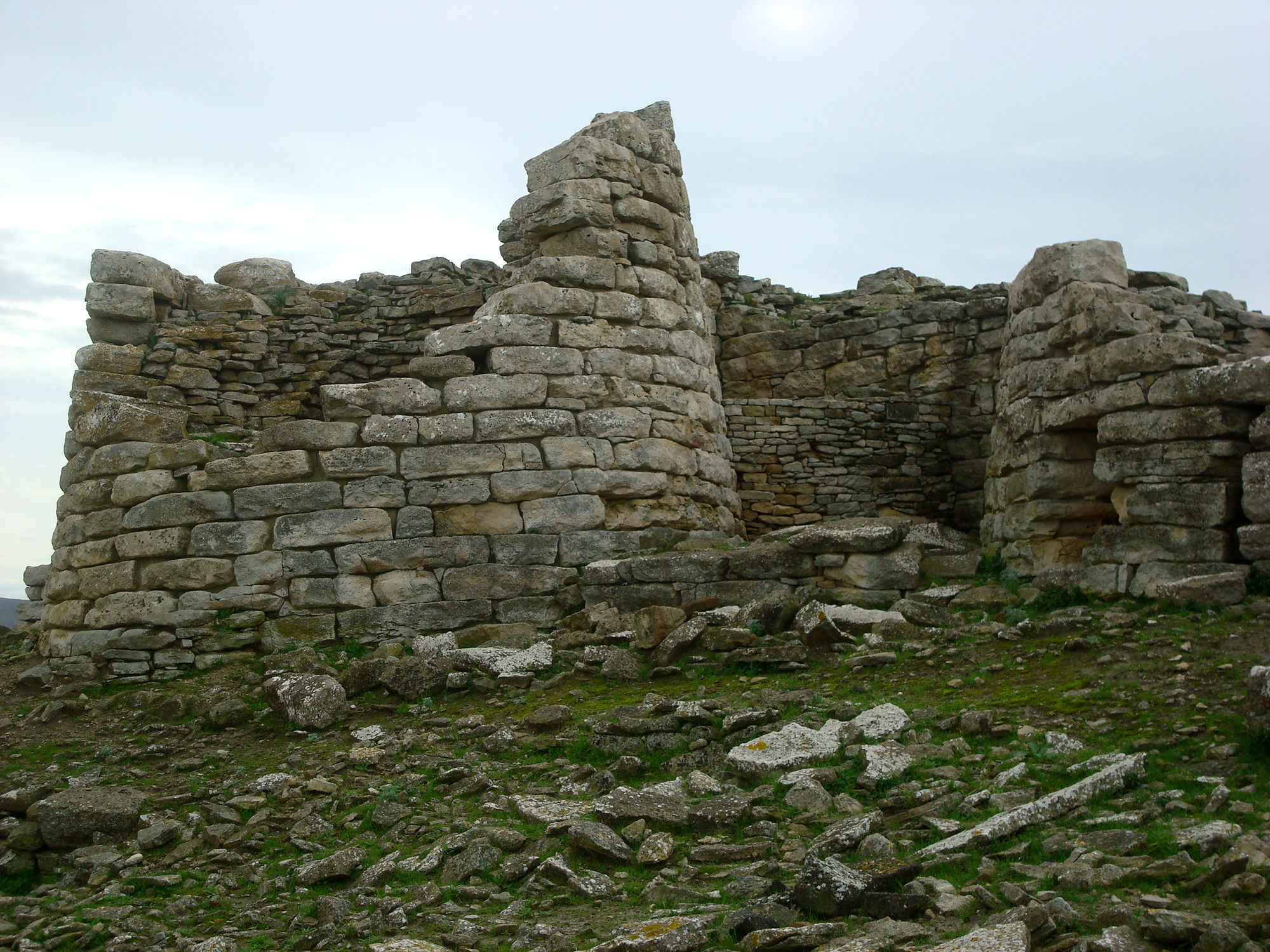
Nuraghe Su Mulinu, Villanovafranca

== See also ==
- Ahwat – site in Israel with structure similar to nuraghes
- Beehive tomb
- Broch of Scotland
- Giants' grave of Sardinia
- Girna of Malta
- Motillas of Spain
- Early and simple domes

== Bibliography ==
- Dyson Stephen L., Rowland Robert J. (2007). Shepherds, sailors, & conquerors – Archeology and History in Sardinia from the Stone Age to the Middle Ages. Philadelphia: University of Pennsylvania, Museum of Archeology and Anthropology. ISBN 978-1-934536-02-5.
- Giovanni Lilliu, I nuraghi. Torri preistoriche della Sardegna, Nuoro, Edizioni Ilisso, 2005. ISBN 88-89188-53-7
- Lilliu, Giovanni (2004). La civiltà dei Sardi. Dal Paleolitico all'età dei nuraghi (in Italian). Edizioni il Maestrale. ISBN 978-88-86109-73-4.
- Paolo Melis, Civiltà Nuragica, Sassari, Delfino editore, 2003. ISBN 88-7138-287-0
- Giovanni Ugas, L'alba dei Nuraghi, Cagliari, Fabula, 2005. ISBN 88-89661-00-3
- Ugas, Giovanni (2016). Shardana e Sardegna : i popoli del mare, gli alleati del Nordafrica e la fine dei Grandi Regni (XV-XII secolo a.C.) (in Italian). Cagliari: Edizioni della Torre. ISBN 9788873434719.
