= Nuraghe S'Urachi =

Archaeological site in Italy

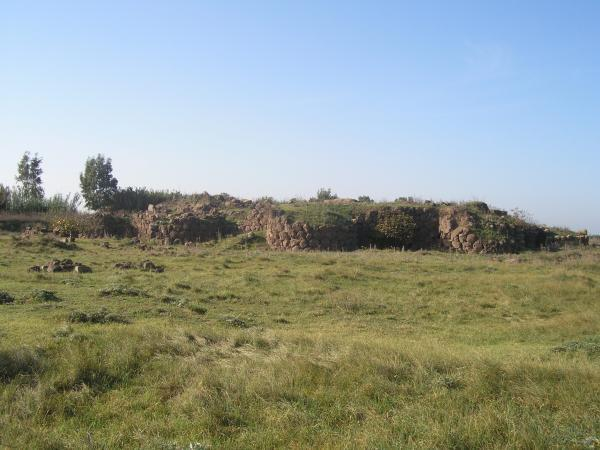
- Nuraghe S'Urachi
- Interactive map of Nuraghe S'Urachi
- 40°00′56″N 8°34′57″E
- Type: Nuraghe
- Periods: Bronze Age
- Cultures: Nuragic civilization
- Location: San Vero Milis, Sardinia, Italy

The Nuraghe S'Urachi or S'Uraki is an archaeological site of the Bronze Age period located in the municipality of San Vero Milis, in the province of Oristano, Sardinia, Italy.

Situated in an alluvial plain near the town, it is a complex nuraghe, protected by seven visible towers, linked together by an antemural, and by three other probable towers that would hide below the old former provincial road 10.

Around it there was a village of huts. From the area of the nuraghe comes the famous bronze candelabra of Cypriot type currently exposed to the National Archaeological Museum of Cagliari.

== Bibliography ==
- G.Lilliu, "D'un candelabro paleosardo del museo di Cagliari", in Studi Sardi, VIII, 1948, pp. 5–42;
- G. Tore, "Intorno ad un 'torciere' bronzeo di tipo cipriota da San Vero Milis (S'Uraki) Oristano", in Società e cultura in Sardegna nei periodi orientalizzante ed arcaico (fine 8° sec. a. C.-480 a.C.): rapporti tra Sardegna, fenici, etruschi e greci, Cagliari, 1986;
- S. Moscati, "Testimonianze fenicio-puniche ad Oristano", in Atti della Accademia nazionale dei Lincei, 31, 1, Roma, 1988.
