= Nuraghe Palmavera =

Coordinates: 40.5950°N 8.2428°E

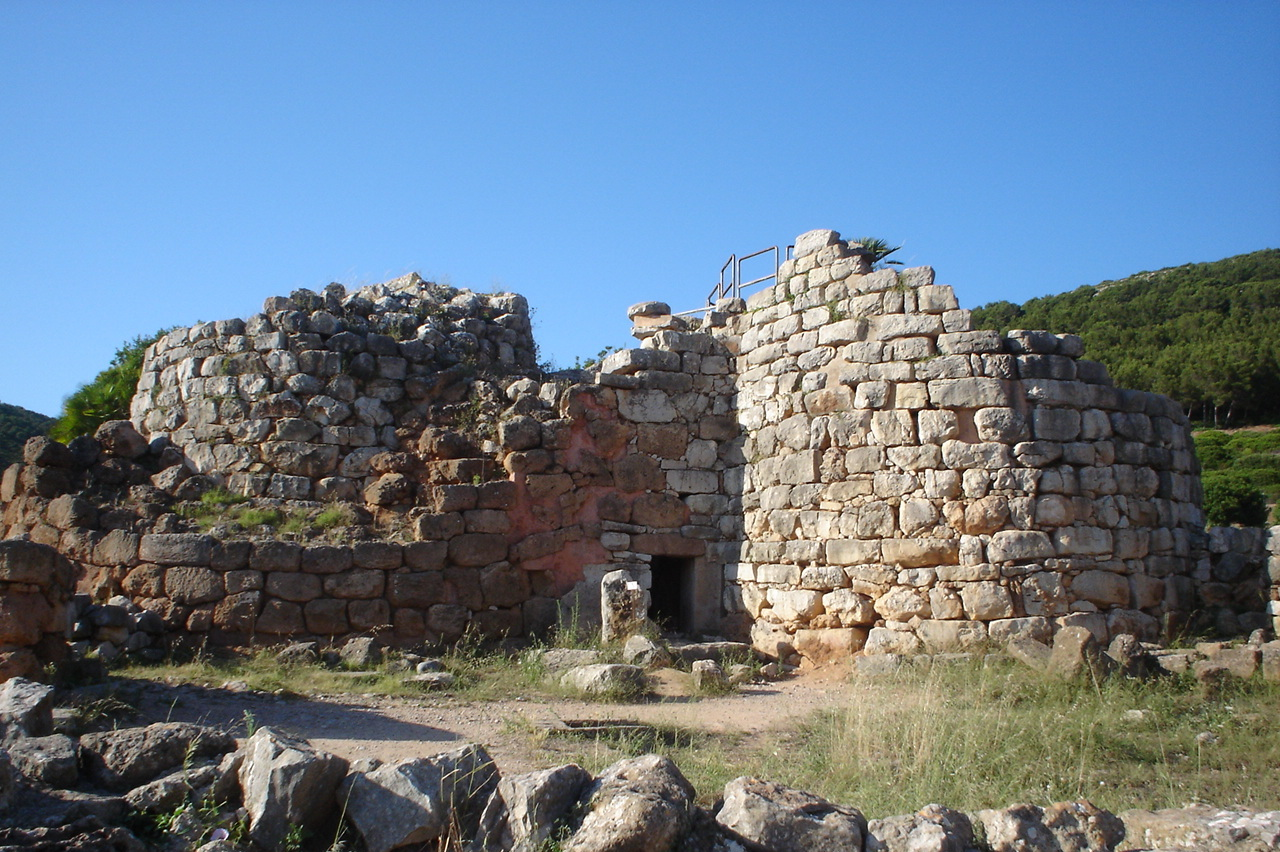
- Nuraghe Palmavera
- Interactive map of Nuraghe Palmavera
- Type: Settlement
- Periods: Bronze Age, Iron Age
- Cultures: Nuragic civilization
- Location: Alghero, Sardinia, Italy

The nuraghe Palmavera is an archaeological site located in the territory of Alghero, Sardinia. It is classified as a complex nuraghe, that consists of several towers joined together. The nuraghe and the surrounding village were built in various phase during the Bronze Age and the Iron Age.

== History ==
=== First phase ===
The main tower dates back to the first phase (15th-14th century BC) and retains the central chamber covered with the tholos and built with stones in limestone. The tower is archaic, with the entrance free of side passages and with the niches just sketched in the walls of the main chamber. There must have been also some huts outside the nuraghe.

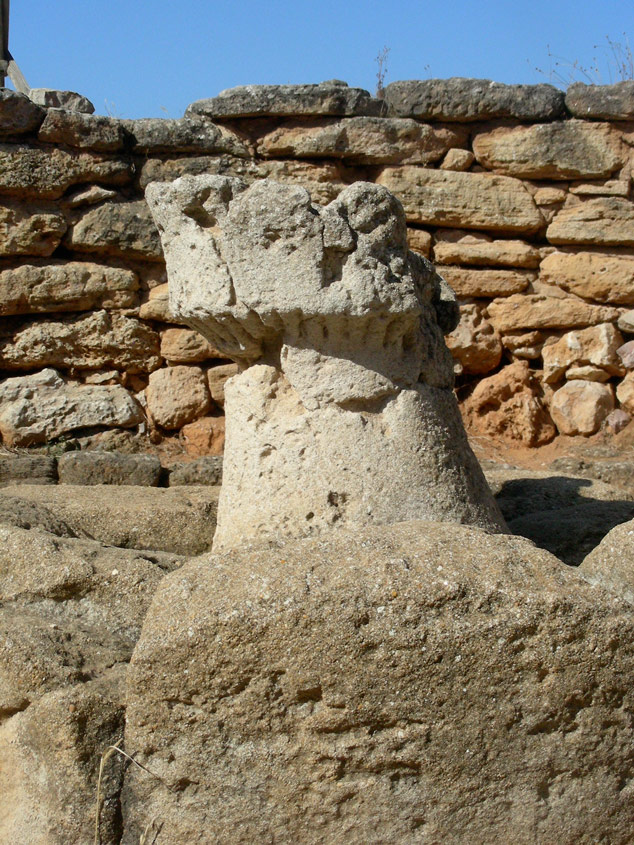
The nuraghe model inside the meeting hut

=== Second phase ===
In the second phase (first half of the ninth century BC) was added a second tower and restored the previous tower with blocks of sandstone. The two towers communicated through an interior courtyard and a corridor with niches.

It was also built the meeting hut, equipped with a stone seat that runs along the perimeter, interrupted by a tank made of stone slabs, of unknown function, and a round stone seat for the chief, standing next to a niche in the wall. At the center of the hut, on a circular altar, it is present a model of a nuragic tower in sandstone. In this period were also built other huts in the village of higher dimension.

=== Third phase ===
In the third phase (9th-8th century BC), the nuraghe was restored again with blocks of limestone and around it was built an exterior wall with four towers-huts, forming two outer courts, divided by a wall with no openings. In one of these courts it was inserted the meeting hut, in the other has been identified a silo.

=== Destruction and abandonment of the site ===
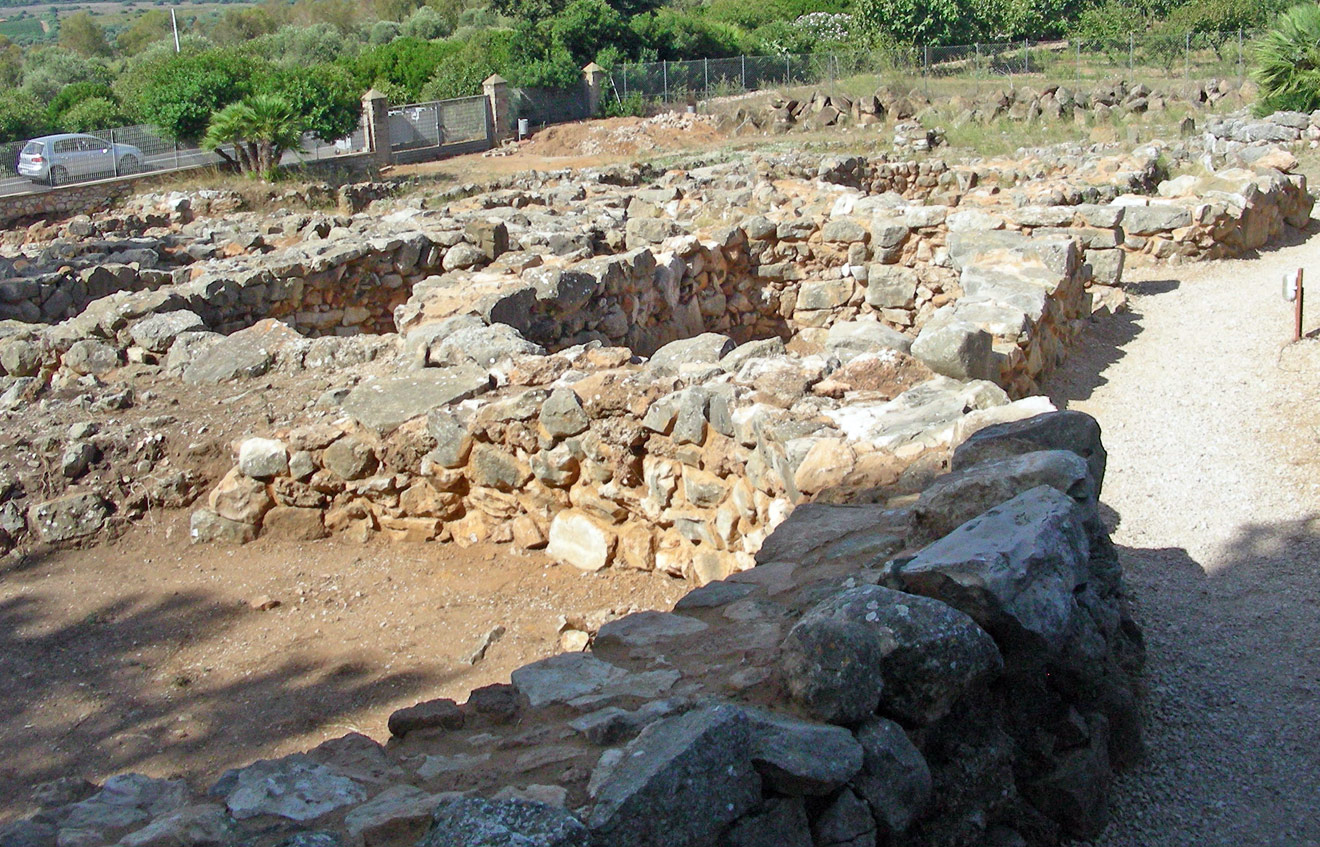
Huts

The village was destroyed by fire, probably at the end of the eighth century BC and was later sporadically attended in Punic and Roman times, as witnessed by some pottery found.

== Bibliography ==
- Moravetti, Alberto (1992). Il complesso nuragico di Palmavera (in Italian). Carlo Delfino. ISBN 88-7138-056-8. OCLC 30811231.
- Antonio Taramelli, Il nuraghe Palmavera di Alghero, in “Mon. Ant. Lincei”, XIX, coll. 225-30.
