= Nuraghe Losa =

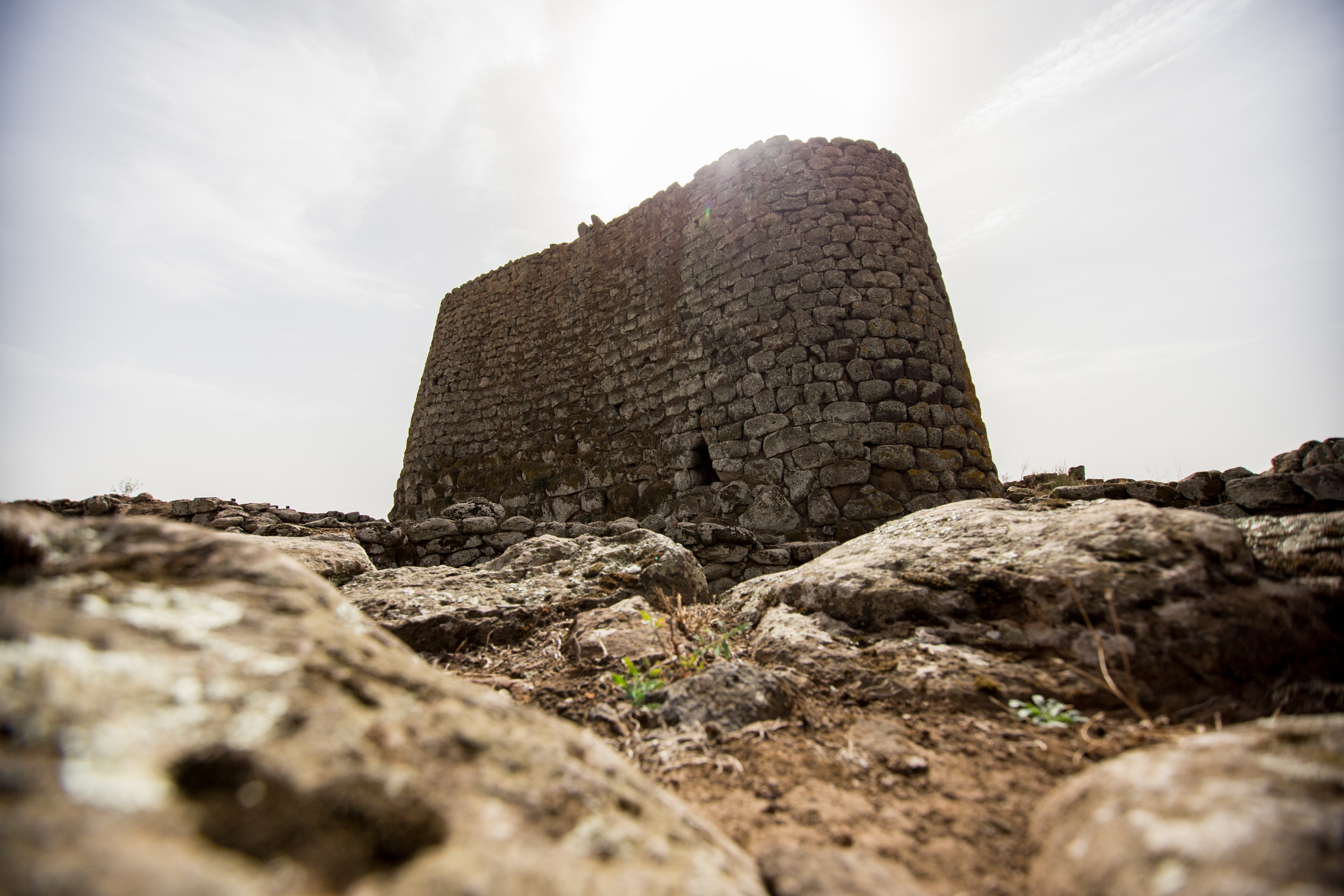
- Nuraghe Losa

- Location within Sardinia
- 40°7′0.84″N 8°47′24.252″E
- Type: Monument
- Cultures: Nuragic civilization

Site notes
- Excavation dates: yes
- Condition: ruined
- Management: I Beni Culturali della Sardegna
- Public access: yes
- Website: Abbasanta, Nuraghe Losa (in Italian)

The nuraghe Losa (in Sardinia, close to the village of Abbasanta) is a complex prehistoric building in the shape of a tholos tomb. Its central structure has a triangular shape. On the west side, a turreted wall is linked to it. The whole built complex is surrounded by a wider wall, which encloses the settlement of the original village of huts and other additional buildings constructed in the late Punic, imperial Roman, late Roman and high Middle Ages periods. The central tower was built in the 14th century BC, while the surrounding walls and towers were built in the 13th century BC.

== Gallery ==
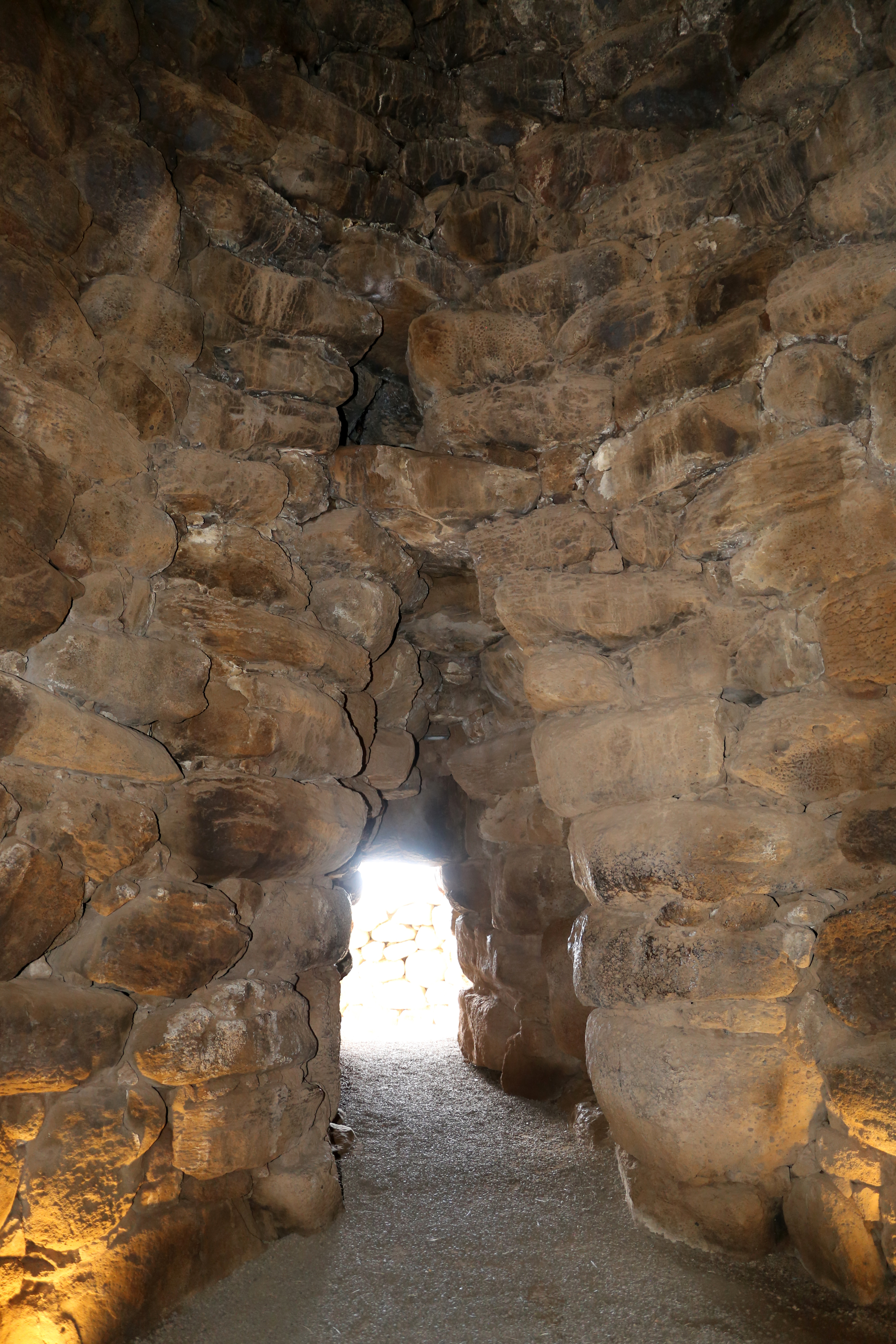
Interior

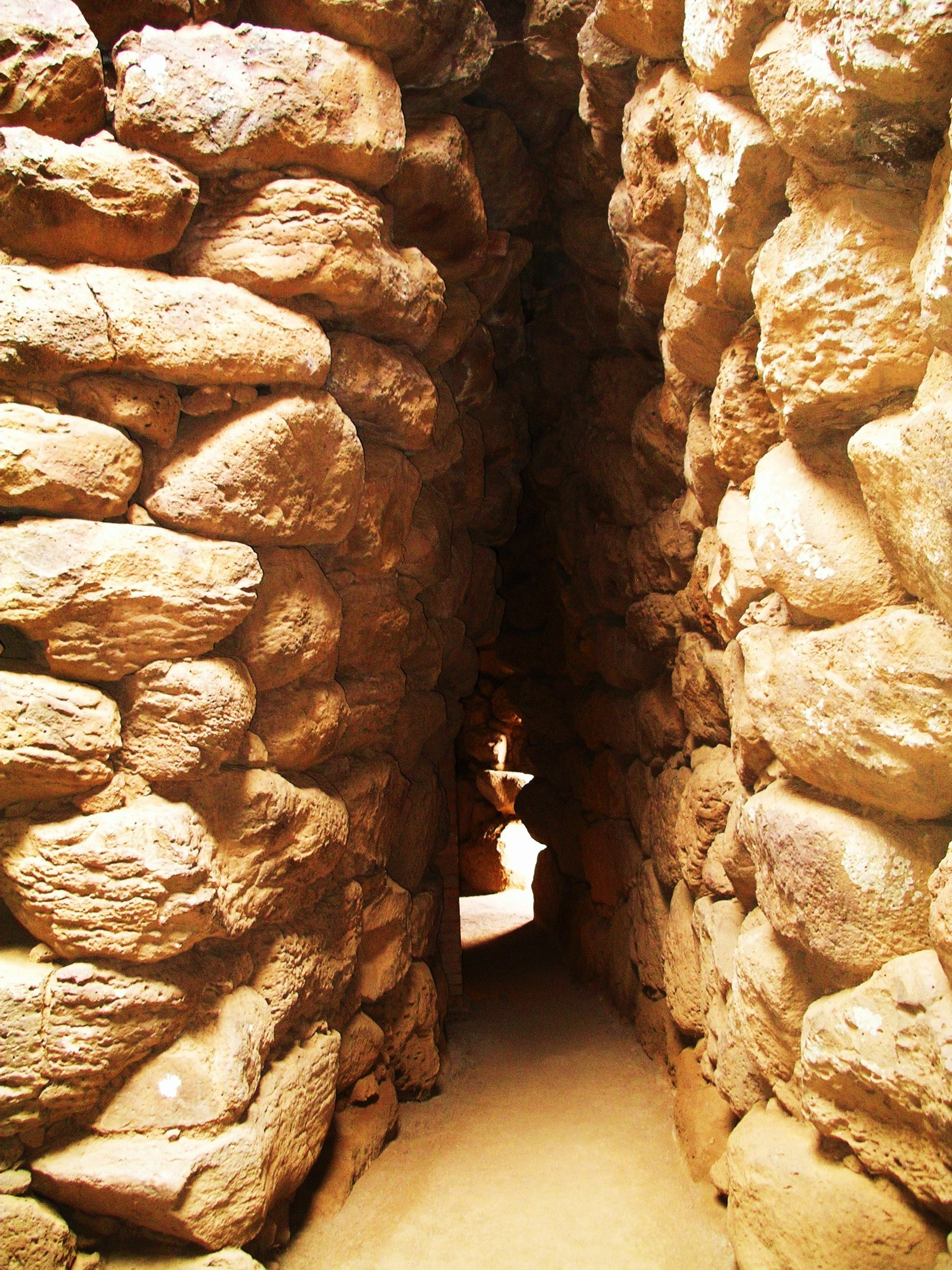
Corridor

== Bibliography ==
- Robert Andrews (2004). The Rough Guide to Sardinia. Rough Guides. p. 184. ISBN 9781843532378.
