= Abbasanta =

- Comune
- Comune di Abbasanta
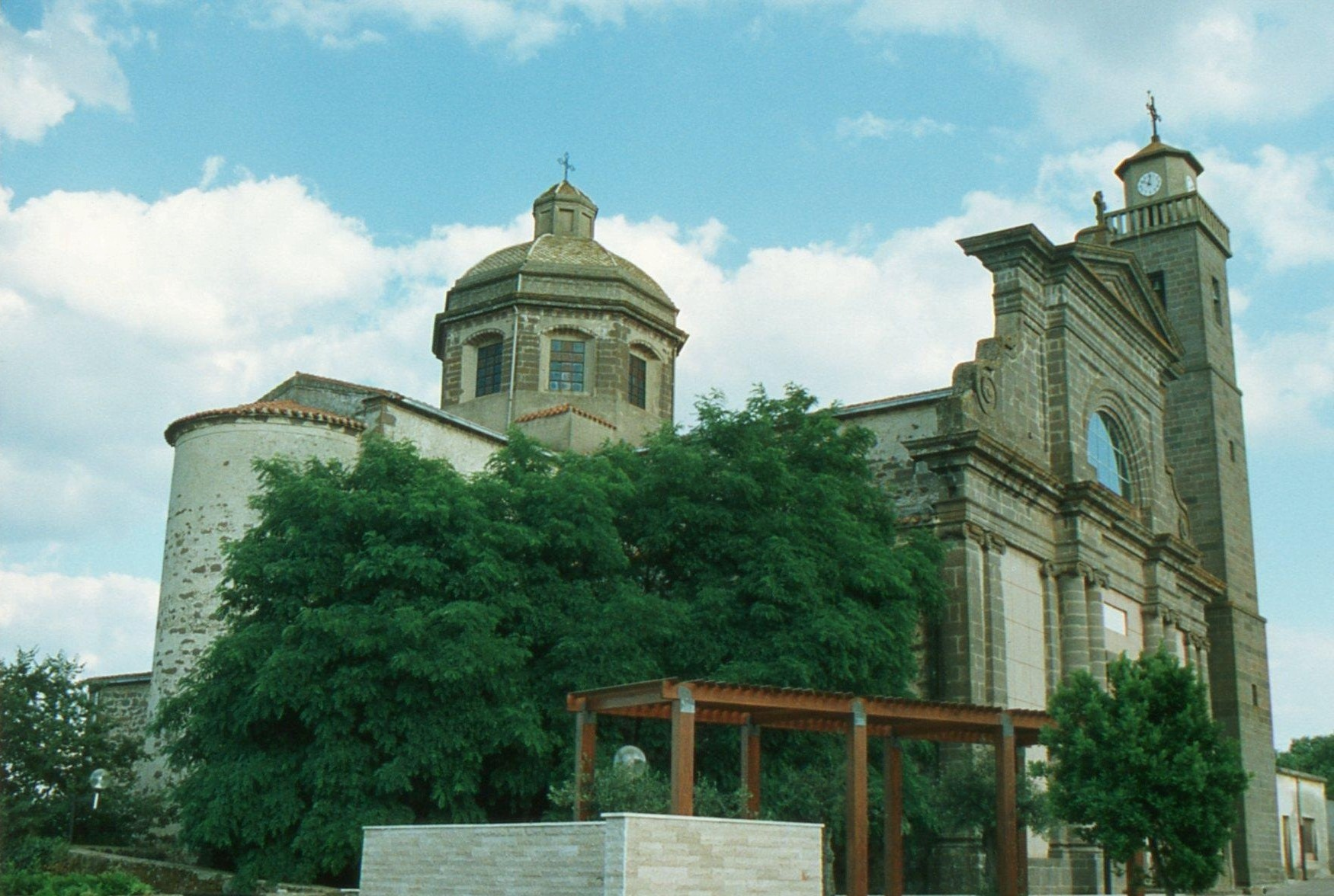
- Church of Santa Caterina in Abbasanta

- Location within Sardinia
- Coordinates: 40°7′N 8°49′E
- Country: Italy
- Region: Sardinia
- Province: Oristano

Government
  - Mayor: Stefano Sanna

Area
  - Total: 39.85 km^{2} (15.39 sq mi)
- Elevation: 313 m (1,027 ft)

Population (2026)
  - Total: 2,539
  - Density: 63.71/km^{2} (165.0/sq mi)
- Demonyms: Abbasantesi; Abbasantesos
- Time zone: UTC+1 (CET)
  - Summer (DST): UTC+2 (CEST)
- Postal code: 09071
- Dialing code: 0785
- Patron saint: Saint Catherine of Siena
- Saint day: 25 November
- Website: Official website

Abbasanta (Italian: [abbaˈsanta; -ˈzan-], Sardinian: [ˌabaˈzanta], literally "holy water"; Latin: Ad Medias) is a town and comune (municipality) in the Province of Oristano of the autonomous island region of Sardinia in Italy. It has 2,539 inhabitants.

It is on the main road between Macomer and Oristano.

== History ==
In Roman times, the town, called Ad Medias, was in the territory of the Æchilenenses or Cornenses.

The village was built all around the two churches of Santa Amada and Santa Caterina (dedicated to Catherine of Alexandria). There was a clear separation between social classes.

Until the 1950s the use of Italian and Sardinian language had distinct and complementary functions. Italian was the official language, used by the public administration, while Sardinian was the language spoken at home and among friends. The characteristic expressions of the dialect are usually inspired by the peasant and pastoral world. Many proverbs refer to the values of honesty, friendship, fidelity (of the woman), loyalty, parsimony and obedience to the divine will.

== Geography ==
Abbasanta sits on a lava plateau rich in cork oaks, olive trees and lentischi (mastic trees). The plateau arose from the lava flow of the Montiferru volcano. The landscape of the lava plateau is characterised by pastures that are enclosed by stone walls that surround the tancas built in the 18th century.

In the surrounding countryside, there are still some typical shelters (pinnete) made of stones and boughs by the shepherds.

Abbasanta borders the municipalities of Ghilarza, Norbello, Paulilatino, and Santu Lussurgiu.

== Demographics ==
As of 2026, the population is 2,539, of which 49% are male, and 51% are female. Minors make up 13.4% of the population, and seniors make up 28.5%.

Historical population

Year	Pop.	±%
1861	1,330	—
1871	1,437	+8.0%
1881	1,596	+11.1%
1901	1,425	−10.7%
1911	1,491	+4.6%
1921	1,465	−1.7%
1931	1,633	+11.5%
1936	1,678	+2.8%

Year	Pop.	±%
1951	2,208	+31.6%
1961	2,323	+5.2%
1971	2,059	−11.4%
1981	2,353	+14.3%
1991	2,640	+12.2%
2001	2,815	+6.6%
2011	2,828	+0.5%
2021	2,594	−8.3%

Source: ISTAT

=== Immigration ===
As of 2025, of the known countries of birth of 2,562 residents, the most numerous are: Italy (2,456 – 95.9%), Morocco (42 – 1.6%).

Foreign population by country of birth (2025)
Country of birth	Population
Morocco	42
Romania	12
Germany	9
France	7
Poland	6
Switzerland	5
Argentina	4
Netherlands	4
Australia	3
Belgium	3
China	3
Algeria	2
Spain	2
United Kingdom	2
Afghanistan	1

== Architecture ==
In the village the stone houses are characteristic. They are low and with few floors, without sheds, but usually with a back courtyard where some space is reserved for the domestic animals. This is a quite common architectural dwelling in an area traditionally involved in sheep farming rather than agriculture.

The front room of the house is often a courtyard for chickens, in the centre of which there is the hearth (Sardinian: su foghile), used for hanging and drying cured pork meat. Later, fireplaces replaced the hearths.

== Main sights ==
The whole of the Abbasanta plateau is rich in archaeological sites. Very close to the village is the nuraghe Losa.

A country church is set on the site of Sant'Agostino (dedicated to Augustine of Hippo). Around the rural church, there are some characteristic small houses (in Sardinian language muristenes or cumbessias) that host the pilgrims during the religious feasts.

== Sources ==
- Barrington Atlas of the Greek and Roman World, Map 48.
