= Isili =

Isili Ìsili
- Comune
- Comune di Isili
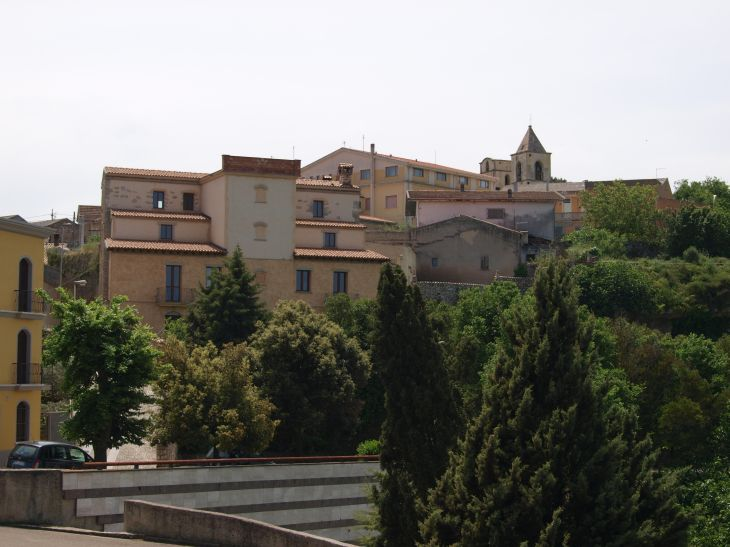

- Location within Sardinia
- Coordinates: 39°45′N 9°7′E
- Country: Italy
- Region: Sardinia
- Metropolitan city: Cagliari (CA)

Government
  - Mayor: Orlando Carcangiu

Area
  - Total: 68.0 km^{2} (26.3 sq mi)
- Elevation: 523 m (1,716 ft)

Population (31 December 2010)
  - Total: 2,950
  - Density: 43.4/km^{2} (112/sq mi)
- Demonym: Isilesi
- Time zone: UTC+1 (CET)
  - Summer (DST): UTC+2 (CEST)
- Postal code: 08033
- Dialing code: 0782

Isili (Sardinian: Ìsili) is a comune (municipality) in the Metropolitan City of Cagliari, southern Sardinia, Italy, located about 60 kilometres (37 mi) north of Cagliari in the Sarcidano traditional region.

Isili borders the following municipalities: Gergei, Gesturi, Laconi, Nuragus, Nurallao, Nurri, Serri, Villanova Tulo.

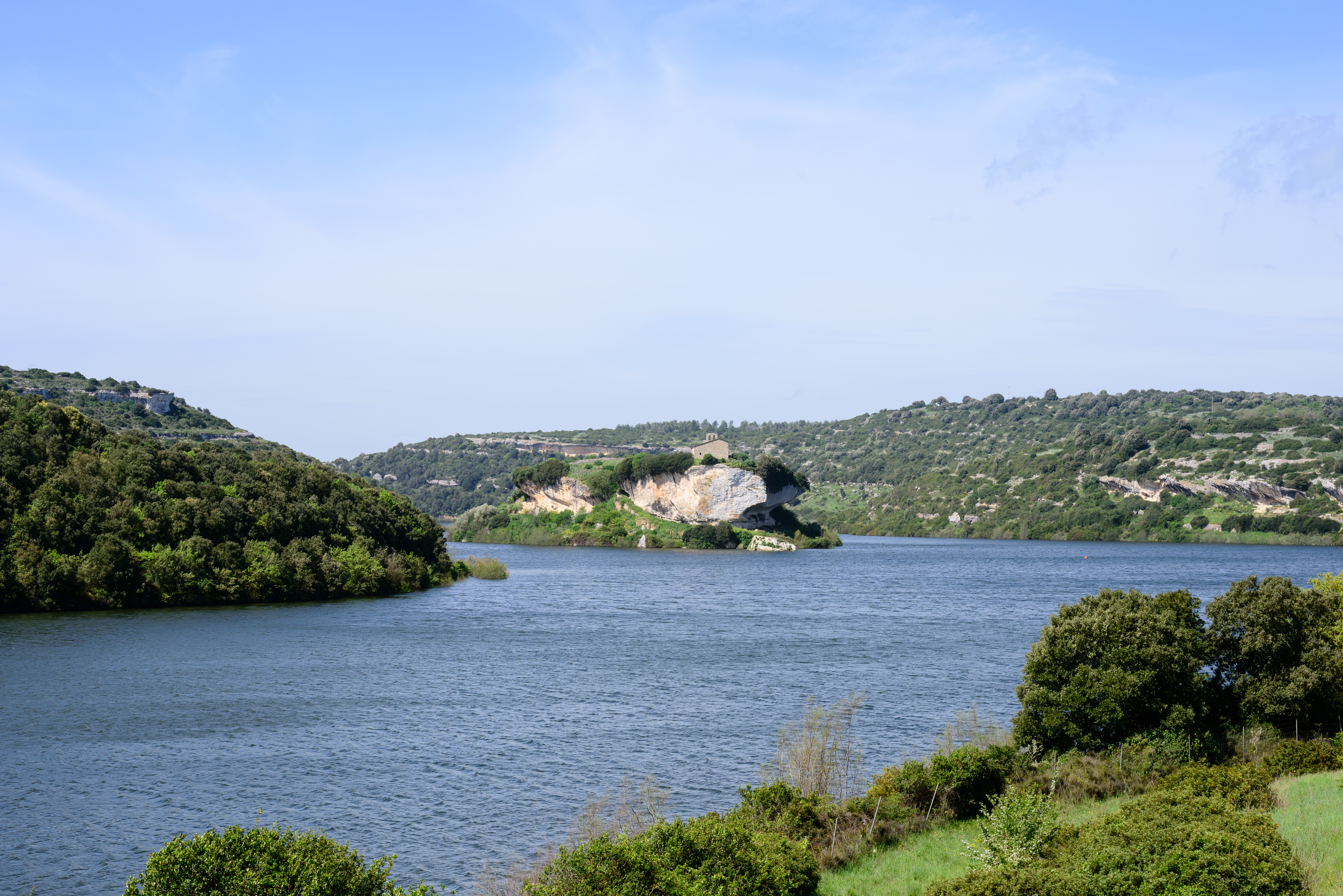
Lake Barrocus

== Main sights ==
- Nuraghe Is Paras
