= Nuraghe Adoni =

Nuragas

Coordinates: 39.7858°N 9.1731°E

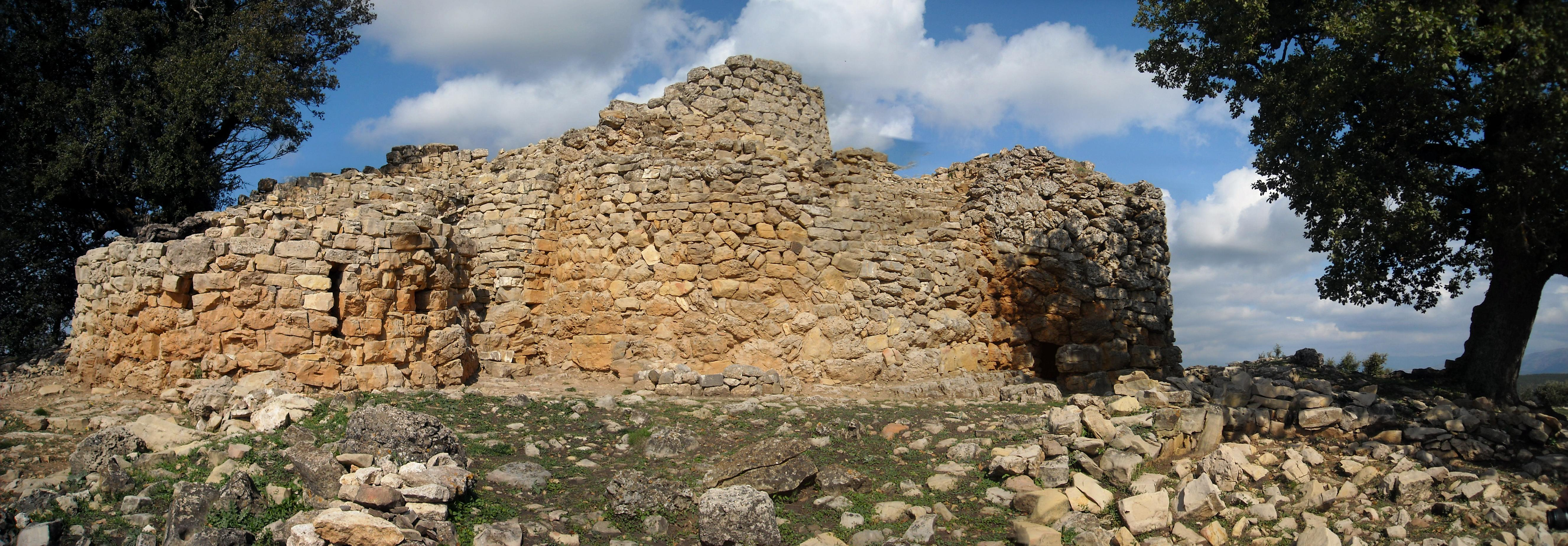
- Nuraghe Adoni
- Interactive map of Nuraghe Adoni
- Type: Settlement
- Periods: Bronze Age
- Cultures: Nuragic civilization
- Location: Villanova Tulo, Sardinia, Italy

The Nuraghe Adoni is a Nuragic complex dating back to the Bronze Age located in the municipality of Villanova Tulo in the province of Cagliari. The site is located on a hill at the center of the historic region of Sarcidano.

The first excavations of the site date back to the mid-nineteenth century and were resumed several times in the 1990s. The entire complex consists of a nuraghe composed of a central tower and a quatrefoil bastion, surrounded by a village. At the site there several artifacts were found such as ceramics and a fragment of a bronze loop of the Schnabelkanne type.

== Gallery ==
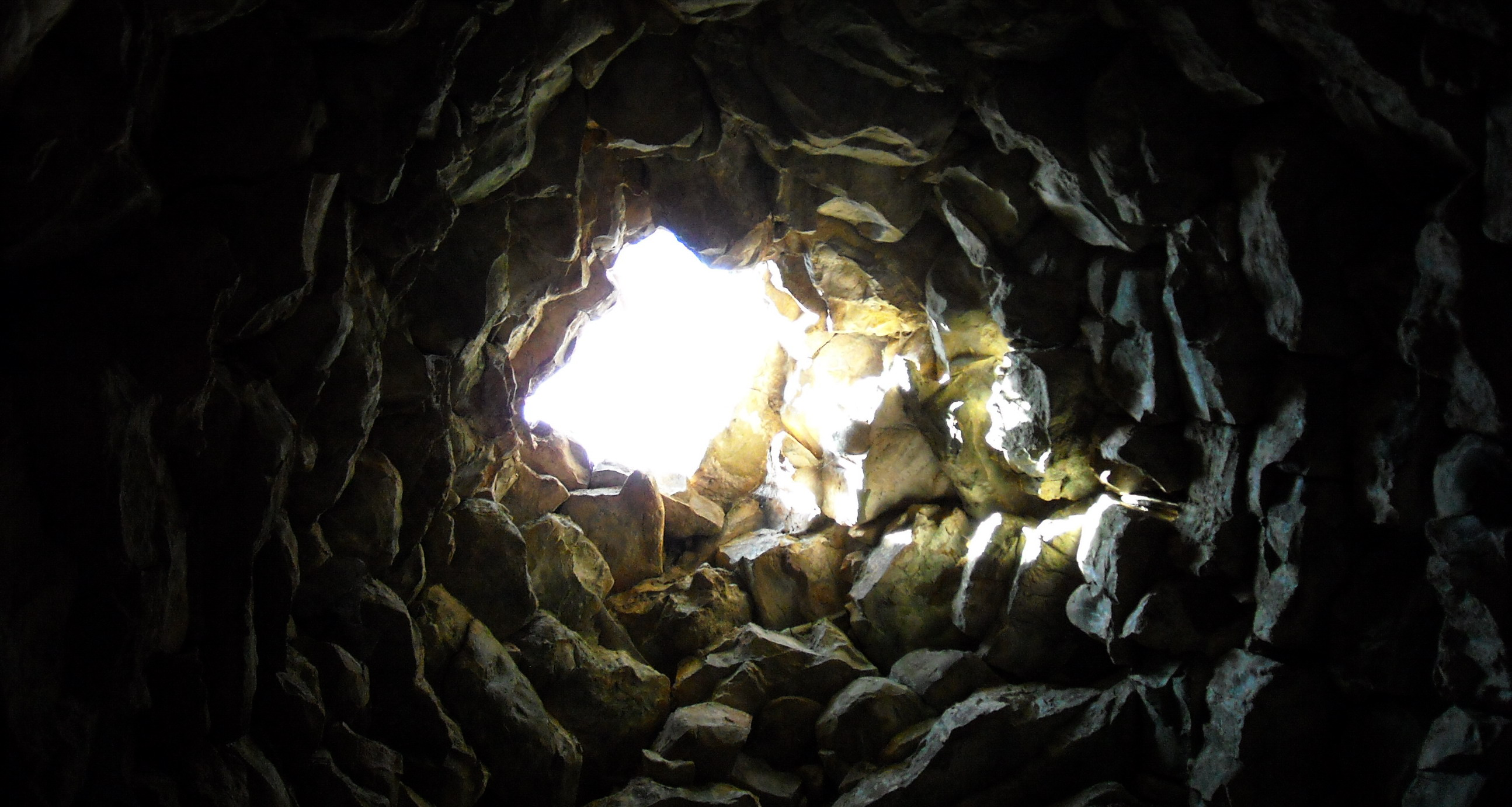
Tholos of the lateral tower

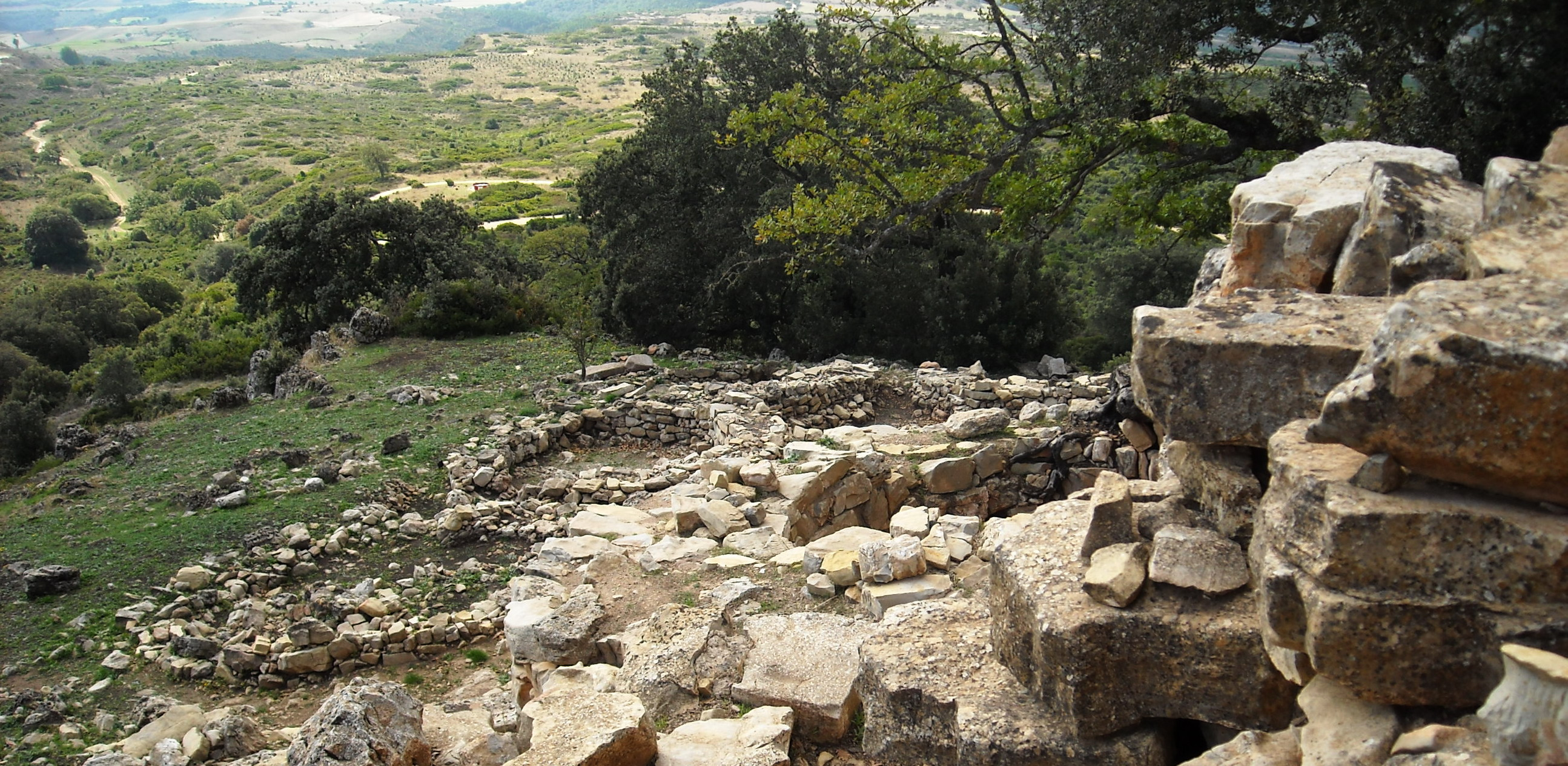
Ruins of the village
