= Francesco Antonio Broccu =

Italian artisan and inventor

- Born: May 16, 1797; Gadoni,Sardinia
- Died: 1882; Gadoni
- Occupations: Inventor; Artisan

Francesco Antonio Broccu (1797–1882), was an Italian artisan and inventor, born in Gadoni, Sardinia, regarded as the first developer of the revolver, realised by him in 1833.

He received a prize of 300 francs for his invention, but he did not patent it. His revolver was shown to the King Charles Albert of Sardinia in 1843. In 1835, a similar gun was patented by Samuel Colt.

== Biography ==
Born and living in Gadoni, a small town in Sardinia in the province of Nuoro, from childhood he showed a keen interest in mechanics, and he built many toys using materials such as reeds, wood and cork. He also built bronze bells and a wooden crucifix of excellent workmanship. He designed and built a craft watch and various mechanical tools for agricultural use.

== Historical context ==
Three years after Broccu’s invention, Samuel Colt patented his revolving-cylinder pistol in 1836. Colt’s design benefited from patent protection, industrial manufacturing, and international marketing, which ensured its widespread adoption. By contrast, Broccu’s work remained largely unknown outside Sardinia, though historians acknowledge it as evidence that multi-shot handgun concepts predated Colt’s commercial success.
