= Nuraghe Is Paras =

Coordinates: 39.7486°N 9.1075°E

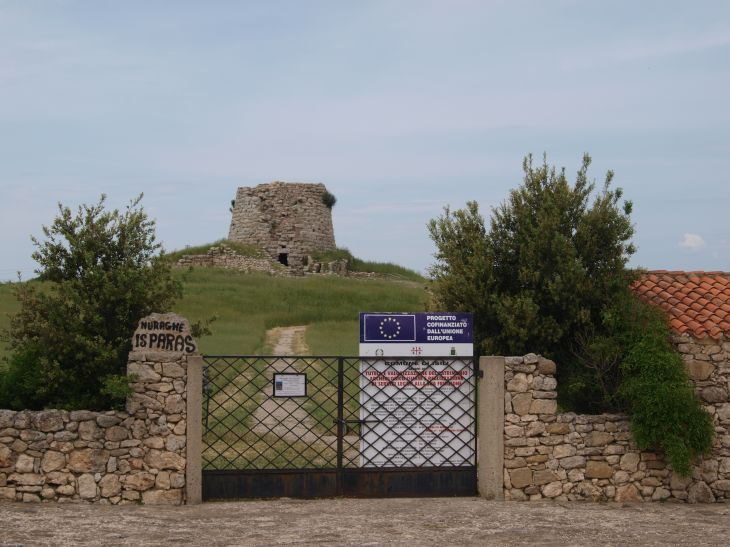
- Nuraghe Is Paras
- Interactive map of Nuraghe Is Paras
- Type: Settlement
- Periods: Bronze Age
- Cultures: Nuragic civilization
- Location: Isili, Sardinia, Italy

The nuraghe Is Paras is an archeological site of Isili, a town in the historical region of Sarcidano, province of South Sardinia.

The nuraghe is located in a strategic position dominating the underlying territories open to the West. Its shape is that of a trilobate nuraghe, formed by a triangular bastion with three towers at the corners.

According to the archaeologist Giovanni Lilliu its tholos is the largest and most harmonious of all those present in Sardinia. The diameter of the base of the tower is of about 12,50 meters, its tholos chamber reached a height of 11,80 meters, making it the tallest dome in the world when it was built in the 15-14th century BC, it was surpassed by the underground tholos of the tomb of Atreus one or two centuries later. Inside the main tower there's a circular well. Originally there was an additional chamber on top of the first one, which would be reached through the still partially extant spiral staircase. Three smaller towers were added around the main one during the 13th century BC and connected by a wall. The complex was in turn surrounded by an external wall with towers.

== Gallery ==
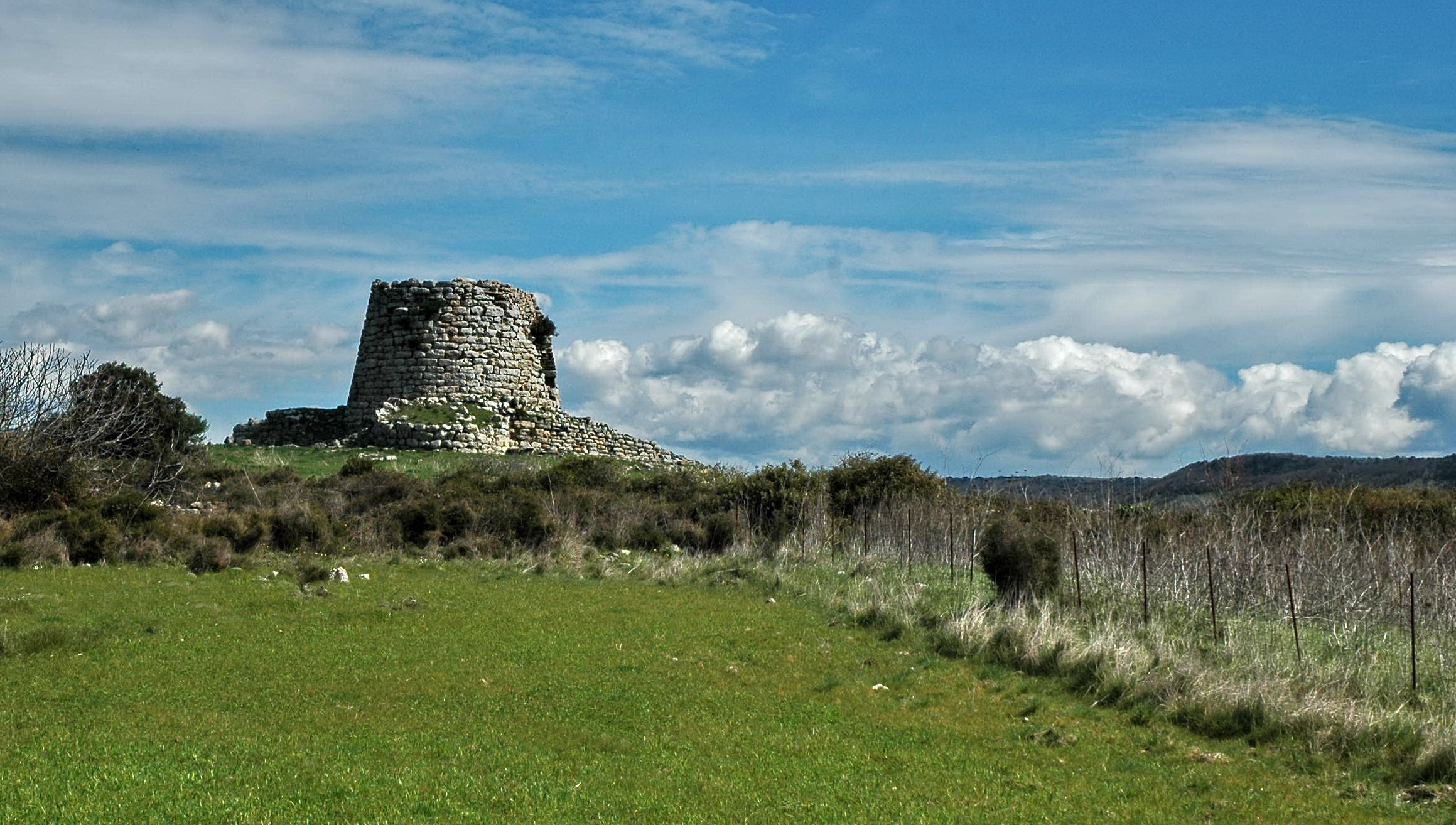

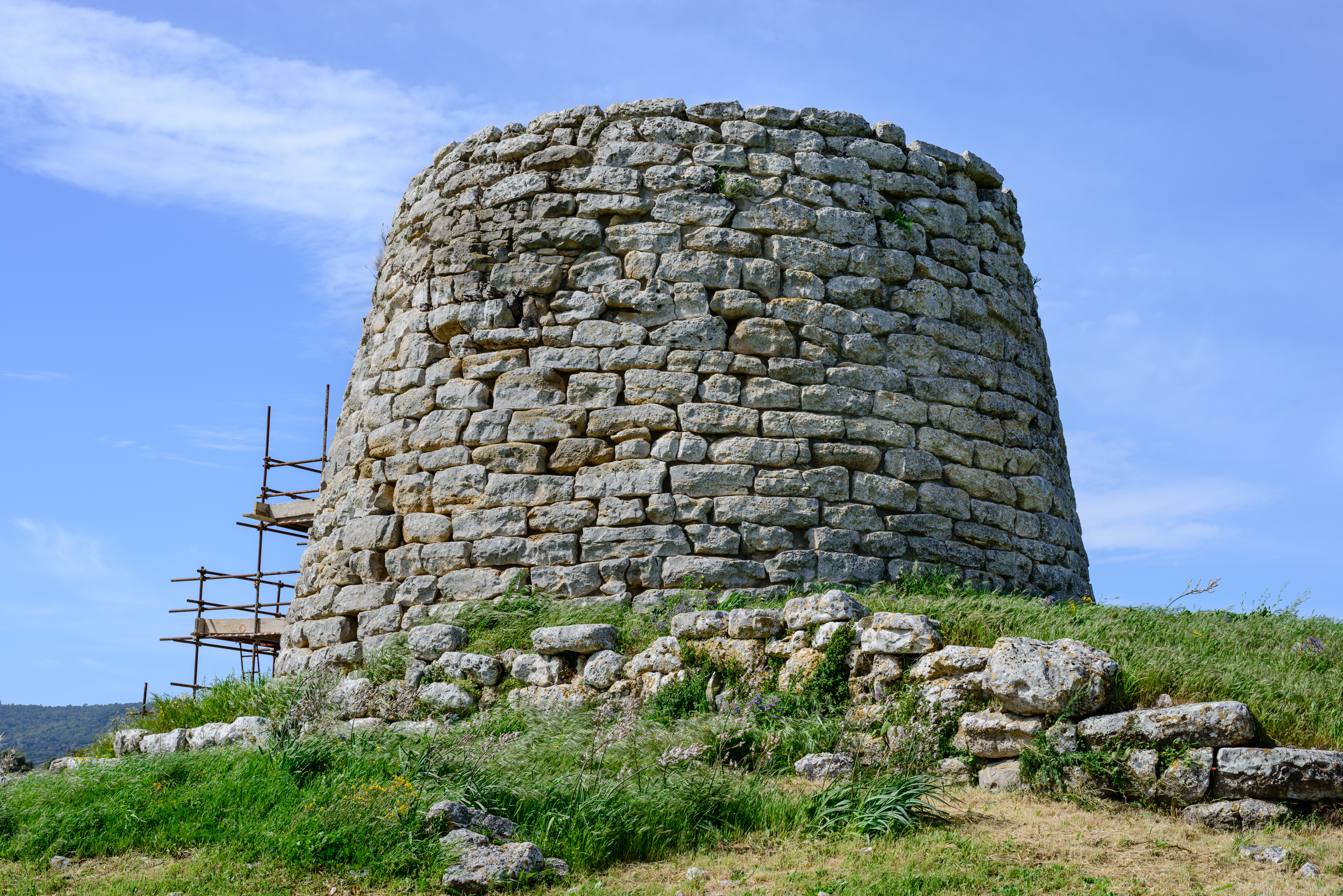

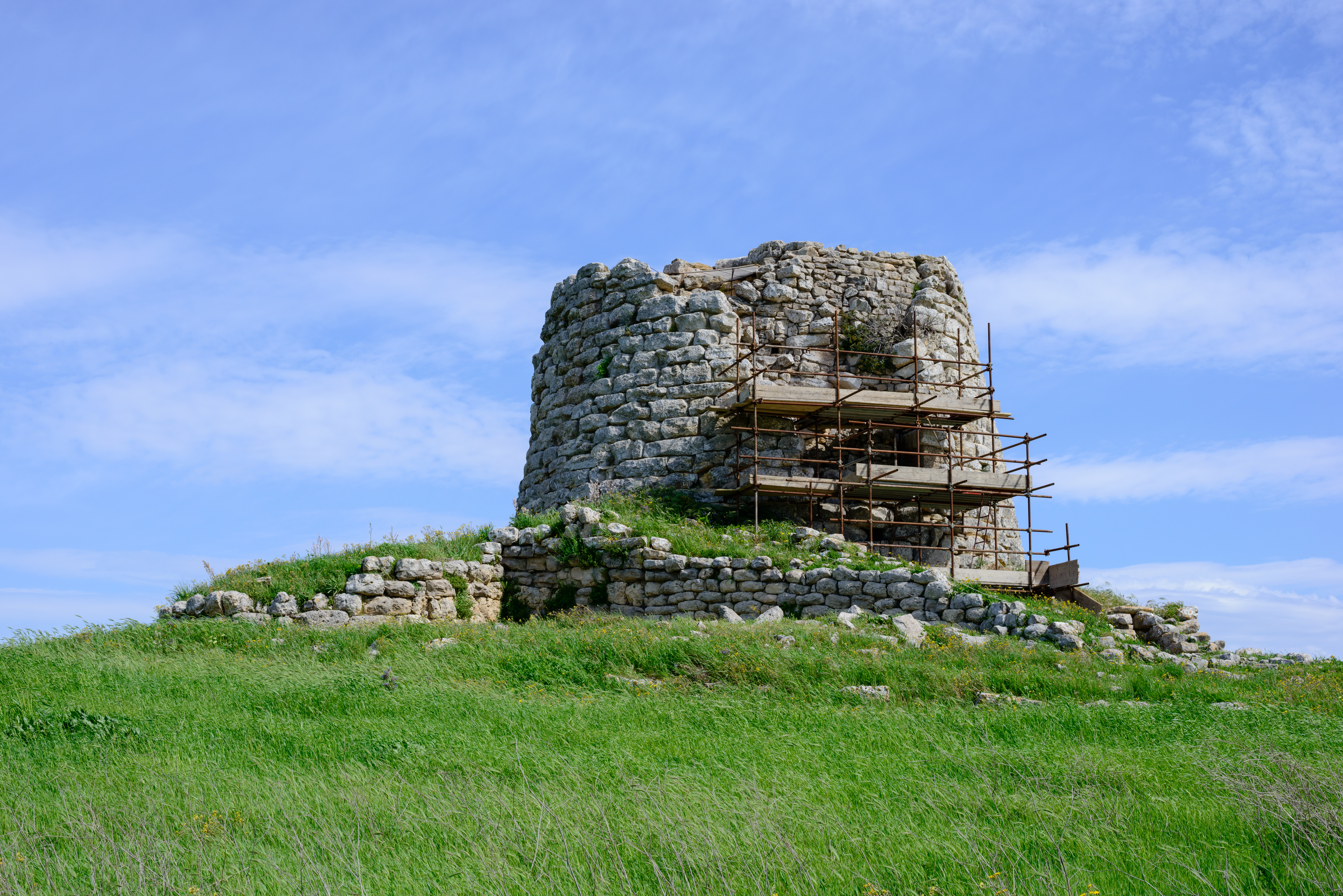

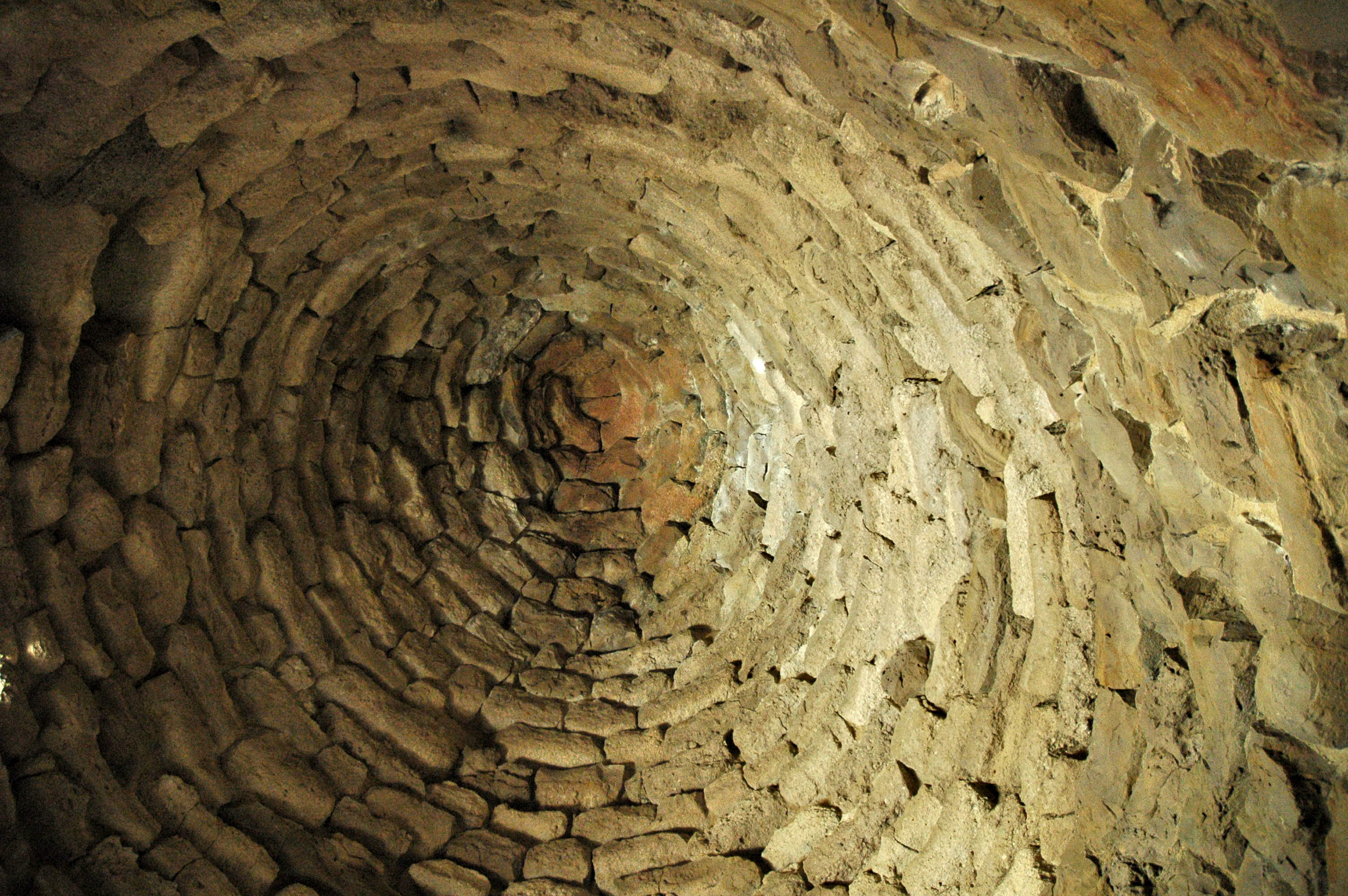

== See also ==
- Early and simple domes

== Bibliography ==
- Giovanni Lilliu, I nuraghi, torri preistoriche della Sardegna, Cagliari, La Zattera 1962
- Ercole Contu, L'architettura nuragica, Ichnussa. La Sardegna dalle origini all'età classica, Milano, Scheiwiller 1981
- A. Moravetti, Gli interventi del 1975-77 nel nuraghe Is Paras di Isili, in L’eredità del Sarcidano e della Barbagia di Seulo, Sassari - Blackwood e Partners 2000
- T. Cossu, Il Nuraghe Is Paras di Isili: campagna di scavo 1998, in L’eredità del Sarcidano e della Barbagia di Seulo, Sassari - Blackwood e Partners 2000
