= Nuraghe Su Mulinu =

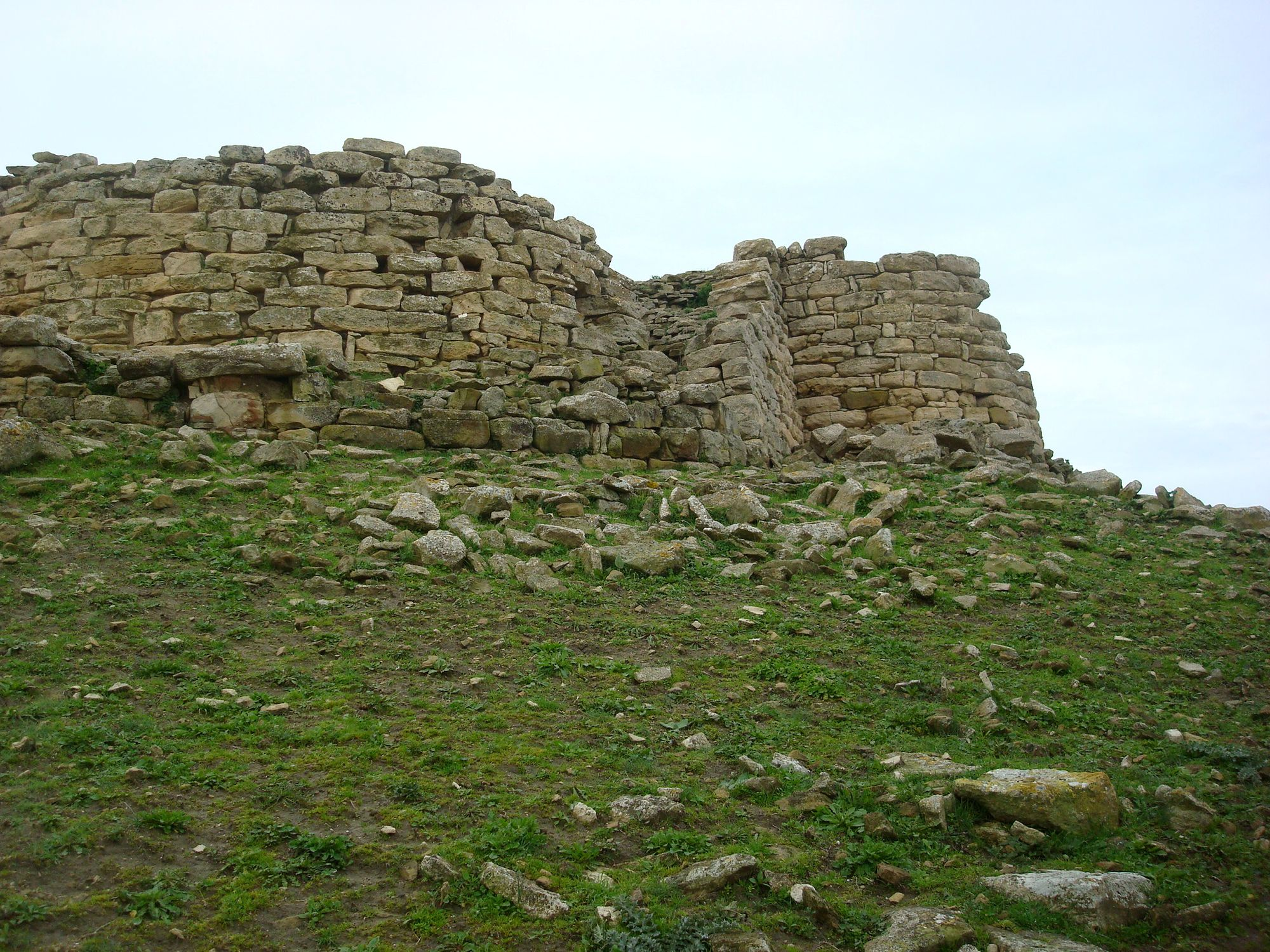
- Nuraghe Su Mulinu

- Location within Sardinia
- 39°38′04″N 8°59′39″E
- Type: Settlement
- Periods: Bronze Age
- Cultures: Nuragic civilization
- Location: Villanovafranca, Sardinia, Italy

Nuraghe Su Mulinu is an archaeological site located in the territory of Villanovafranca, in the province of South Sardinia.

== Description ==
The site is located less than a kilometer from the village, on a dorsal overlooking the Flumini Mannu.

It is a construction that dates back to 1800 BC, which has the peculiarity of being composed of different types of constructions such as a corridor Nuraghe (the oldest part of the building) and false dome towers. The site was later re-settled in the Punic, Roman and medieval eras. The false vaulted towers date to the recent Bronze Age and to the final Bronze Age (14th-12th century bc).

Inside a tower was found the only example of nuragic altar of the first Iron Age (late 10th-early 8th century bc), consisting of a stone carved on vertical motifs with the eagerness of the moon goddess. It was excavated several times since 1983 by archaeologist Giovanni Ugas.

== Gallery ==
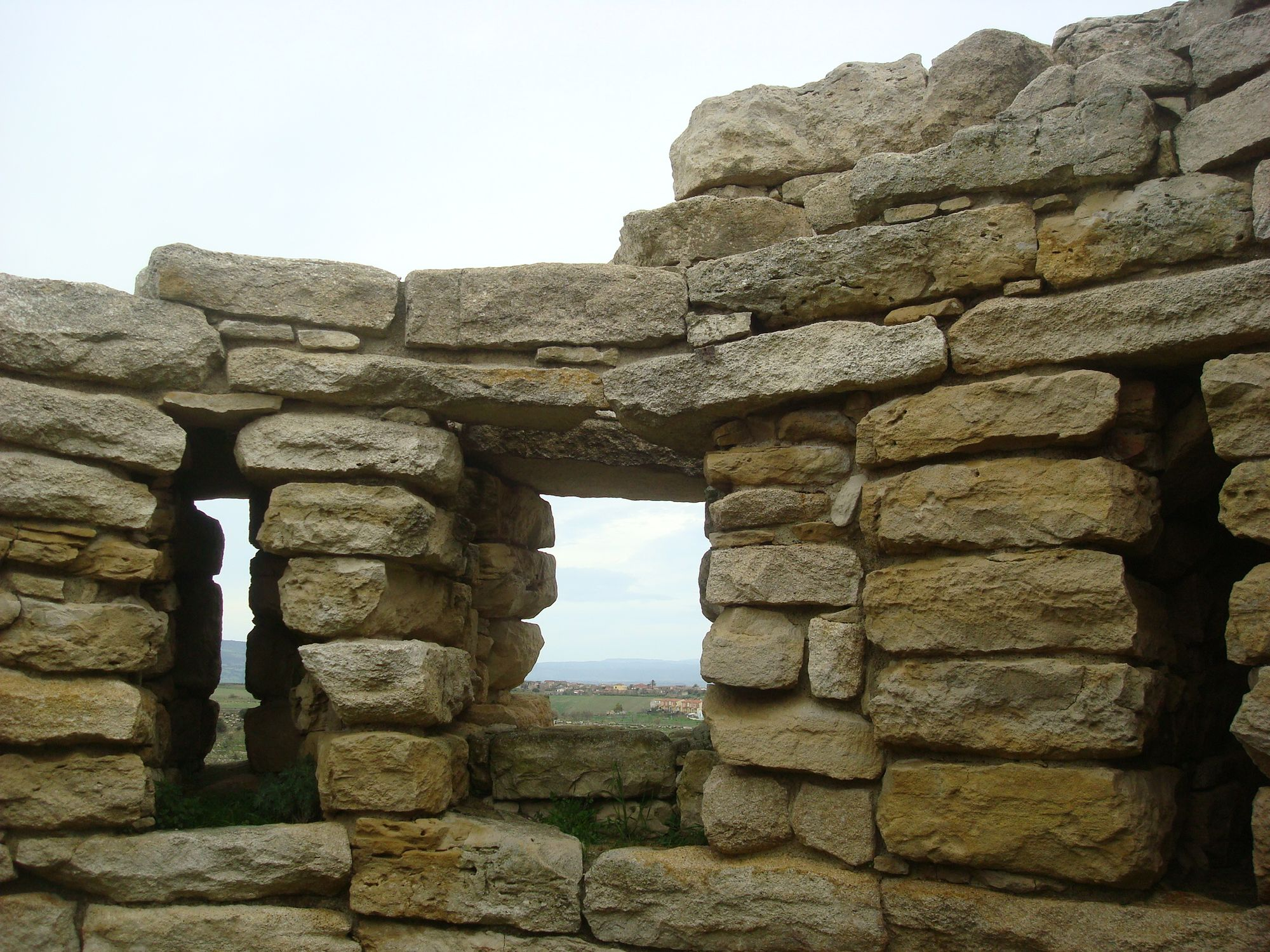

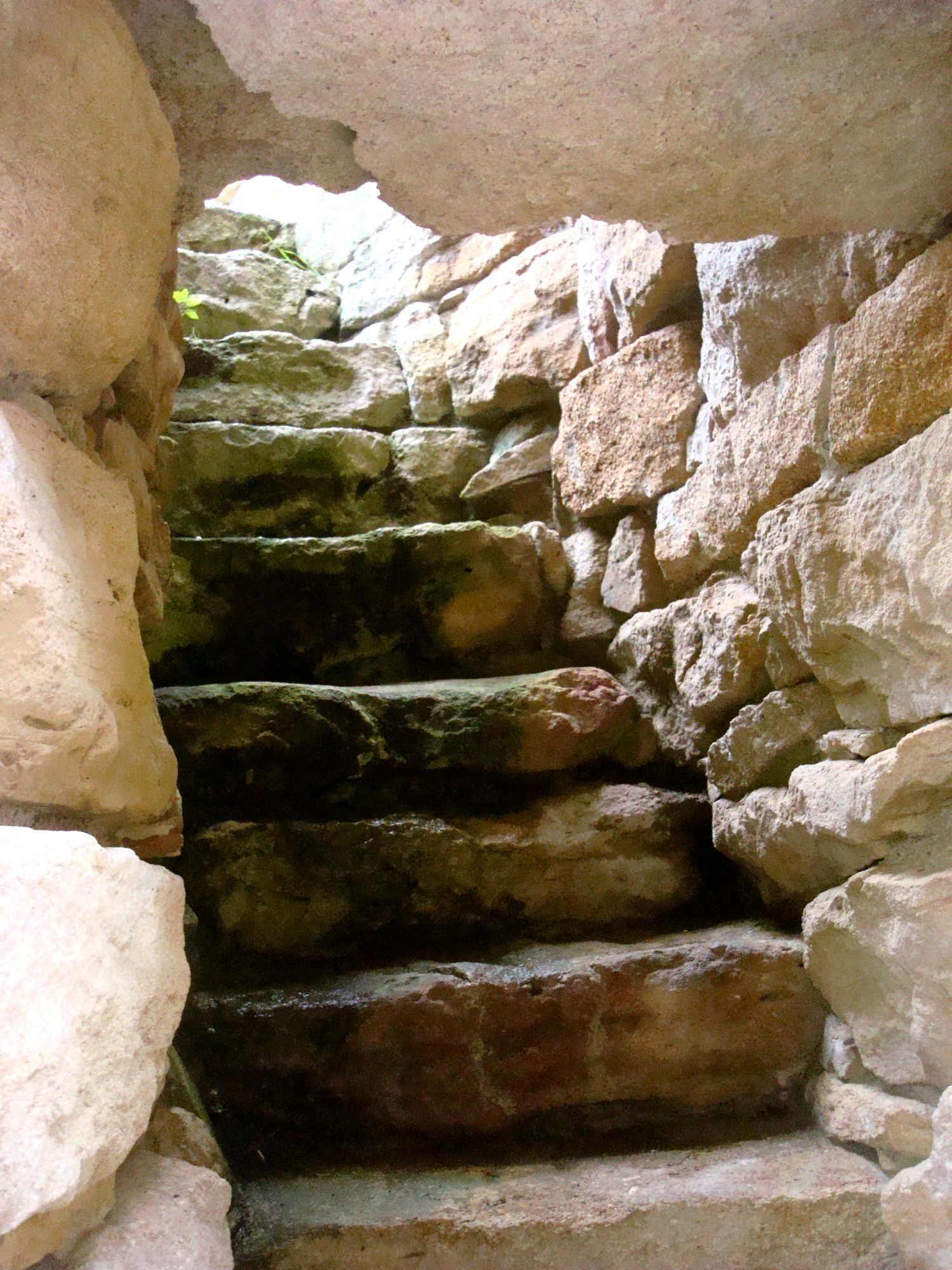

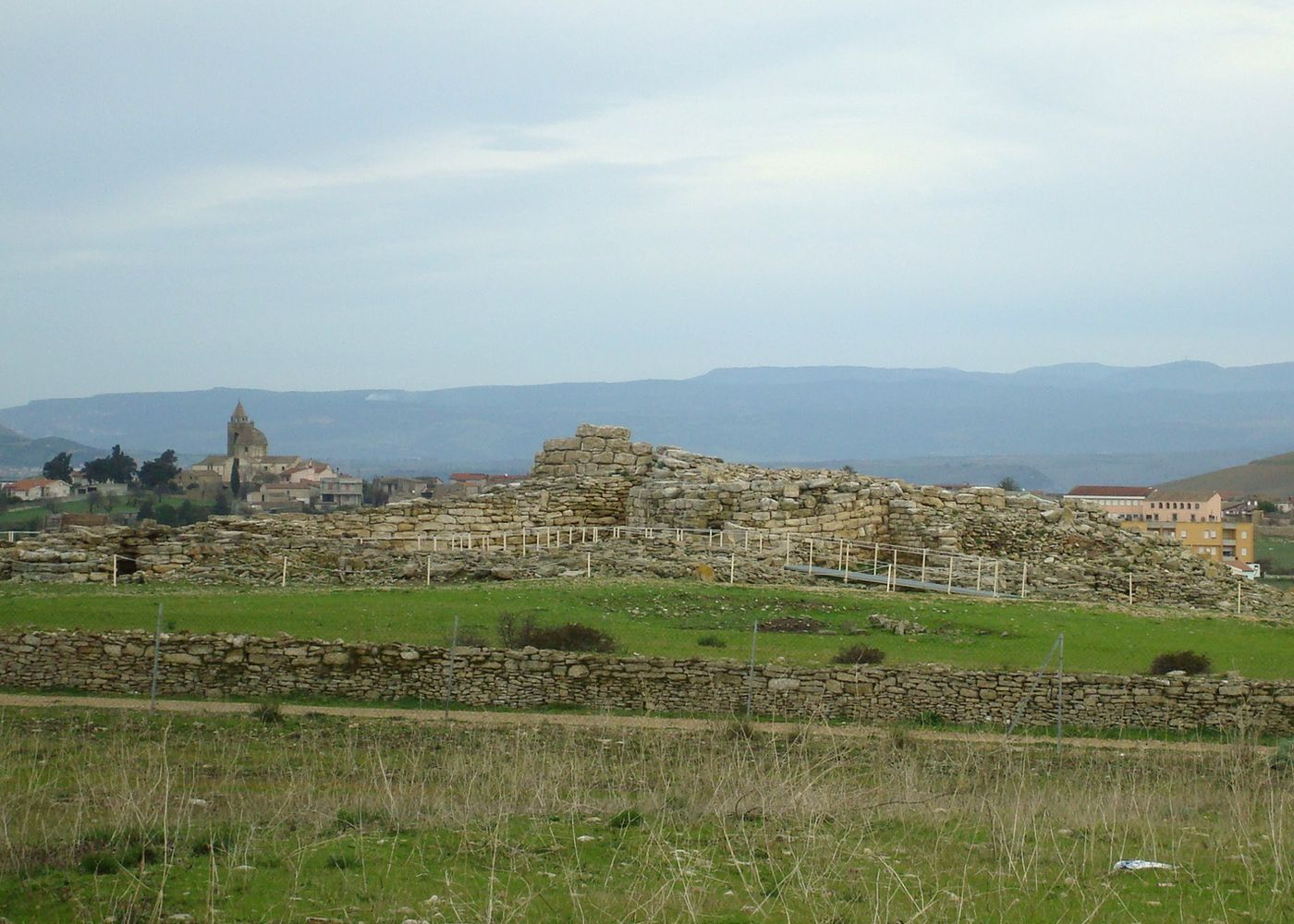

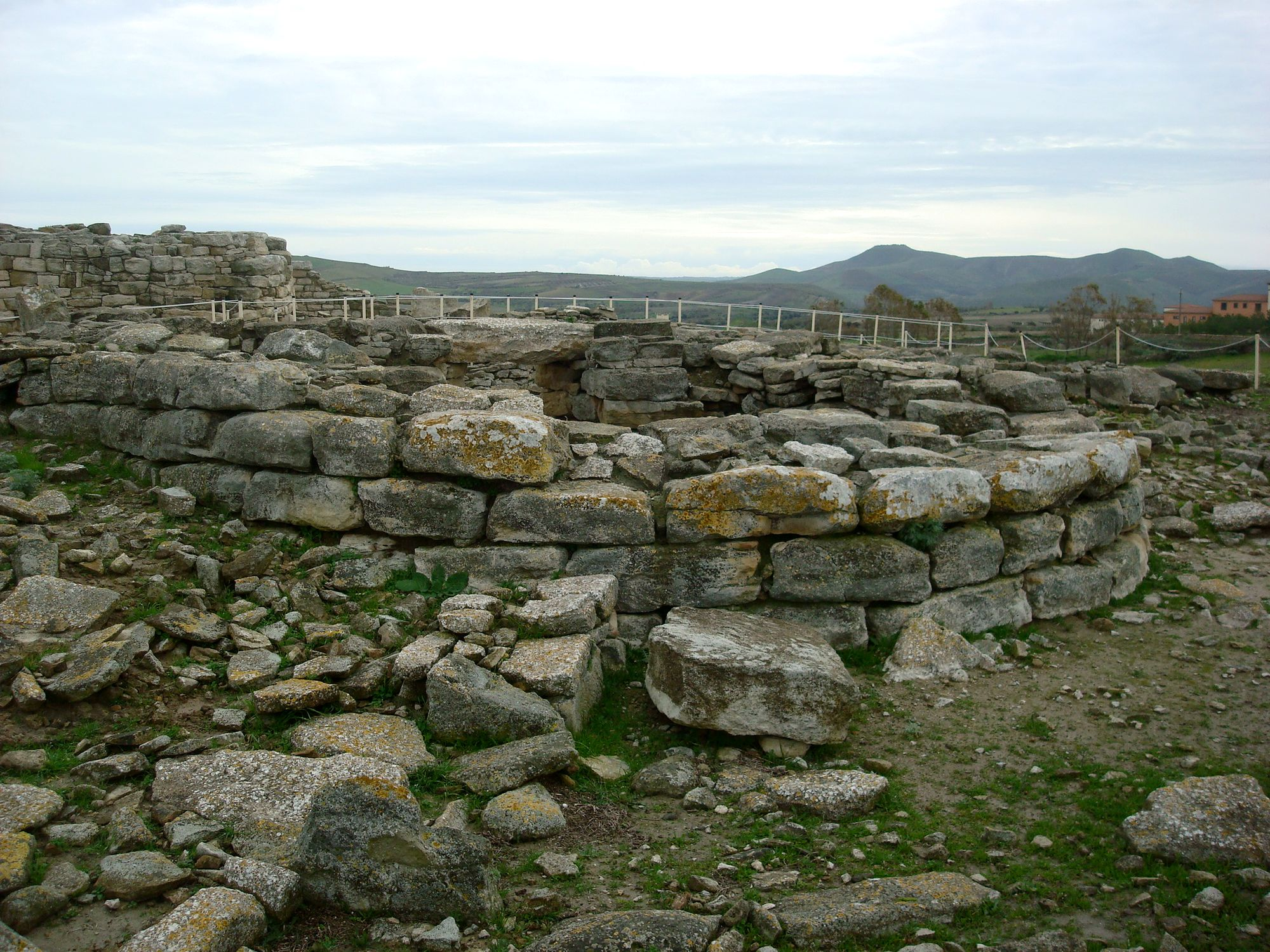

== Bibliography ==
- G. Ugas, "Un nuovo contributo per lo studio della tholos in Sardegna. La fortezza di Su Mulinu-Villanovafranca", in Nuragic Sardinia and the mycenean world, 3, a cura di M. S. Balmuth, Oxford, BAR, 1987, pp. 77–128;
- G. Ugas, "Il sacello del vano E nella fortezza nuragica di Su Mulinu-Villanovafranca (CA)", in Scienze dell'Antichità. Storia, Archeologia, Antropologia, 3–4, 1989–90, pp. 351–373;
- G. Ugas-M.C. Paderi, "Persistenze rituali e cultuali di età punica e romana nel sacello nuragico del vano e della fortezza di Su Mulinu- Villanovafranca (CA)", in L'Africa romana. Atti del III convegno di studio (Sassari, 15-17 dicembre 1989), Sassari, 1990, pp. 475–479

Tourist attractions in Sardinia]]
