= Serri, Sardinia =

Serri
- Comune
- Comune di Serri
- Location within Sardinia
- Coordinates: 39°42′N 9°9′E
- Country: Italy
- Region: Sardinia
- Metropolitan city: Cagliari (CA)

Area
  - Total: 19.1 km^{2} (7.4 sq mi)

Population (Dec. 2004)
  - Total: 725
  - Density: 38.0/km^{2} (98.3/sq mi)
- Time zone: UTC+1 (CET)
  - Summer (DST): UTC+2 (CEST)
- Postal code: 08030
- Dialing code: 0782

Serri (Latin: Biora) is a comune (municipality) in the Metropolitan City of Cagliari in the Italian region Sardinia, located about 50 kilometres (31 mi) north of Cagliari. As of 31 December 2004, it had a population of 725 and an area of 19.1 square kilometres (7.4 mi^{2}).

Serri borders the following municipalities: Escolca, Gergei, Isili, Mandas, Nurri.

== Demographic evolution ==
Historical population

| Year | Pop. | ±% |
|---|---|---|
| 1861 | 587 | — |
| 1871 | 591 | +0.7% |
| 1881 | 622 | +5.2% |
| 1901 | 645 | +3.7% |
| 1911 | 747 | +15.8% |

| Year | Pop. | ±% |
|---|---|---|
| 1921 | 797 | +6.7% |
| 1931 | 855 | +7.3% |
| 1936 | 902 | +5.5% |
| 1951 | 1,014 | +12.4% |
| 1961 | 978 | −3.6% |

| Year | Pop. | ±% |
|---|---|---|
| 1971 | 876 | −10.4% |
| 1981 | 859 | −1.9% |
| 1991 | 816 | −5.0% |
| 2001 | 760 | −6.9% |

Source: Data from ISTAT
