= Gergei =

- Comune
- Comune di Gergei
- Location within Sardinia
- Coordinates: 39°42′N 9°6′E
- Country: Italy
- Region: Sardinia
- Metropolitan city: Cagliari (CA)

Area
  - Total: 36.1 km^{2} (13.9 sq mi)
- Elevation: 374 m (1,227 ft)

Population (Dec. 2004)
  - Total: 1,413
  - Density: 39.1/km^{2} (101/sq mi)
- Time zone: UTC+1 (CET)
  - Summer (DST): UTC+2 (CEST)
- Postal code: 09055
- Dialing code: 0782

Gergei is a comune (municipality) in the Metropolitan City of Cagliari in the Italian region Sardinia, located about 50 kilometres (31 mi) north of Cagliari. As of 31 December 2004, it had a population of 1,413 and an area of 36.1 square kilometres (13.9 mi^{2}).

Gergei borders the following municipalities: Barumini, Escolca, Gesturi, Isili, Mandas, Serri.

== Demographic evolution ==
Historical population

Year	Pop.	±%
1861	2,160	—
1871	1,933	−10.5%
1881	1,927	−0.3%
1901	1,760	−8.7%
1911	1,820	+3.4%

Year	Pop.	±%
1921	1,856	+2.0%
1931	1,939	+4.5%
1936	1,925	−0.7%
1951	2,292	+19.1%
1961	2,208	−3.7%

Year	Pop.	±%
1971	1,975	−10.6%
1981	1,745	−11.6%
1991	1,587	−9.1%
2001	1,457	−8.2%

Source: Data from ISTAT
