= Seulo =

Seulo Seulu (Sardinian)
- Comune
- Comune di Seulo
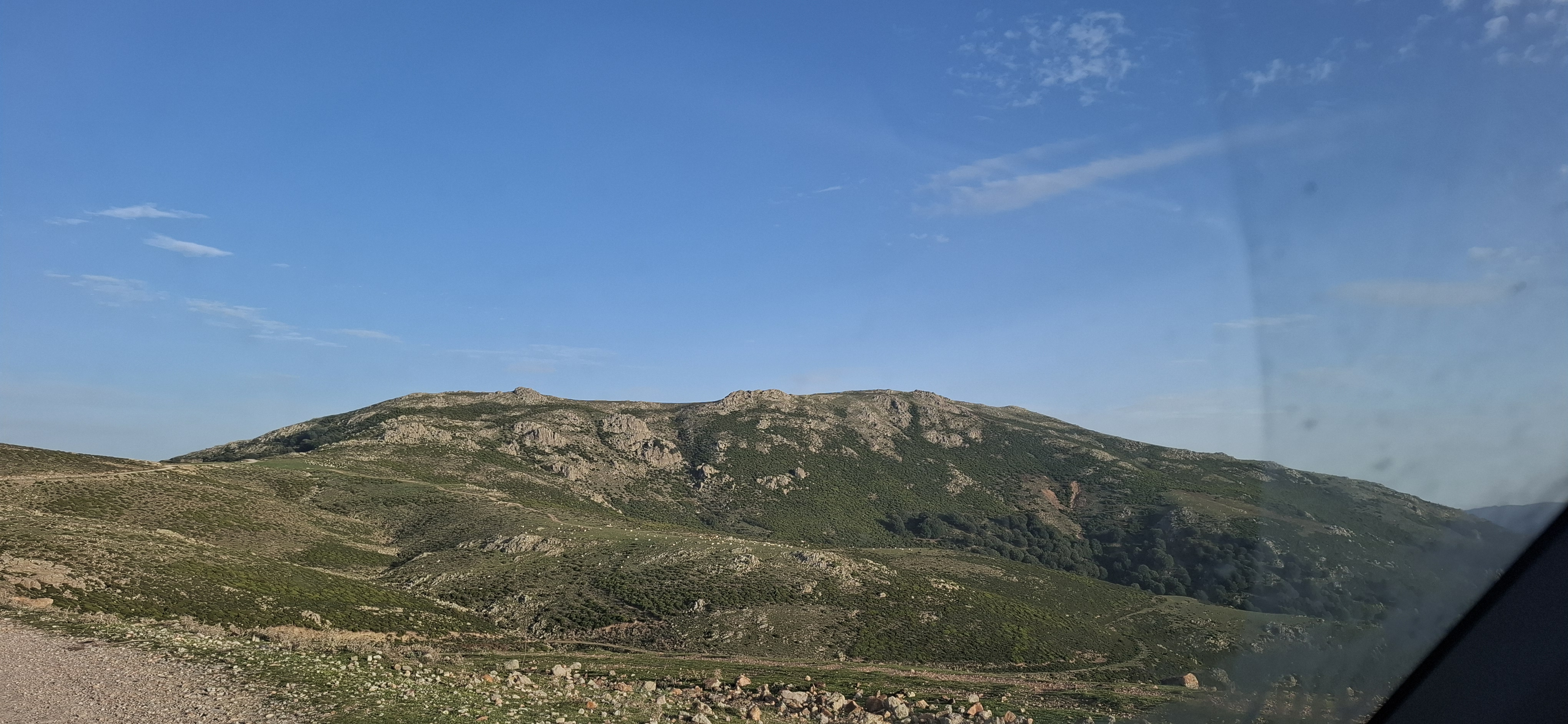
- Perdedu mountain

- Location within Sardinia
- Coordinates: 39°52′N 9°14′E
- Country: Italy
- Region: Sardinia
- Province: Nuoro (NU)

Area
  - Total: 58.79 km^{2} (22.70 sq mi)

Population (2026)
  - Total: 745
  - Density: 12.7/km^{2} (32.8/sq mi)
- Demonym: Seulesi
- Time zone: UTC+1 (CET)
  - Summer (DST): UTC+2 (CEST)
- Postal code: 08030
- Dialing code: 0782

Seulo (Sardinian: Seulu) is a town and comune (municipality) in the Province of Nuoro in the autonomous island region of Sardinia in Italy, located about 110 kilometres (68 mi) north of Cagliari. It has 745 inhabitants.

It borders the municipalities of Aritzo, Arzana, Gadoni, Sadali, Seui, and Villanova Tulo.

== Demographics ==
As of 2026, the population is 745, of which 54.2% are male, and 45.8% are female. Minors make up 11.8% of the population, and seniors make up 32.3%.

Historical population

Year	Pop.	±%
1861	714	—
1871	761	+6.6%
1881	818	+7.5%
1901	1,073	+31.2%
1911	1,260	+17.4%
1921	1,356	+7.6%
1931	1,411	+4.1%
1936	1,533	+8.6%

Year	Pop.	±%
1951	1,715	+11.9%
1961	1,772	+3.3%
1971	1,530	−13.7%
1981	1,397	−8.7%
1991	1,076	−23.0%
2001	1,023	−4.9%
2011	897	−12.3%
2021	795	−11.4%

Source: ISTAT

=== Immigration ===
As of 2025, immigrants make up 3.8% of the population. The 5 largest foreign countries of birth are Germany, Argentina, Cuba, Romania, and Slovakia.

== See also ==
- Blue Zone
