= Mandas =

- Comune
- Comune di Mandas
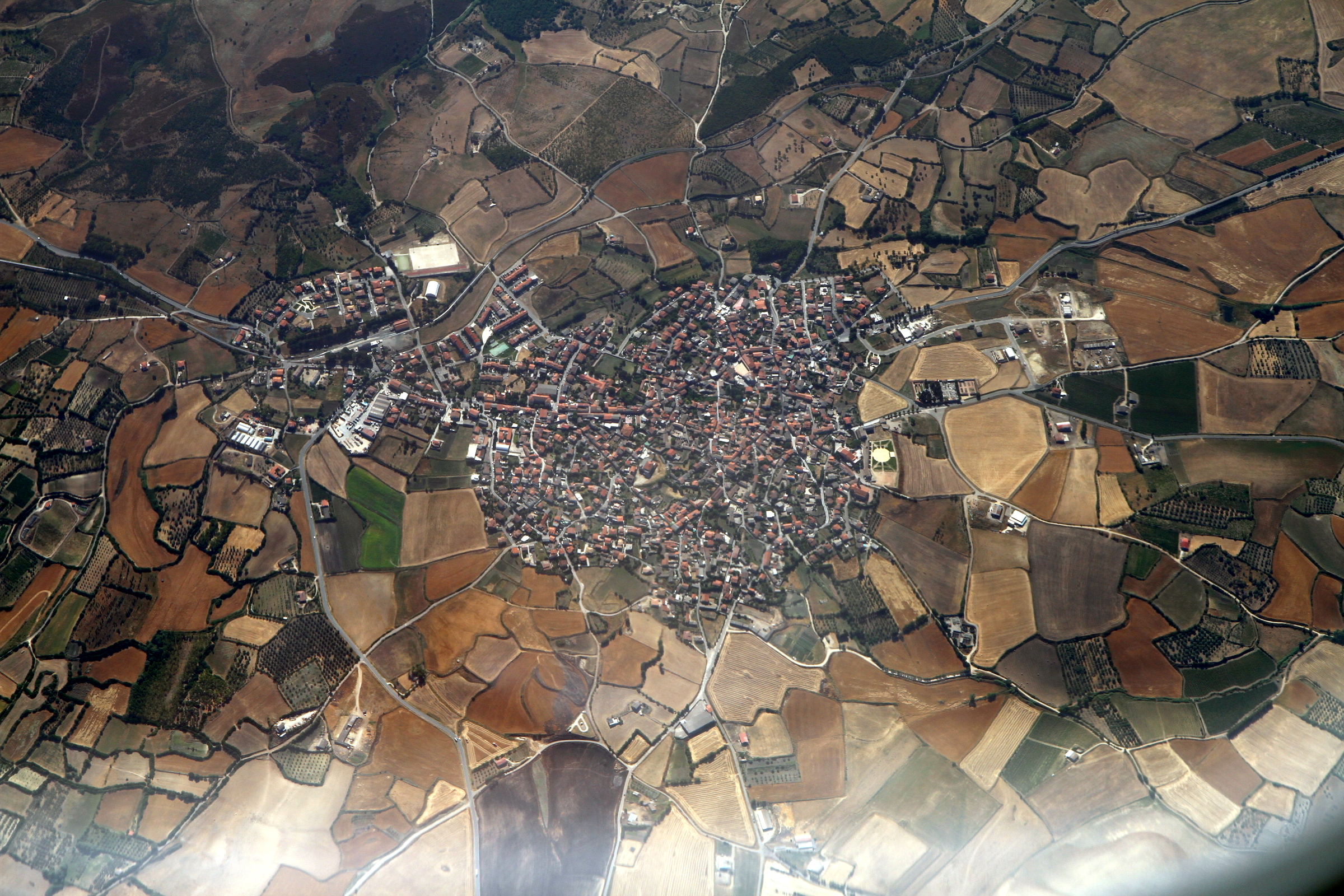
- Aerial view of the town of Mandas

- Location within Sardinia
- Coordinates: 39°39′N 9°8′E
- Country: Italy
- Region: Sardinia
- Metropolitan city: Cagliari (CA)

Area
  - Total: 45.0 km^{2} (17.4 sq mi)
- Elevation: 491 m (1,611 ft)

Population (Dec. 2004)
  - Total: 2,401
  - Density: 53.4/km^{2} (138/sq mi)
- Time zone: UTC+1 (CET)
  - Summer (DST): UTC+2 (CEST)
- Postal code: 09040
- Dialing code: 070
- Website: Official website

Mandas is a comune (municipality) in the Metropolitan City of Cagliari in the Italian region Sardinia, located about 50 kilometres (31 mi) north of Cagliari. As of 31 December 2004, it had a population of 2,401 and an area of 45.0 square kilometres (17.4 mi^{2}).

Mandas borders the following municipalities: Escolca, Gergei, Gesico, Nurri, Serri, Siurgus Donigala, Suelli.

In January 1921, D. H. Lawrence and his wife Frieda (the Queen-Bee) visited the city on their way to Sorgono. An account of their visit can be read in one of Lawrence's travel books, Sea and Sardinia (1921).

== Demographic evolution ==
Historical population

Year	Pop.	±%
1861	2,340	—
1871	2,054	−12.2%
1881	2,022	−1.6%
1901	2,104	+4.1%
1911	2,302	+9.4%

Year	Pop.	±%
1921	2,282	−0.9%
1931	2,438	+6.8%
1936	2,586	+6.1%
1951	3,047	+17.8%
1961	3,003	−1.4%

Year	Pop.	±%
1971	2,750	−8.4%
1981	2,723	−1.0%
1991	2,648	−2.8%
2001	2,464	−6.9%

Source: Data from ISTAT
