= Meana Sardo =

Meana Sardo Meana (Sardinian)
- Comune
- Comune di Meana Sardo
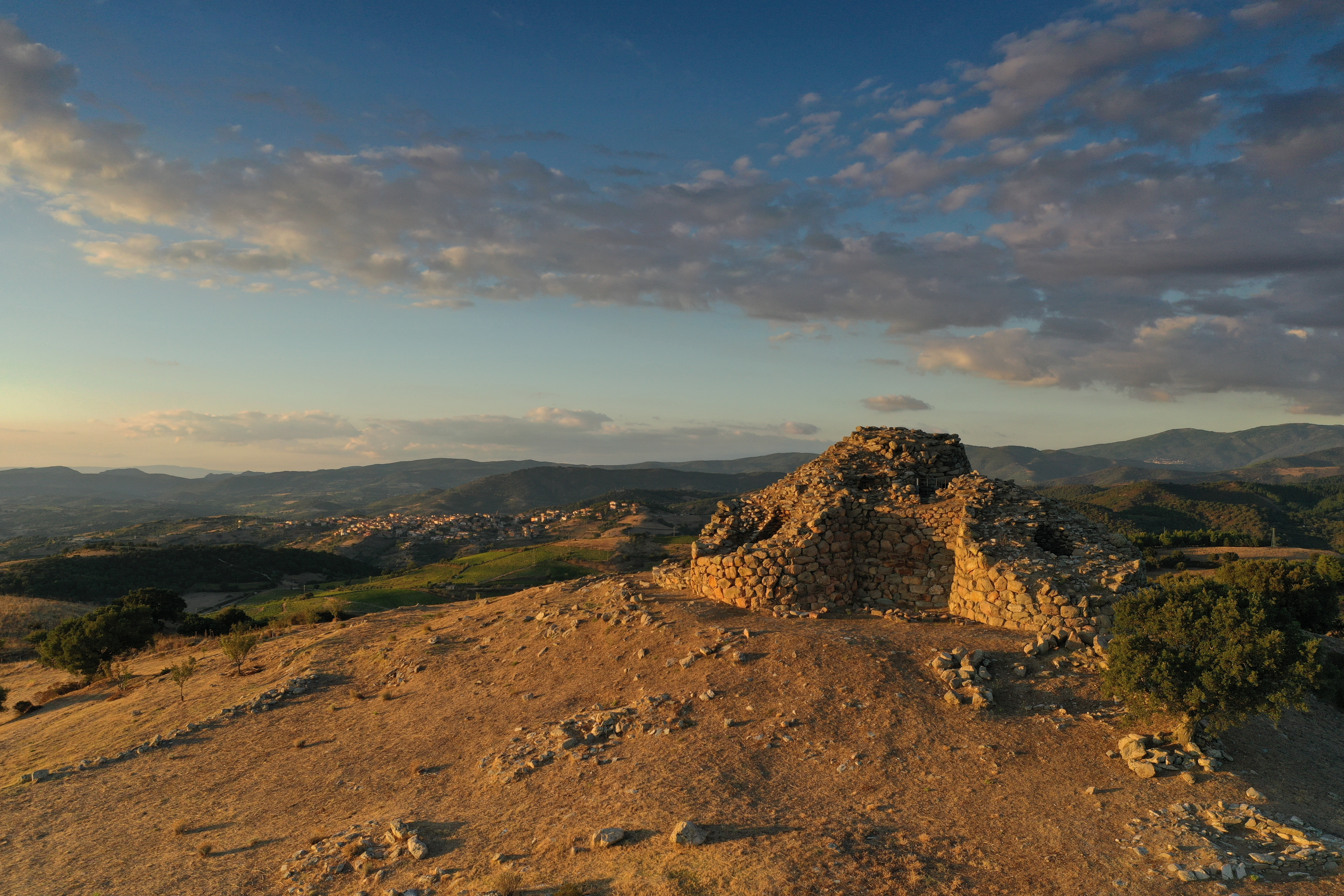
- View of Meana Sardo and Nuraghe Nolza

- Location within Sardinia
- Coordinates: 39°57′N 9°4′E
- Country: Italy
- Region: Sardinia
- Province: Province of Nuoro (NU)

Area
  - Total: 73.80 km^{2} (28.49 sq mi)
- Elevation: 700 m (2,300 ft)

Population (2026)
  - Total: 1,518
  - Density: 20.57/km^{2} (53.27/sq mi)
- Time zone: UTC+1 (CET)
  - Summer (DST): UTC+2 (CEST)
- Postal code: 08030
- Dialing code: 0784

Meana Sardo (Sardinian: Meana) is a town and comune (municipality) in the Province of Nuoro in the autonomous island region of Sardinia in Italy, located about 80 kilometres (50 mi) north of Cagliari and about 45 kilometres (28 mi) southwest of Nuoro. It has 1,518 inhabitants.

Meana Sardo borders the municipalities of Aritzo, Atzara, Belvì, Laconi, and Samugheo.

== Demographics ==
As of 2026, the population is 1,518, of which 50.2% are male, and 49.8% are female. Minors make up 9.9% of the population, and seniors make up 34.3%.

Historical population

Year	Pop.	±%
1861	1,550	—
1871	1,670	+7.7%
1881	1,800	+7.8%
1901	2,130	+18.3%
1911	2,238	+5.1%
1921	2,223	−0.7%
1931	2,316	+4.2%
1936	2,481	+7.1%

Year	Pop.	±%
1951	2,597	+4.7%
1961	2,651	+2.1%
1971	2,395	−9.7%
1981	2,243	−6.3%
1991	2,157	−3.8%
2001	2,060	−4.5%
2011	1,913	−7.1%
2021	1,624	−15.1%

Source: ISTAT

=== Immigration ===
As of 2025, immigrants make up 2.5% of the population. The 5 largest foreign countries of birth are Morocco, Romania, Germany, France, and Bosnia and Herzegovina.
