= Villanovafranca =

Villanovafranca Biddanoa Franca (Sardinian)
- Comune
- Comune di Villanovafranca
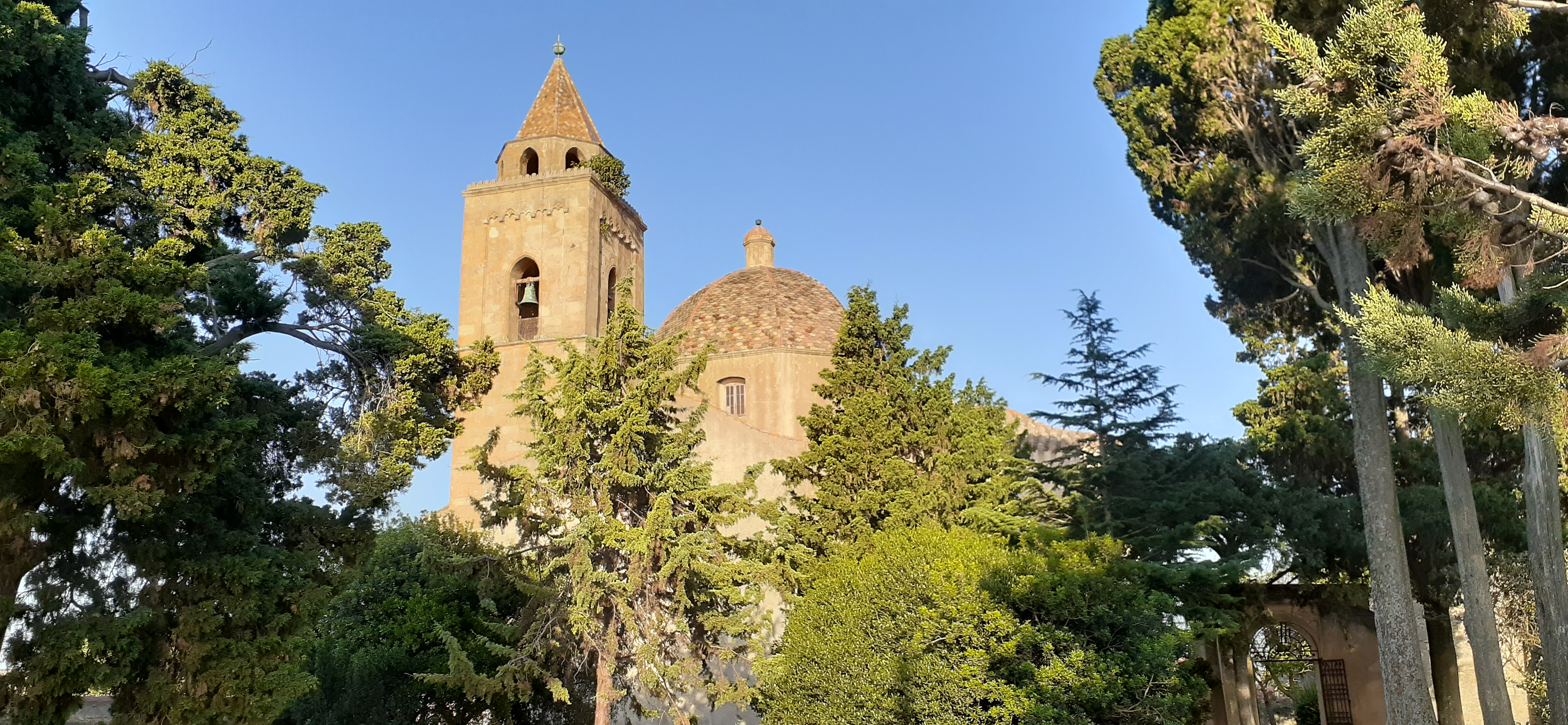
- Church of San Lorenzo

- Location within Sardinia
- Coordinates: 39°39′N 9°0′E
- Country: Italy
- Region: Sardinia
- Province: Medio Campidano

Government
  - Mayor: Matteo Castangia

Area
  - Total: 27.59 km^{2} (10.65 sq mi)
- Elevation: 292 m (958 ft)

Population (2026)
  - Total: 1,135
  - Density: 41.14/km^{2} (106.5/sq mi)
- Demonym: Villanovesi
- Time zone: UTC+1 (CET)
  - Summer (DST): UTC+2 (CEST)
- Postal code: 09020
- Dialing code: 070
- Patron saint: San Lorenzo
- Saint day: August 10th
- Website: Official website

Villanovafranca (Sardinian: Biddanoa Franca) is a town and comune (municipality) in the Province of Medio Campidano in the autonomous island region of Sardinia in Italy, located about 50 kilometres (31 miles) north of Cagliari and about 13 kilometres (8 mi) northeast of Sanluri. It has 1,135 inhabitants.

Villanovafranca borders the municipalities of Barumini, Escolca, Gesico, Guasila, Las Plassas, and Villamar.

Big attractions are the nuraghe Su Mulinu with its homonym museum and the church of San Lorenzo.

== History ==
The name Villanovafranca is believed to have its origins in the fact that the town was a tax free zone. However, there are no documents that clarify whether the villa was built with the benefits of the concessions or, like all the other Villanovae, it was born with rural function and changed its name when it acquired the concessions. However, the presence of nuragic settlements is confirmed, demonstrating that a residential center existed even before it took its current name.

The famous scholar Goffredo Casalis in his works, at the end of the list of the Marmilla villages, wrote: "[...] from Arbarei [...] to Villanovaforru and Villanovafranca. All the pre-named populations are of immemorial antiquity. Most recent of all it seems Villanovafranca up the extremity of the department and frontier of the Arborense kingdom".

Still, Pasquale Tola is the first among scholars to mention a date of foundation of the town, 1219.

The current town was built in the Aragonese period (around the 15th century), and in 1541 it was incorporated into the Barony of Las Plassas, a fief of the Zapata family. It was redeemed from the last feudal lord, Don Lorenzo Zapata Spiga Vivaldi, baron of Las Plassas, in 1839 with the suppression of the feudal system. Since then it became a municipality administered by a mayor and a municipal council.

== Demographics ==
As of 2026, the population is 1,135, of which 50.5% are male, and 49.5% are female. Minors make up 9.4% of the population, and seniors make up 33.0%.

Historical population

Year	Pop.	±%
1861	1,356	—
1871	1,166	−14.0%
1881	1,121	−3.9%
1901	1,189	+6.1%
1911	1,286	+8.2%
1921	1,369	+6.5%
1931	1,577	+15.2%
1936	1,633	+3.6%

Year	Pop.	±%
1951	2,055	+25.8%
1961	2,117	+3.0%
1971	1,759	−16.9%
1981	1,871	+6.4%
1991	1,624	−13.2%
2001	1,491	−8.2%
2011	1,433	−3.9%
2021	1,201	−16.2%

Source: ISTAT

=== Immigration ===
As of 2025, immigrants make up 3.3% of the population. The 5 largest foreign countries of birth are Romania, Belgium, the United States, France, and Germany.

== Sights ==
=== Archaeological sites ===
- Nuraghe Su Mulinu
- Nuraghe Tuppedili
- Nuraghe Trattasi
- Nuraghe Paberi
- Nuraghe Barraka is Dragonis
- Nuraghe Cuccuru S'Arriu
- Nuraghe Barbaraxinu
- Nuraghe Perdu Atzeni

=== Religious architectures ===
- Parish church of San Lorenzo, inside which there is a marble pulpit from the 1800s, numerous wooden statues (the Santus arrimaus) including that of the patron San Lorenzo, a Neapolitan work, enriched by a silver grill that characterizes it. The eighteenth-century organ is also noteworthy. Center of Villanovan religious life, its characteristic bell tower and octagonal dome are easily visible in the valleys and hills of the Marmilla, as well as in most of the municipality of Villanovafranca.
- Church of San Sebastiano
- Church of San Francesco da Paola
- Church of the Madonna della Salute, enriched with stone sculptures by the local artists Romano Porcu and Gesuino Murgia.

=== Civil architectures ===
- Soldier's house
- War memorial

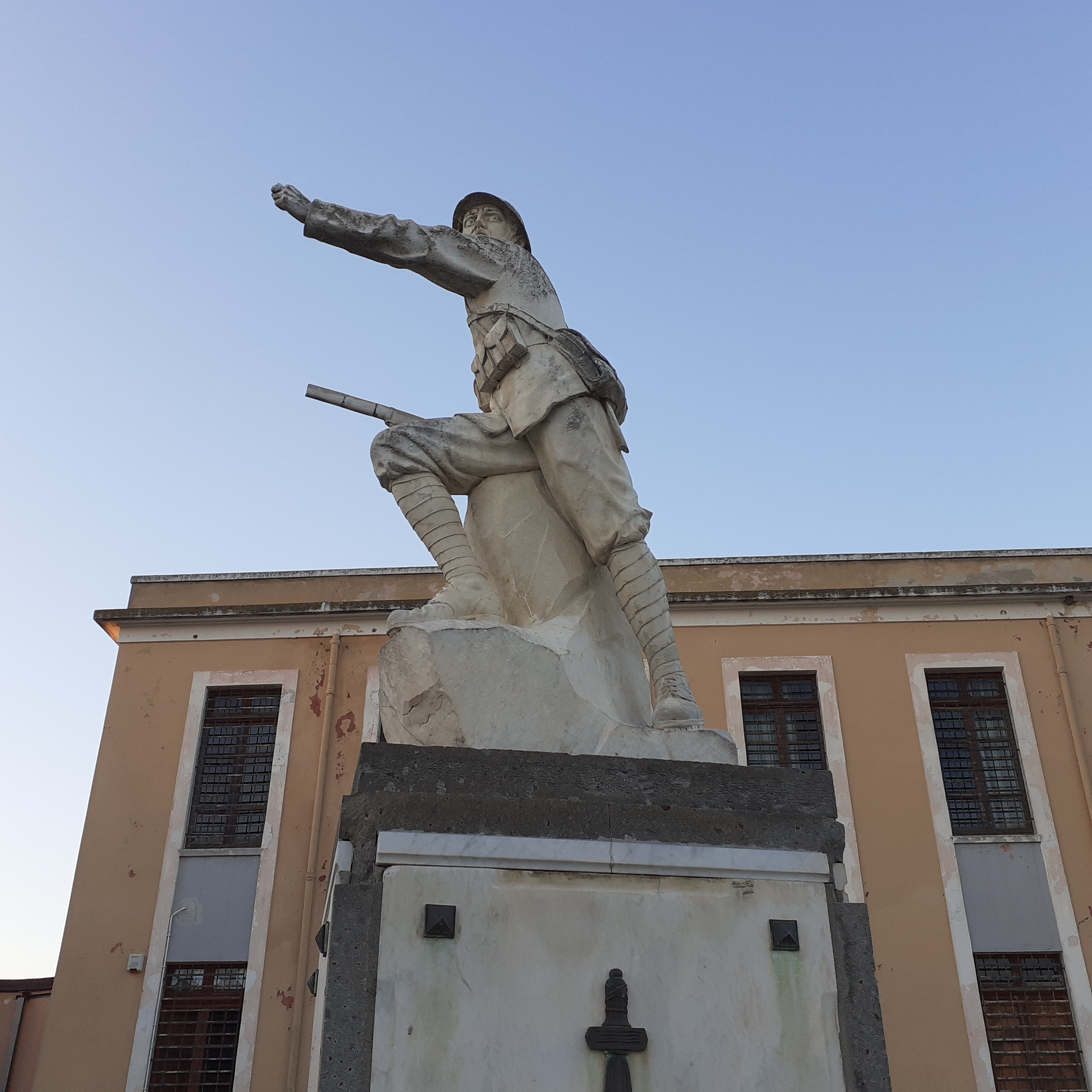
War Memorial of Villanovafranca

- Manor house Santa Cruz

== Culture ==
=== Museum ===
Su Mulinu Archaeological Museum, the former wheat storehouse or montegranatico: it was founded in 2002 and exhibits the objects found in the Su Mulinu site that span a chronological period from the Prehistoric Age to the Early Middle Ages.

== Economy ==
The production of durum wheat and the cultivation of olives, vines, almonds and saffron (a local product which has been awarded with the DOP (European Union Denomination of Protected Origin) mark) are particularly important in the municipal area. There are several agropastoral farms, some of considerable size, where pigs, sheep and cattle are raised. These local farms guarantee several jobs.
