= Escolca =

Escolca Iscroca
- Comune
- Comune di Escolca
- Location within Sardinia
- Coordinates: 39°42′N 9°7′E
- Country: Italy
- Region: Sardinia
- Metropolitan city: Cagliari (CA)
- Frazioni: San Simone

Area
  - Total: 14.7 km^{2} (5.7 sq mi)

Population (Dec. 2004)
  - Total: 652
  - Density: 44.4/km^{2} (115/sq mi)
- Demonym: Escolchesi
- Time zone: UTC+1 (CET)
  - Summer (DST): UTC+2 (CEST)
- Postal code: 08030
- Dialing code: 0782

Escolca, Iscroca in sardinian language, is a comune (municipality) in the Metropolitan City of Cagliari in the Italian region Sardinia, located about 50 kilometres (31 mi) north of Cagliari. As of 31 December 2004, it had a population of 652 and an area of 14.7 square kilometres (5.7 mi^{2}).

Geographically it is located in the Sarcidano sub-region which extends between the territories of Campidano, that of Marmilla and that of Barbagia. Inside there are three artificial lakes of Mulargia, Flumendosa and San Sebastiano. The Sarcidano territory is dotted with numerous archaeological remains, not only Nuragic.

The municipality is part of the Oil Community.

The municipality of Escolca contains the frazione (subdivision) San Simone.

Escolca borders the following municipalities: Barumini, Gergei, Gesico, Mandas, Serri, Villanovafranca.

In the 1952 the Cadoni's family opened the first and independent cinema of the village named 'Cinema Vittoria' (1952-1974).

== Demographic evolution ==
Historical population

| Year | Pop. | ±% |
|---|---|---|
| 1861 | 657 | — |
| 1871 | 624 | −5.0% |
| 1881 | 601 | −3.7% |
| 1901 | 602 | +0.2% |
| 1911 | 598 | −0.7% |

| Year | Pop. | ±% |
|---|---|---|
| 1921 | 641 | +7.2% |
| 1931 | 735 | +14.7% |
| 1936 | 775 | +5.4% |
| 1951 | 929 | +19.9% |
| 1961 | 983 | +5.8% |

| Year | Pop. | ±% |
|---|---|---|
| 1971 | 876 | −10.9% |
| 1981 | 805 | −8.1% |
| 1991 | 759 | −5.7% |
| 2001 | 692 | −8.8% |

Source: Data from ISTAT
