= Aritzo =

- Comune
- Comune di Aritzo
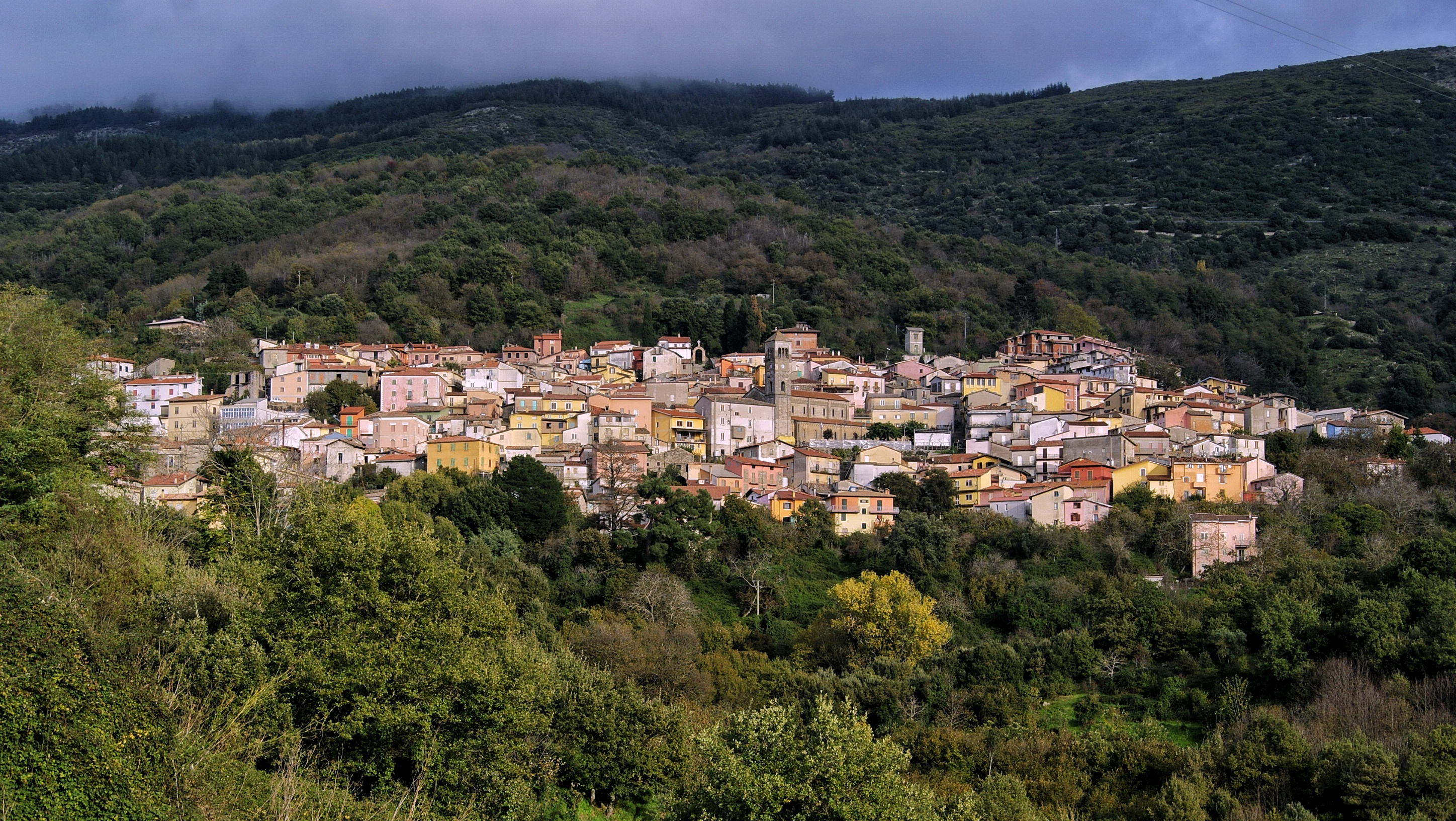
- View of Aritzo

- Location of Aritzo in Sardinia
- Coordinates: 39°57′N 9°12′E
- Country: Italy
- Region: Sardinia
- Province: Nuoro

Government
  - Mayor: Paolo Fontana

Area
  - Total: 75.58 km^{2} (29.18 sq mi)
- Elevation: 796 m (2,612 ft)

Population (2026)
  - Total: 1,272
  - Density: 16.83/km^{2} (43.59/sq mi)
- Demonym: Aritzesi
- Time zone: UTC+1 (CET)
  - Summer (DST): UTC+2 (CEST)
- Postal code: 08031
- Dialing code: 0784
- Website: Official website

Aritzo (Sardinian: Arìtzo) is a town and comune (municipality) in the Province of Nuoro in the autonomous island region of Sardinia in Italy, located about 80 kilometres (50 mi) north of Cagliari and about 40 kilometres (25 mi) southwest of Nuoro. It has 1,272 inhabitants.

Aritzo borders the municipalities of Arzana, Belvì, Desulo, Gadoni, Laconi, Meana Sardo, and Seulo.

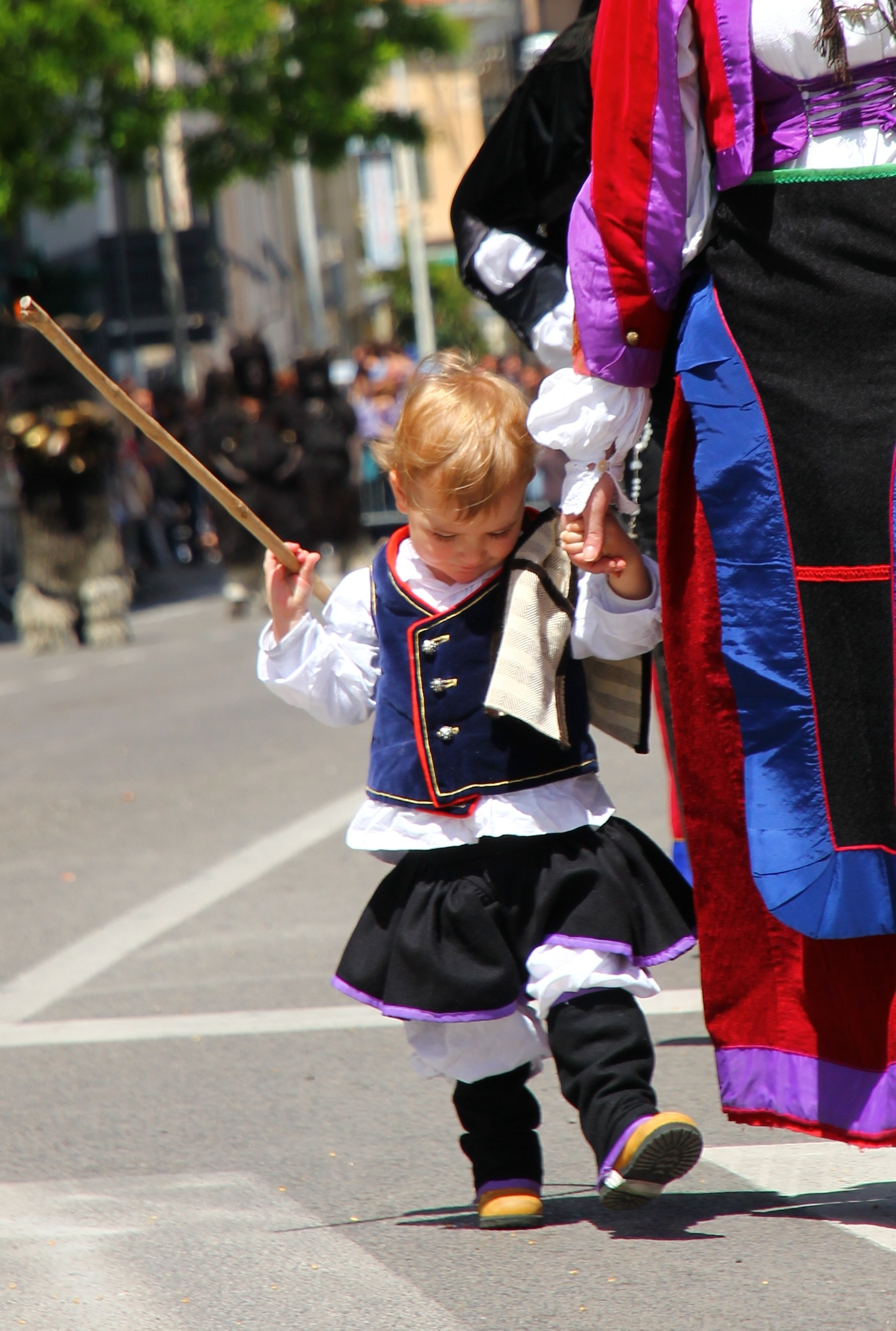
A child wearing the traditional cloth from Aritzo

== Demographics ==
As of 2026, the population is 1,272, of which 59.4% are male, and 40.6% are female. Minors make up 10.4% of the population, and seniors make up 27.4%.

Historical population

Year	Pop.	±%
1861	1,971	—
1871	2,125	+7.8%
1881	2,073	−2.4%
1901	2,023	−2.4%
1911	2,128	+5.2%
1921	2,228	+4.7%
1931	2,457	+10.3%
1936	2,445	−0.5%

Year	Pop.	±%
1951	2,411	−1.4%
1961	2,469	+2.4%
1971	2,226	−9.8%
1981	1,854	−16.7%
1991	1,692	−8.7%
2001	1,544	−8.7%
2011	1,328	−14.0%
2021	1,237	−6.9%

Source: ISTAT

=== Immigration ===
As of 2025, immigrants make up 12.3% of the population. The 5 largest foreign countries of birth are Pakistan, Bangladesh, Afghanistan, Nigeria, and Burkina Faso.

== Gallery ==
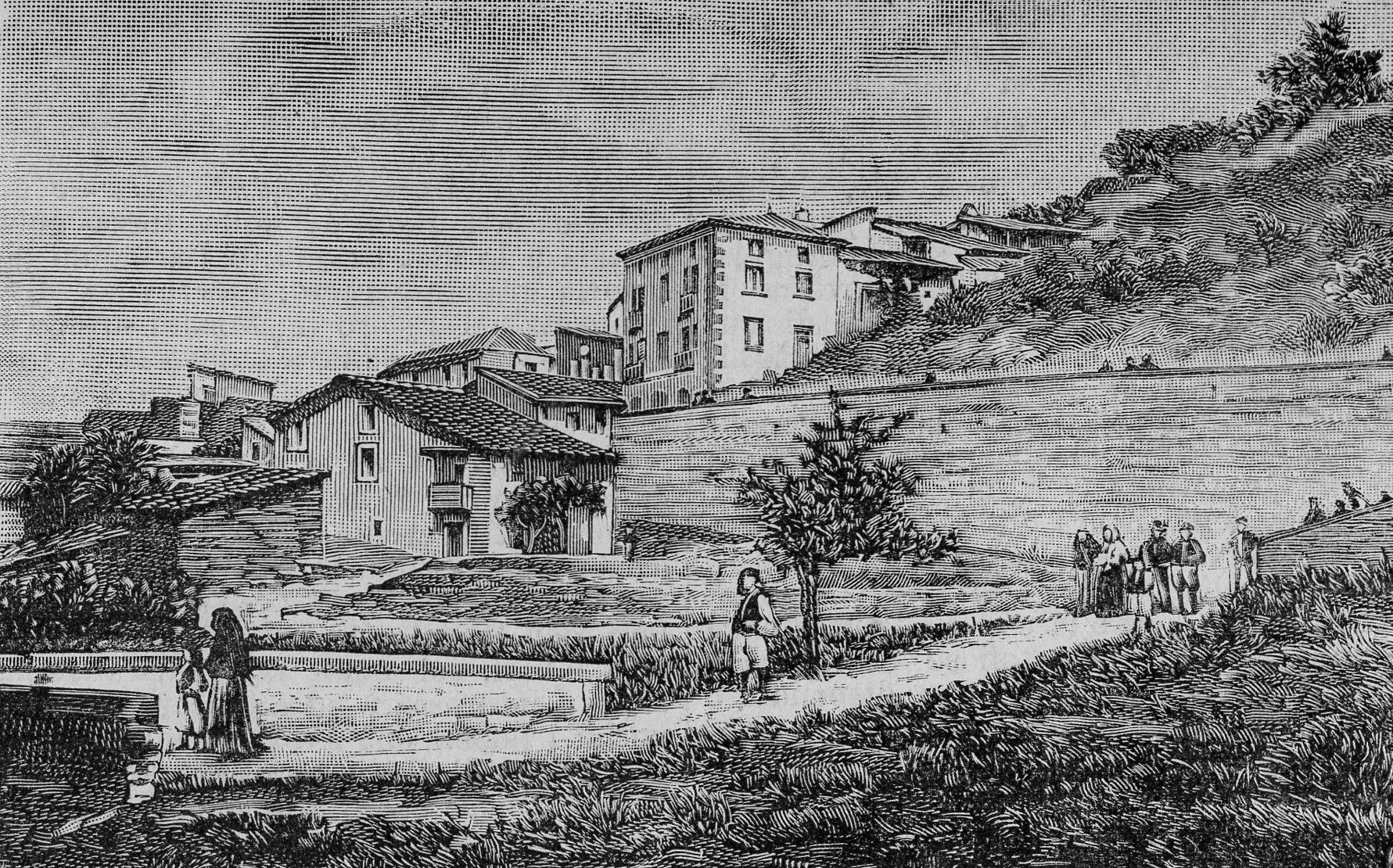
Aritzo in 1901

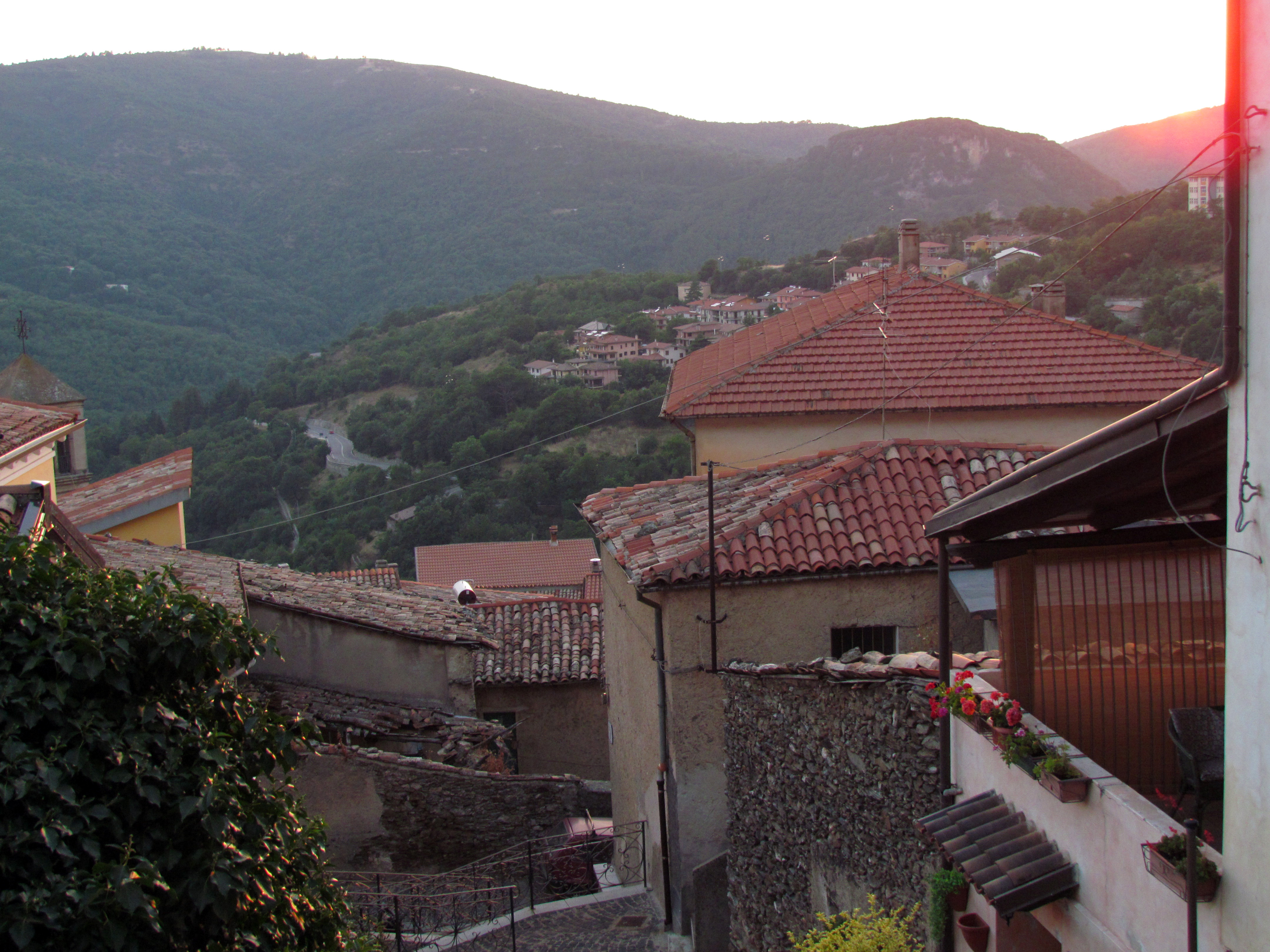
Houses in Aritzo

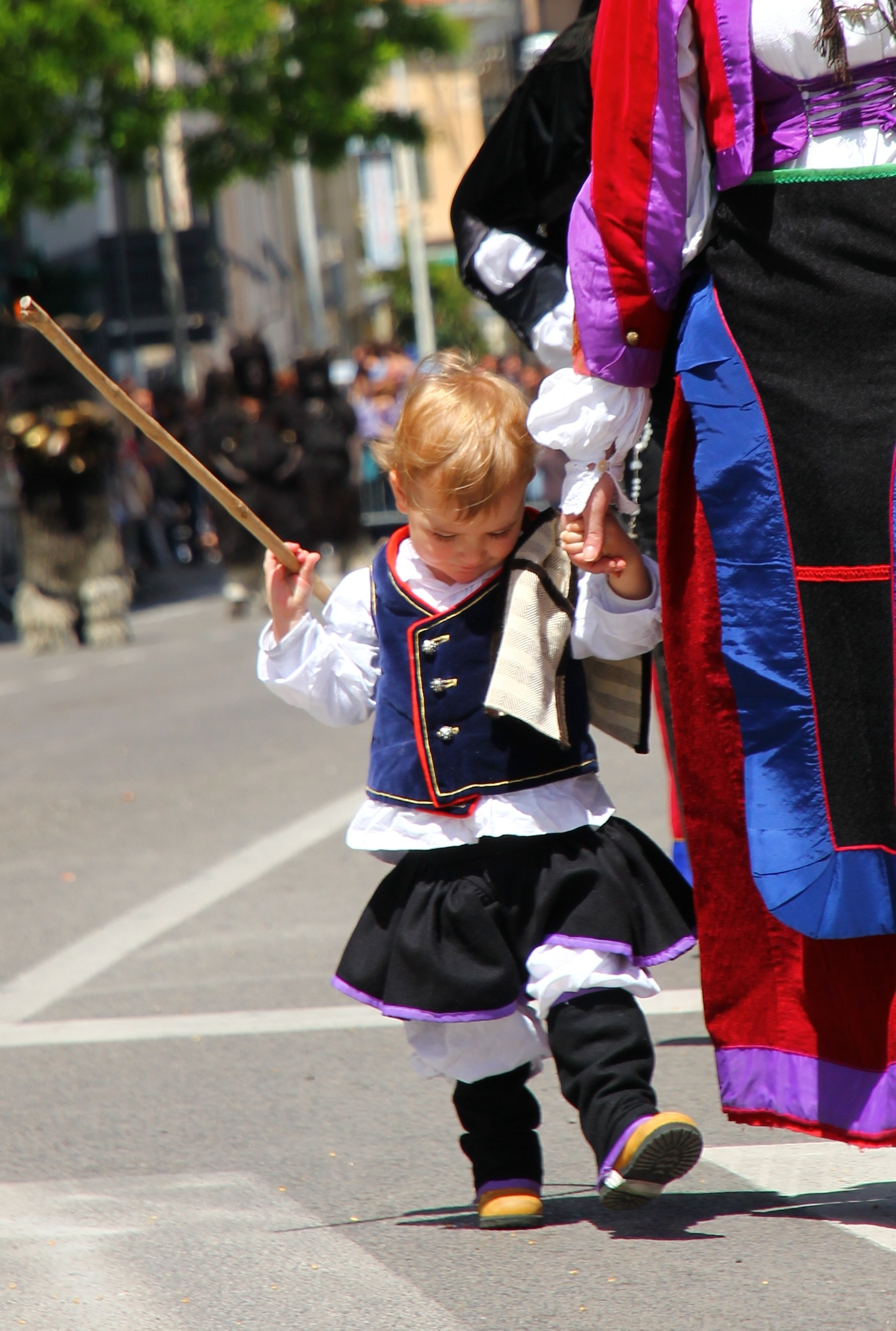
A boy wearing local traditional clothes
