= Villanova Tulo =

Villanova Tulo Biddanoa de tulu
- Comune
- Comune di Villanova Tulo
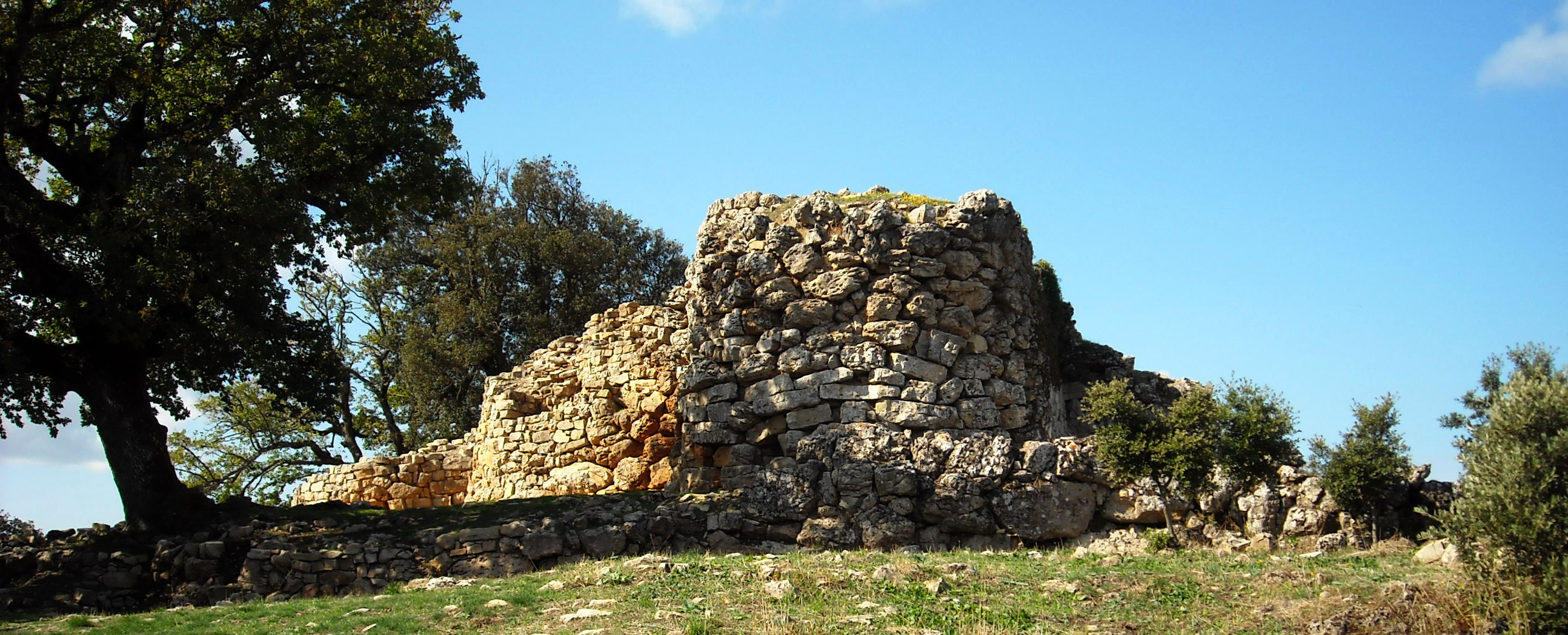
- Nuraghe Adoni

- Coat of arms

- Location within Sardinia
- Coordinates: 39°47′N 9°13′E
- Country: Italy
- Region: Sardinia
- Metropolitan city: Cagliari (CA)

Government
  - Mayor: Giuseppe Loddo

Area
  - Total: 40.3 km^{2} (15.6 sq mi)
- Elevation: 600 m (2,000 ft)

Population (31 December 2010)
  - Total: 1,164
  - Density: 28.9/km^{2} (74.8/sq mi)
- Time zone: UTC+1 (CET)
  - Summer (DST): UTC+2 (CEST)
- Postal code: 08030
- Dialing code: 0782

Villanova Tulo (Sardinian: Bidda Noa de Tulu) is a comune (municipality) in the Metropolitan City of Cagliari, Italy, about 80 kilometres (50 miles) north of Cagliari.

Villanova Tulo borders the municipalities of Gadoni, Isili, Laconi, Nurri, Sadali, and Seulo.
