= Laconi =

Laconi Làconi (Sardinian)
- Comune
- Comune di Laconi
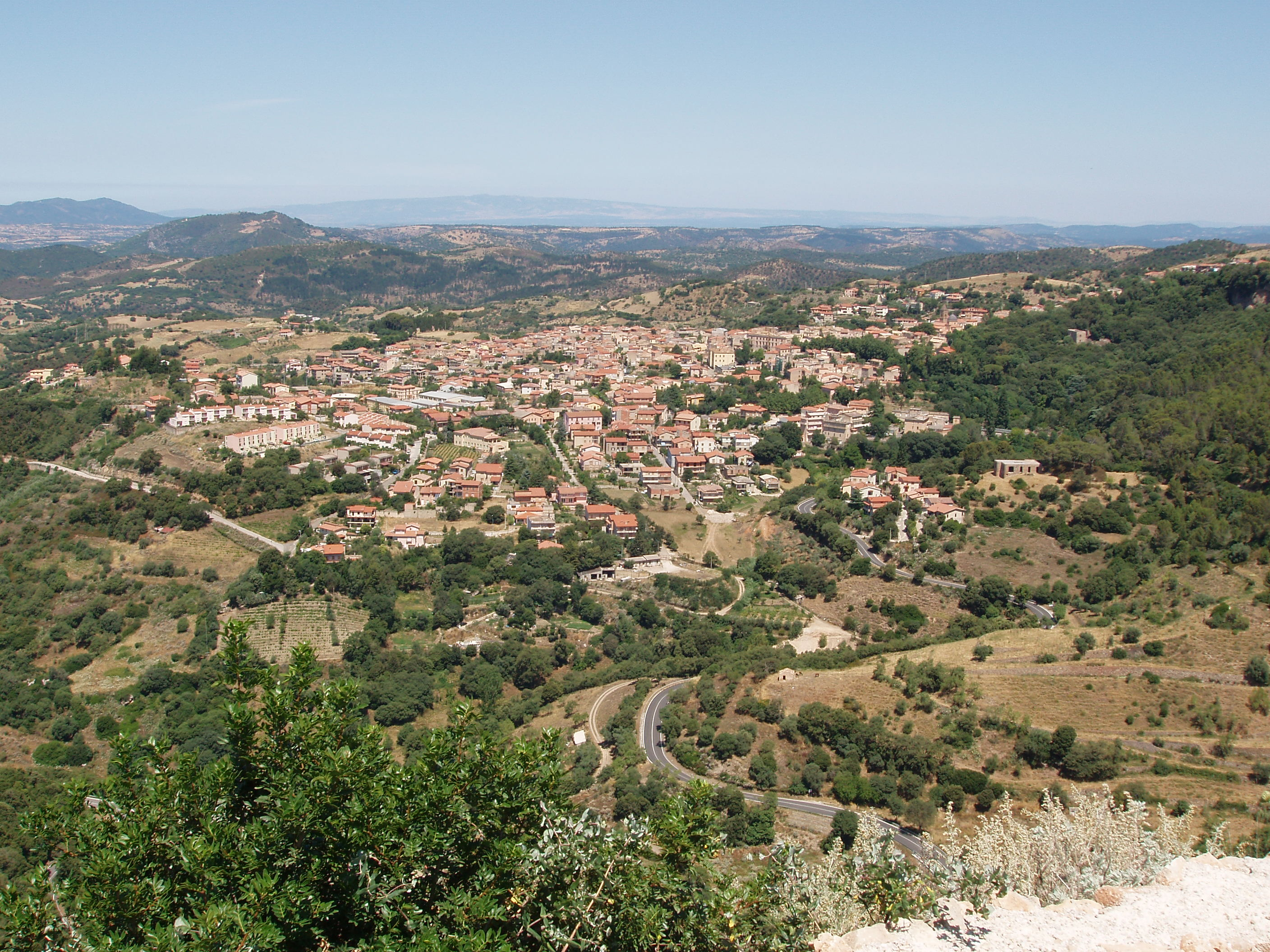
- View of Laconi

- Location within Sardinia
- Coordinates: 39°51′N 9°3′E
- Country: Italy
- Region: Sardinia
- Province: Oristano (OR)
- Frazioni: Crastu, Santa Sofia, Su Lau

Government
  - Mayor: Ignazio Paolo Pisu

Area
  - Total: 124.75 km^{2} (48.17 sq mi)
- Elevation: 555 m (1,821 ft)

Population (2026)
  - Total: 1,589
  - Density: 12.74/km^{2} (32.99/sq mi)
- Demonym: Laconesi
- Time zone: UTC+1 (CET)
  - Summer (DST): UTC+2 (CEST)
- Postal code: 08034
- Dialing code: 0782

Laconi (Sardinian: Làconi) is a town and comune (municipality) in the Province of Oristano in the autonomous island region of Sardinia in Italy, located about 70 kilometres (43 miles) north of Cagliari and about 40 kilometres (25 miles) east of Oristano. It has 1,589 inhabitants.

Laconi borders the municipalities of Aritzo, Asuni, Gadoni, Genoni, Isili, Meana Sardo, Nuragus, Nurallao, Nureci, Samugheo, Senis, and Villanova Tulo.

== Demographics ==
As of 2026, the population is 1,589, of which 49.5% are male, and 50.5% are female. Minors make up 9.3% of the population, and seniors make up 37.8%.

Historical population

Year	Pop.	±%
1861	2,204	—
1871	2,149	−2.5%
1881	1,981	−7.8%
1901	2,145	+8.3%
1911	2,114	−1.4%
1921	2,050	−3.0%
1931	2,167	+5.7%
1936	2,231	+3.0%

Year	Pop.	±%
1951	2,621	+17.5%
1961	3,079	+17.5%
1971	2,927	−4.9%
1981	2,616	−10.6%
1991	2,459	−6.0%
2001	2,302	−6.4%
2011	2,008	−12.8%
2021	1,685	−16.1%

Source: ISTAT

=== Immigration ===
As of 2025, immigrants make up 1.7% of the total population. The 5 largest foreign countries of birth are Germany, Romania, Kyrgyzstan, Switzerland, and the United Kingdom.
