= Gadoni =

Gadoni Adòni (Sardinian)
- Comune
- Comune di Gadoni
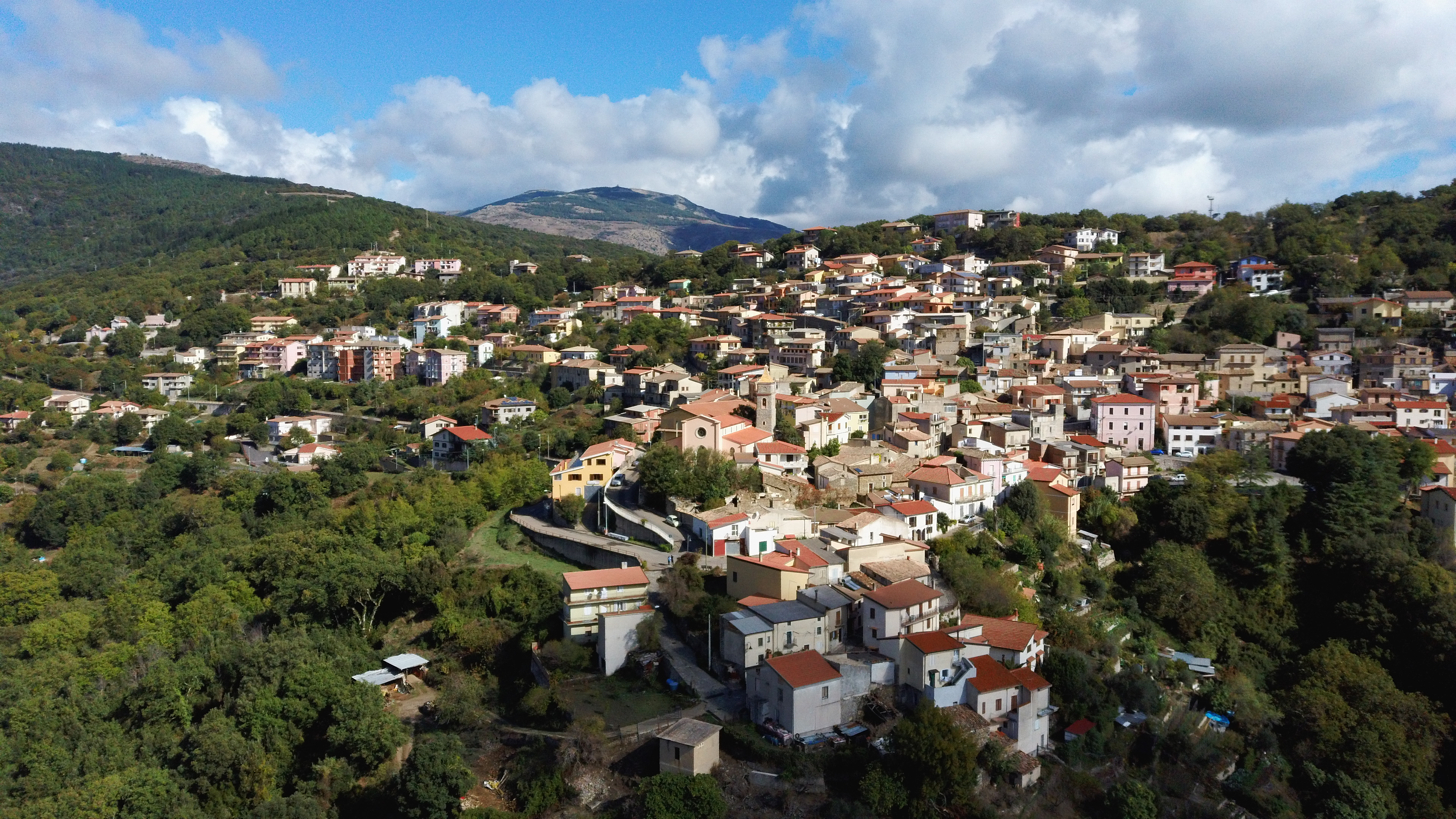
- View of Gadoni

- Location within Sardinia
- Coordinates: 39°55′N 9°11′E
- Country: Italy
- Region: Sardinia
- Province: Province of Nuoro (NU)
- Frazioni: Funtana Raminosa

Area
  - Total: 43.44 km^{2} (16.77 sq mi)
- Elevation: 696 m (2,283 ft)

Population (2026)
  - Total: 638
  - Density: 14.7/km^{2} (38.0/sq mi)
- Time zone: UTC+1 (CET)
  - Summer (DST): UTC+2 (CEST)
- Postal code: 08030
- Dialing code: 0784

Gadoni (Sardinian: Adòni) is a village and comune (municipality) in the Province of Nuoro in the autonomous island region of Sardinia in Italy, located about 80 kilometres (50 mi) north of Cagliari and about 45 kilometres (28 mi) southwest of Nuoro. It has 638 inhabitants.

The municipality of Gadoni contains the frazione (subdivision, a village or hamlet) of Funtana Raminosa.

Gadoni borders the municipalities of Aritzo, Laconi, Seulo, and Villanova Tulo.

== Demographics ==
As of 2026, the population is 638, of which 48.1% are male, and 51.9% are female. Minors make up 8.3% of the population, and seniors make up 40.9%.

Historical population

Year	Pop.	±%
1861	693	—
1871	716	+3.3%
1881	731	+2.1%
1901	887	+21.3%
1911	1,024	+15.4%
1921	1,151	+12.4%
1931	1,174	+2.0%
1936	1,239	+5.5%

Year	Pop.	±%
1951	1,415	+14.2%
1961	1,628	+15.1%
1971	1,361	−16.4%
1981	1,253	−7.9%
1991	1,153	−8.0%
2001	990	−14.1%
2011	886	−10.5%
2021	703	−20.7%

Source: ISTAT

=== Immigration ===
As of 2025, immigrants make up 3.3% of the population. The 5 largest foreign countries of birth are France, Morocco, Switzerland, Equatorial Guinea, and Germany.
