= Sarcidano =

Breed of horse

Sarcidano Horse
- Other names: Cavallo del Sarcidano, Cavallo Sarcidanese
- Country of origin: Italy, native to Sardinia

Breed standards
- Associzione Italiana Allevatori

The Sarcidano, Italian: Cavallo del Sarcidano, is a rare Italian breed of semi-feral horse originating from the Altopiano del Sarcidano in the comune of Laconi, in Oristano Province of the Mediterranean island of Sardinia. It is one of the fifteen indigenous horse "breeds of limited distribution" recognised by the AIA, the Italian breeders' association.

== History ==
The Sarcidano appears to have ancient Spanish ancestry in common with the Andalusian horse. Studies by Valiati (1997) and by Bell (1999) of transferrins are reported to confirm common ancestry with the Iberian horse of the sixteenth century. A 1996 study of polymorphism in protease inhibitors concluded that "a genetic correlation could be present between Sarcidano Horses and ancient Spanish horses as reported by historical documents about horse breeding in Sardinia". The "constant" presence of the seventh molar in the upper jaw is cited as evidence of ancient origin by Baccino, who notes that this characteristic is shared by only a few ancient breeds such as the Exmoor Pony and the Caspian Horse; he also notes the presence in the Sarcidano of an allele otherwise seen only in Przewalski's Horse.

In 1999 a group of fifteen of the horses was acquired by the comune of Laconi from a private owner; this herd lives in the state-owned forest of Funtanamela, on the Sarcidano plateau, and in 2006 numbered approximately 100 horses. A second herd, privately owned, also lives in the same area, while a third group is held by the Istituto di Incremento Ippico della Sardegna (Sardinian horse-breeding institution) of Ozieri, at Foresta Burgos in central northern Sardinia. In 2007, the total Sarcidano horse population was approximately 190, of which 78 were mares.

The Sarcidano was recognised as a breed by Ministerial Decree No. 24347, dated 5 November 2003; the stud-book was established in 2005, and is held by the Associazione Provinciale Allevatori (regional breeders' association) of Nuoro.

== Characteristics ==
According to the breed standard, the Sarcidano may be black, bay, or grey; other coat colours are excluded from registration. The height range for males is 125–145 cm (12.1–14.1 hands), the girth 140–160 cm (55–63 in) and the cannon circumference 14–17 cm (5.5–6.7 in); for females the height measures 115–135 cm (11.1–13.1 hands), the girth 120–150 cm (47–59 in) and the cannon 13–16 cm (5.1–6.3 in). Horses over 148 cm (14.2 hands) at 30 months may not be registered.

The head is rather heavy and roughly set on, the profile straight, the ears mobile and the eyes and nostrils large. The neck is muscular, the mane thick. The shoulder is fairly straight, the withers high and the croup short but muscular. The legs are short, strong and reasonably well conformed, the joints are broad, the hooves are strong but tend to be cylindrical. The action is lively and sure-footed.

It has a lively and responsive nature, and adapts well to equestrian uses; it is frugal and resistant.

Supernumerary premolars are frequently present on both sides of the upper jaw.

== Use ==
No use of the Sarcidano horse is documented. In 2001 the possibility of starting a few horses for use in trekking was being considered.
