= Baressa =

Baressa Aressa
- Comune
- Comune di Baressa
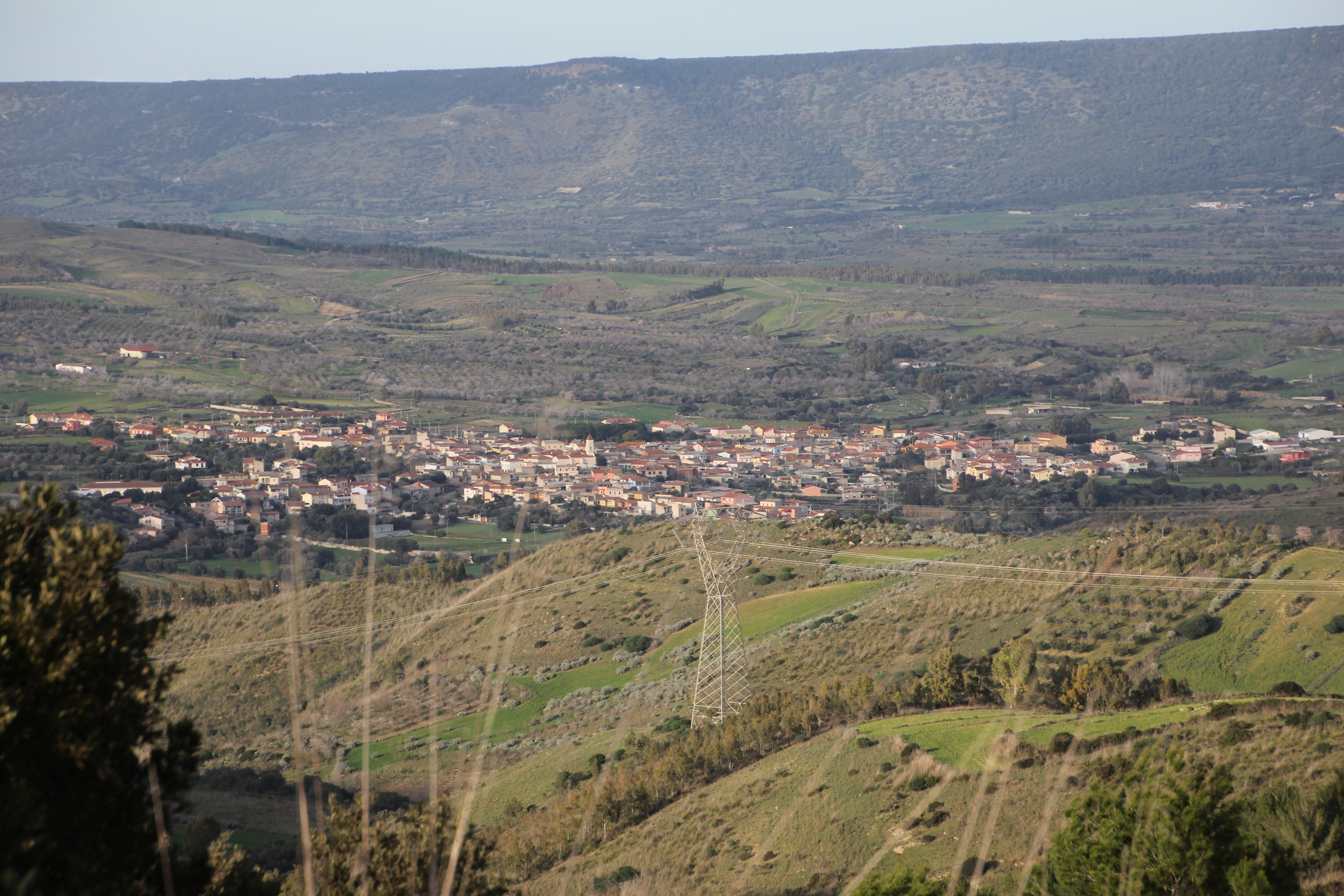
- View of Baressa

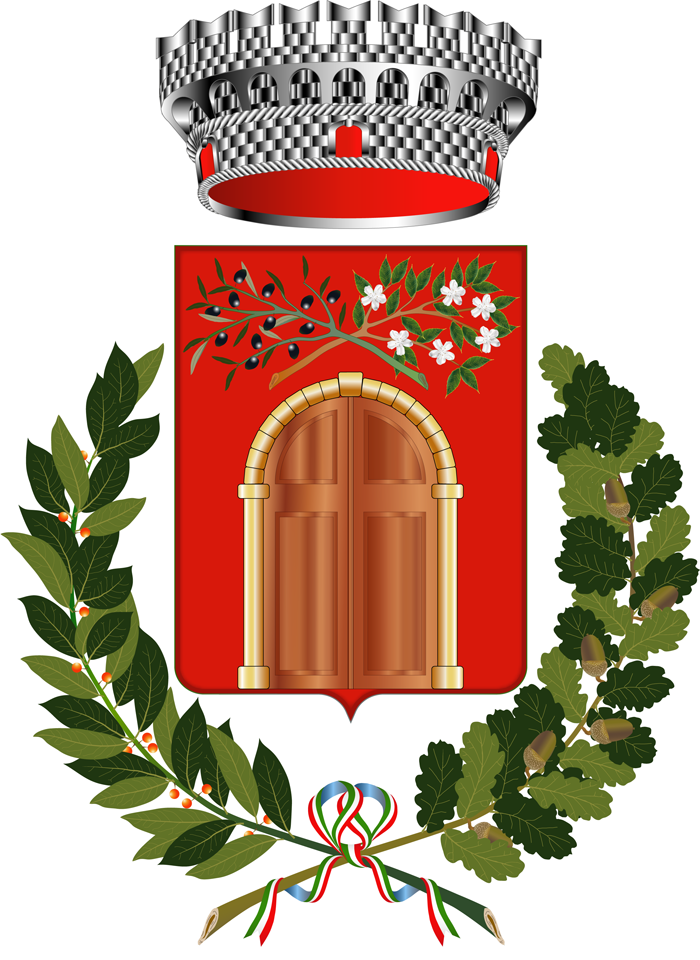
- Coat of arms

- Location within Sardinia
- Coordinates: 39°43′N 8°53′E
- Country: Italy
- Region: Sardinia
- Province: Oristano

Government
  - Mayor: Piergiorgio Corona

Area
  - Total: 12.51 km^{2} (4.83 sq mi)
- Elevation: 165 m (541 ft)

Population (2026)
  - Total: 528
  - Density: 42.2/km^{2} (109/sq mi)
- Demonyms: Baressesi; Baressesus
- Time zone: UTC+1 (CET)
  - Summer (DST): UTC+2 (CEST)
- Postal code: 09090
- Dialing code: 0783

Baressa (Sardinian: Arèssa) is a village and comune (municipality) in the Province of Oristano in the autonomous island region of Sardinia in Italy, located about 60 kilometres (37 mi) northwest of Cagliari and about 35 kilometres (22 mi) southeast of Oristano. It has 528 inhabitants.

Baressa borders the municipalities of Baradili, Gonnoscodina, Gonnosnò, Siddi, Simala, Turri, and Ussaramanna.

== Demographics ==
As of 2026, the population is 528, of which 49.8% are male, and 50.2% are female. Minors make up 8.7% of the population, and seniors make up 42.2%.

Historical population

| Year | Pop. | ±% |
|---|---|---|
| 1861 | 662 | — |
| 1871 | 710 | +7.3% |
| 1881 | 747 | +5.2% |
| 1901 | 768 | +2.8% |
| 1911 | 808 | +5.2% |
| 1921 | 792 | −2.0% |
| 1931 | 963 | +21.6% |
| 1936 | 1,033 | +7.3% |

| Year | Pop. | ±% |
|---|---|---|
| 1951 | 1,157 | +12.0% |
| 1961 | 1,209 | +4.5% |
| 1971 | 1,023 | −15.4% |
| 1981 | 1,001 | −2.2% |
| 1991 | 962 | −3.9% |
| 2001 | 849 | −11.7% |
| 2011 | 723 | −14.8% |
| 2021 | 568 | −21.4% |

Source: ISTAT

=== Immigration ===
As of 2025, of the known countries of birth of 534 residents, the most numerous are: Italy (525 – 98.3%), Germany (6 – 1.1%).
