= List of municipalities of the Province of Nuoro =

This is a list of the 53 municipalities (comuni) of the Province of Nuoro in the autonomous region of Sardinia in Italy.

== List ==
| Municipality | Native name | Population (2026) | Area (km^{2}) | Density |
|---|---|---|---|---|
| Aritzo | Arìtzo | 1,272 | 75.58 | 16.8 |
| Atzara | Atzàra | 974 | 35.92 | 27.1 |
| Austis | Aùstis | 711 | 50.81 | 14.0 |
| Belvì | Brebì | 529 | 18.10 | 29.2 |
| Birori | Bìroro | 481 | 17.33 | 27.8 |
| Bitti | Bìtzi | 2,476 | 215.37 | 11.5 |
| Bolotana | Olòthene/Bolòtzana | 2,244 | 108.44 | 20.7 |
| Borore | Bòrere | 1,902 | 42.68 | 44.6 |
| Bortigali | Bortigàle | 1,218 | 67.33 | 18.1 |
| Desulo | Dèsulu | 1,995 | 74.50 | 26.8 |
| Dorgali | Durgàli | 8,238 | 226.54 | 36.4 |
| Dualchi | Duàrche | 559 | 23.41 | 23.9 |
| Fonni | Onne | 3,552 | 112.27 | 31.6 |
| Gadoni | Adòni | 638 | 43.44 | 14.7 |
| Galtellì | Gartèddi | 2,377 | 56.53 | 42.0 |
| Gavoi | Gavòi | 2,404 | 38.06 | 63.2 |
| Irgoli | Irgòli | 2,194 | 75.30 | 29.1 |
| Lei | Lèi | 433 | 19.11 | 22.7 |
| Loculi | Lòcula | 476 | 38.15 | 12.5 |
| Lodè | Lodè | 1,455 | 123.45 | 11.8 |
| Lodine | Lodìne | 292 | 7.70 | 37.9 |
| Lula | Lùvula | 1,198 | 148.72 | 8.1 |
| Macomer | Macumère | 8,948 | 122.77 | 72.9 |
| Mamoiada | Mamujàda | 2,349 | 48.83 | 48.1 |
| Meana Sardo | Meàna | 1,518 | 73.80 | 20.6 |
| Noragugume | Noragùgume | 269 | 26.73 | 10.1 |
| Nuoro | Nùgoro | 32,718 | 192.06 | 170.4 |
| Oliena | Ulìana | 6,405 | 165.74 | 38.6 |
| Ollolai | Ollolài | 1,129 | 27.24 | 41.4 |
| Olzai | Ortzài/Orthài | 752 | 69.82 | 10.8 |
| Onanì | Onanìe | 337 | 71.97 | 4.7 |
| Onifai | Oniài | 728 | 43.19 | 16.9 |
| Oniferi | Onièri | 823 | 35.67 | 23.1 |
| Orani | Oràne | 2,576 | 130.43 | 19.8 |
| Orgosolo | Orgòsolo | 3,803 | 222.60 | 17.1 |
| Orosei | Orosèi | 6,838 | 91.00 | 75.1 |
| Orotelli | Orotèddi | 1,824 | 61.18 | 29.8 |
| Ortueri | Ortuèri | 961 | 38.83 | 24.7 |
| Orune | Urùne/Orùne | 2,022 | 128.45 | 15.7 |
| Osidda | Osìdde | 209 | 25.68 | 8.1 |
| Ottana | Otzàna | 2,147 | 45.07 | 47.6 |
| Ovodda | Ovòdda | 1,429 | 40.85 | 35.0 |
| Posada | Pasàda | 3,079 | 32.77 | 94.0 |
| Sarule | Sarùle | 1,450 | 52.72 | 27.5 |
| Seulo | Seùlu | 745 | 58.79 | 12.7 |
| Silanus | Silànos | 1,891 | 47.94 | 39.4 |
| Sindia | Sindìa | 1,558 | 58.57 | 26.6 |
| Siniscola | Thiniscòle | 11,139 | 196.38 | 56.7 |
| Sorgono | Sòrgono | 1,434 | 56.05 | 25.6 |
| Teti | Tèti | 561 | 43.80 | 12.8 |
| Tiana | Tìana | 418 | 19.32 | 21.6 |
| Tonara | Tonàra | 1,806 | 52.02 | 34.7 |
| Torpè | Torpè | 2,757 | 91.50 | 30.1 |

== See also ==
- List of municipalities of Sardinia
- List of municipalities of Italy
