= Macomer =

Macomer Macumere (Sardinian)
- Comune
- Comune di Macomer
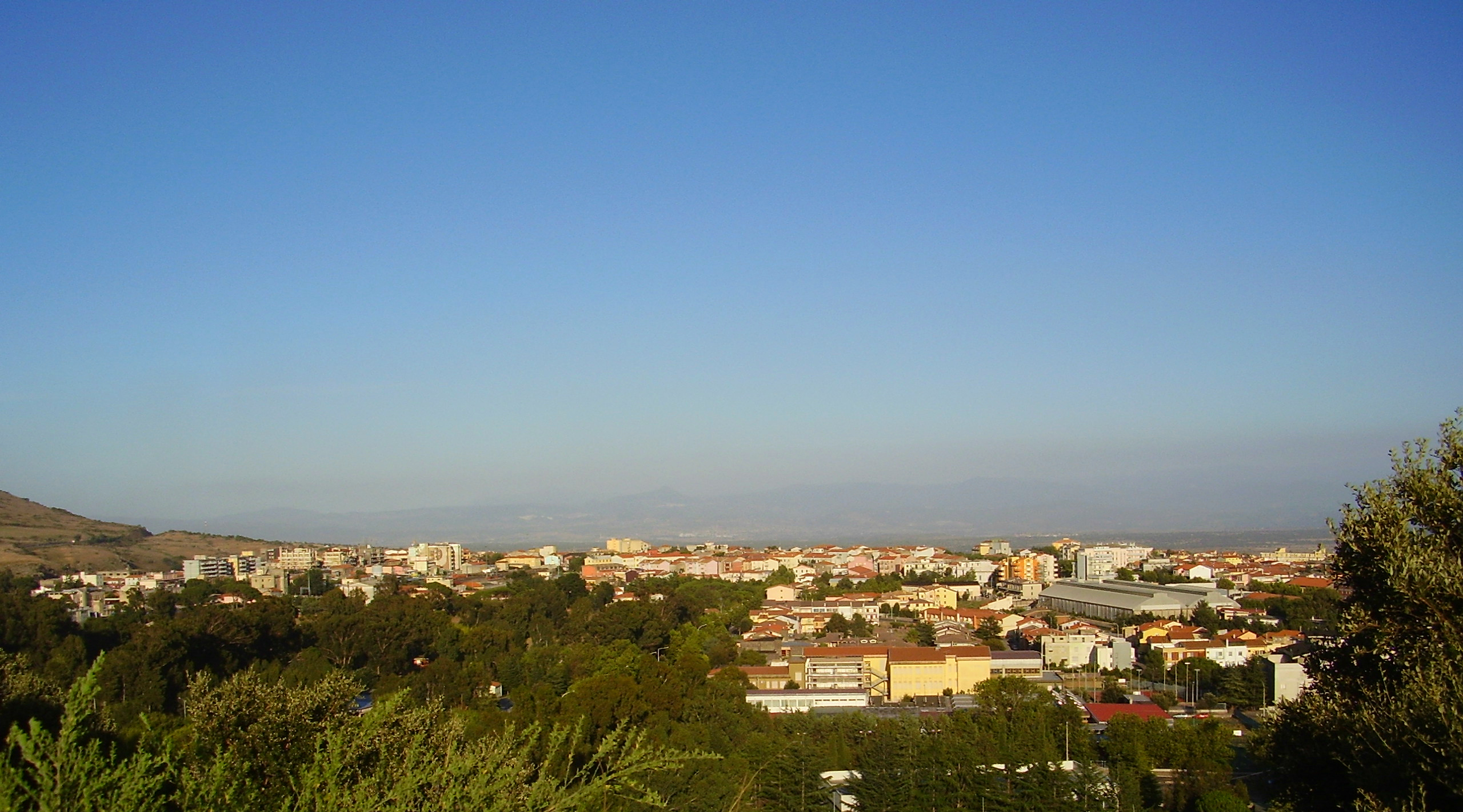
- View of Macomer

- Coat of arms

- Location within Sardinia
- Coordinates: 40°16′N 08°47′E
- Country: Italy
- Region: Sardinia
- Province: Nuoro (NU)

Government
  - Mayor: Riccardo Uda (since May 2023)

Area
  - Total: 122.77 km^{2} (47.40 sq mi)
- Elevation: 550 m (1,800 ft)

Population (2026)
  - Total: 8,948
  - Density: 72.88/km^{2} (188.8/sq mi)
- Demonym: Macomeresi
- Time zone: UTC+1 (CET)
  - Summer (DST): UTC+2 (CEST)
- Postal code: 08015
- Dialing code: 0785
- Patron saint: St. Pantaleone
- Saint day: July 27th

Macomer (Sardinian: Macumere) is a town and comune (municipality) in the province of Nuoro in the autonomous island region of Sardinia in Italy. It is situated on the southern ascent to the Campeda plateau, at the junction of narrow-gauge lines branching from the main railroad line running east to Nuoro and west to Bosa. It has 8,948 inhabitants.

The district, especially the Campeda, is well suited for grazing and horse and cattle breeding, which is carried on to a considerable extent.

== History ==
Macomer, known to the Greek geographer Ptolemy as "Macopsissa," has been inhabited since antiquity. In 1478 was the scene of the historical battle between the Sardinians and the Aragonese, which ended the independence of Sardinia. In 1767, under the Kingdom of Sardinia, it became the capital of the Marquisate of Marghine. The Marquisate included the nearby villages of Birori, Bolotana, Borore, Bortigali, Dualchi, Lei, Mulargia, Noragugume and Silanus.

In 1949, a statue called The Venus of Macomer was discovered in a cave located in "Marras" area, in a gorge of the river S'Adde. The artifact depicts a Goddess Mother dating back to the Palaeolithic period. It is about 14 centimetres (5.5 in) high and was built with local basalt. It is currently kept in the National Archaeological Museum of Cagliari.

Nowadays, Macomer is a destination for tourists who want to see the landscape around the city.

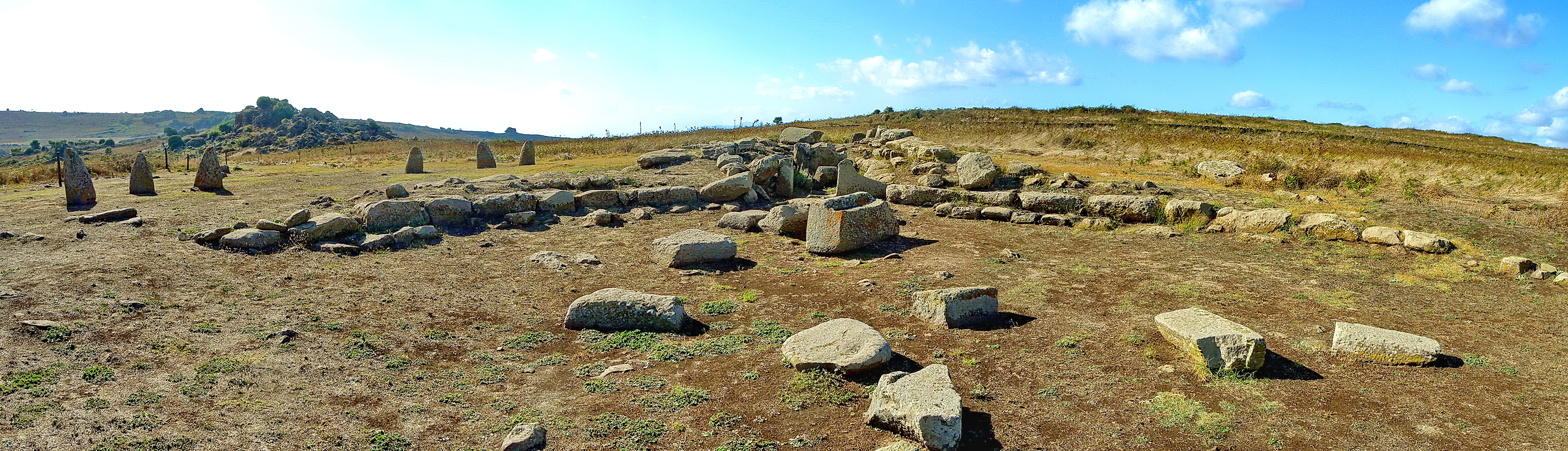
The archaeological site of Tamuli is one of the attractions of Macomer.

== Climate ==
Climate data for Macomer (1981–2010)
Month	Jan	Feb	Mar	Apr	May	Jun	Jul	Aug	Sep	Oct	Nov	Dec	Year
Mean daily maximum °C (°F)	9.7 (49.5)	10.5 (50.9)	13.4 (56.1)	16.3 (61.3)	21.5 (70.7)	26.4 (79.5)	30.4 (86.7)	30.0 (86.0)	24.9 (76.8)	20.3 (68.5)	14.2 (57.6)	10.6 (51.1)	19.0 (66.2)
Daily mean °C (°F)	6.7 (44.1)	7.0 (44.6)	9.3 (48.7)	11.7 (53.1)	16.2 (61.2)	20.4 (68.7)	23.9 (75.0)	24.0 (75.2)	19.7 (67.5)	16.1 (61.0)	10.9 (51.6)	7.7 (45.9)	14.5 (58.0)
Mean daily minimum °C (°F)	3.6 (38.5)	3.5 (38.3)	5.1 (41.2)	7.0 (44.6)	10.9 (51.6)	14.3 (57.7)	17.4 (63.3)	17.9 (64.2)	14.5 (58.1)	11.8 (53.2)	7.6 (45.7)	4.7 (40.5)	9.9 (49.7)
Average precipitation mm (inches)	80.6 (3.17)	69.5 (2.74)	62.9 (2.48)	83.1 (3.27)	56.5 (2.22)	27.1 (1.07)	6.7 (0.26)	15.7 (0.62)	47.1 (1.85)	75.2 (2.96)	117.1 (4.61)	110.4 (4.35)	751.9 (29.6)
Source: Sistema nazionale protezione ambiente

== Demographics ==
As of 2026, the population is 8,948, of which 49.3% are male, and 50.7% are female. Minors make up 10.5% of the population, and seniors make up 30.7%.

Historical population

Year	Pop.	±%
1861	2,366	—
1871	2,427	+2.6%
1881	2,671	+10.1%
1901	3,488	+30.6%
1911	3,983	+14.2%
1921	4,177	+4.9%
1931	4,743	+13.6%
1936	5,125	+8.1%

Year	Pop.	±%
1951	6,674	+30.2%
1961	8,125	+21.7%
1971	9,531	+17.3%
1981	11,083	+16.3%
1991	11,424	+3.1%
2001	11,116	−2.7%
2011	10,511	−5.4%
2021	9,444	−10.2%

Source: ISTAT

=== Immigration ===
As of 2025, immigrants make up 4.5% of the population. The 5 largest foreign countries of birth are Morocco, Romania, Germany, Switzerland, and Pakistan.

== Main sights ==
The region is richer in the bronze-age towers known as nuraghi than any other part of Sardinia.

The old parish church of San Pantaleone has three Roman milestones in front of it, belonging to the Roman high-road from Carales to Turris Libisonis. A modern road now follows the ancient one. Recently an ethnographic museum called "Le Arti Antiche" (The ancient Arts) has been opened, where it is possible to see tools traditionally used for agriculture and livestock, folk costumes, and photographs. The Monte di Sant'Antonio (St. Anthony's Mountain) has a great historical and naturalistic importance; on 13 June of every year the anniversary of the Saint of Padua is celebrated there.
