= Altopiano di Campeda =

Coordinates: 40°18′N 8°47′E

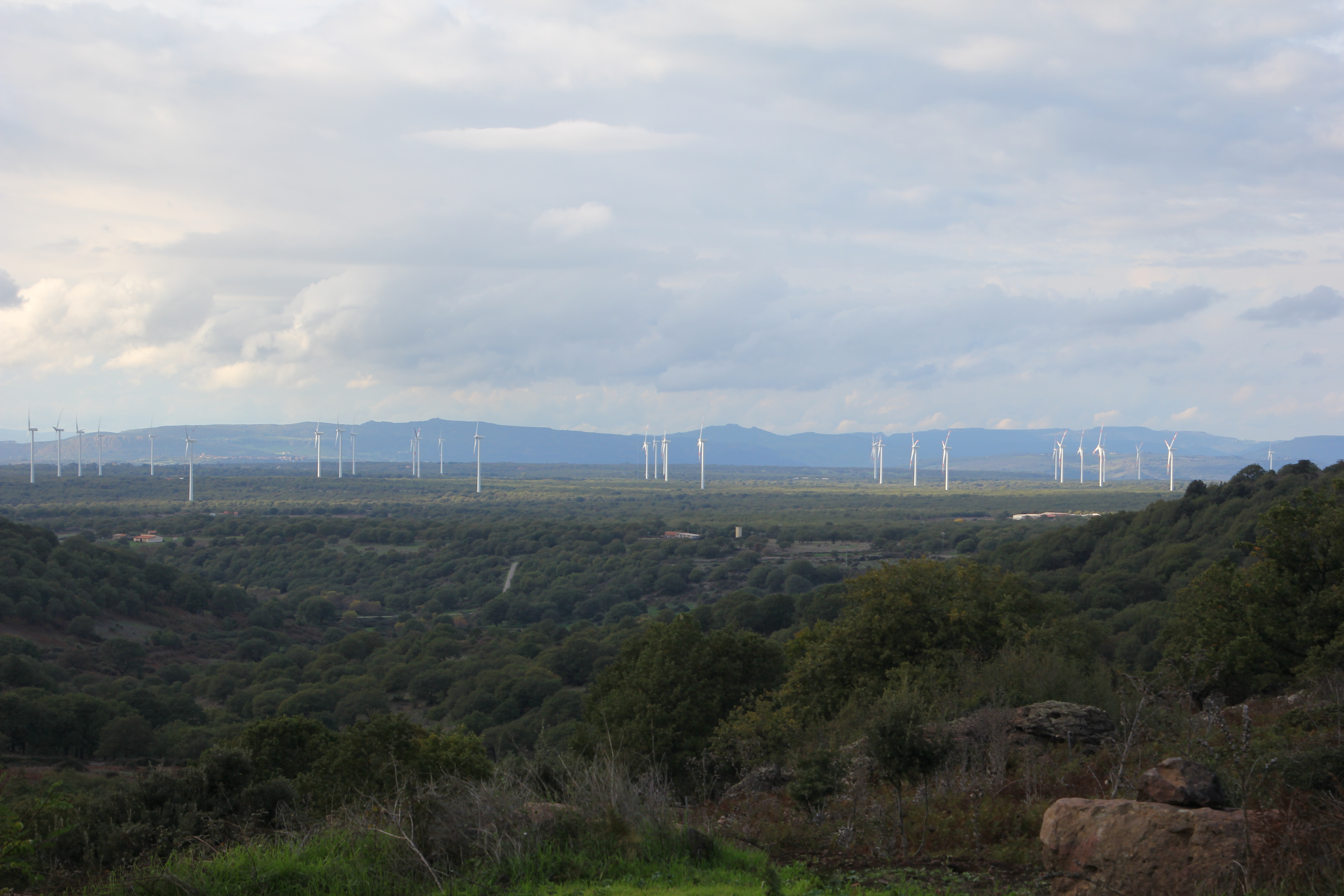
The wind farm in Campeda

The Altopiano di Campeda (Campeda Plateau) is a plateau that extends in north-western Sardinia over an area of 11,058 hectares. The territory, divided between the municipalities of Macomer, Bortigali, Sindia, Bonorva, Semestene and Pozzomaggiore, is located at an altitude between 425 and 845 meters. It is crossed by the river of the same name, which flows into the Temo river, in the locality of Pòddighe.
