= Roberto Deriu =

Italian politician (born 1969)

Member of the Regional Council of Sardinia
- Incumbent
- Assumed office 20 March 2014

President of the Province of Nuoro
- In office 10 May 2005 – 20 March 2014
- Preceded by: Francesco Maria Licheri
- Succeeded by: Extraordinary administration

Personal details
- Born: 1 June 1969 (age 57) Nuoro, Sardinia, Italy
- Party: Democratic Party
- Occupation: Journalist

Roberto Deriu (born 1 June 1969) is an Italian politician and journalist of the Democratic Party, serving as a member of the Regional Council of Sardinia since 2014. He previously served as president of the Province of Nuoro from 2005 to 2014.

== Career ==
Deriu began his political career in the Christian Democracy and later joined the Italian People's Party and The Daisy. From 2000 to 2005 he served as assessor for culture, tourism, sport and entertainment in the municipality of Nuoro.

In 2005, Deriu was elected president of the Province of Nuoro as the candidate of a centre-left coalition, receiving 60.6% of the vote. He was re-elected in 2010 for the Democratic Party, defeating centre-right candidate Luigi Crisponi in the runoff with 51.29%.

In February 2014, Deriu was elected to the Regional Council of Sardinia. He subsequently left the presidency of the province because of incompatibility between the two offices, with vice president Costantino Tidu assuming the functions. He was re-elected regional councillor in 2019 and 2024.
