= Necropolis of Sas Concas =

Prehistoric site in Sardinia

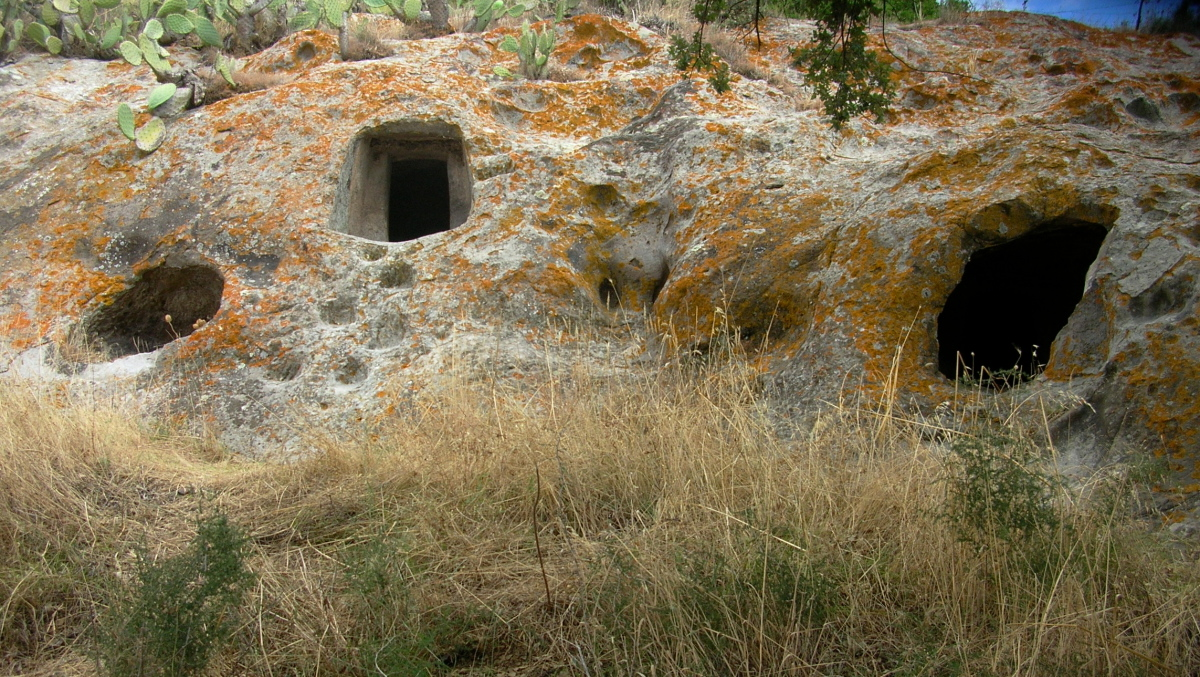
- Interactive map of Necropolis of Sas Concas
- Type: Burial
- Periods: Chalcolithic
- Cultures: Pre-Nuragic Sardinia
- Location: Oniferi, Sardinia, Italy

The necropolis of Sas Concas is a prehistoric archaeological site located in the municipality of Oniferi, in the province of Nuoro, Sardinia.

The complex is composed of twenty domus de janas dug into the trachyte and dated to the third millennium BC (Abealzu-Filigosa culture). One of its main features are the petroglyphs depicting the "upside down", a stylized human figure upside down, engraved in two domus de janas.

The site has been the subject of excavations in the 1960s and the 1970s.
