= Giuseppe Ciccolini =

Italian politician (born 1980)

President of the Province of Nuoro
- Incumbent
- Assumed office 30 September 2025
- Preceded by: Extraordinary administration

Mayor of Bitti
- Incumbent
- Assumed office 29 May 2007
- Preceded by: Marino Satta

Personal details
- Born: 22 January 1980 (age 46) Ozieri, Sardinia, Italy
- Party: Democratic Party

Giuseppe Ciccolini (born 22 January 1980) is an Italian politician of the Democratic Party. He has served as president of the Province of Nuoro since September 2025 and as mayor of Bitti since 2007.

Ciccolini was first elected mayor of Bitti in the 2007 local elections and was subsequently re-elected in 2012, 2017 and 2022. In March 2021, he became provincial secretary of the Democratic Party in Nuoro, resigning in 2024 after his appointment as extraordinary commissioner of the province. One year later, he was elected president of the Province of Nuoro, receiving 68.07% of the weighted vote against Riccardo Uda, mayor of Macomer. His election marked the return of an elected provincial president in Nuoro after more than ten years of administration by extraordinary commissioners.
