= List of presidents of the Province of Nuoro =

President of the Province of Nuoro
- Presidente della Provincia di Nuoro
- Incumbent; Giuseppe Ciccolini since 30 September 2025
- Term length: 4 years
- Formation: 1927

The president of the Province of Nuoro is the head of the provincial government in Nuoro, Sardinia, Italy. The president oversees the administration of the province, coordinates the activities of the municipalities, and represents the province in regional and national matters.

Since September 2025, the office has been held by Giuseppe Ciccolini of the Democratic Party.

== List ==
=== Presidents of the Provincial Deputation (1944–1951) ===
No.	Portrait	Name	Term of office		Party
No.	Portrait	Name	Start	End	Party
		Sebastiano Puligheddu	?	?	?

=== Presidents of the Province (1951–present) ===
No.	Portrait	Name	Term of office		Party
No.	Portrait	Name	Start	End	Party
		Pietrino Monni	?	?	Christian Democracy
		Giosuè Ligios	1964	1969	Christian Democracy
		Salvatore Murgia	1969	1973	Christian Democracy
		Gianfranco Putzu	1973	June 1975	?
		Giovanni Nonne	June 1975	December 1975	Italian Socialist Party
		Giannetto Visentini	December 1975	1977	?
		Mario Cheri	1977	1983	Italian Communist Party
		Tonino Orrù	1983	1985	?
		Giannino Deplano	1985	1986	Christian Democracy
		Antonio Colli	1986	1987	Sardinian Action Party
		Salvatore Angelo Piras	28 July 1987	1 August 1990	Italian Socialist Party
		Francesco Achille Crisponi	1 August 1990	24 March 1993	Christian Democracy
		Federico Caredda	21 May 1993	3 May 1995	Christian Democracy
		Giuseppe Matteo Pirisi	3 May 1995	14 June 1999	Democratic Party of the Left
–		Tonino Rocca (Acting president)	14 June 1999	1 May 2000	Independent (centre-left)
		Francesco Maria Licheri	1 May 2000	10 May 2005	Italian People's Party; The Daisy
		Roberto Deriu	10 May 2005	23 June 2010	The Daisy; Democratic Party
		Roberto Deriu	23 June 2010	20 March 2014	The Daisy; Democratic Party
–		Costantino Tidu (Acting president)	20 March 2014	17 June 2015	Democratic Party
–		Sabina Bullita	17 June 2015	20 April 2016	Regional commissioner
–		Alessandra Pistis	20 April 2016	7 October 2016	Regional commissioner
–		Maria Cristina Madeddu	7 October 2016	23 December 2016	Regional commissioner
–		Costantino Tidu	23 December 2016	19 September 2024	Regional commissioner
–		Giuseppe Ciccolini	19 September 2024	30 September 2025	Regional commissioner
		Giuseppe Ciccolini	30 September 2025	Incumbent	Democratic Party

== Sources ==
- "Storia amministrativa dell'ente". Ministero dell'Interno.
