= Bolotana =

Bolotana Golòthene (Sardinian)
- Comune
- Comune di Bolotana
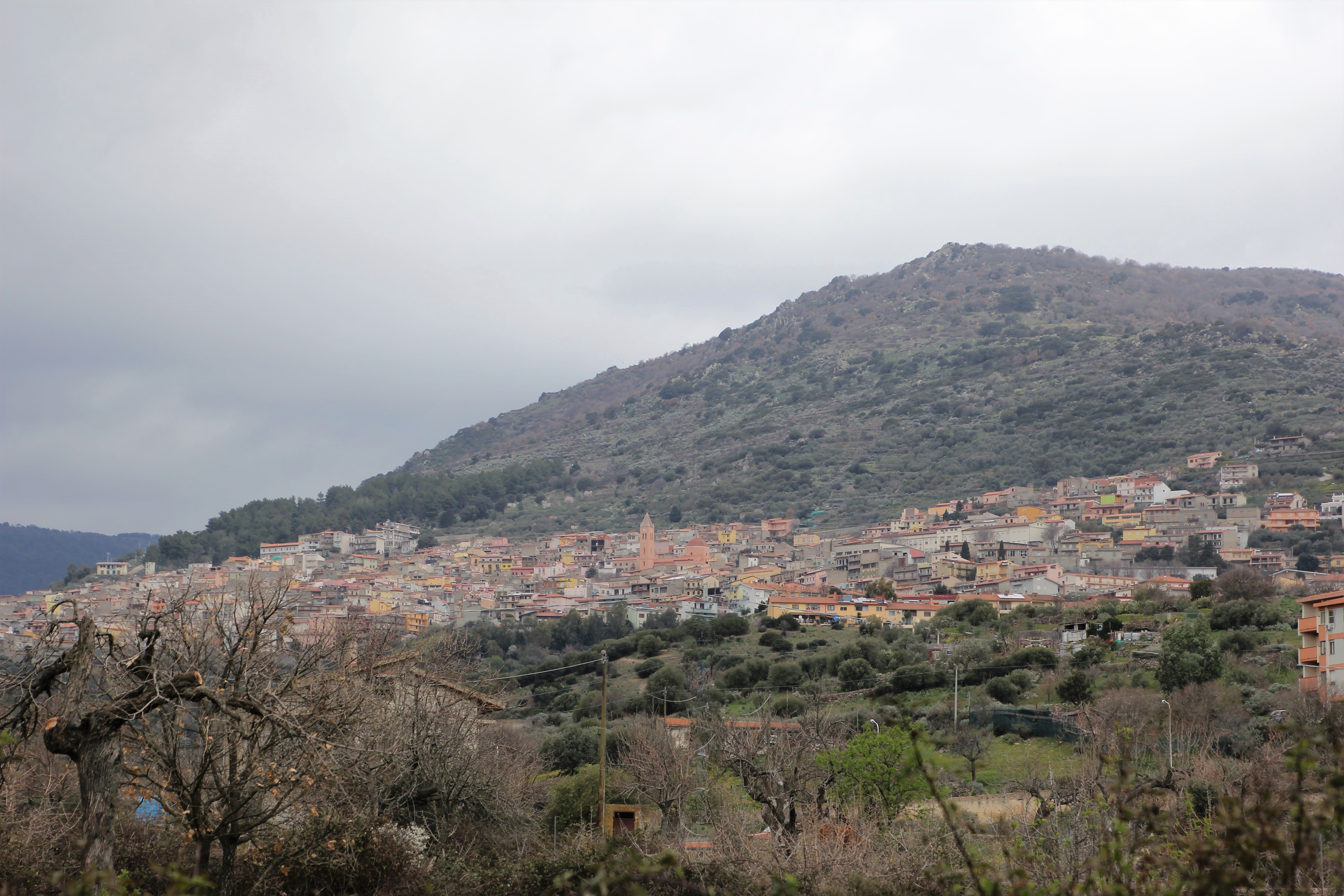
- View of Bolotana

- Location within Sardinia
- Coordinates: 40°19′42″N 8°57′33″E
- Country: Italy
- Region: Sardinia
- Province: Nuoro (NU)

Government
  - Mayor: Annalisa Motzo

Area
  - Total: 108.44 km^{2} (41.87 sq mi)
- Elevation: 472 m (1,549 ft)

Population (2026)
  - Total: 2,244
  - Density: 20.69/km^{2} (53.60/sq mi)
- Demonym: Bolotanesi
- Time zone: UTC+1 (CET)
  - Summer (DST): UTC+2 (CEST)
- Postal code: 08011
- Dialing code: 0785
- Website: Official website

Bolotana (Sardinian: Golòthene) is a town and comune (municipality) in the Province of Nuoro in the autonomous island region of Sardinia in Italy, located about 120 kilometres (75 mi) north of Cagliari and about 30 kilometres (19 mi) west of Nuoro. It has 2,244 inhabitants.

Bolotana borders the municipalities of Bonorva, Bortigali, Illorai, Lei, Macomer, Noragugume, Orani, Ottana, and Silanus.

== Climate ==
Climate data for Rifornitore Tirso 182 m elevation (1981-2010)
Month	Jan	Feb	Mar	Apr	May	Jun	Jul	Aug	Sep	Oct	Nov	Dec	Year
Mean daily maximum °C (°F)	12.7 (54.9)	13.9 (57.0)	17.1 (62.8)	19.9 (67.8)	25.7 (78.3)	30.9 (87.6)	35.4 (95.7)	35.5 (95.9)	29.7 (85.5)	24.6 (76.3)	17.6 (63.7)	13.5 (56.3)	23.0 (73.4)
Mean daily minimum °C (°F)	2.3 (36.1)	2.8 (37.0)	4.7 (40.5)	6.9 (44.4)	11.0 (51.8)	14.4 (57.9)	17.6 (63.7)	18.0 (64.4)	14.8 (58.6)	12.1 (53.8)	7.2 (45.0)	4.2 (39.6)	9.6 (49.3)
Source: Climatologia della Sardegna per il trentennio 1981-2010

== Demographics ==
As of 2026, the population is 2,244, of which 46.4% are male, and 53.6% are female. Minors make up 9.4% of the population, and seniors make up 34.9%.

Historical population

Year	Pop.	±%
1861	2,858	—
1871	2,916	+2.0%
1881	3,097	+6.2%
1901	3,536	+14.2%
1911	3,754	+6.2%
1921	3,742	−0.3%
1931	4,087	+9.2%
1936	4,317	+5.6%

Year	Pop.	±%
1951	4,494	+4.1%
1961	4,274	−4.9%
1971	3,495	−18.2%
1981	3,858	+10.4%
1991	3,625	−6.0%
2001	3,276	−9.6%
2011	2,846	−13.1%
2021	2,419	−15.0%

Source: ISTAT

=== Immigration ===
As of 2025, immigrants make up 6.3% of the population. The 5 largest foreign countries of birth are Morocco, Germany, Belgium, France, and Switzerland.

=== "Blue zone" ===
In 2026, a study published in Frontiers in Aging by researchers from the University of Sassari and the University of Alabama at Birmingham identified Bolotana as a possible new longevity blue zone. The study found that 13.8% of women in the village who reach the age of 70 live to 100, compared with 3.5% in Italy overall, placing Bolotana second only to Hong Kong for female longevity. Of those born in Bolotana between 1900 and 1925, 38 lived beyond 100.

== Gallery ==
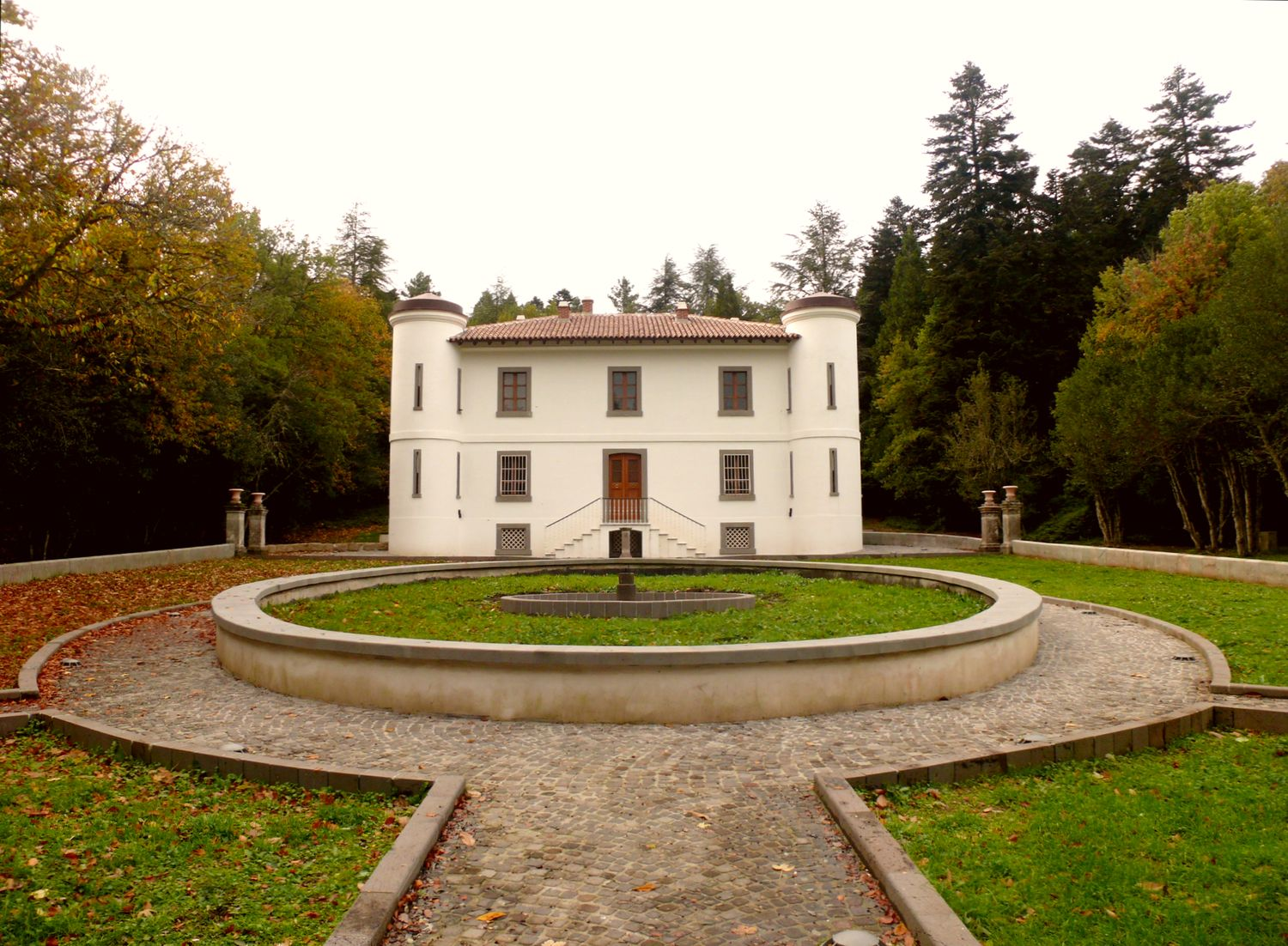
Villa Piercy in Badde Salighes's forest

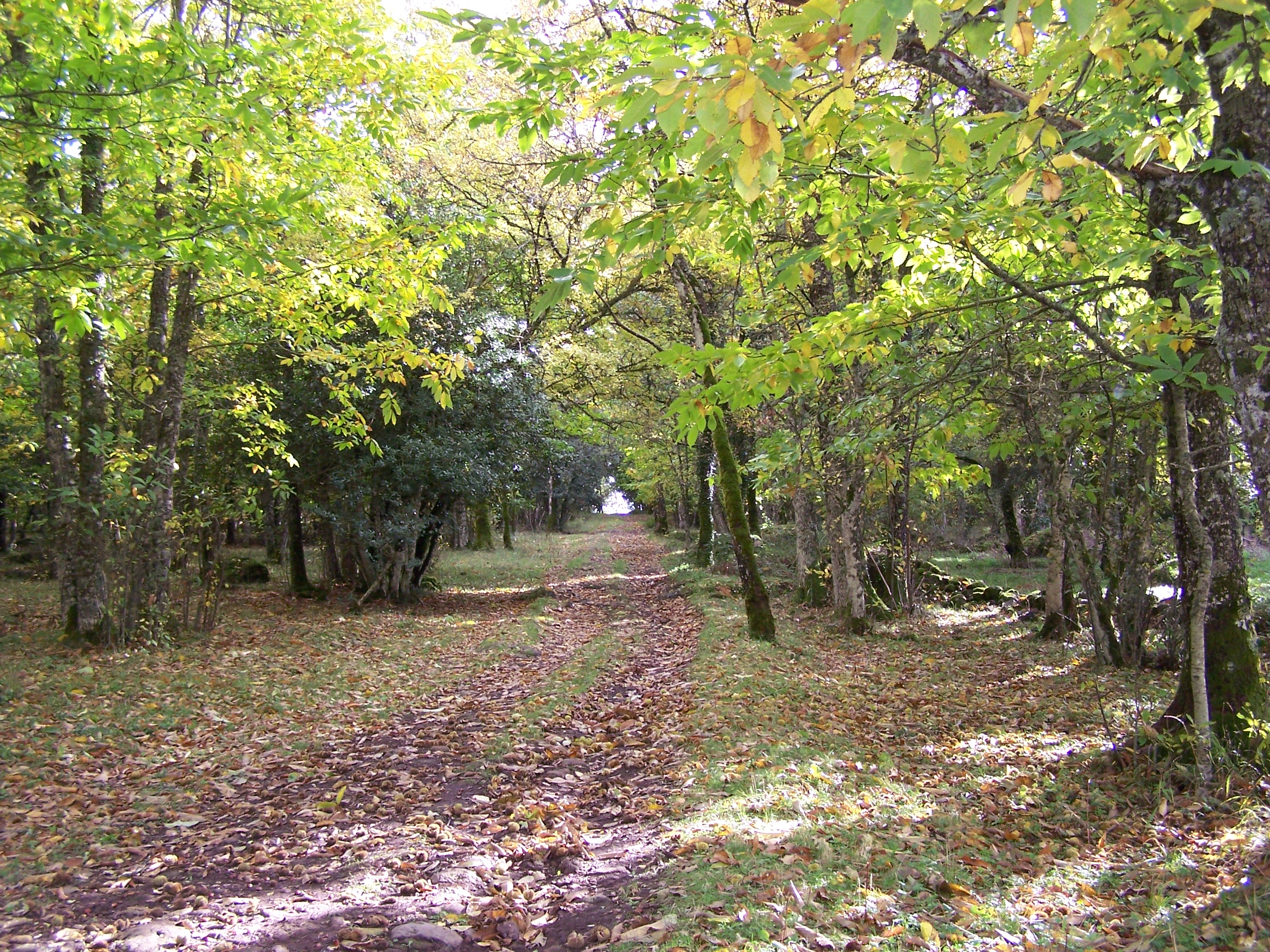
Badde Salighes grove

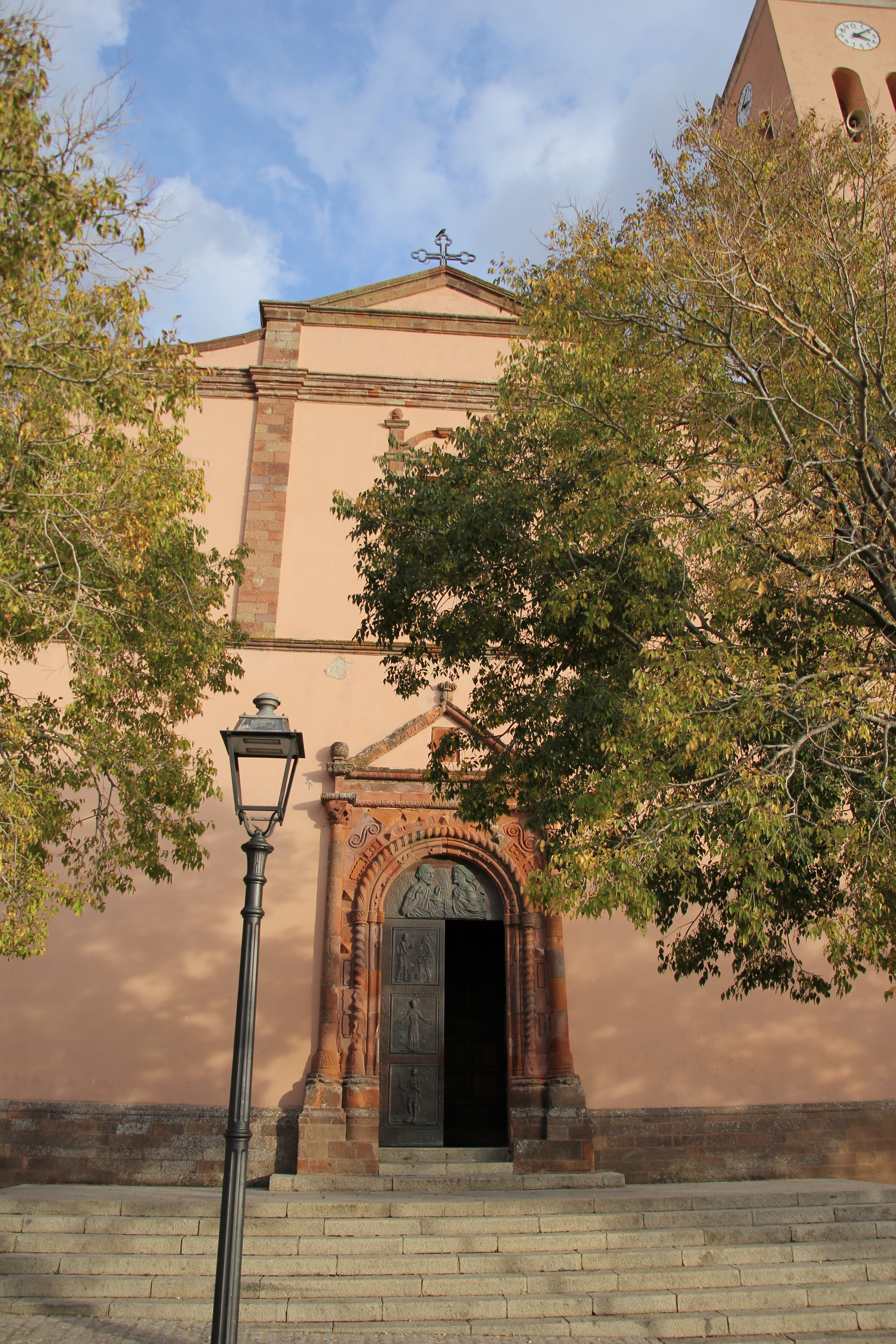
Church of San Pietro and Paolo

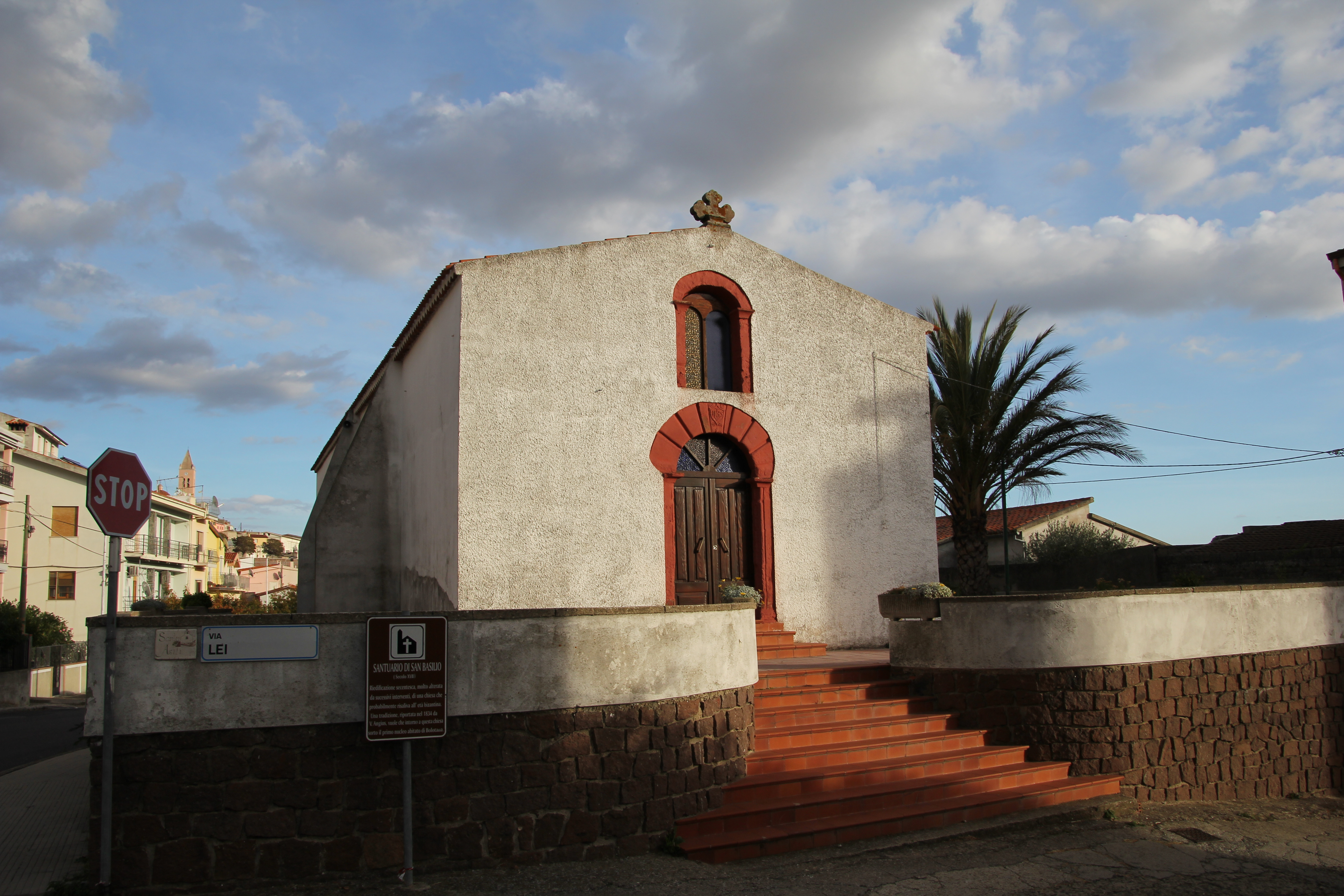
Church of San Basilio

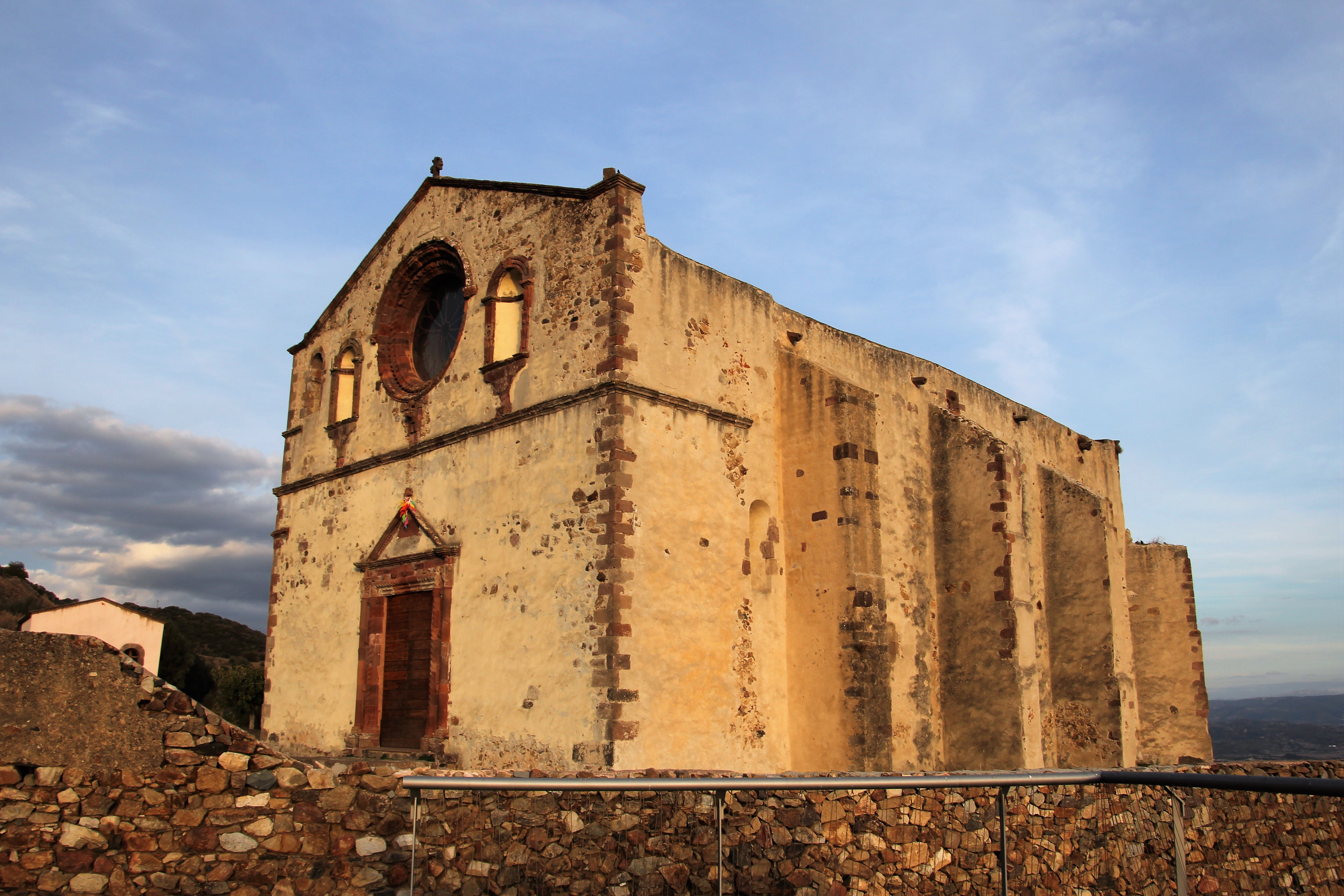
Church of San Bachisio
