= Lodine =

- Comune
- Comune di Lodine
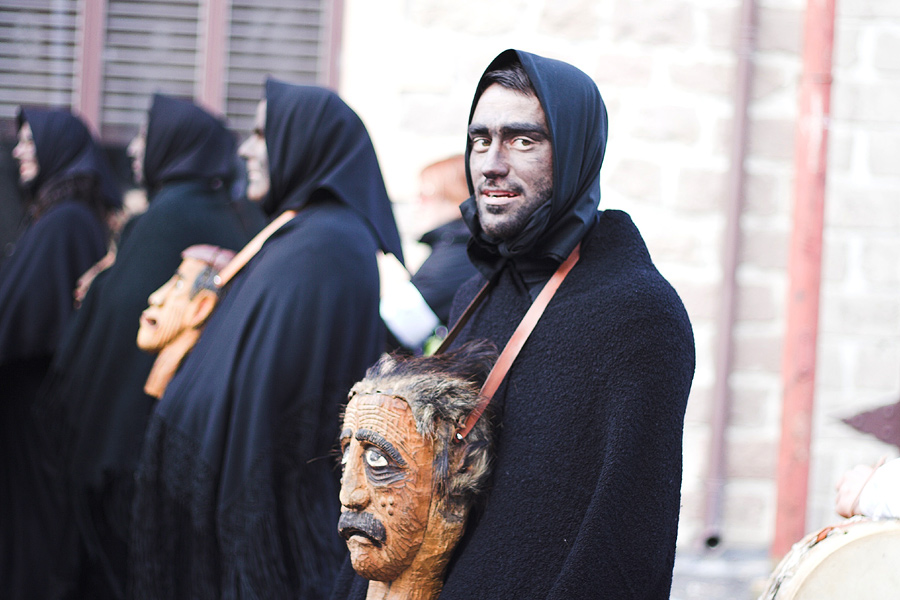
- Carrasecare carnival in Lodine

- Location within Sardinia
- Coordinates: 40°9′N 9°13′E
- Country: Italy
- Region: Sardinia
- Province: Nuoro (NU)
- Frazioni: Fonni, Gavoi

Area
  - Total: 7.70 km^{2} (2.97 sq mi)
- Elevation: 882 m (2,894 ft)

Population (2026)
  - Total: 292
  - Density: 37.9/km^{2} (98.2/sq mi)
- Demonym: Lodinesi
- Time zone: UTC+1 (CET)
  - Summer (DST): UTC+2 (CEST)
- Postal code: 08020
- Dialing code: 0784
- ISTAT code: 091104
- Patron saint: San Giorgio
- Saint day: 23 April

Lodine is a village and comune (municipality) in the province of Nuoro in the autonomous island region of Sardinia in Italy, located about 100 kilometres (62 mi) north of Cagliari and about 20 kilometres (12 mi) northeast of Nuoro. It has 292 inhabitants.

== Demographics ==
As of 2026, the population is 292, of which 49.7% are male, and 50.3% are female. Minors make up 10.3% of the population, and seniors make up 29.5%.

Historical population

Year	Pop.	±%
1861	116	—
1871	163	+40.5%
1881	153	−6.1%
1901	171	+11.8%
1911	205	+19.9%
1921	228	+11.2%
1931	237	+3.9%
1936	245	+3.4%

Year	Pop.	±%
1951	318	+29.8%
1961	415	+30.5%
1971	377	−9.2%
1981	379	+0.5%
1991	352	−7.1%
2001	408	+15.9%
2011	358	−12.3%
2021	307	−14.2%

Source: ISTAT

=== Immigration ===
As of 2025, immigrants make up 1.4% of the population. The foreign countries of birth are Germany, Switzerland, and Ukraine.
