= Birori =

Birori Bìroro (Sardinian)
- Comune
- Comune di Birori
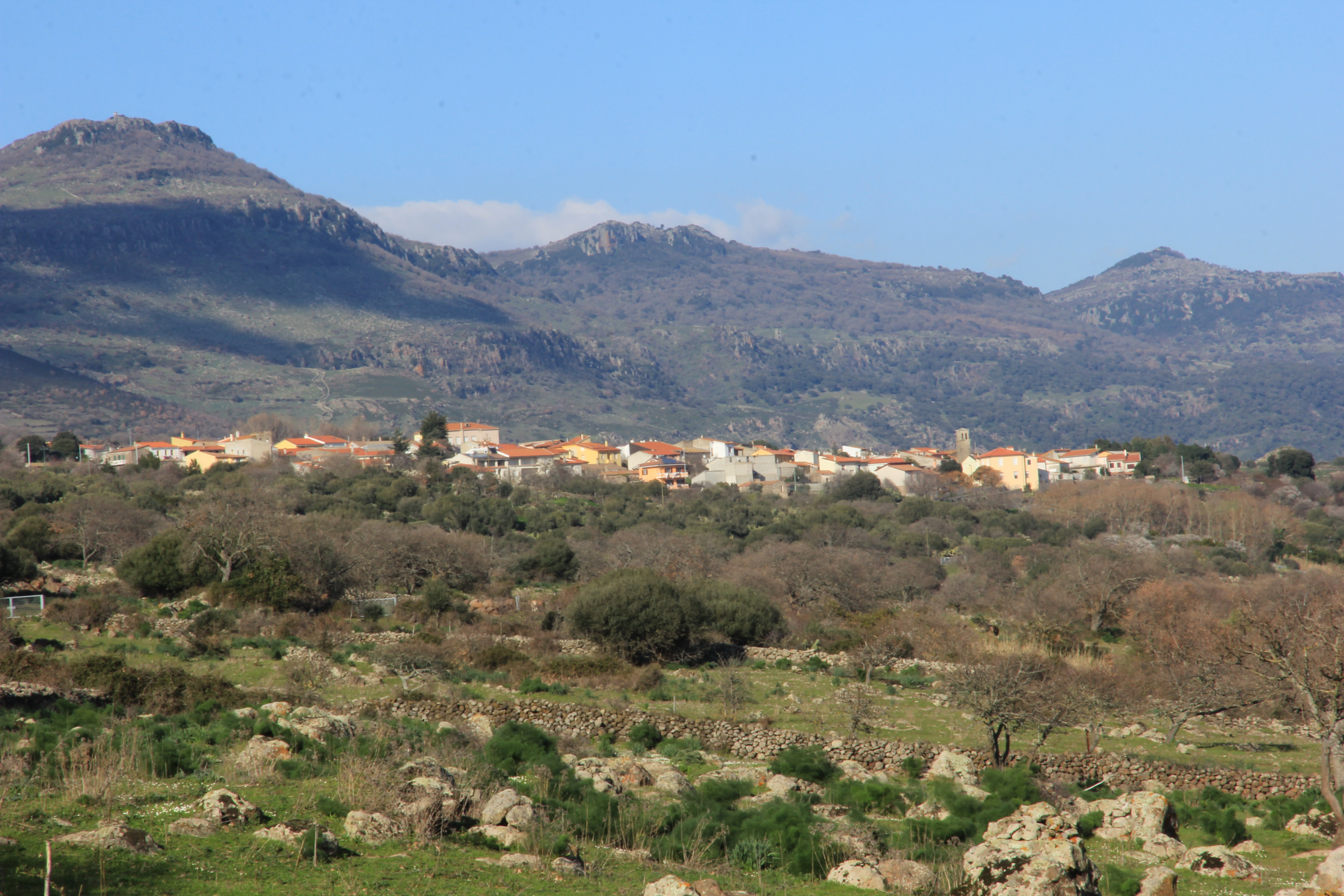
- View of Birori

- Location within Sardinia
- Coordinates: 40°15′16″N 8°48′55″E
- Country: Italy
- Region: Sardinia
- Province: Province of Nuoro (NU)

Area
  - Total: 17.33 km^{2} (6.69 sq mi)
- Elevation: 450 m (1,480 ft)

Population (2026)
  - Total: 481
  - Density: 27.8/km^{2} (71.9/sq mi)
- Time zone: UTC+1 (CET)
  - Summer (DST): UTC+2 (CEST)
- Postal code: 08010
- Dialing code: 0785
- Patron saint: S. Andrea
- Saint day: 30 Novembre

Birori (Sardinian: Bìroro) is a village and comune (municipality) in the Province of Nuoro in the autonomous island region of Sardinia in Italy, located about 142 kilometres (88 mi) north of Cagliari and about 50 kilometres (31 mi) west of Nuoro. It has 481 inhabitants.

Birori borders the municipalities of Borore, Bortigali, Dualchi, and Macomer.

== Demographics ==
As of 2026, the population is 481, of which 48.4% are male, and 51.6% are female. Minors make up 11.6% of the population, and seniors make up 31%.

Historical population

Year	Pop.	±%
1861	442	—
1871	398	−10.0%
1881	441	+10.8%
1901	419	−5.0%
1911	449	+7.2%
1921	450	+0.2%
1931	489	+8.7%
1936	463	−5.3%

Year	Pop.	±%
1951	498	+7.6%
1961	479	−3.8%
1971	401	−16.3%
1981	392	−2.2%
1991	557	+42.1%
2001	591	+6.1%
2011	561	−5.1%
2021	499	−11.1%

Source: ISTAT

=== Immigration ===
As of 2025, immigrants make up 8.9% of the population. The 5 largest foreign countries of birth are Morocco, Switzerland, Germany, Albania, and Belgium.

== Gallery ==
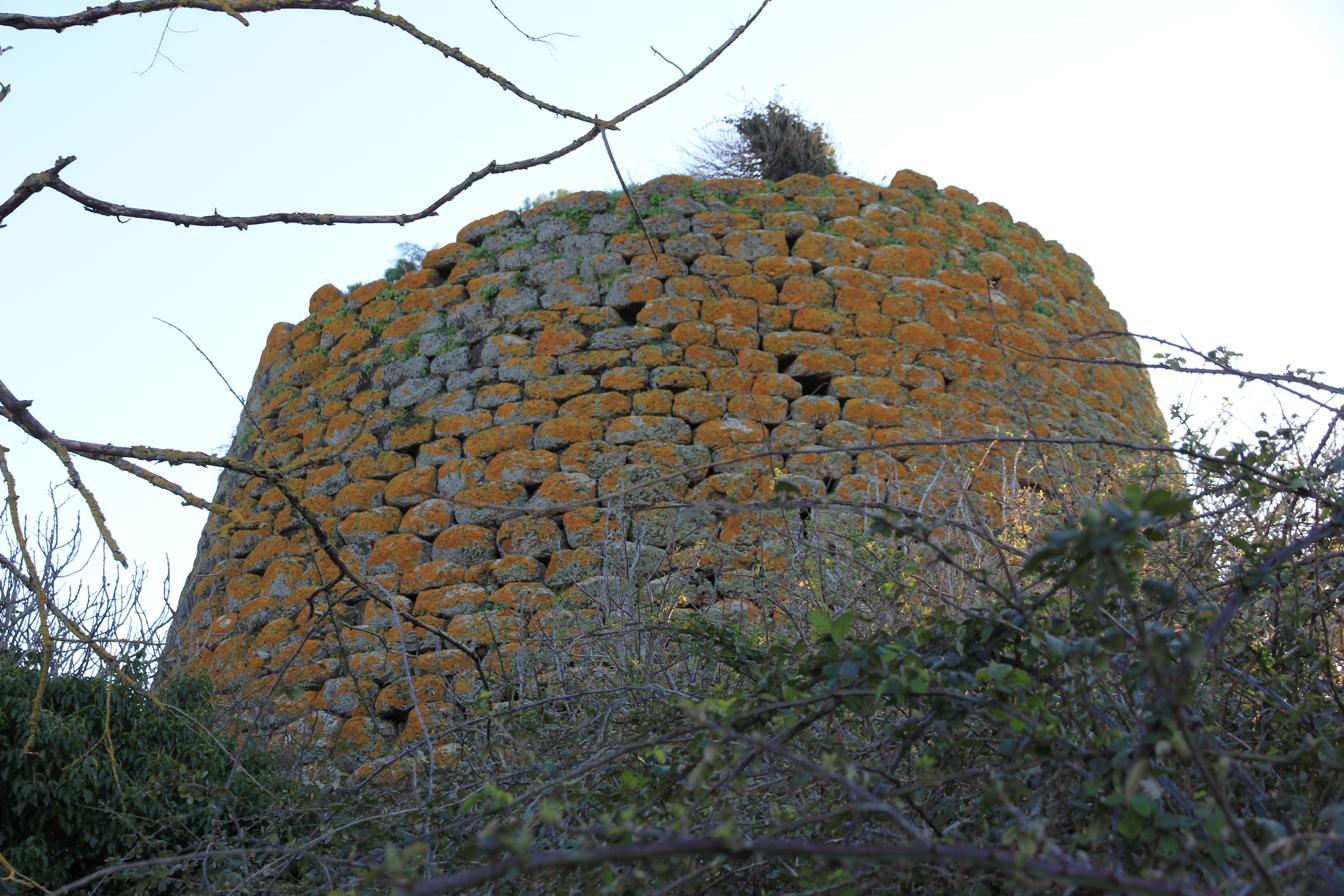
Sorolo nuraghe

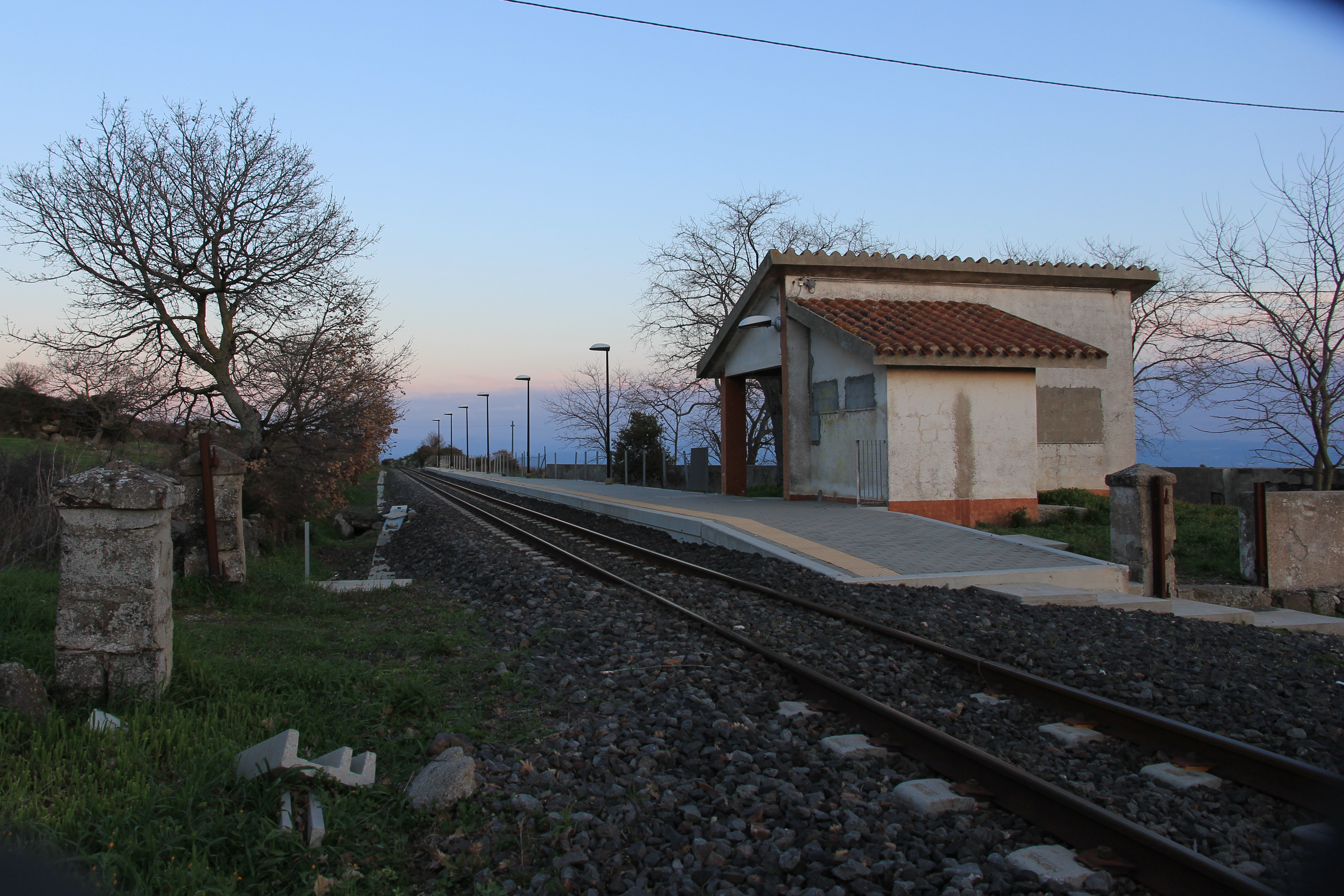
Train station in Birori

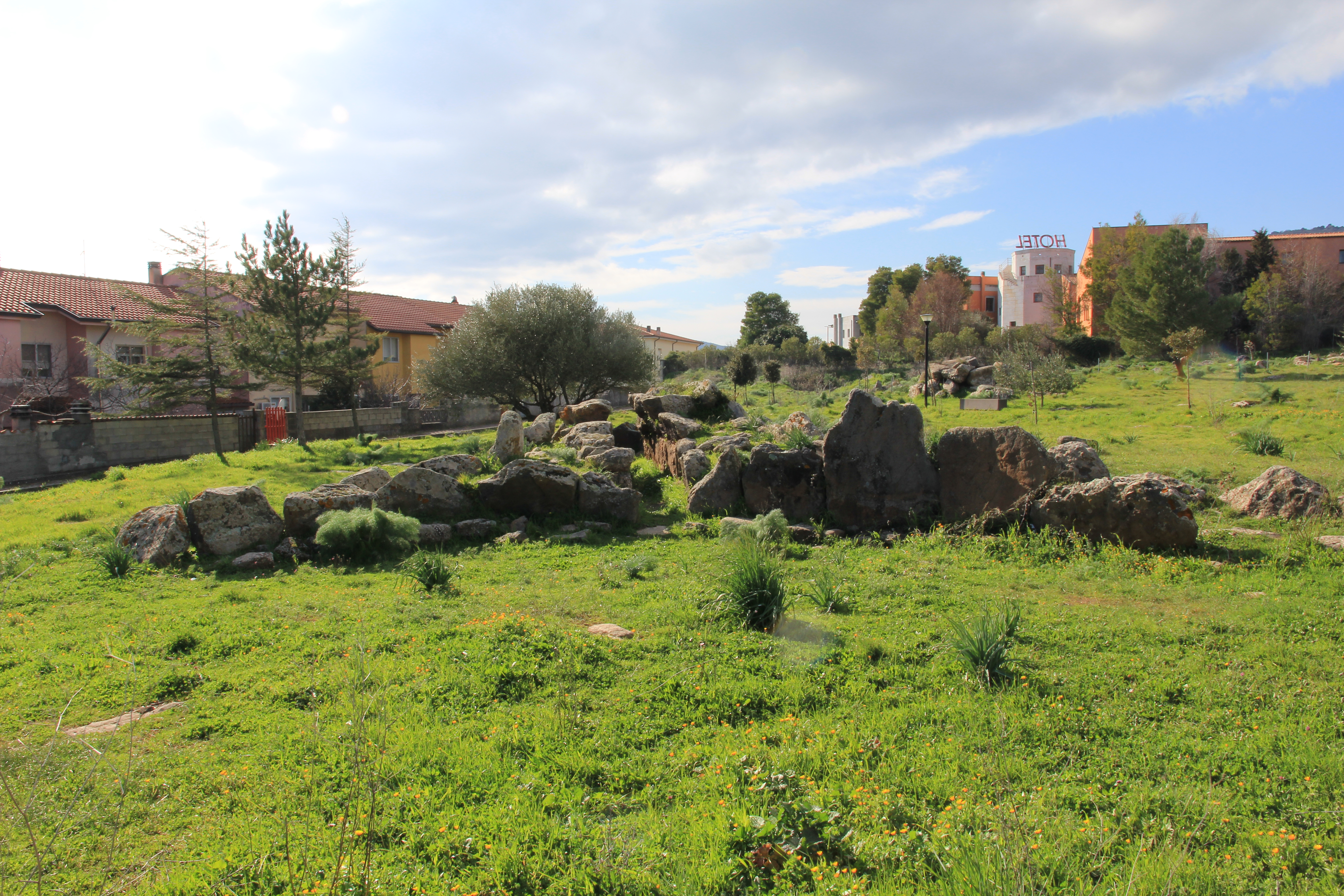
Tomb of the Giants of Palatu
