= Borore =

Borore Bòrore (Sardinian)
- Comune
- Comune di Borore
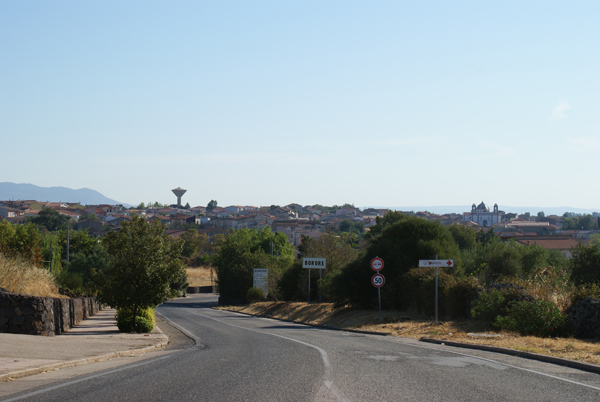
- View of Borore

- Coat of arms

- Location within Sardinia
- Coordinates: 40°13′N 8°47′E
- Country: Italy
- Region: Sardinia
- Province: Nuoro (NU)

Government
  - Mayor: Salvatore Ghisu

Area
  - Total: 42.68 km^{2} (16.48 sq mi)

Population (2026)
  - Total: 1,902
  - Density: 44.56/km^{2} (115.4/sq mi)
- Time zone: UTC+1 (CET)
  - Summer (DST): UTC+2 (CEST)
- Postal code: 08016
- Dialing code: 0785
- Website: Official website

Borore (Sardinian: Bòrore) is a town and comune (municipality) in the Province of Nuoro in the autonomous island region of Sardinia in Italy, located about 110 kilometres (68 mi) north of Cagliari and about 50 kilometres (31 mi) west of Nuoro. It has 1,902 inhabitants.

Borore borders the municipalities of Aidomaggiore, Birori, Dualchi, Macomer, Norbello, Santu Lussurgiu, and Scano di Montiferro.

== Demographics ==
As of 2026, the population is 1,902, of which 49.4% are male, and 50.6% are female. Minors make up 12.7% of the population, and seniors make up 32.3%.

Historical population

Year	Pop.	±%
1861	2,161	—
1871	2,093	−3.1%
1881	2,184	+4.3%
1901	2,155	−1.3%
1911	2,114	−1.9%
1921	2,371	+12.2%
1931	2,435	+2.7%
1936	2,527	+3.8%

Year	Pop.	±%
1951	2,917	+15.4%
1961	2,699	−7.5%
1971	2,225	−17.6%
1981	2,508	+12.7%
1991	2,531	+0.9%
2001	2,352	−7.1%
2011	2,190	−6.9%
2021	1,994	−8.9%

Source: ISTAT

=== Immigration ===
As of 2025, immigrants make up 5.1% of the population. The 5 largest foreign countries of birth are France, Germany, Romania, Belgium, and Spain.

== Gallery ==
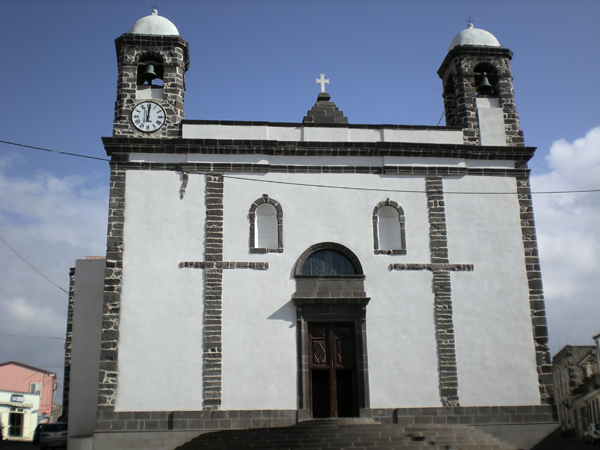
Church of Beata Vergine Assunta

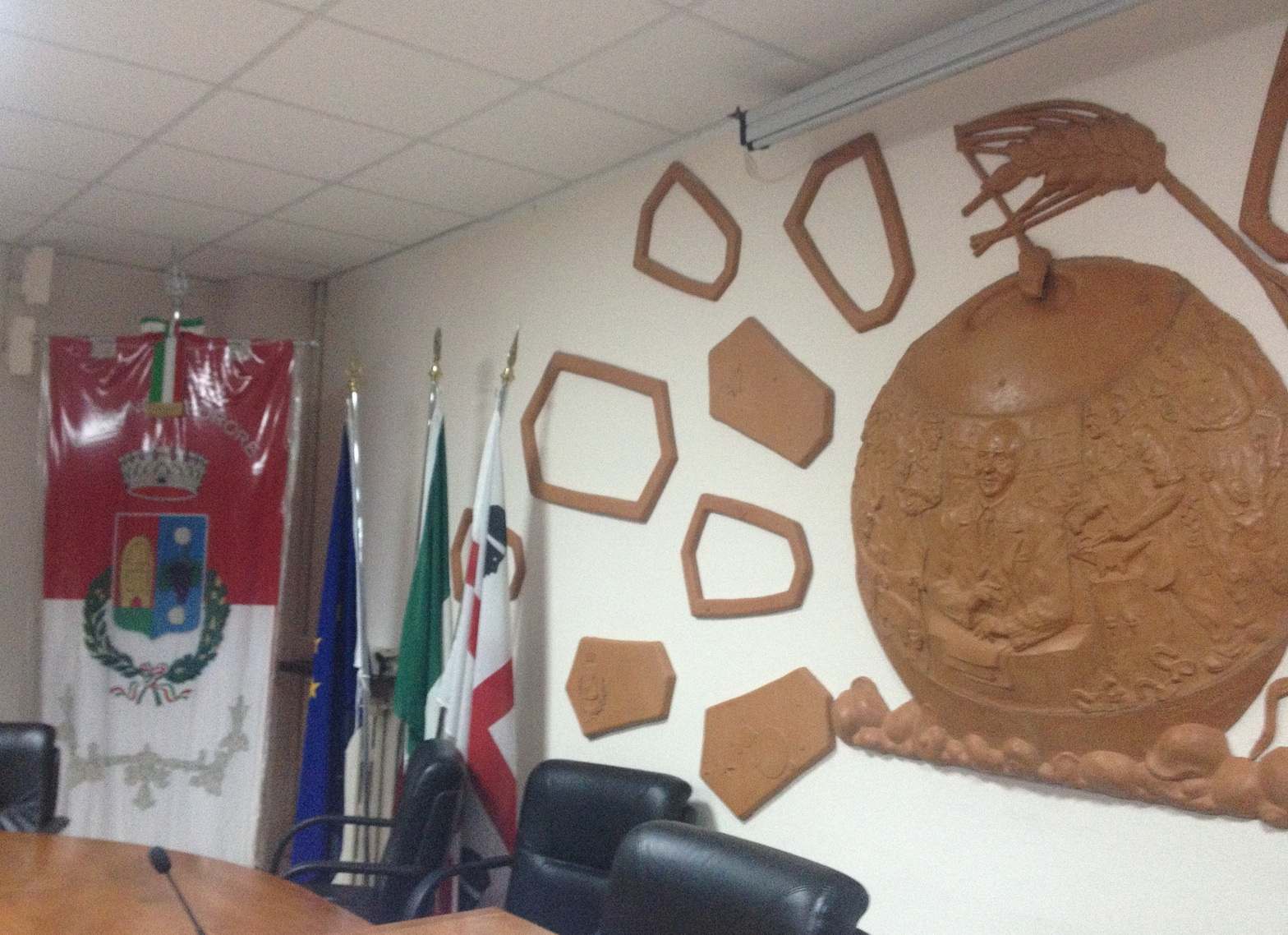
Council chamber

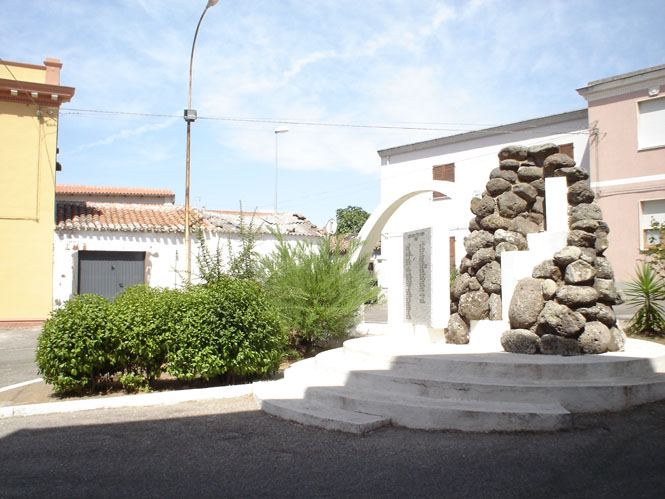
War memorial

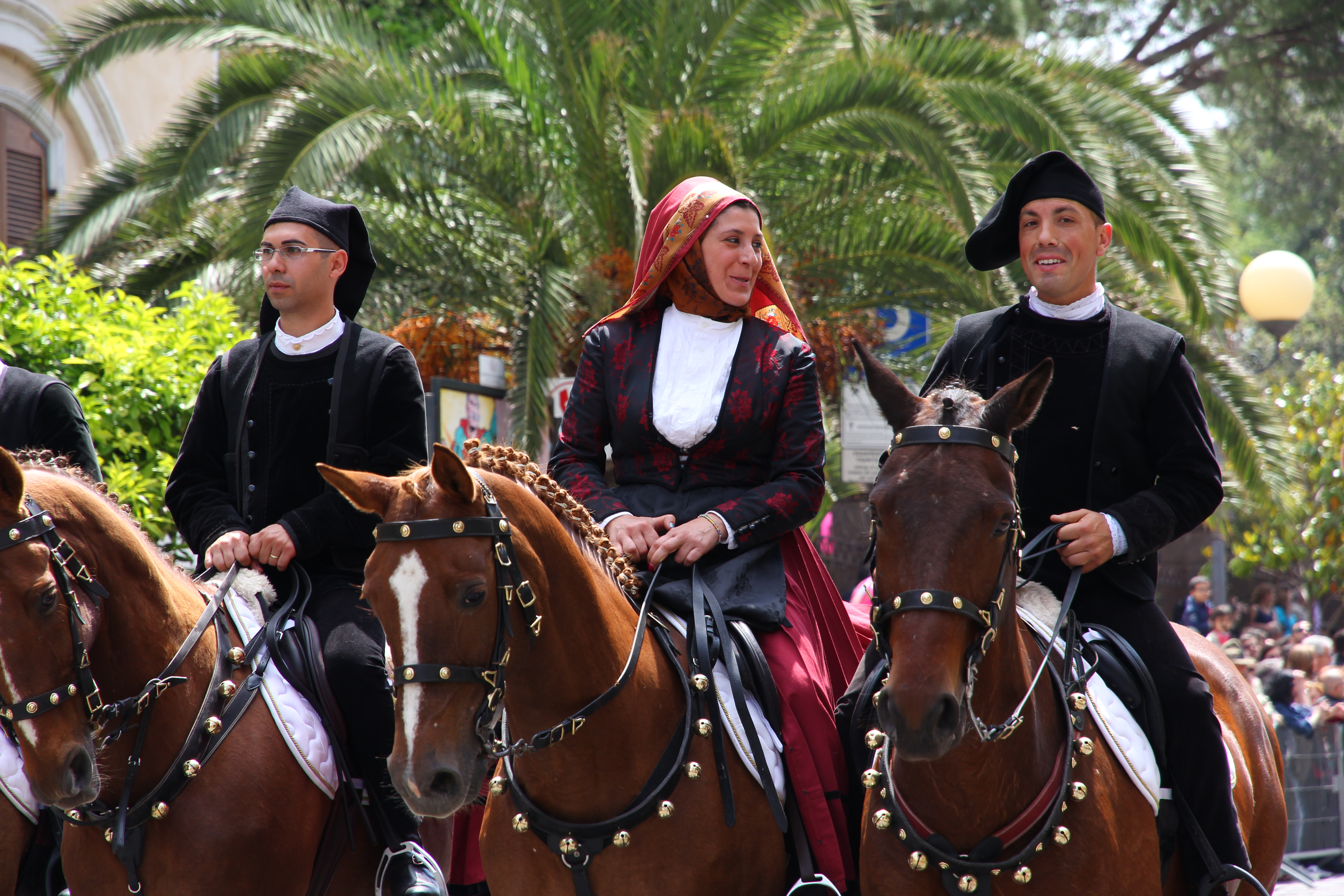
Traditional costumes of Borore

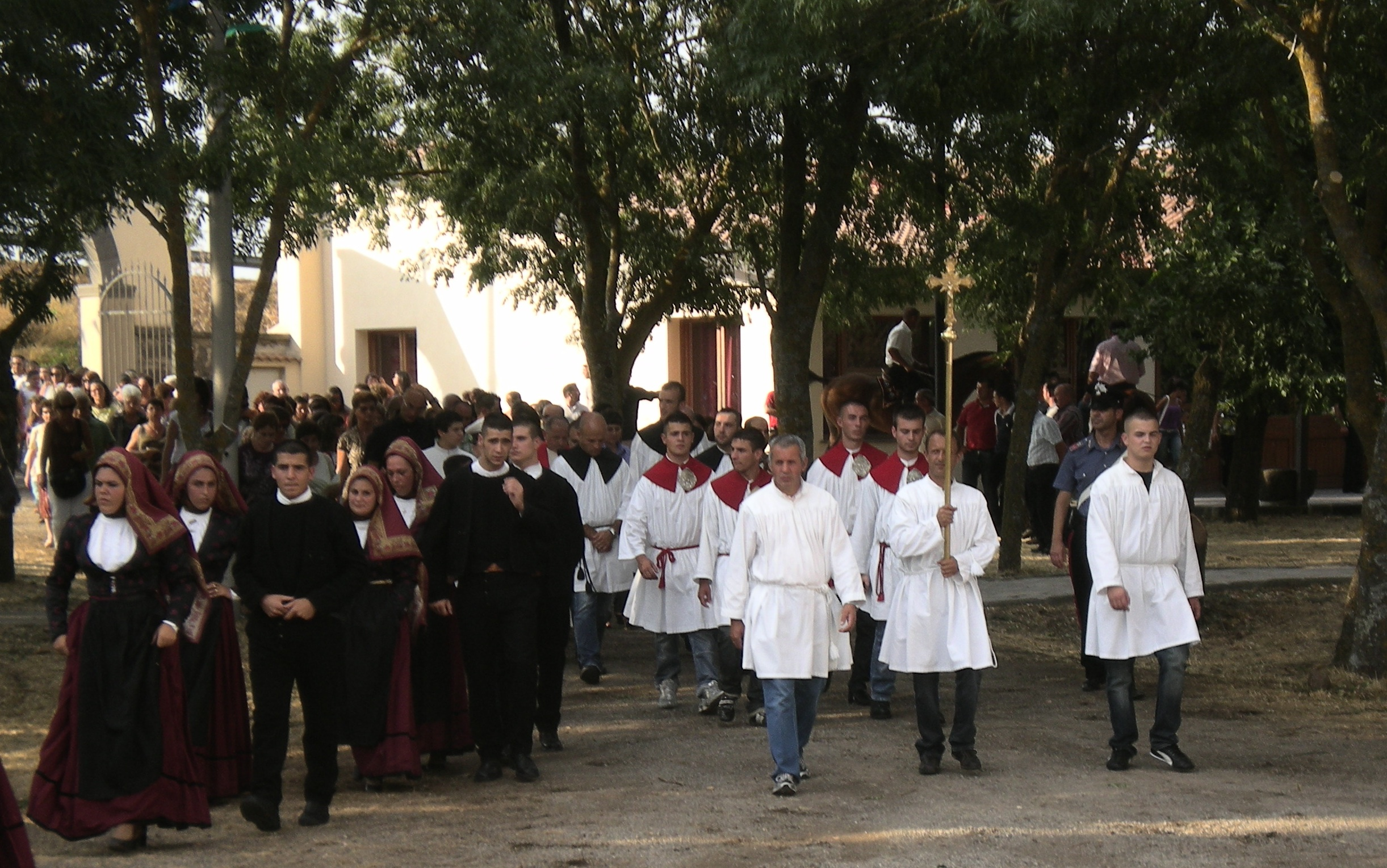
Procession of San Lussorio

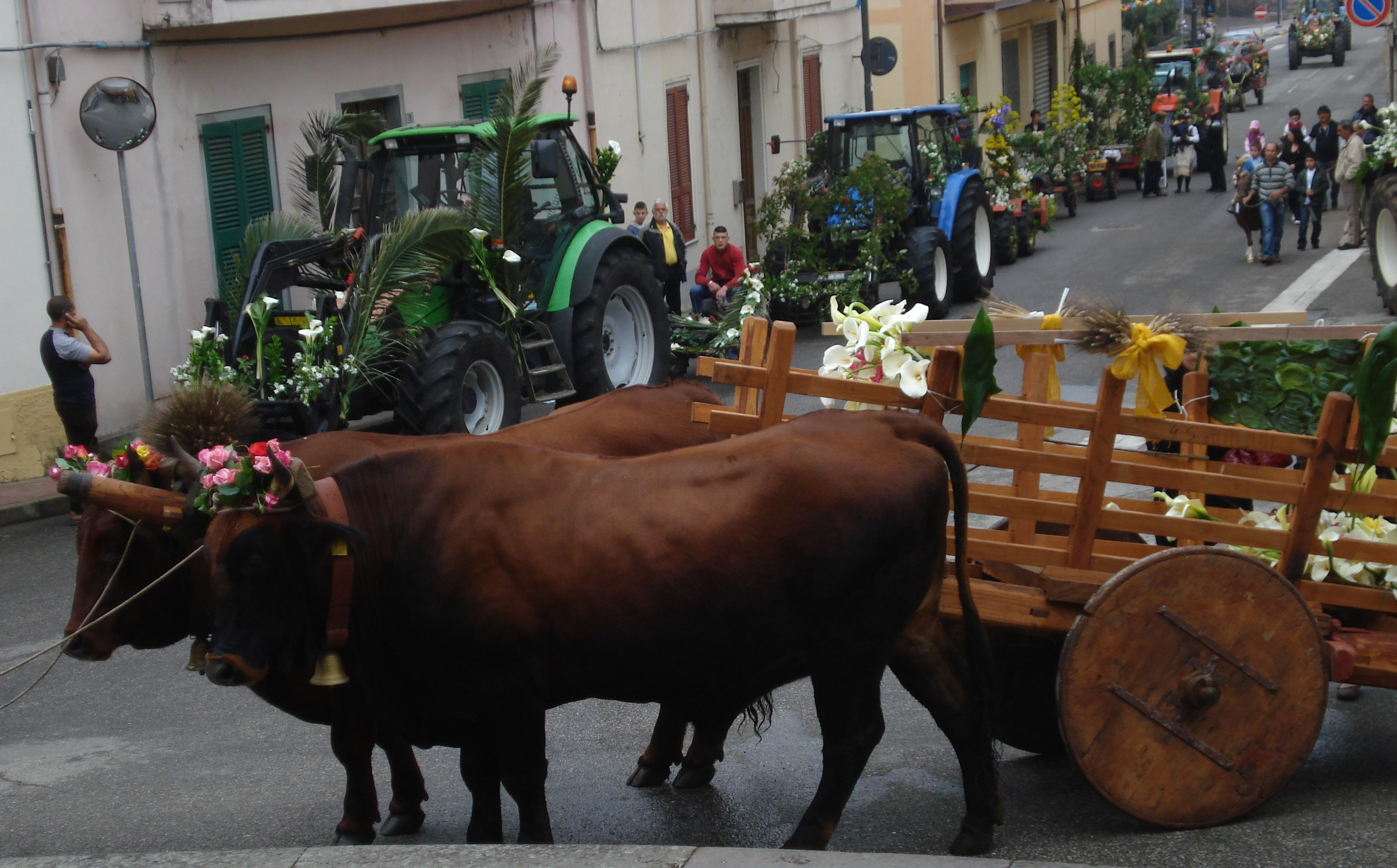
Procession of Sant'Isidoro

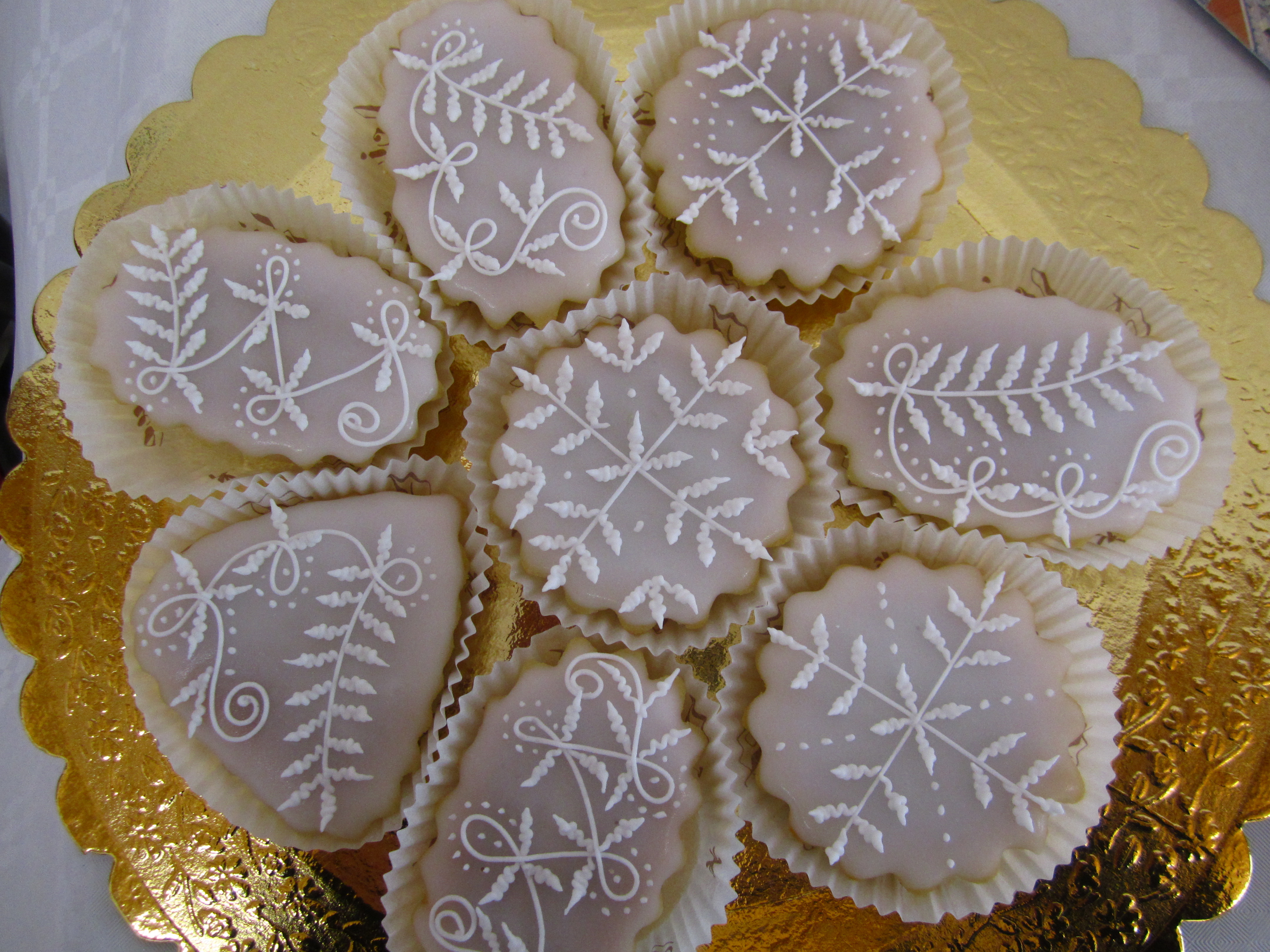
Sweets of Borore

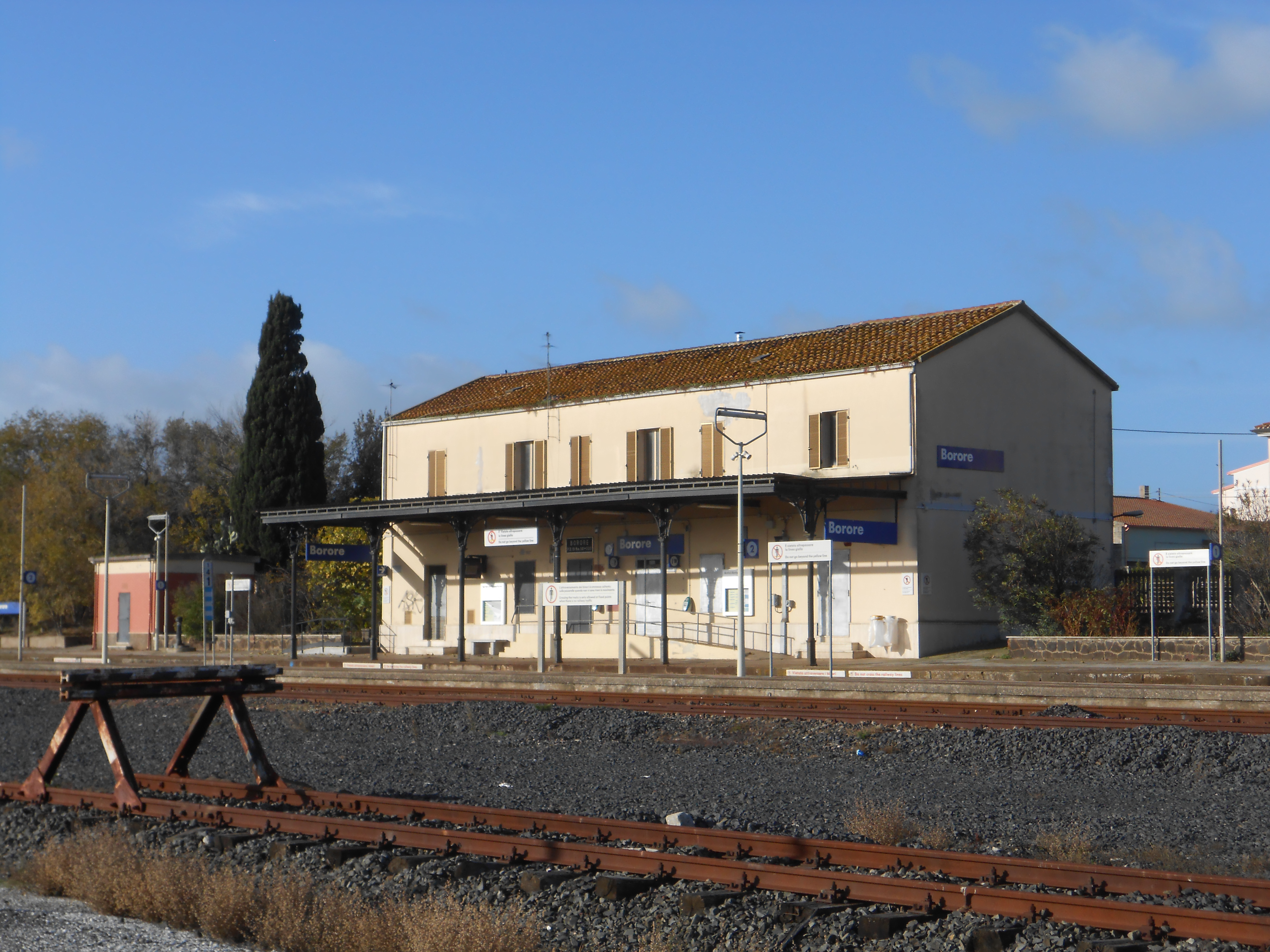
Train station in Borore
