= Oniferi =

Oniferi Onieri (Sardinian)
- Comune
- Comune di Oniferi
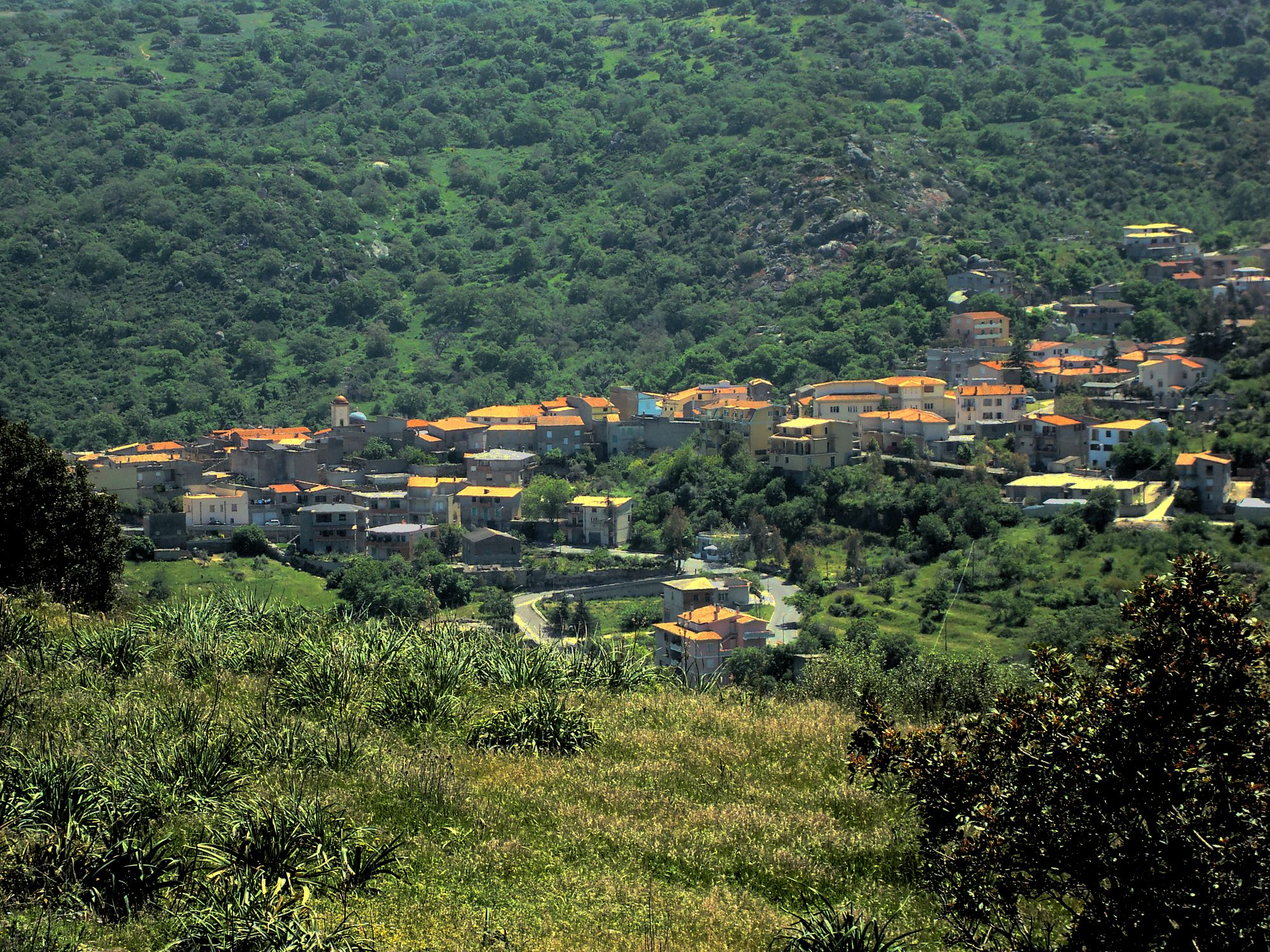
- View of Oniferi

- Location within Sardinia
- Coordinates: 40°16′N 9°10′E
- Country: Italy
- Region: Sardinia
- Province: Nuoro (NU)
- Frazioni: Sos Ermos

Government
  - Mayor: Stefania Piras

Area
  - Total: 35.67 km^{2} (13.77 sq mi)
- Elevation: 478 m (1,568 ft)

Population (2026)
  - Total: 823
  - Density: 23.1/km^{2} (59.8/sq mi)
- Demonym: Oniferesi
- Time zone: UTC+1 (CET)
  - Summer (DST): UTC+2 (CEST)
- Postal code: 08020
- Dialing code: 0784
- Website: Official website

Oniferi (Sardinian: Onieri) is a town and comune (municipality) in the Province of Nuoro in the autonomous island region of Sardinia in Italy, located about 120 kilometres (75 mi) north of Cagliari and about 15 kilometres (9 mi) southwest of Nuoro. It has 823 inhabitants.

The Oniferi economy is mostly based on animal husbandry. Sights include several Nuragic and pre-Nuragic archaeological sites, such as the Necropolis of Sas Concas.

Oniferi borders the municipalities of Benetutti, Bono, Orani, and Orotelli.

== Demographics ==
As of 2026, the population is 823, of which 50.7% are male, and 49.3% are female. Minors make up 15.4% of the population, and seniors make up 24.7%.

Historical population

Year	Pop.	±%
1861	670	—
1871	711	+6.1%
1881	750	+5.5%
1901	872	+16.3%
1911	930	+6.7%
1921	1,050	+12.9%
1931	1,031	−1.8%
1936	1,093	+6.0%

Year	Pop.	±%
1951	1,111	+1.6%
1961	1,126	+1.4%
1971	1,027	−8.8%
1981	1,067	+3.9%
1991	1,003	−6.0%
2001	959	−4.4%
2011	925	−3.5%
2021	873	−5.6%

Source: ISTAT

=== Immigration ===
As of 2025, immigrants make up 4.4% of the population. The 5 largest foreign countries of birth are Morocco, Romania, Albania, Belgium, and Germany.
