= Lei, Sardinia =

Lei
- Comune
- Comune di Lei
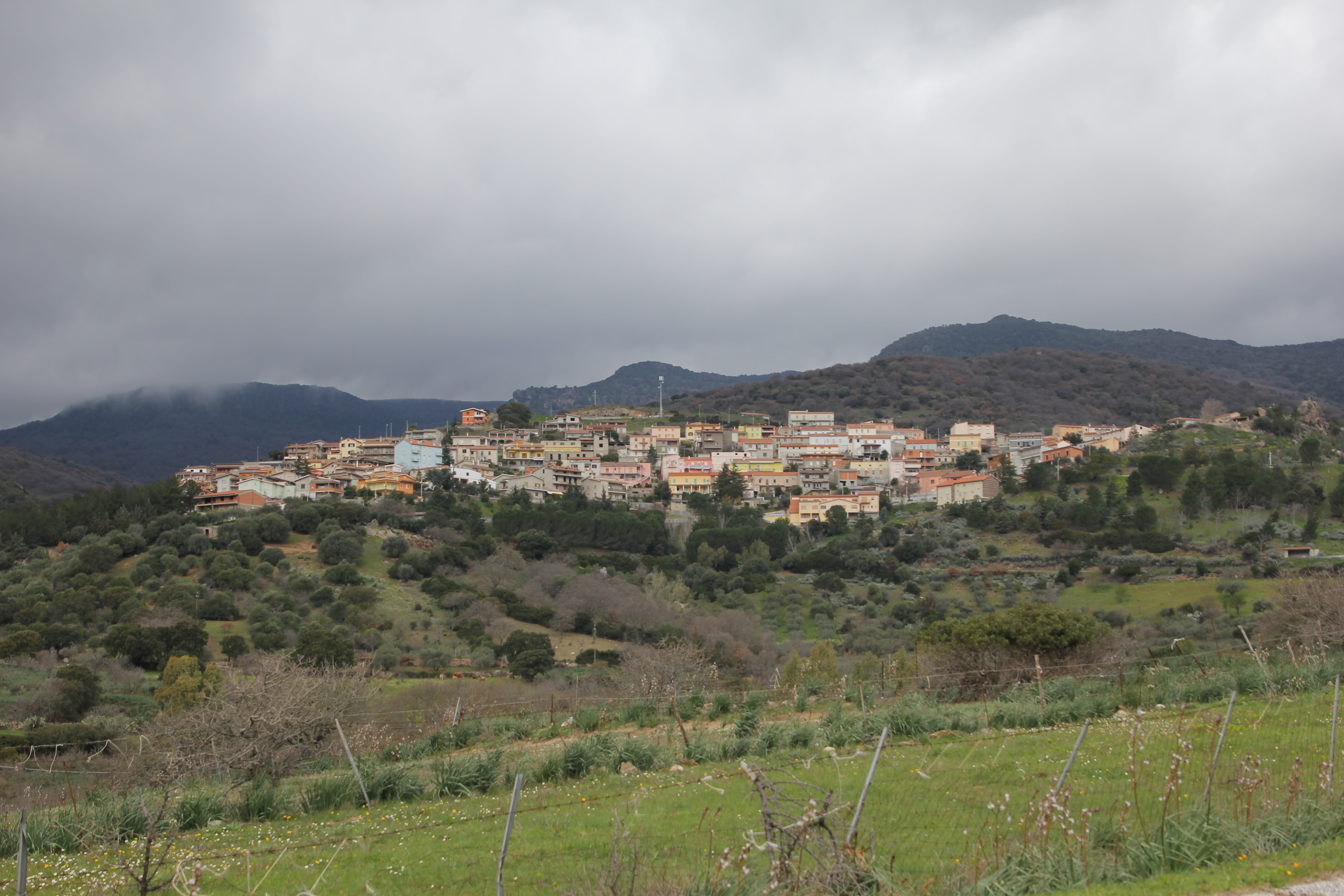
- View of Lei

- Location within Sardinia
- Coordinates: 40°18′N 8°55′E
- Country: Italy
- Region: Sardinia
- Province: Province of Nuoro (NU)

Area
  - Total: 19.11 km^{2} (7.38 sq mi)
- Elevation: 450 m (1,480 ft)

Population (2026)
  - Total: 433
  - Density: 22.7/km^{2} (58.7/sq mi)
- Demonym: Leiesi
- Time zone: UTC+1 (CET)
  - Summer (DST): UTC+2 (CEST)
- Postal code: 08010
- Dialing code: 0785

Lei is a village and comune (municipality) in the Province of Nuoro in the autonomous island region of Sardinia in Italy, located about 120 kilometres (75 mi) north of Cagliari and about 35 kilometres (22 mi) west of Nuoro. It has 433 inhabitants.

Lei borders the municipalities of Bolotana and Silanus.

== Demographics ==
As of 2026, the population is 433, of which 52.2% are male, and 47.8% are female. Minors make up 7.9% of the population, and seniors make up 38.3%.

Historical population

Year	Pop.	±%
1861	401	—
1871	418	+4.2%
1881	422	+1.0%
1901	489	+15.9%
1911	606	+23.9%
1921	572	−5.6%
1931	591	+3.3%
1936	625	+5.8%

Year	Pop.	±%
1951	719	+15.0%
1961	750	+4.3%
1971	632	−15.7%
1981	694	+9.8%
1991	696	+0.3%
2001	645	−7.3%
2011	566	−12.2%
2021	470	−17.0%

Source: ISTAT

=== Immigration ===
As of 2025, immigrants make up 6.1% of the population. The 5 largest foreign countries of birth are Morocco, Belgium, Romania, Germany, and Algeria.
