= Silanus, Sardinia =

Silanus Silanos (Sardinian)
- Comune
- Comune di Silanus
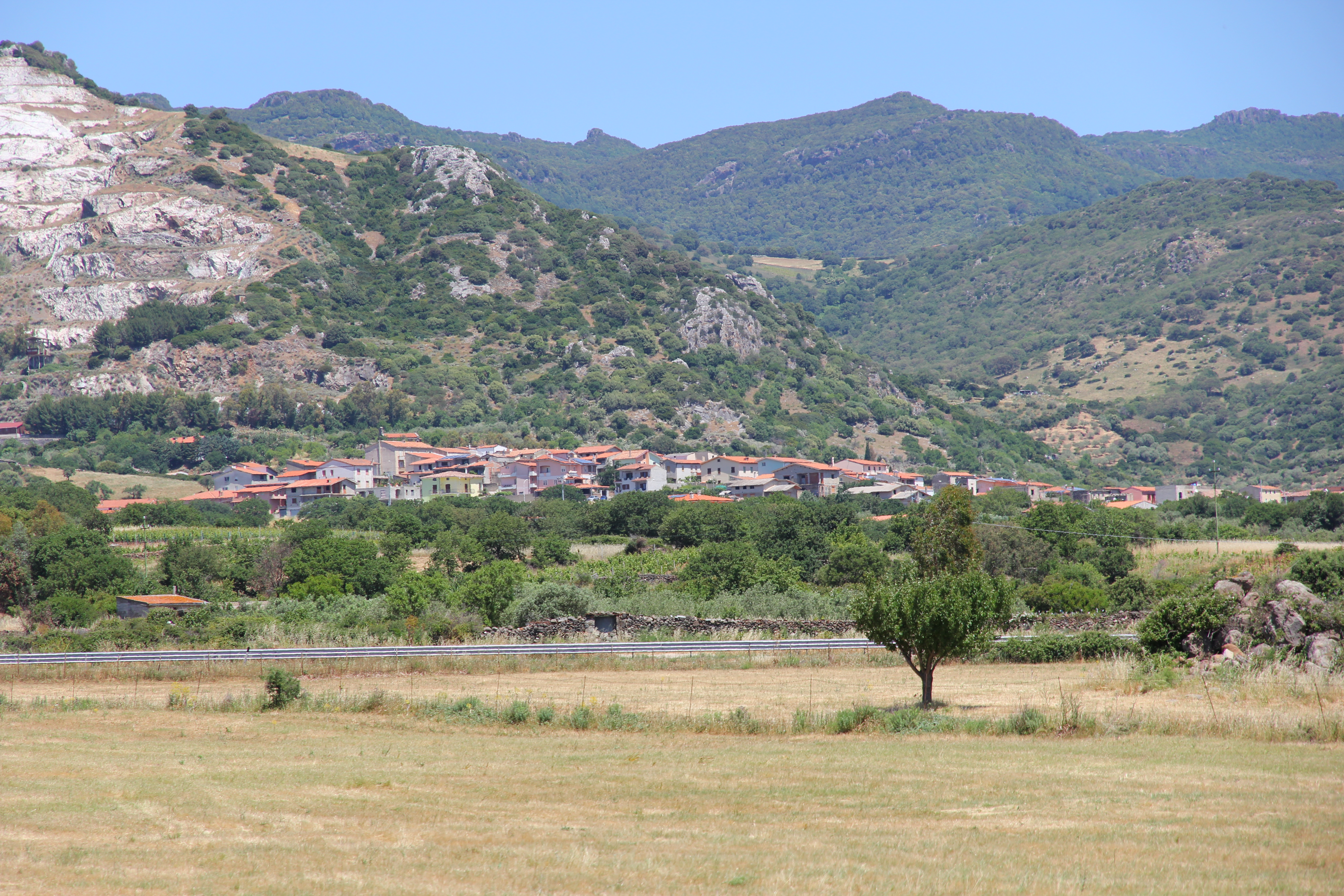
- View of Silanus

- Location within Sardinia
- Coordinates: 40°17′N 8°53′E
- Country: Italy
- Region: Sardinia
- Province: Nuoro (NU)

Area
  - Total: 47.94 km^{2} (18.51 sq mi)

Population (2026)
  - Total: 1,891
  - Density: 39.45/km^{2} (102.2/sq mi)
- Demonym: Silanesi silanesos conchidortos
- Time zone: UTC+1 (CET)
  - Summer (DST): UTC+2 (CEST)
- Postal code: 08017
- Dialing code: 0785

Silanus (Sardinian: Silanos) is a town and comune (municipality) in the Province of Nuoro in the autonomous island region of Sardinia in Italy, located about 120 kilometres (75 mi) north of Cagliari and about 40 kilometres (25 mi) west of Nuoro. It has 1,891 inhabitants.

Silanus borders the municipalities of Bolotana, Bortigali, Dualchi, Lei, and Noragugume.

== Demographics ==
As of 2026, the population is 1,891, of which 49.0% are male, and 51.0% are female. Minors make up 12.8% of the population, and seniors make up 31.0%.

Historical population

Year	Pop.	±%
1861	1,718	—
1871	1,815	+5.6%
1881	2,062	+13.6%
1901	2,323	+12.7%
1911	2,462	+6.0%
1921	2,421	−1.7%
1931	2,603	+7.5%
1936	2,709	+4.1%

Year	Pop.	±%
1951	2,847	+5.1%
1961	3,027	+6.3%
1971	2,543	−16.0%
1981	2,571	+1.1%
1991	2,516	−2.1%
2001	2,394	−4.8%
2011	2,200	−8.1%
2021	2,018	−8.3%

Source: ISTAT

=== Immigration ===
As of 2025, immigrants make up 3.3% of the population. The 5 largest foreign countries of birth are Romania, Germany, France, Belgium, and Jordan.
