= Bortigali =

Bortigali Bortigale (Sardinian)
- Comune
- Comune di Bortigali
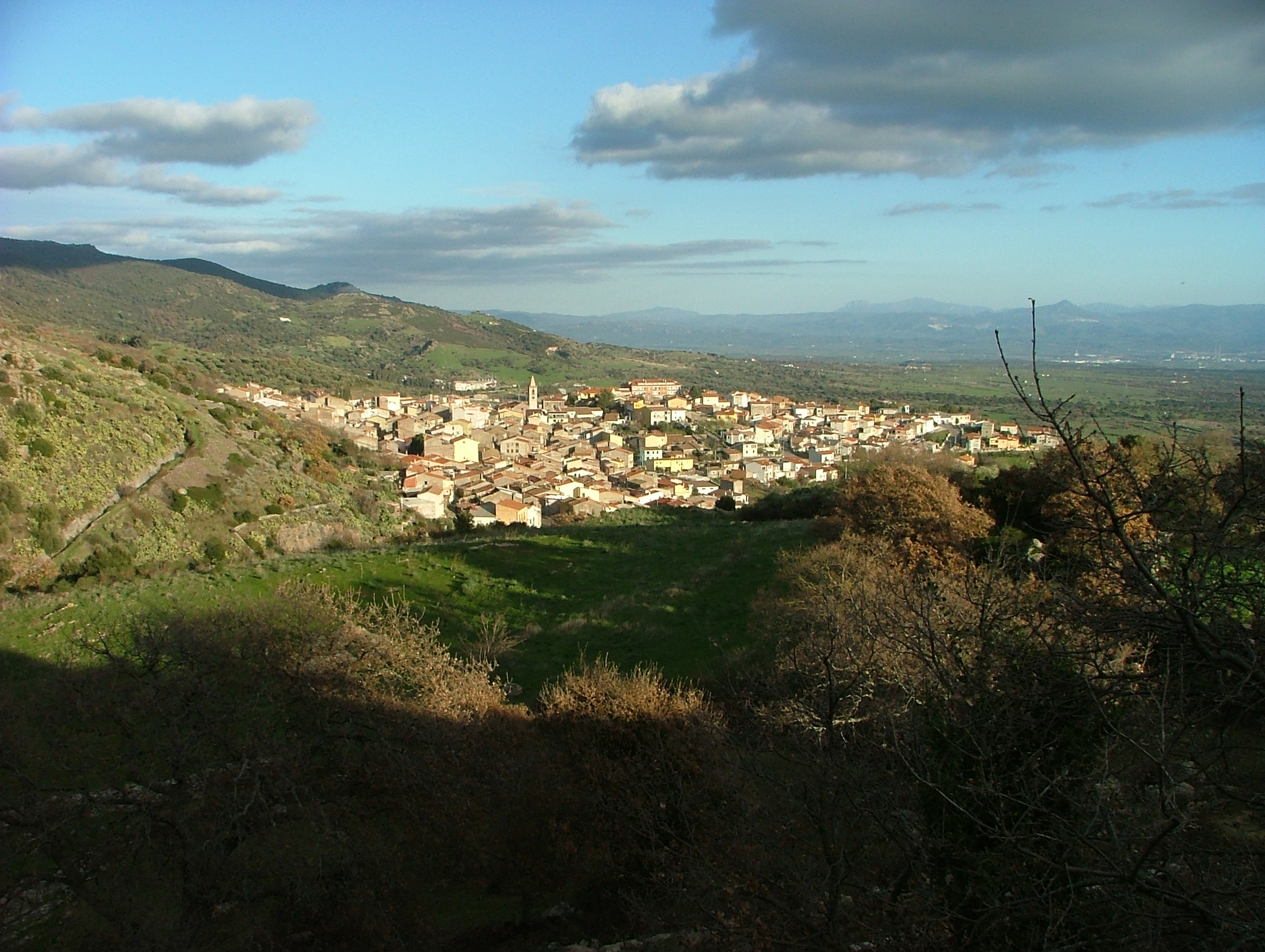
- View of Bortigali

- Location within Sardinia
- Coordinates: 40°17′N 8°50′E
- Country: Italy
- Region: Sardinia
- Province: Province of Nuoro (NU)
- Frazioni: Mulargia

Area
  - Total: 67.33 km^{2} (26.00 sq mi)
- Elevation: 510 m (1,670 ft)

Population (2026)
  - Total: 1,218
  - Density: 18.09/km^{2} (46.85/sq mi)
- Demonym: Bortigalesi
- Time zone: UTC+1 (CET)
  - Summer (DST): UTC+2 (CEST)
- Postal code: 08012
- Dialing code: 0785

Bortigali (Sardinian: Bortigale) is a town and comune (municipality) in the Province of Nuoro in the autonomous island region of Sardinia in Italy, located about 120 kilometres (75 mi) north of Cagliari and about 45 kilometres (28 mi) west of Nuoro. It has 1,218 inhabitants.

The municipality of Bortigali contains the frazione (subdivision) Mulargia, and borders the municipalities of Birori, Bolotana, Dualchi, Macomer, and Silanus.

== Climate ==
Climate data for Bortigali
Month	Jan	Feb	Mar	Apr	May	Jun	Jul	Aug	Sep	Oct	Nov	Dec	Year
Mean daily maximum °C (°F)	9 (48)	10 (50)	12 (53)	15 (59)	19 (66)	24 (75)	28 (82)	28 (82)	24 (75)	19 (66)	13 (55)	10 (50)	17 (62)
Mean daily minimum °C (°F)	3 (37)	3 (37)	5 (41)	7 (44)	10 (50)	13 (55)	16 (60)	17 (62)	14 (57)	10 (50)	7 (44)	5 (41)	9 (48)
Average precipitation mm (inches)	99 (3.9)	110 (4.4)	81 (3.2)	71 (2.8)	38 (1.5)	33 (1.3)	5.1 (0.2)	13 (0.5)	41 (1.6)	97 (3.8)	130 (5.1)	120 (4.6)	830 (32.8)
Source: Weatherbase

== Demographics ==
As of 2026, the population is 1,218, of which 47.5% are male, and 52.5% are female. Minors make up 10.1% of the population, and seniors make up 35.1%.

Historical population

Year	Pop.	±%
1861	2,972	—
1871	3,043	+2.4%
1881	3,019	−0.8%
1901	3,150	+4.3%
1911	3,129	−0.7%
1921	2,939	−6.1%
1931	2,749	−6.5%
1936	2,782	+1.2%

Year	Pop.	±%
1951	2,795	+0.5%
1961	2,491	−10.9%
1971	1,904	−23.6%
1981	1,780	−6.5%
1991	1,723	−3.2%
2001	1,543	−10.4%
2011	1,417	−8.2%
2021	1,205	−15.0%

Source: ISTAT

=== Immigration ===
As of 2025, immigrants make up 7.5% of the population. The 5 largest foreign countries of birth are Romania, Switzerland, Morocco, Argentina, and France.
