= Dualchi =

Dualchi Duarche (Sardinian)
- Comune
- Comune di Dualchi
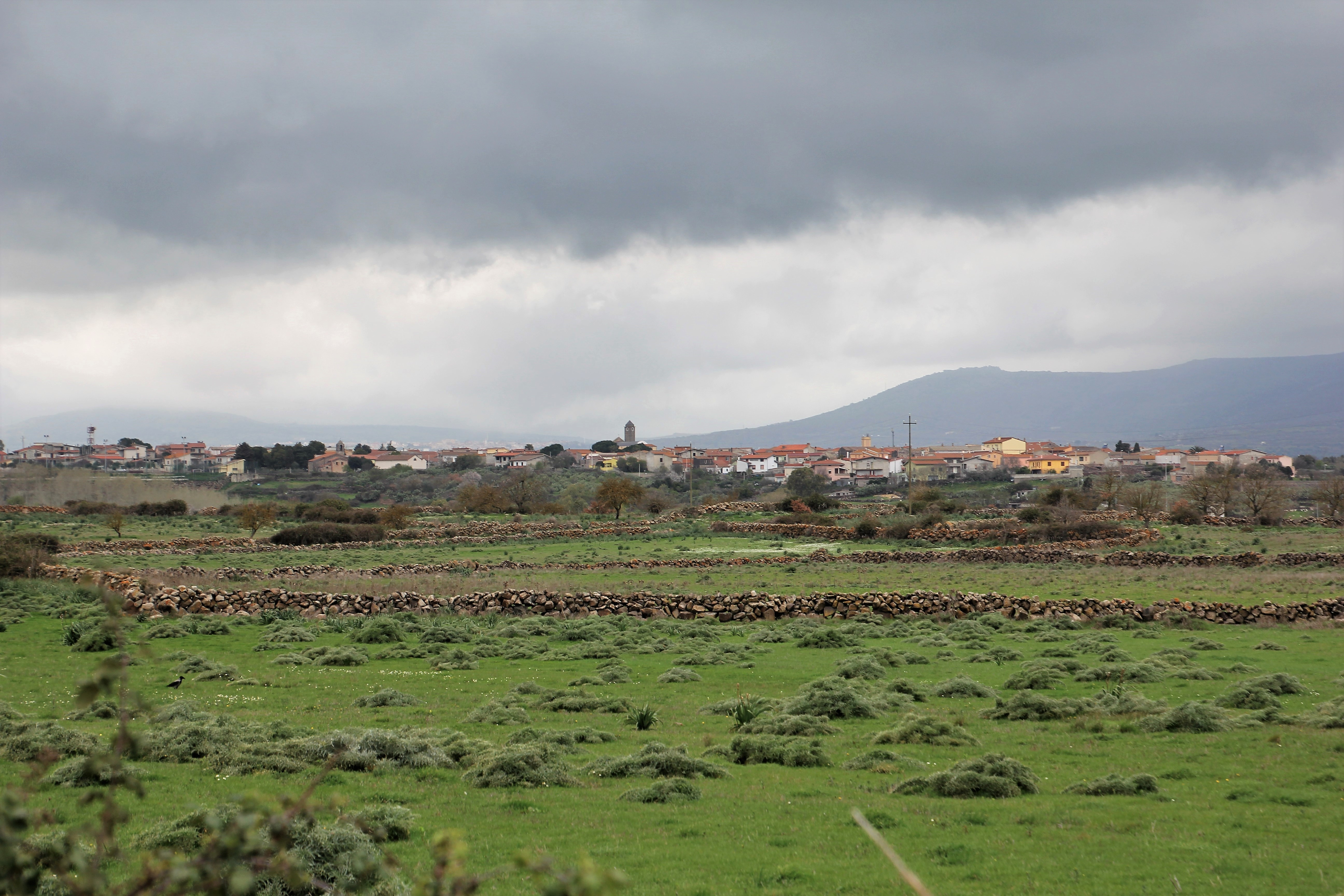
- View of Dualchi

- Coat of arms

- Location within Sardinia
- Coordinates: 40°14′N 8°54′E
- Country: Italy
- Region: Sardinia
- Province: Nuoro (NU)

Government
  - Mayor: Ignazio Piras

Area
  - Total: 23.41 km^{2} (9.04 sq mi)
- Elevation: 321 m (1,053 ft)

Population (2026)
  - Total: 559
  - Density: 23.9/km^{2} (61.8/sq mi)
- Demonym: Dualchesi
- Time zone: UTC+1 (CET)
  - Summer (DST): UTC+2 (CEST)
- Postal code: 08010
- Dialing code: 0785
- Website: Official website

Dualchi (Sardinian: Duarche) is a village and comune (municipality) in the Province of Nuoro in the autonomous island region of Sardinia in Italy, located about 110 kilometres (68 mi) north of Cagliari and about 40 kilometres (25 mi) west of Nuoro. It has 559 inhabitants.

Dualchi borders the municipalities of Aidomaggiore, Birori, Borore, Bortigali, Noragugume, Sedilo, and Silanus.

== History ==
Already inhabited area during the Nuragic period, as suggested by the presence in the territory of some Nuraghes, Dualchi belonged to the Judicate of Torress in the Middle Ages and was part of the curatoria of Marghine. The village came under the influence of the Arborean Judges, when such curatoria became absorbed into the Arborean curatoria of Parte Barigadu. Upon the fall of the Arborean Judicate (1429), Dualchi became part of the Aragonese marquisate of Oristano. During the war, fought in 1478, between the Marquis of Oristano Leonardo Alagon and the viceroy of Aragon, the inhabitants of Dualchi swore allegiance to the Marquis and thereupon fought against the Aragonese, but they were defeated. The town then passed under Aragonese rule and became a fief thereof. In the 18th century it was incorporated into the marquisate of Marghine, the owners of which were the Pimentel. From the Pimentel it passed to the Tellez-Giron, to which it was ransomed in 1839 with the abolition of the feudal system.

== Demographics ==
As of 2026, the population is 559, of which 47.9% are male, and 52.1% are female. Minors make up 9.7% of the population, and seniors make up 36.0%.

Historical population

Year	Pop.	±%
1861	671	—
1871	669	−0.3%
1881	701	+4.8%
1901	754	+7.6%
1911	755	+0.1%
1921	744	−1.5%
1931	819	+10.1%
1936	847	+3.4%

Year	Pop.	±%
1951	954	+12.6%
1961	919	−3.7%
1971	753	−18.1%
1981	829	+10.1%
1991	817	−1.4%
2001	764	−6.5%
2011	668	−12.6%
2021	576	−13.8%

Source: ISTAT

=== Immigration ===
As of 2025, immigrants make up 4.9% of the population. The 5 largest foreign countries of birth are Germany, Morocco, Romania, Switzerland, and Ukraine.

== Cuisine ==
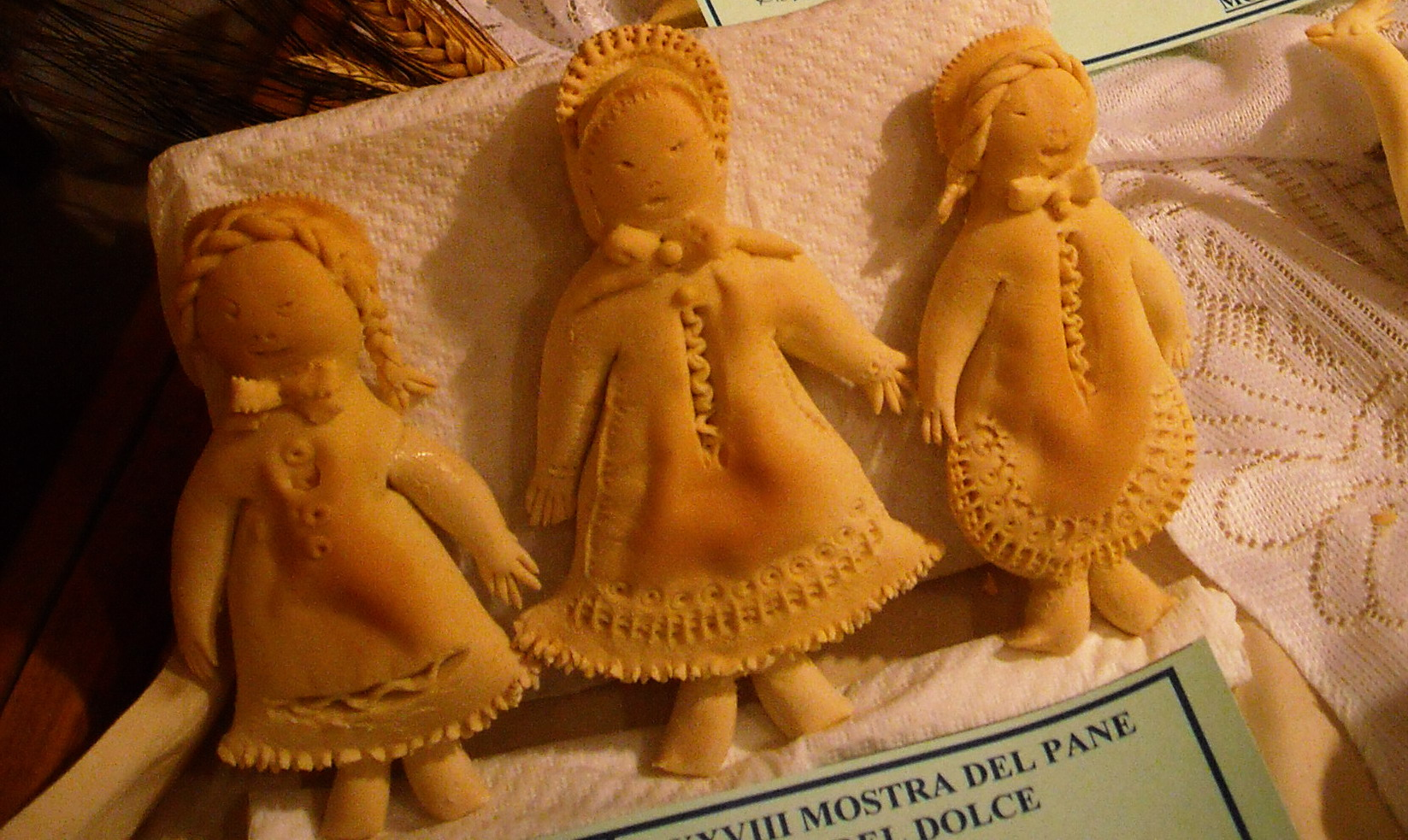
Traditional bread-made dolls from Dualchi

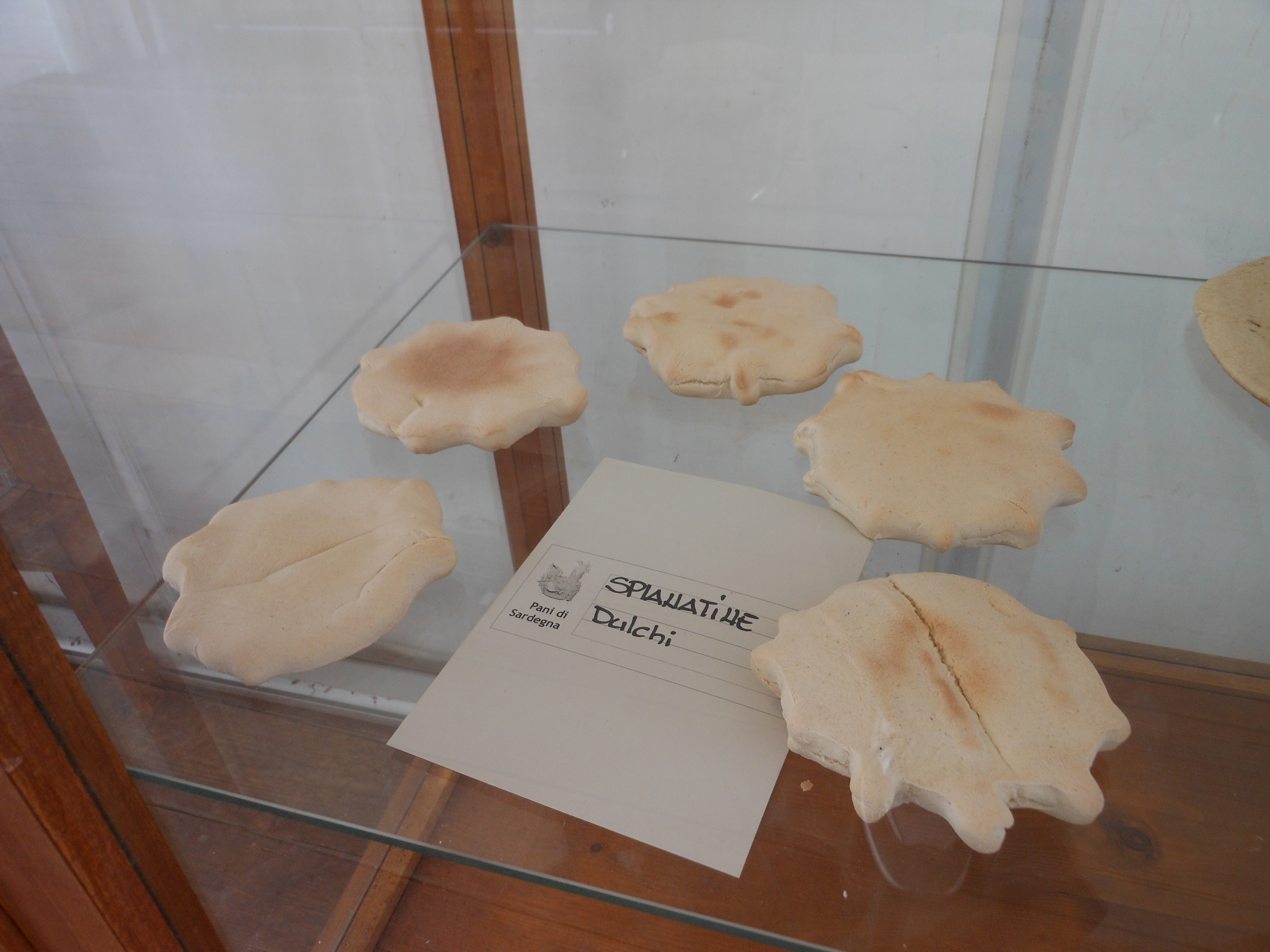
Spianata (Pane 'e poddine) from Dualchi
