= Noragugume =

Noragugume Noragùgume (Sardinian)
- Comune
- Comune di Noragugume
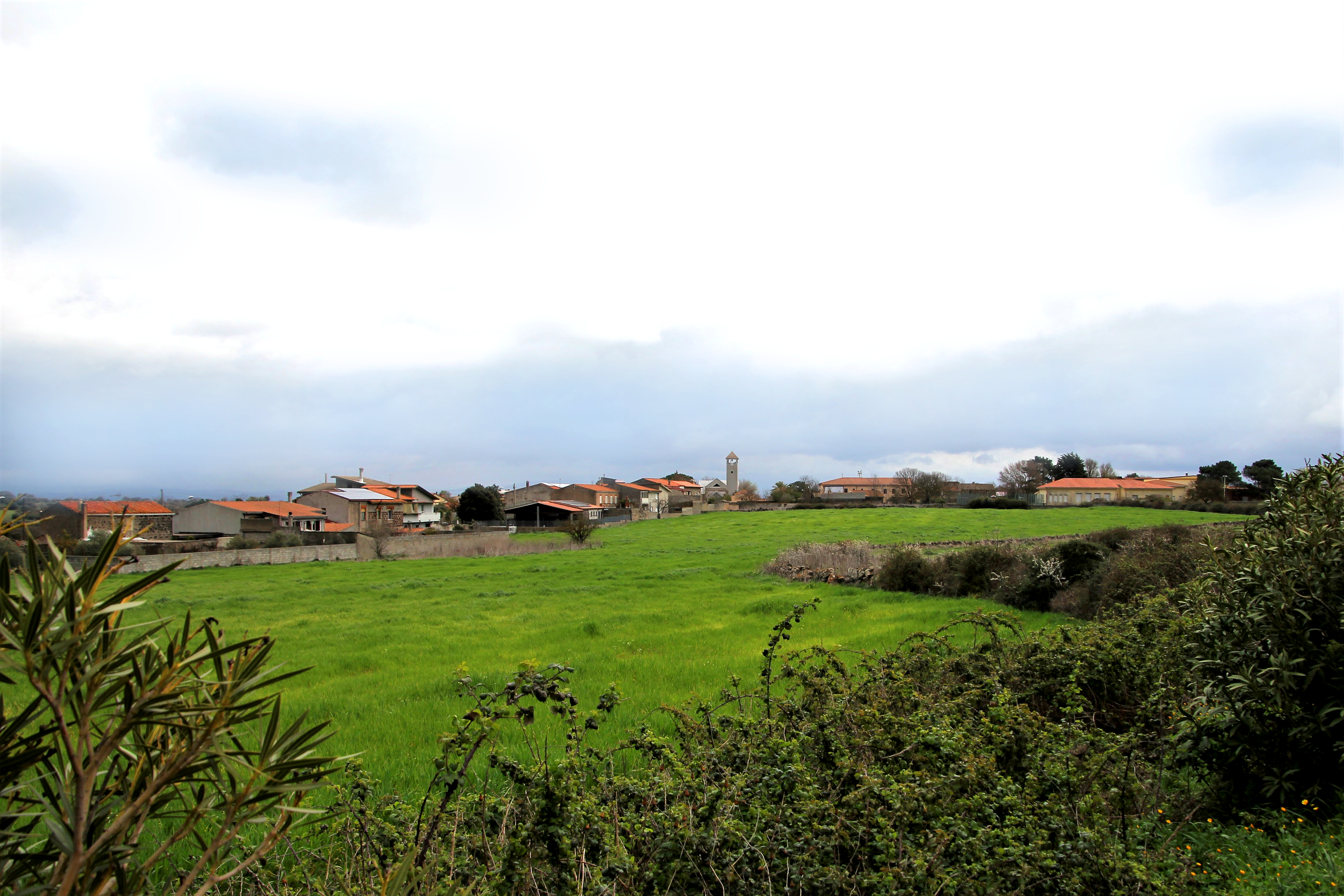
- View of Noragugume

- Location within Sardinia
- Coordinates: 40°14′N 8°55′E
- Country: Italy
- Region: Sardinia
- Province: Nuoro (NU)

Government
  - Mayor: Federico Pirosu

Area
  - Total: 26.73 km^{2} (10.32 sq mi)
- Elevation: 288 m (945 ft)

Population (2026)
  - Total: 269
  - Density: 10.1/km^{2} (26.1/sq mi)
- Demonym: Noragugumesi
- Time zone: UTC+1 (CET)
  - Summer (DST): UTC+2 (CEST)
- Postal code: 08010
- Dialing code: 0785
- Website: Official website

Noragugume (Sardinian: Noragùgume) is a village and comune (municipality) in the Province of Nuoro in the autonomous island region of Sardinia in Italy, located about 110 kilometres (68 mi) north of Cagliari and about 35 kilometres (22 mi) west of Nuoro. It has 269 inhabitants.

Noragugume borders the municipalities of Bolotana, Dualchi, Ottana, Sedilo, and Silanus.

== Demographics ==
As of 2026, the population is 269, of which 47.6% are male, and 52.4% are female. Minors make up 8.2% of the population, and seniors make up 28.6%.

Historical population

Year	Pop.	±%
1861	603	—
1871	587	−2.7%
1881	526	−10.4%
1901	569	+8.2%
1911	562	−1.2%
1921	490	−12.8%
1931	575	+17.3%
1936	599	+4.2%

Year	Pop.	±%
1951	692	+15.5%
1961	658	−4.9%
1971	467	−29.0%
1981	478	+2.4%
1991	424	−11.3%
2001	378	−10.8%
2011	338	−10.6%
2021	286	−15.4%

Source: ISTAT

=== Immigration ===
As of 2025, immigrants make up 3.8% of the population. The 5 largest foreign countries of birth are Senegal, Germany, Morocco, France, and Nigeria.
