= Province of Nuoro =

Province of Italy

Coordinates: 40°19′N 9°20′E

Province of Nuoro Provincia di Nuoro (Italian) Provìntzia de Nùgoro (Sardinian)
- Province
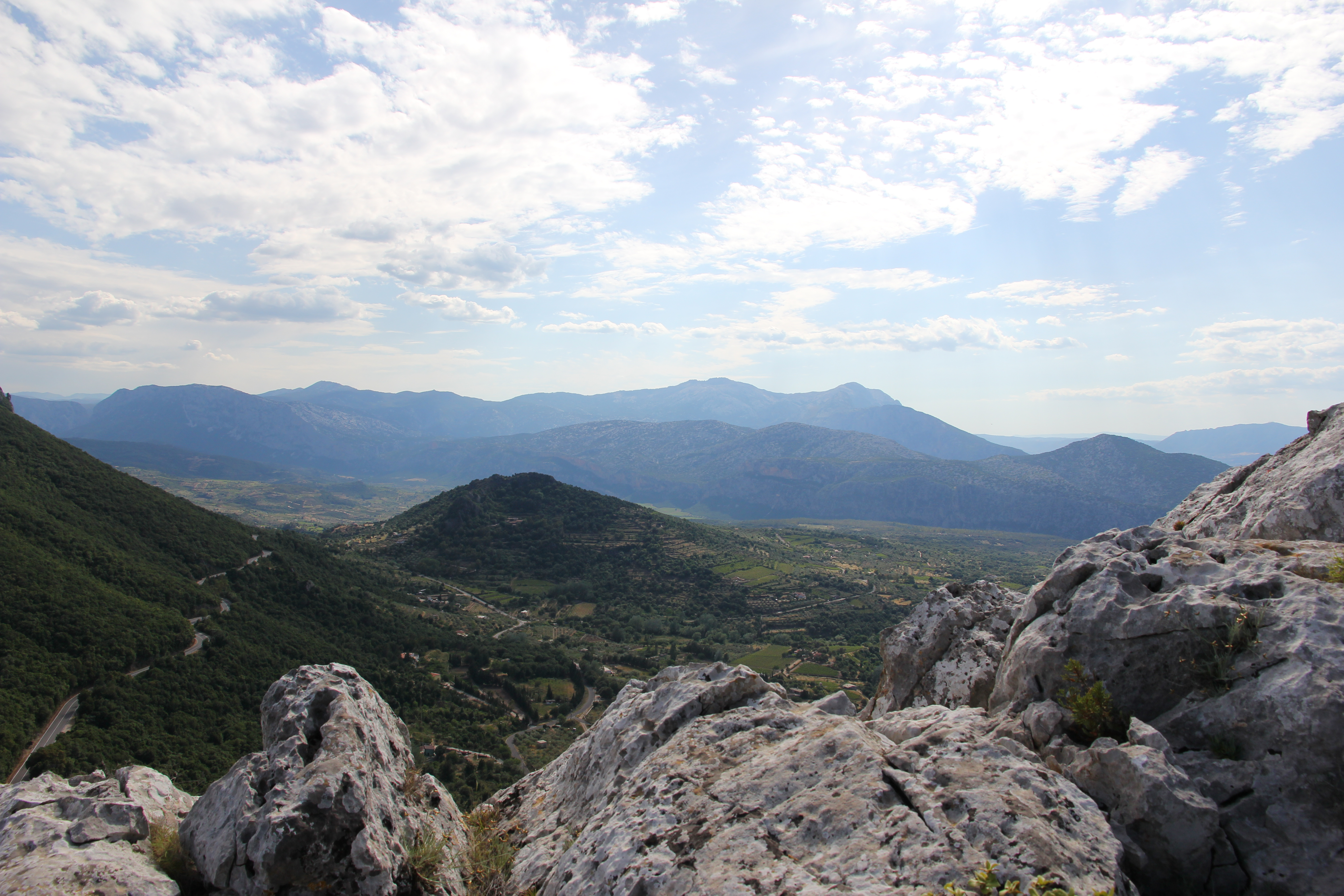
- View of the Supramonte mountain range

- Flag Coat of arms

- Location of the province of Nuoro in Italy
- Country: Italy
- Region: Sardinia
- Established: 1927
- Capital(s): Nuoro
- Municipalities: 53

Government
  - President: Giuseppe Ciccolini

Area
  - Total: 3,990.47 km^{2} (1,540.73 sq mi)

Population (2026)
  - Total: 142,241
  - Density: 35.6452/km^{2} (92.3206/sq mi)

GDP
  - Total: €2.943 billion (2015)
  - Per capita: €18,656 (2015)
- Time zone: UTC+1 (CET)
  - Summer (DST): UTC+2 (CEST)
- Postal code: 08010-08040, 08042-08049, 08100
- Telephone prefix: 070, 079, 0484, 0782, 0784, 0785
- Vehicle registration: NU
- ISTAT code: 091

The province of Nuoro (Italian: provincia di Nuoro; Sardinian: provìntzia de Nùgoro) is a province in the autonomous island region of Sardinia in Italy. Its capital is the town of Nuoro.

As of 2026, it has a population of 142,241 and an area of 3,990.47 square kilometres (1,540.73 mi^{2}) across its 53 municipalities, the largest of which are Nuoro (32,718 inhabitants), Siniscola (11,139) and Macomer (8,948).

== History ==
The province was established in 1927. In 2005, the territory of the province of Nuoro was substantially reduced as a consequence of the establishment in the island of four new provinces; subsequent administrative reforms have increased its size once again in 2016, through the annexation of 22 out of the 23 communes which made up the short-lived Ogliastra.

In April 2021, under Sardinian Regional Council's Regional Law Nr. 7, the annexation was reversed, restroring the Ogliastra province and reducing the province of Nuoro back to pre-2016 borders (plus the municipality of Seulo that was previously part of the Province of South Sardinia). Whilst the Italian government challenged the law, thus stalling its implementation, on March 12, 2022, the Constitutional Court ruled in favor of the Autonomous Region of Sardinia. On April 13, 2023, the regional council, at the proposal of the regional government, approved an amendment to the 2021 reform, defining the timeframe and manner of its implementation, which would see its full implementation in 2024.

Parks located in the province include the National Park of the Gulf of Orosei and Gennargentu.

== Government ==
=== Municipalities ===
The province has 53 municipalities:

- Aritzo
- Atzara
- Austis
- Belvì
- Birori
- Bitti
- Bolotana
- Borore
- Bortigali
- Desulo
- Dorgali
- Dualchi
- Fonni
- Gadoni
- Galtellì
- Gavoi
- Irgoli
- Lei
- Loculi
- Lodè
- Lodine
- Lula
- Macomer
- Mamoiada
- Meana Sardo
- Noragugume
- Nuoro
- Oliena
- Ollolai
- Olzai
- Onanì
- Onifai
- Oniferi
- Orani
- Orgosolo
- Orosei
- Orotelli
- Ortueri
- Orune
- Osidda
- Ottana
- Ovodda
- Posada
- Sarule
- Seulo
- Silanus
- Sindia
- Siniscola
- Sorgono
- Teti
- Tiana
- Tonara
- Torpè

== Demographics ==
As of 2026, the population is 142,241, of which 49.5% are male, and 50.5% are female. Minors make up 12.4% of the population, and seniors make up 28.9%.

The province is known for its purported high concentration of centenarians and supercentenarians. From 5 March 2001 to 3 January 2002, Antonio Todde, from Tiana, was the oldest man in the world. It is also one of the so-called blue zones.

Historical population

Year	Pop.	±%
1861	80,215	—
1871	84,067	+4.8%
1881	88,646	+5.4%
1901	103,069	+16.3%
1911	110,289	+7.0%
1921	113,338	+2.8%
1931	121,817	+7.5%
1936	129,442	+6.3%

Year	Pop.	±%
1951	150,005	+15.9%
1961	167,305	+11.5%
1971	162,903	−2.6%
1981	170,439	+4.6%
1991	170,029	−0.2%
2001	165,283	−2.8%
2011	160,094	−3.1%
2021	147,520	−7.9%

Source: ISTAT

=== Immigration ===
As of 2025, the foreign-born population is 7,257, making up 5.1% of the total population.
