= Monte Corrasi =

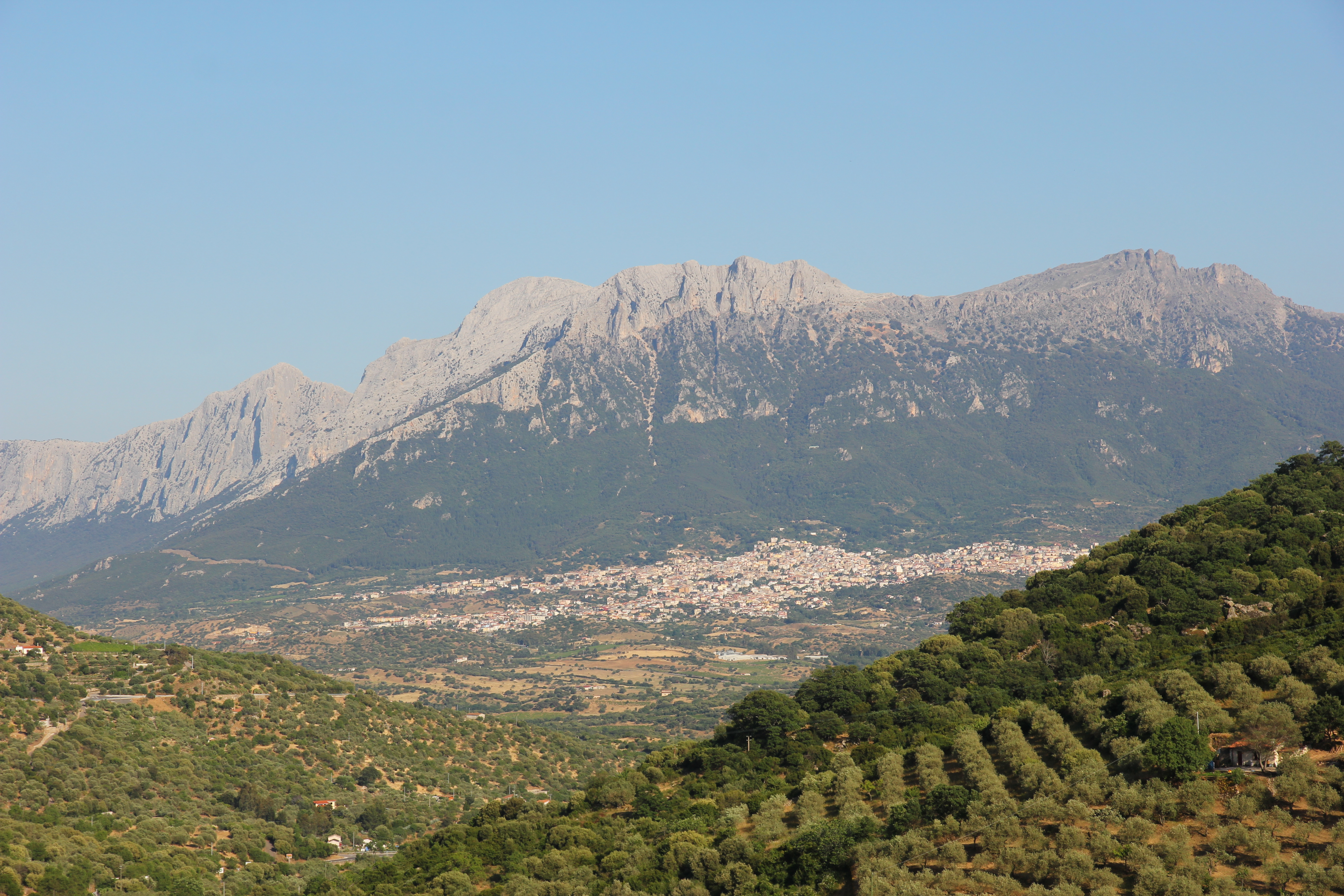
- Monte Corrasi as seen from Oliena

Highest point
- Elevation: 1,463 m (4,800 ft)
- Prominence: 453 m (1,486 ft)
- Isolation: 22.86 km (14.20 mi)
- Listing: List of mountains in Sardinia
- Coordinates: 40°16′N 9°28′E

Geography
- Location within Sardinia
- Location: Province of Nuoro, Sardinia, Italy
- Parent range: Supramonte

Monte Corrasi is a prominent massif located in the territory of Oliena, in central-eastern Sardinia, Italy. It is part of the Supramonte plateau complex. The highest peak, Punta Corrasi, reaches an elevation of 1,463 metres (4,800 ft), making it the highest point of the Supramonte range. The massif is characterized by its striking limestone formations, deep valleys, and rich biodiversity, making it a popular destination for hiking and rock climbing.

== Geography and Topography ==
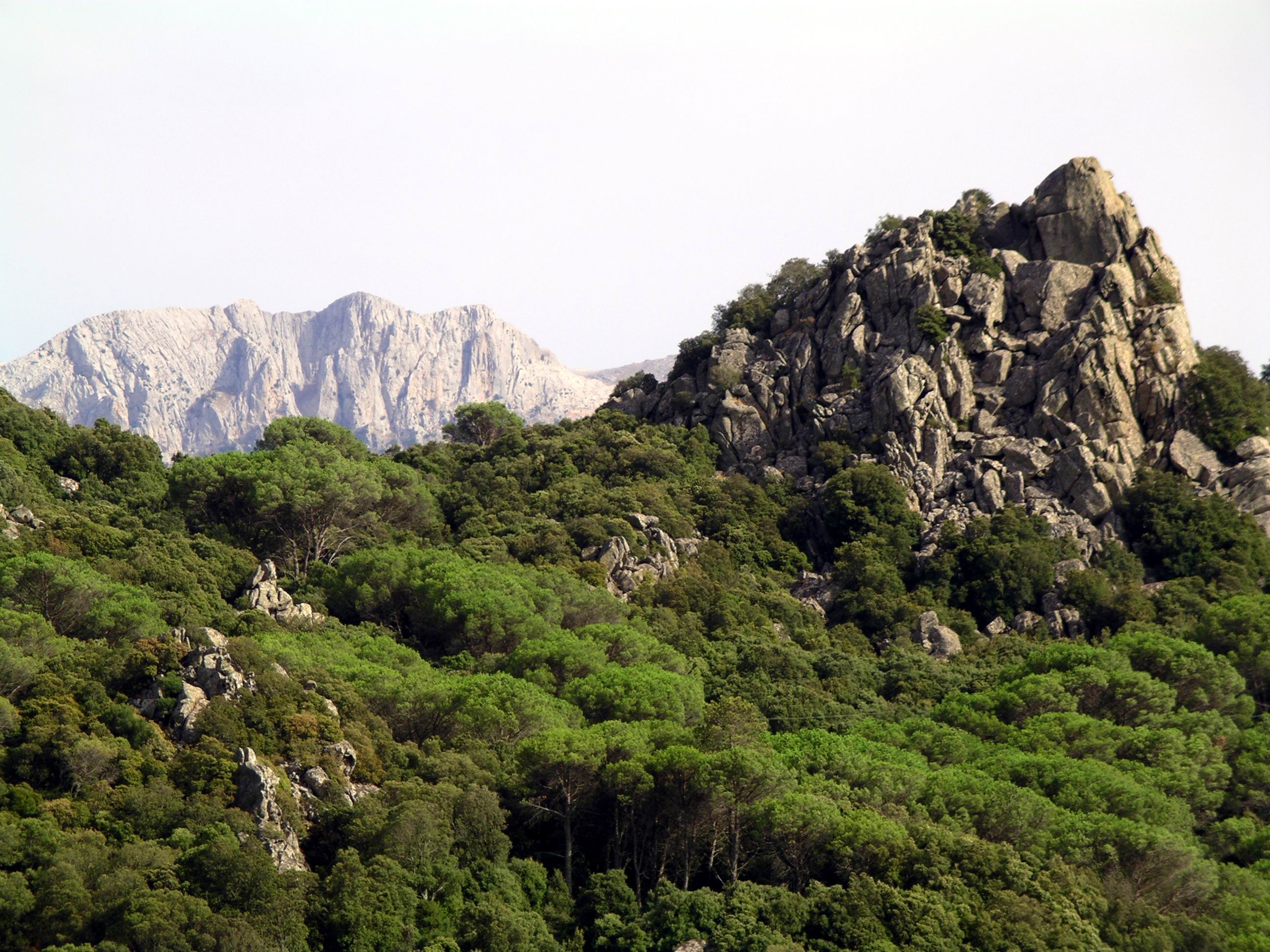
View of Monte Corrasi from Mount Ortobene

The Monte Corrasi massif includes several notable peaks alongside Punta Corrasi. These include Punta Sos Nidos (1,348 m), Punta Ortu Camminu (1,331 m), Punta Carabidda (1,321 m), Punta Cusidore (1,147 m), Punta Preda 'e Mugrones (1,138 m), Fruncu Nigheddu (981 m), and Monte Uddè (910 m). Strictly speaking, the toponym "Monte Corrasi" refers specifically to the highest peak of this limestone complex.

At the foot of the mountain lie the valleys of Lanaìtho, Guthiddài, and Oddoène. The Lanaìtho valley is particularly notable for containing the Nuragic village of Tiscali and the caves of Sa 'Ohe, Su Ventu, and Corbeddu. The area also features the prominent karst spring of Su Gologone.

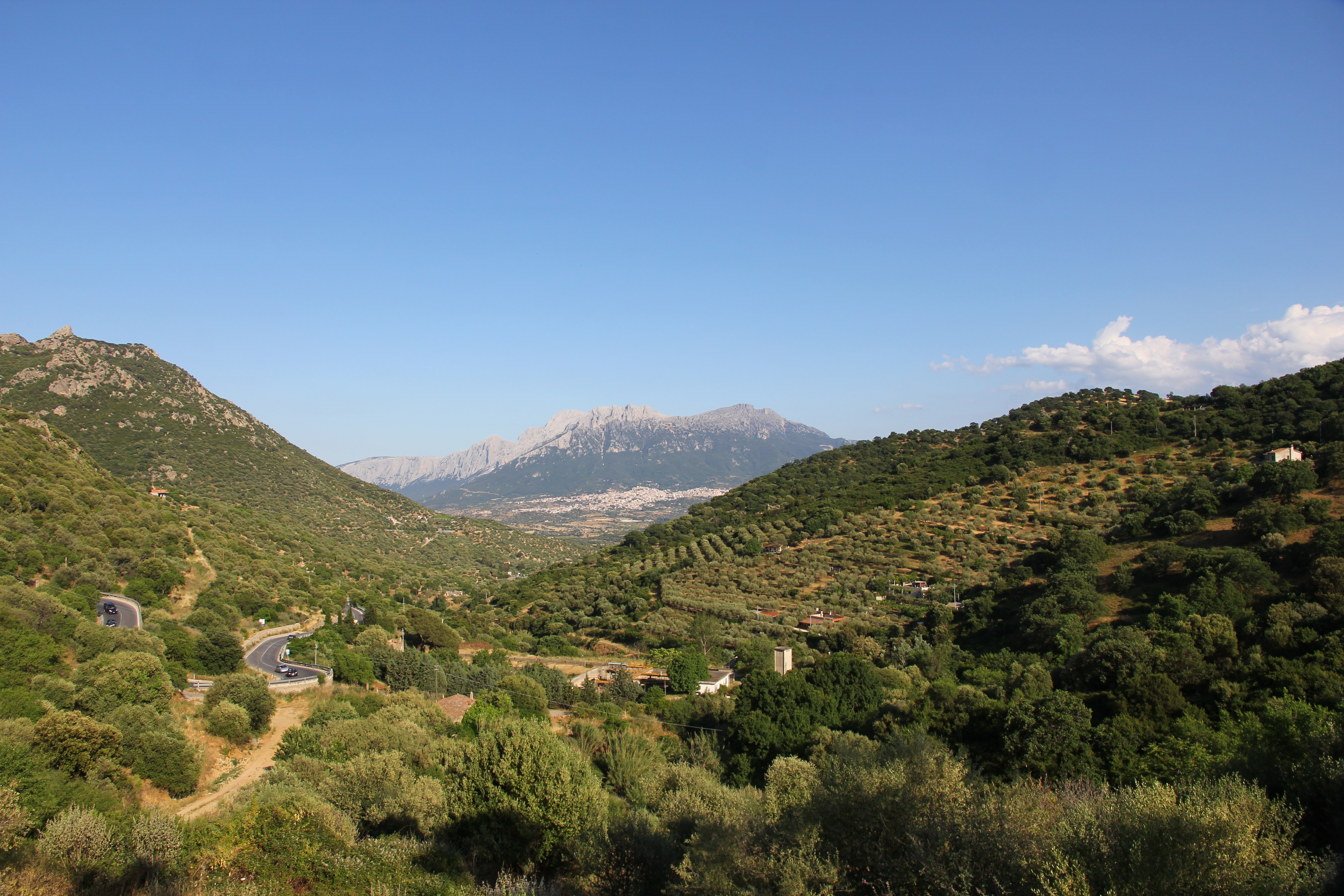
Monte Corrasi landscape showing the valleys of Lanaìtho

The slopes of Monte Corrasi give rise to various tributaries of the Cedrino river. These streams form a small natural basin connected to the Iriài artificial reservoir, commonly known as Cedrino Lake. Additionally, the mountain contains several internal karst lakes.

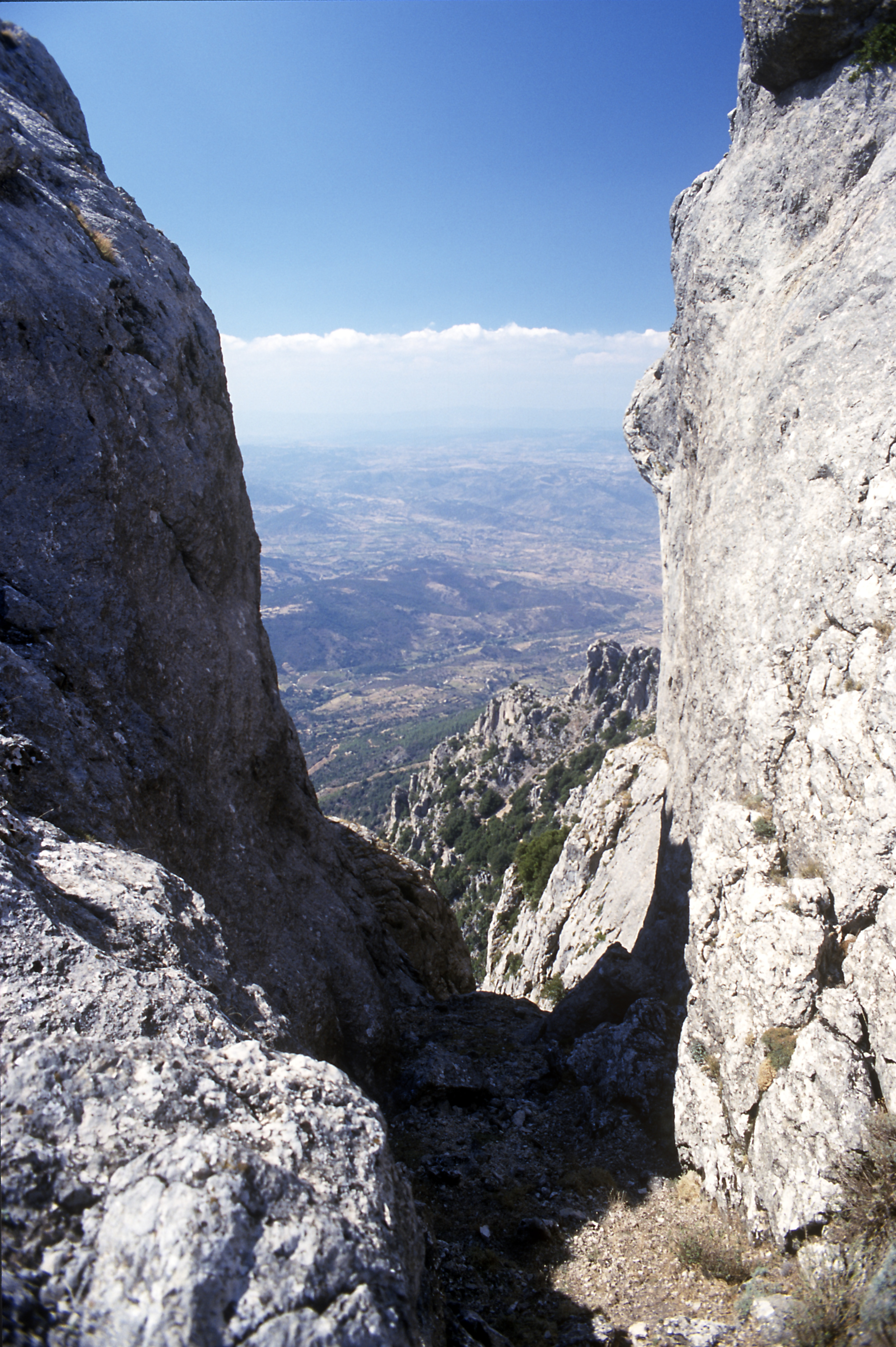
A mountain pass on the massif

The mountain features several mountain passes and saddles that provide access to different areas of the massif.

== Geology and Landscape ==
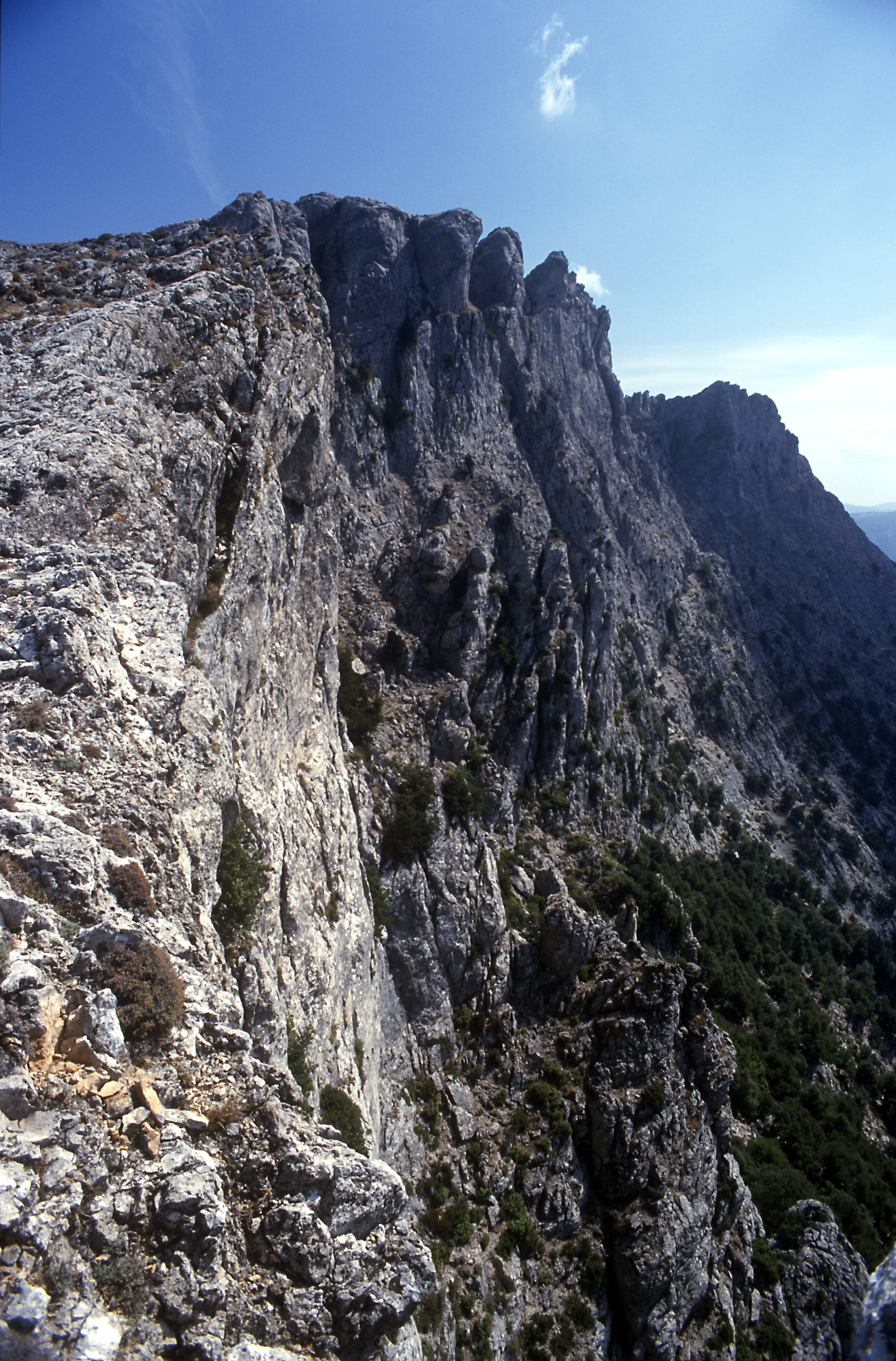
Steep cliffs of Monte Corrasi

As a destination for hikers and climbers, Monte Corrasi is renowned for its dramatic karst landscape. It features striking overhanging cliffs, the most famous being those of Badde Pentumas, alongside numerous caves, towering pinnacles (such as the Giuglìa group), wide plateaus, hidden chasms, dolines, and dense, inaccessible forests. "Monte Corrasi represents a true paradise in the heart of Barbagia, characterized by imposing limestone walls that have always challenged climbers," noted journalist Elio Aste in 1974.

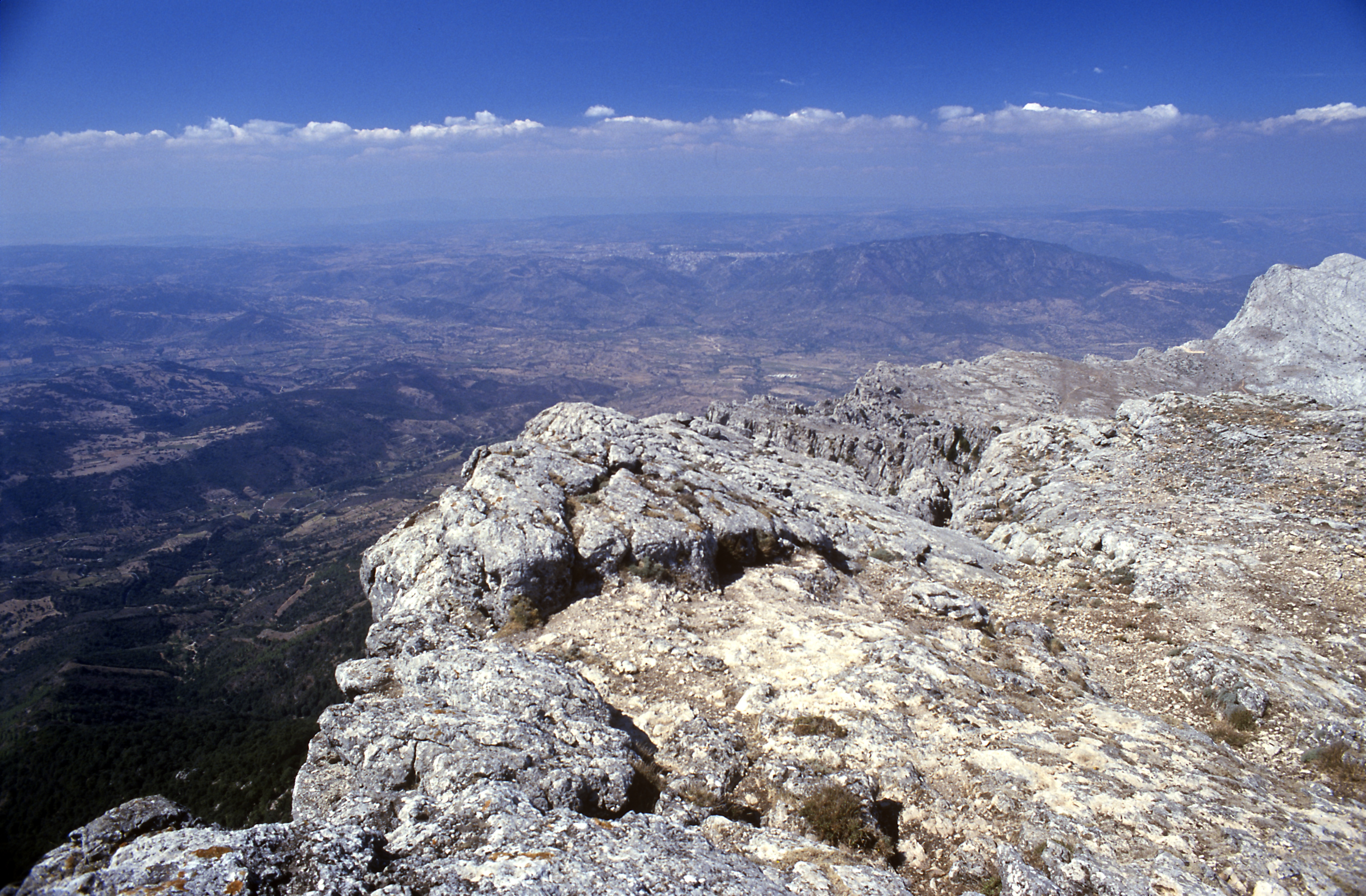
View towards Orgosolo from Monte Corrasi

The limestone formations create a unique landscape that extends towards the neighboring areas, including views towards Orgosolo.

== Climate ==
The climate of Monte Corrasi varies significantly with altitude. At higher elevations, it exhibits a continental climate, transitioning to a cold Mediterranean climate on its lower slopes. The environment becomes more humid, temperate, and sheltered from the wind as elevation decreases. Precipitation is frequent throughout the year, including snowfall. Early snowfalls often occur in October and November, and during the coldest winter months, temperatures frequently drop well below freezing.

== Flora and Fauna ==
The area is of considerable ecological importance. The presence of a wide variety of botanical species—numbering approximately 650, including numerous endemic species—prompted the Italian Botanical Society in the 1970s to include the mountain in the Census of sites of significant vegetational interest worthy of conservation in Italy. "The botanical richness of the massif is of extraordinary value, hosting numerous endemic species that find refuge in its unique microclimates," according to a comprehensive study on Sardinia's natural environment.

The fauna is equally diverse. Notable resident bird species include the golden eagle, common buzzard, peregrine falcon, and Eleonora's falcon. The mouflon is also present in the area. Historically, the massif was home to the Sardinian deer, fallow deer, cinereous vulture, bearded vulture, griffon vulture, and Bonelli's eagle, all of which are now locally extinct or critically endangered in this region.

== Recreation ==
Monte Corrasi is a popular destination for hiking and rock climbing. For visitors, the Rifugio Ostello di Monte Maccione, a mountain hut and hostel, is located at an altitude of 600 metres (2,000 ft), serving as a base for excursions into the massif.

== See also ==
- Supramonte
- List of mountains in Sardinia
- Gennargentu
