= Badde Pentumas =

Dry limestone canyon in Sardinia, Italy

Coordinates: 40.249°N 9.476°E

Badde Pentumas is a dry limestone canyon in the Supramonte di Oliena, in the municipality of Oliena, Province of Nuoro, Sardinia, Italy. The gorge is part of the karst landscape of the Oliena area, associated with the Monte Corrasi massif and the Lanaitto valley.

== Geography ==
Badde Pentumas is situated in the Supramonte di Oliena, an area known for its limestone formations and karst features. The Sardegna Digital Library describes the gorge as a very deep and completely dry limestone canyon located behind Monte Cusidore.

The wider Supramonte landscape is characterised by plateaus, sinkholes, deep canyons and rocky peaks. The Supramonte extends across the territories of several municipalities, including Oliena, and includes Monte Corrasi, the highest peak of the mountain range at 1,463 metres.

== Recognition and local listing ==
The regional local-authority portal Sardegna Autonomie lists Canyon Badde Pentumas among the special areas and areas of interest of the municipality of Oliena.

== Recreation ==
Badde Pentumas is known in outdoor literature as a canyoning and via ferrata area. A SardegnaTurismo climbing and canyoning guide lists Badde Pentumas among the dry canyons of Sardinia. PlanetMountain describes Badde Pentumas as a gorge in the Oliena Supramonte massif, in the Lanaitto Valley, and notes its use for canyoning and, more recently, via ferrata activity.

The gorge is also described by Italian via ferrata sources as a scenic canyon in the territory of Oliena.

== See also ==
- Monte Corrasi
- Oliena
- Supramonte
- Su Gorroppu
