= Giovanni Corbeddu Salis =

Sardinian outlaw

Giovanni Corbeddu Salis (Oliena, c. 1844 – Riu Monte (Orgosolo), September 3, 1898) was a Sardinian outlaw.

Nicknamed Il Re della macchia ("The King of the bush") for the authority conferred on him by other criminals, he was a bandit who rampaged in Barbagia, in the center of Sardinia.

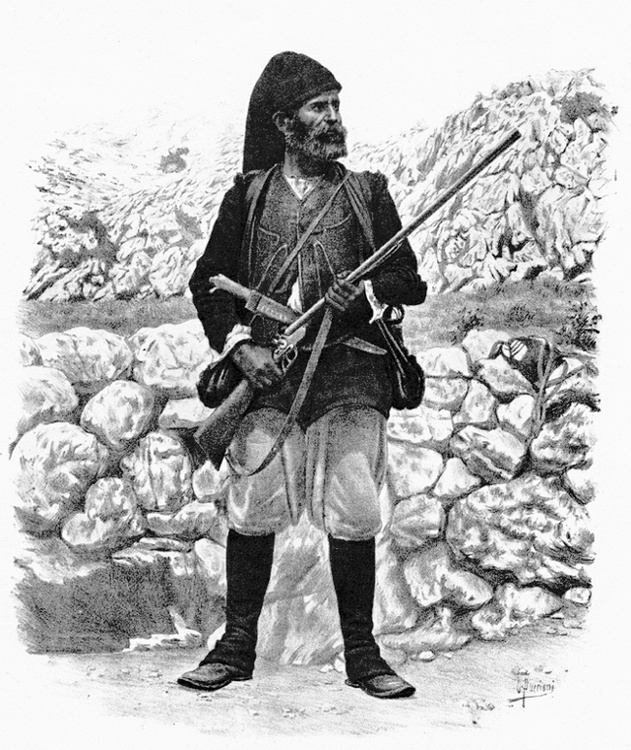
Giovanni Corbeddu Salis, 1894

== Biography ==
Corbeddu went into hiding in 1880 after being accused (perhaps falsely) of rustling.

After a long series of crimes (among others the attack of the diligence Nuoro-Macomer), he took refuge in a cave in the Supramonte of Oliena (the cave is now named for him Corbeddu Cave).

In that place, abandoning any criminal activity, he began to play the role of peacemaker and arbitrator in disputes and was reputedly possessed of wisdom.

In 1894 Corbeddu collaborated with the authorities as a mediator for the release of two French timber merchants, Louis Paty and Regis Proll, who had been kidnapped in the territory between Seulo and Aritzo. He refused the monetary reward.

Then, he was given ten days leave so that he could return to Oliena and walk round the village unhindered.

In 1898 he was surrounded by the carabinieri on the mountains of Orgosolo together with another fugitive, Antonio Congiu, and a shepherd boy of fifteen years. While trying to escape encirclement he was shot and killed by the sharpshooter Aventino Moretti with a shot in the back.

With him, the fifteen-year-old shepherd was killed while Congiu escaped.

The absconding of Corbeddu lasted eighteen years.

== The Robin Hood of Sardinia ==
Louis Van Gasteren reports that one day Corbeddu met a man who was working hard late at night and asked him why. The man replied that he had to work to keep his many children and feed them. Corbeddu gave some money to that man that was enough to feed his family that evening and the following day.

Van Gasteren reports that he stole from the rich to give to the poor and that he kept nothing for himself.

== Bibliography ==
- Giulio Bechi, Caccia grossa, 1900.
- Angelo De Murtas, La Nuova Sardegna, 100 anni della nostra storia voll. 1 e 2, 1991.

== Filmography ==
- Louis Van Gasteren, Corbeddu, 1975

== See also ==
- Sardinian banditry
