= La Marmora =

La Marmora may refer to:

- Punta La Marmora, a Sardinian mountain
- Alfonso Ferrero La Marmora (1804-1878), Italian general and statesman
- Alessandro Ferrero La Marmora (1799-1855), Italian general
