= Nuragic complex of sa Sedda 'e sos Carros =

Archeological site

Sa Sedda 'e Sos Carros
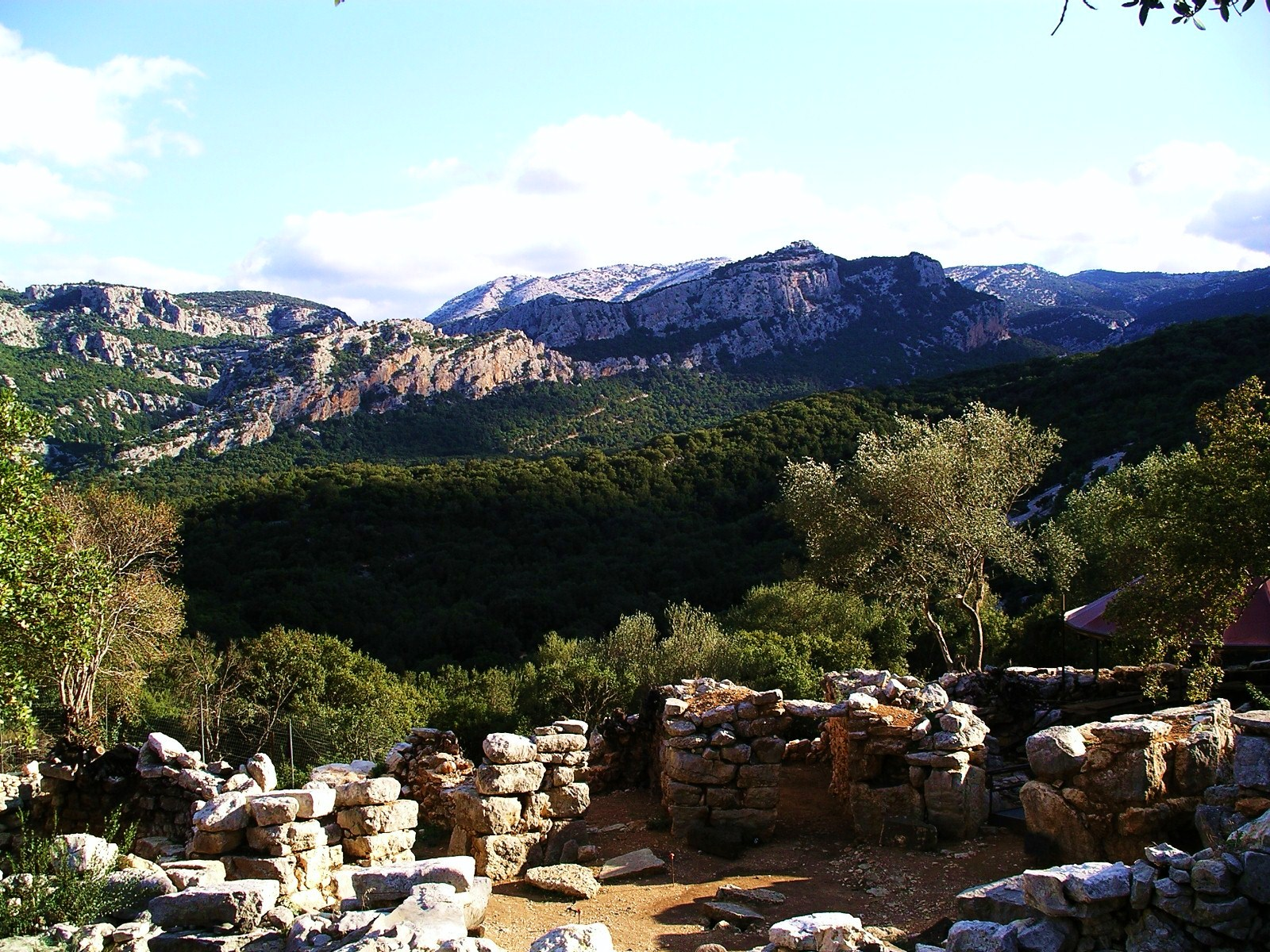
- Interactive map of Sa Sedda 'e Sos Carros
- Type: Village
- Periods: Bronze Age, Iron Age
- Cultures: Nuragic civilization
- Location: Oliena, Sardinia, Italy

The Nuragic complex of sa Sedda 'e sos Carros is an archaeological site located in the territory of Oliena, in the Lanaittu Valley, in the province of Nuoro.

The name in Sardinian language means "the passing point of the wagons".

== Archaeology ==
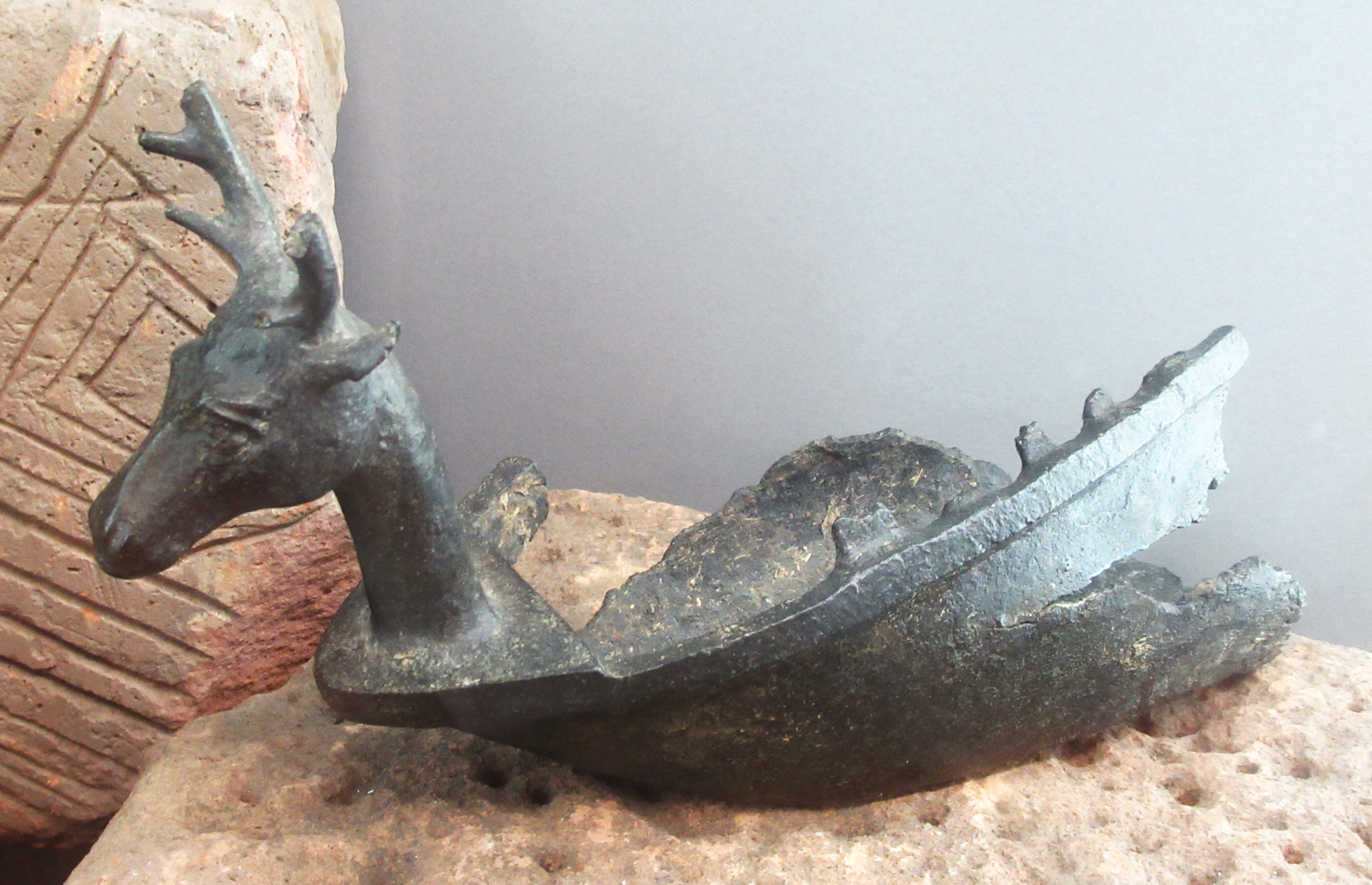
Bronze ship model from the site

The site, which counts numerous huts, dates back to the late Bronze Age and early Iron Age, and is of particular importance because of the melting slides that witness major metallurgical activities. Of great importance is the presence of a roundhouse with basin, one of the best preserved of nuragic Sardinia. The structure is a fountain which worked through a hydraulic implant. Water arrived through the mouth of ram shaped protomes into the central basin thanks to a water raceway and lead pipes coming out of the protomes.

The site was also a metallurgical center provided with a foundry; iron slags were in fact recovered during archaeological excavations.

== Gallery ==
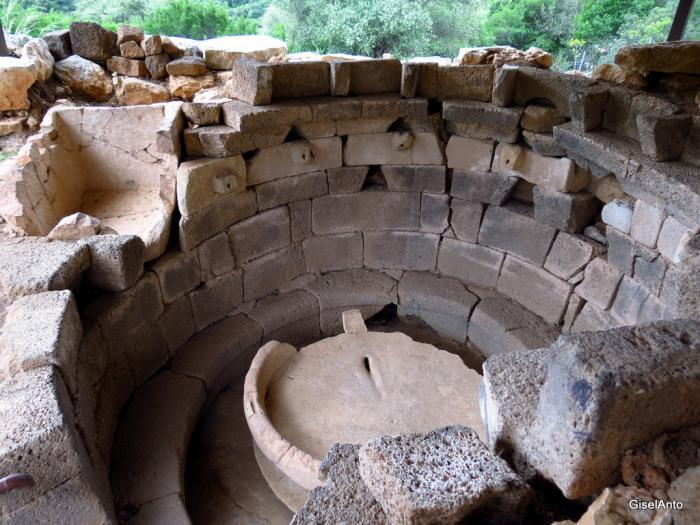
The fountain
