= Bruncu Spina =

Mountain in Sardinia, Italy

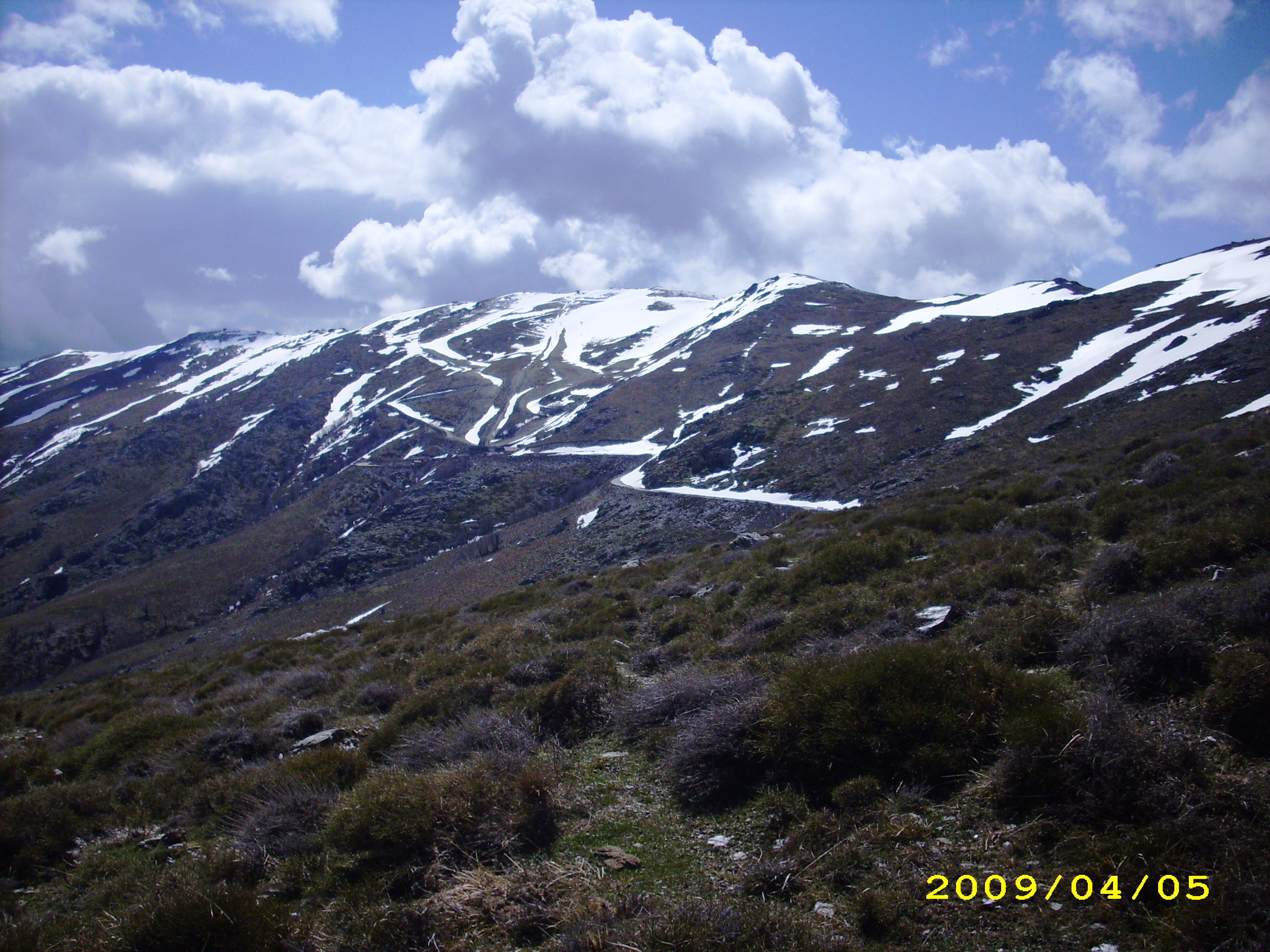

Highest point
- Elevation: 1,829 m (6,001 ft)
- Prominence: 178 m (584 ft)
- Isolation: 366 km (227 mi)
- Coordinates: 40°00′57″N 9°18′14″E

Geography
- Location within Italy
- Location: Sardinia, Province of Nuoro
- Country: Italy
- Parent range: Gennargentu

Bruncu Spina, with its 1,829 meters is the second highest peak in Sardinia after Punta La Marmora. It is located in the Gennargentu massif, in the province of Nuoro, in the administrative territory of the municipalities of Villagrande Strisaili and Desulo. The territorial portion in the head of the municipality of Villagrande Strisaili was granted in perpetual emphyteusis to the municipality of Fonni.

On the top of the mountain there was an astronomical observatory, currently reduced to the state of ruins.

== Description ==
=== Origin and meaning of the name ===
The toponym in Sardinian can be translated as "summit of the thistle." This name can be attributed to the presence on the mountain of herbaceous species belonging to the Asteraceae family. According to others (Massimo Pittau - Toponyms of Southern Sardinia) the toponym means "summit of the thorn" and refers to the Prunus prostrata that grows there.

=== Climate ===
Precipitation is concentrated in the autumn, winter and spring months. Frequent snowfall occurs during the winter season, with more than two meters of snowfall each year and snowfields of several meters accumulating in some places due to winds (snowfields last until May/June). January and February are the months when the heaviest snowfall occurs, with heavy snowfall also occurring in March (01/03/2016, 70 cm of snow) and April.

=== Flora and fauna ===
From a floristic-vegetational point of view, the mountain slopes are covered with low scrubland formations that are the result of the processes of degradation of the original vegetation due to overgrazing and the indiscriminate use of fire as a means of obtaining new areas useful for livestock farming. Holm oak (Quercus ilex) woodland formations can be found at altitudes below 1,400 meters while downy oak (Quercus pubescens) is found in small, sparse, isolated groups in association with cade juniper (Juniperus oxycedrus). At higher altitudes, shrub species that assume a creeping habit due to the unfavorable climatic conditions are found. The most commonly represented species are tree heath (Erica arborea), Corsican broom (Genista corsica), dwarf juniper (Juniperus nana), caraway thyme (Thymus herba-barona), and greater barberry (Santolina insularis). In the valleys, stream banks are characterized by gallery forests formed by black alder (Alnus glutinosa). The presence of the rare Lamyropsis microcephala, a species endemic to Sardinia, is also noted. It grows on the slopes of Bruncu Spina, in an estimated range of about 100 m^{2}.

The fauna is represented by birds such as the golden eagle (Aquila chrysaetos), Bonelli's eagle (Hieraaetus fasciatus), red kite (Milvus milvus) and griffon vulture (Gyps fulvus). Mammals, on the other hand, are represented by wild boar (Sus scrofa), fox (Vulpes vulpes ichnusae), marten (Martes martes) and Sardinian wildcat (Felis lybica sarda).

=== Ski ===
Skiing is possible on the slopes of the mountain. Along the side of Fonni (Separadorgiu) there is a ski lift, while on the side of Desulo (s'Arena) there is a 300-meter long moving walkway. The ski season normally lasts 2–3 months (December to March) and attracts several thousand people.

=== Hiking ===
The summit of Bruncu Spina can be reached by following several hiking trails, maintained by the Forestry Authority of Sardinia. Along the way there are several viewpoints and areas with facilities for resting. The paths through which the summit can be reached are:

- Gennargentu T-721 - Following this trail is possible as far as Punta La Marmora, following the Grand Italian Trail with which it intersects. There are rest stops and refreshment points along the trail, as well as a mountain hut. The length of the trail is 5.3 km with an elevation gain of 149 meters, which can be covered in an average of one and a half hours;
- Arcu Artilai - Bruncu Spina T-721A - The trail leads to Bruncu Spina, up to an altitude of 1829 meters, taking a detour along Gennargentu trail T-721. It runs for about 800 meters, with an elevation gain of 168 meters, which can be covered in about thirty minutes. There are rest stops, refreshment points and a mountain hut along the way;

== See also ==
- Gennargentu
- Villagrande Strisaili
- Desulo
- Bruncu Spina ski area

== Bibliography ==
- Ignazio Camarda; Andrea Cossu, eds. (1988). "Capitolo 11. Area culminale del Gennargentu" (PDF). Biotopi di Sardegna. Guida a dodici aree di rilevante interesse botanico. Sassari: Carlo Delfino Editore. pp. 267–286.
- Ignazio Camarda, ed. (1993). Montagne di Sardegna. Sassari: Carlo Delfino.
- Morandini, Mirta; Salvatore Cuccuru (1999). "I monti del Gennargentu". Cascate e gole in Sardegna (PDF). Cagliari: GEOS. Archived from the original (PDF) on March 5, 2012.
