= Su Gologone =

Spring in Sardinia

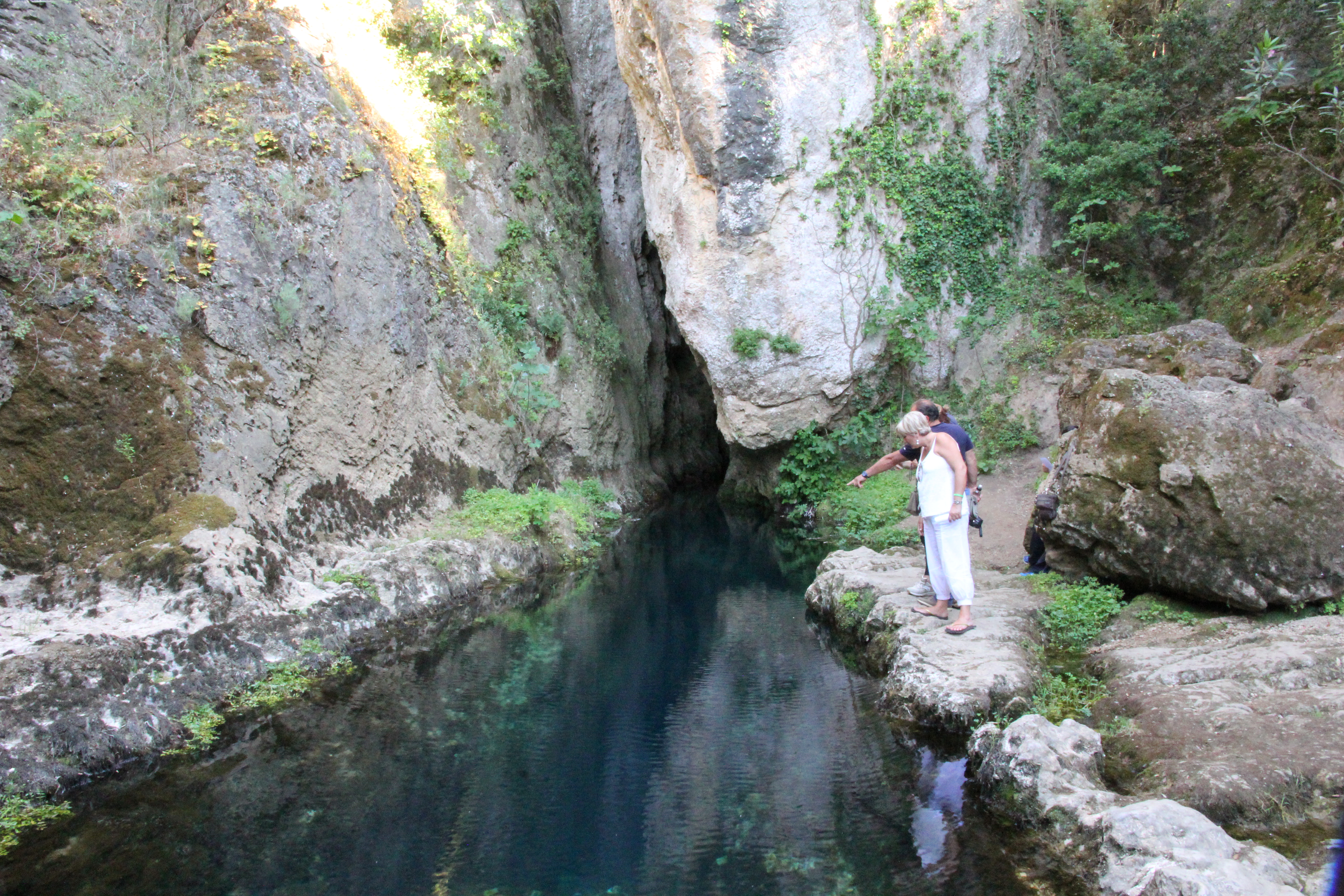
- Interactive map of Su Gologone
- Location: Oliena, Sardinia, Italy
- Coordinates: 40°17′20″N 9°29′47″E
- Type: Karst spring

Su Gologone is a karst spring in the Supramonte range northeast of Oliena, in the province of Nuoro, Sardinia, Italy.

From the source in Oliena, a short stream originates which feeds the Cedrino. The water comes out of a crack in the limestone rock, which goes underground to the depth currently explored by speleologists of 135 m (443 ft). The maximum lean flow rate of the spring was detected as 60 liters per second in 1995 while the full flow rate is estimated at around 8,000 liters. With an average flow rate of 500 liters of water per second, Su Gologone is the most important spring in Sardinia.
