= Gulf of Orosei and Gennargentu National Park =

National park in Sardinia

Parco Nazionale del Golfo di Orosei e del Gennargentu
- IUCN category II (national park)
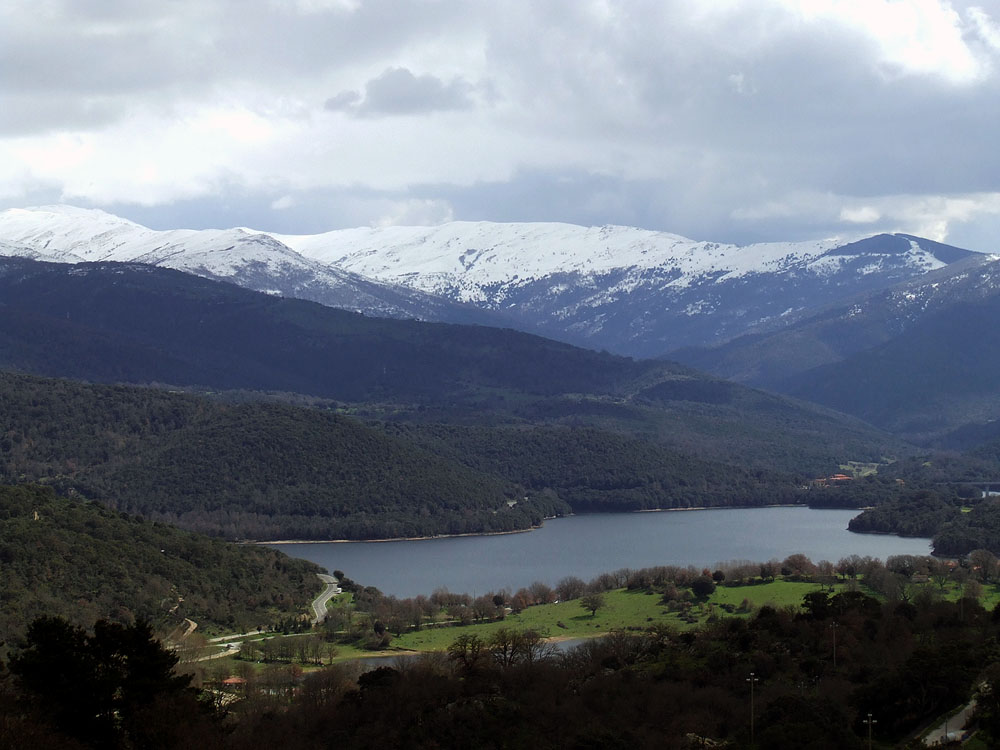
- Gusana Lake in the park

- Location within Italy
- Location: Sardegna
- Nearest city: Nuoro
- Coordinates: 39°59′23″N 9°19′29″E
- Area: 730.00 km^{2} (281.85 sq mi)
- Established: 1998
- Governing body: Ministero dell'Ambiente
- Website: www.parcogennargentu.it/index.htm

The Gennargentu National Park (also National Park of the Bay of Orosei and Gennargentu; Italian: Parco Nazionale del Golfo di Orosei e del Gennargentu) is a national park on the east coast of Sardinia.

Wildlife in the park includes the Felis lybica sarda (also known as Sardinian wildcat), the mouflon, the marten, the weasel, the edible dormouse, the garden dormouse, the Sardinian fox, the griffon vulture, the golden eagle, the Bonelli's eagle, the peregrine falcon, the great spotted woodpecker, the butterfly Corsican swallowtail. Marine mammals include the Mediterranean monk seal, the fin whale, sperm whale, and various smaller whales and dolphins.

The park lies in the provinces of Nuoro and Ogliastra.

The highest mountain in Sardinia, Punta La Marmora, in the Gennargentu mountain range is within the boundaries of the National Park.

== See also ==
- List of national parks of Italy
- Orosei

== Gallery ==
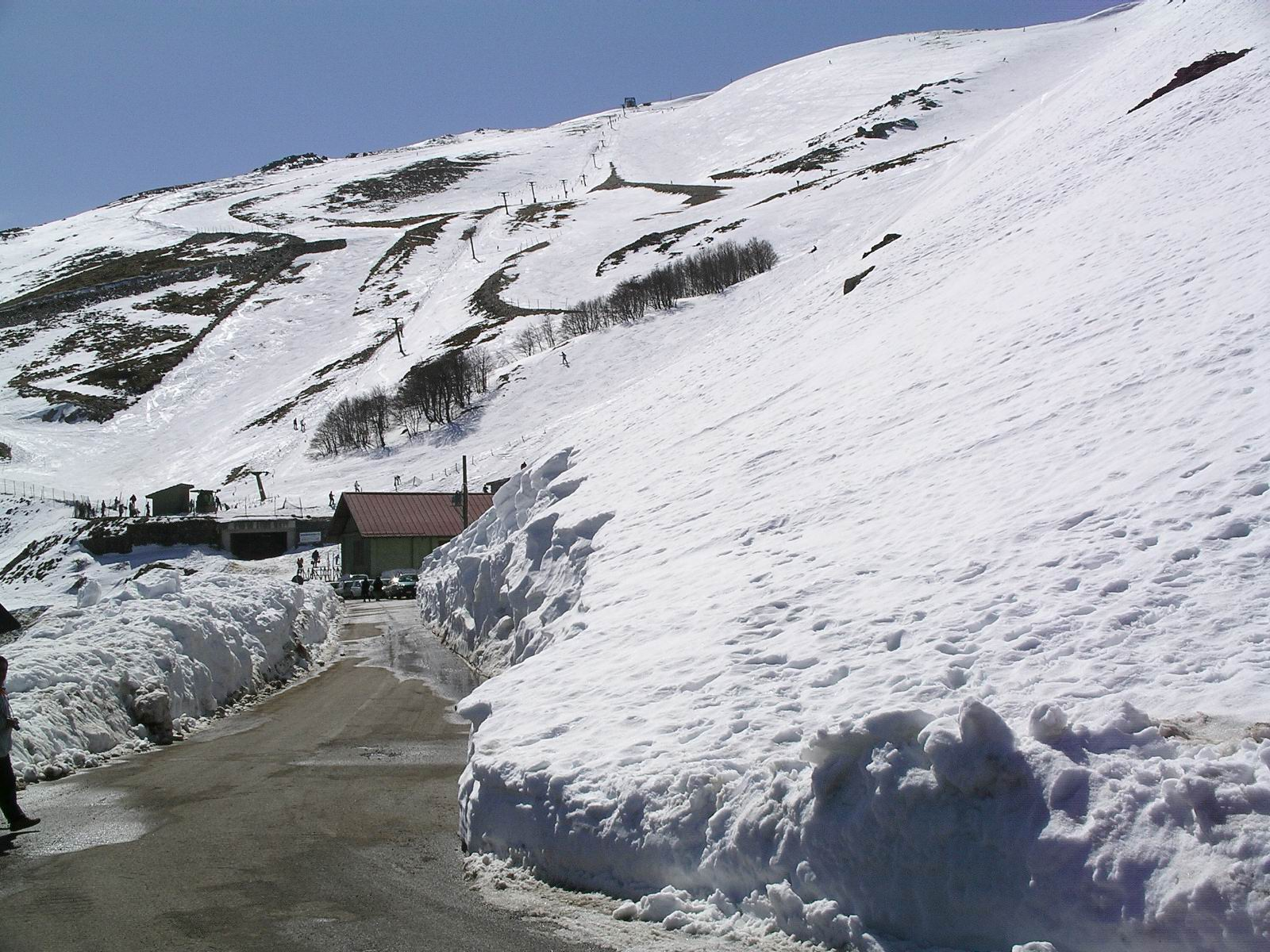
Bruncu Spina's ski resort

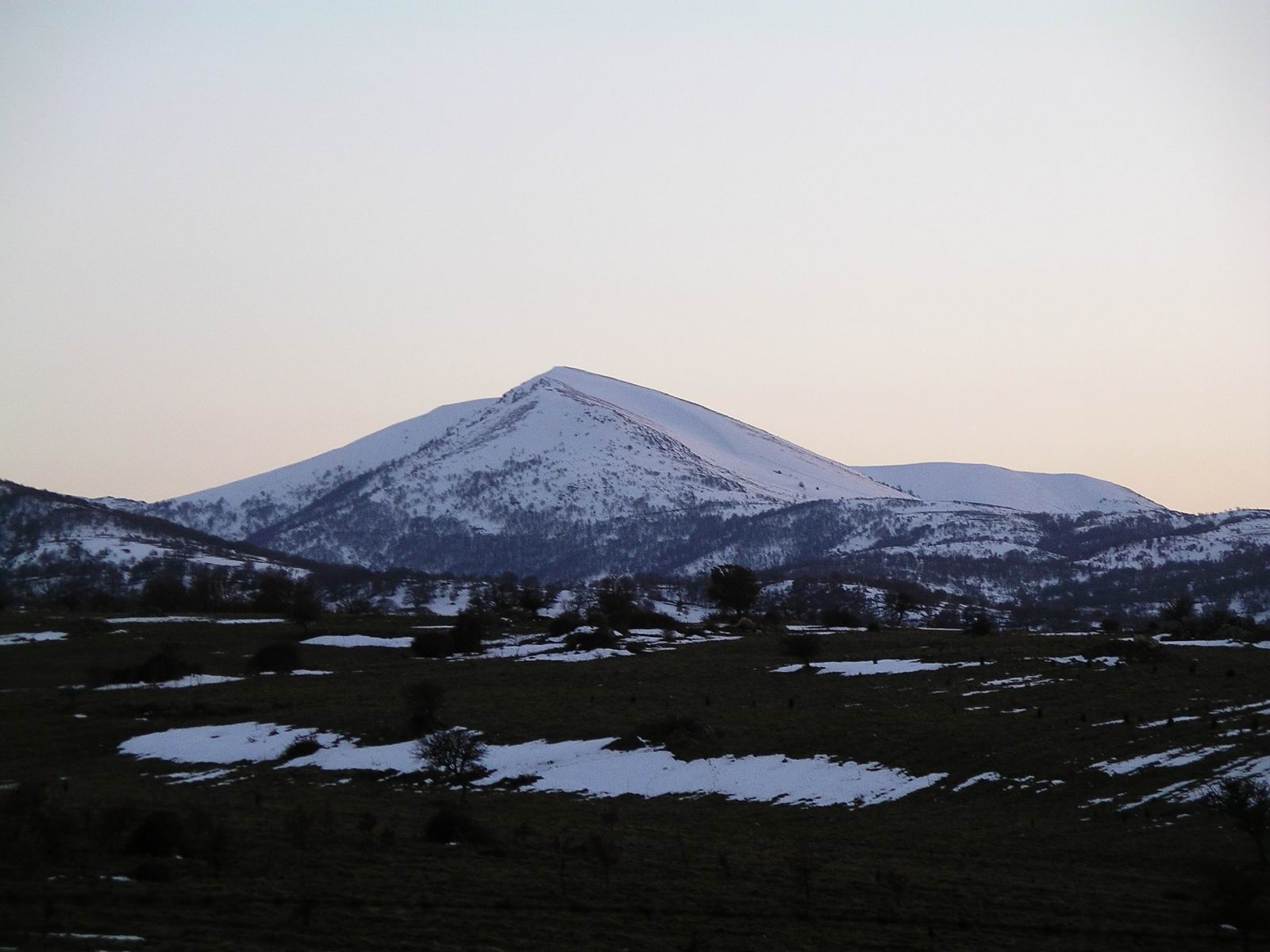
Monte Spada

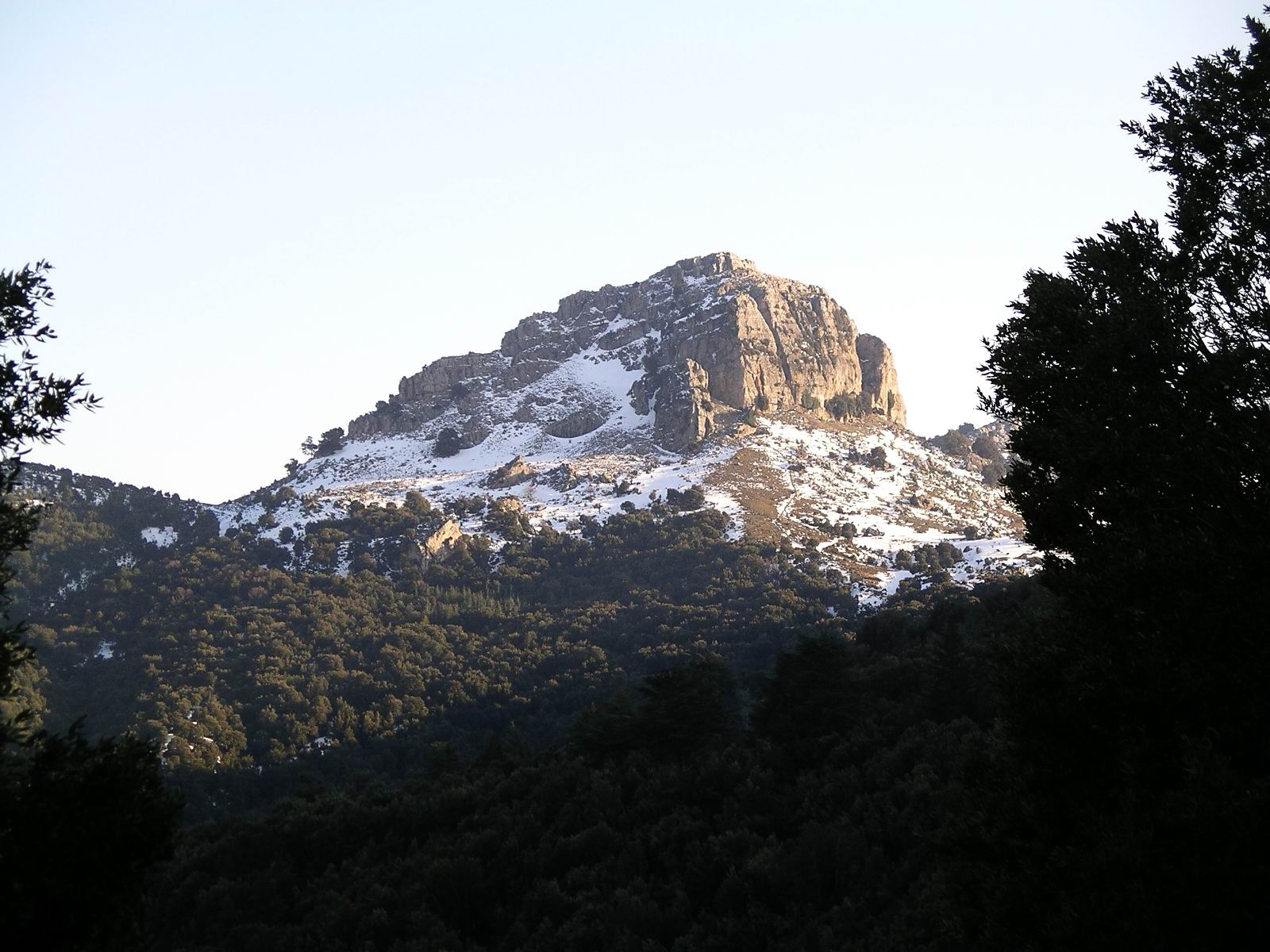
Monte Fumai

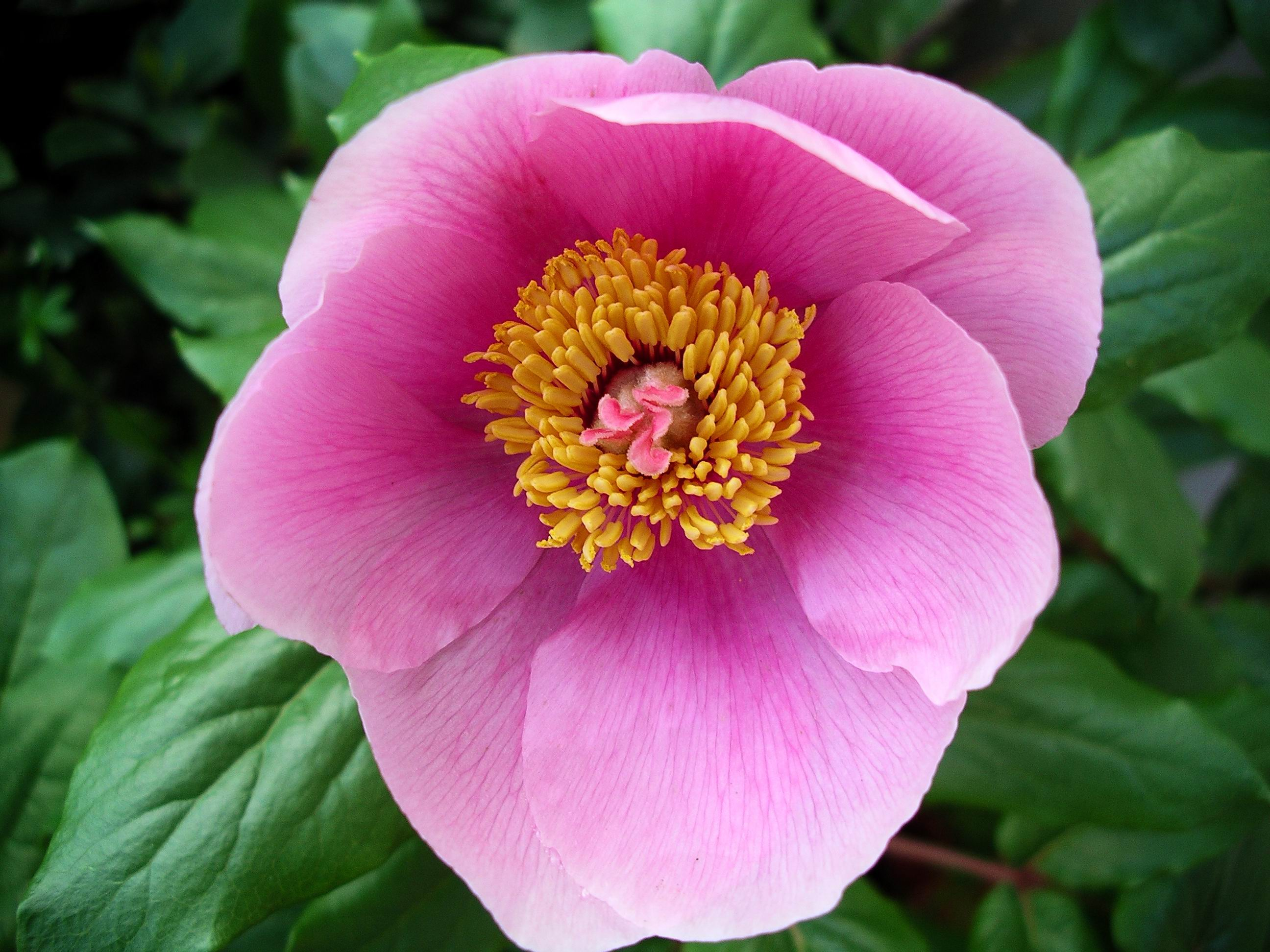
Paeonia of Gennargentu

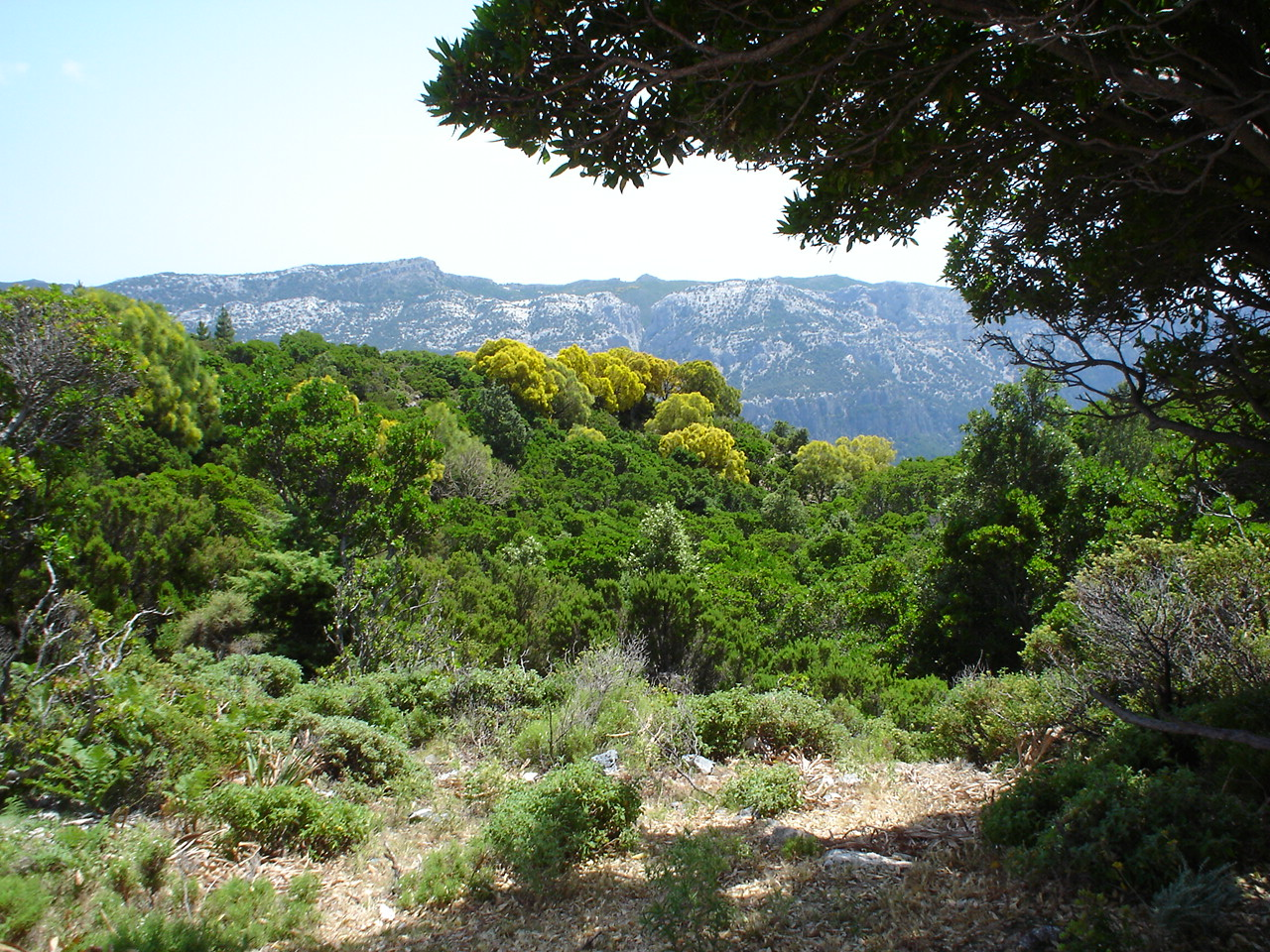
a lush forest

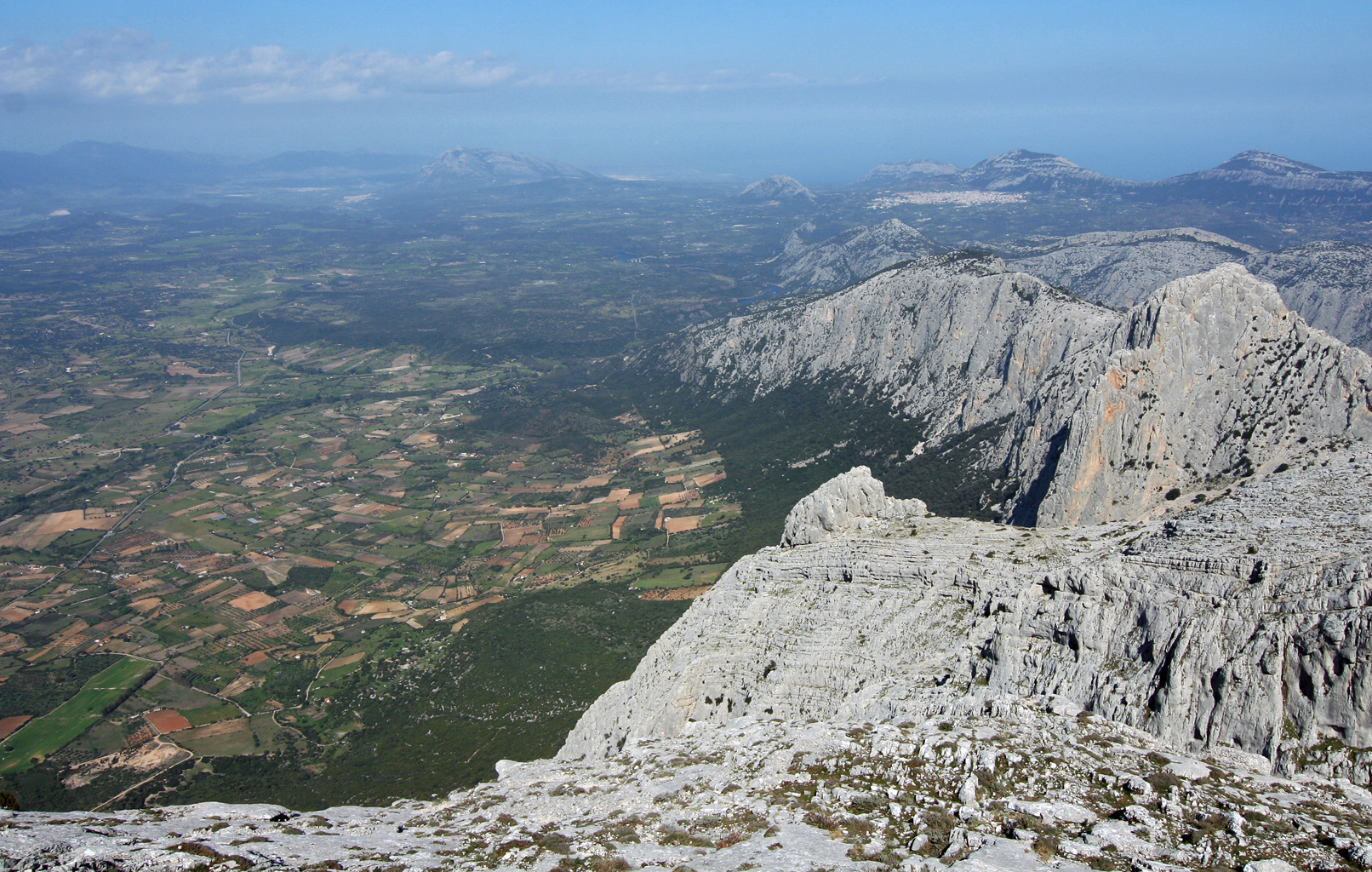
Punta Sos Nidos

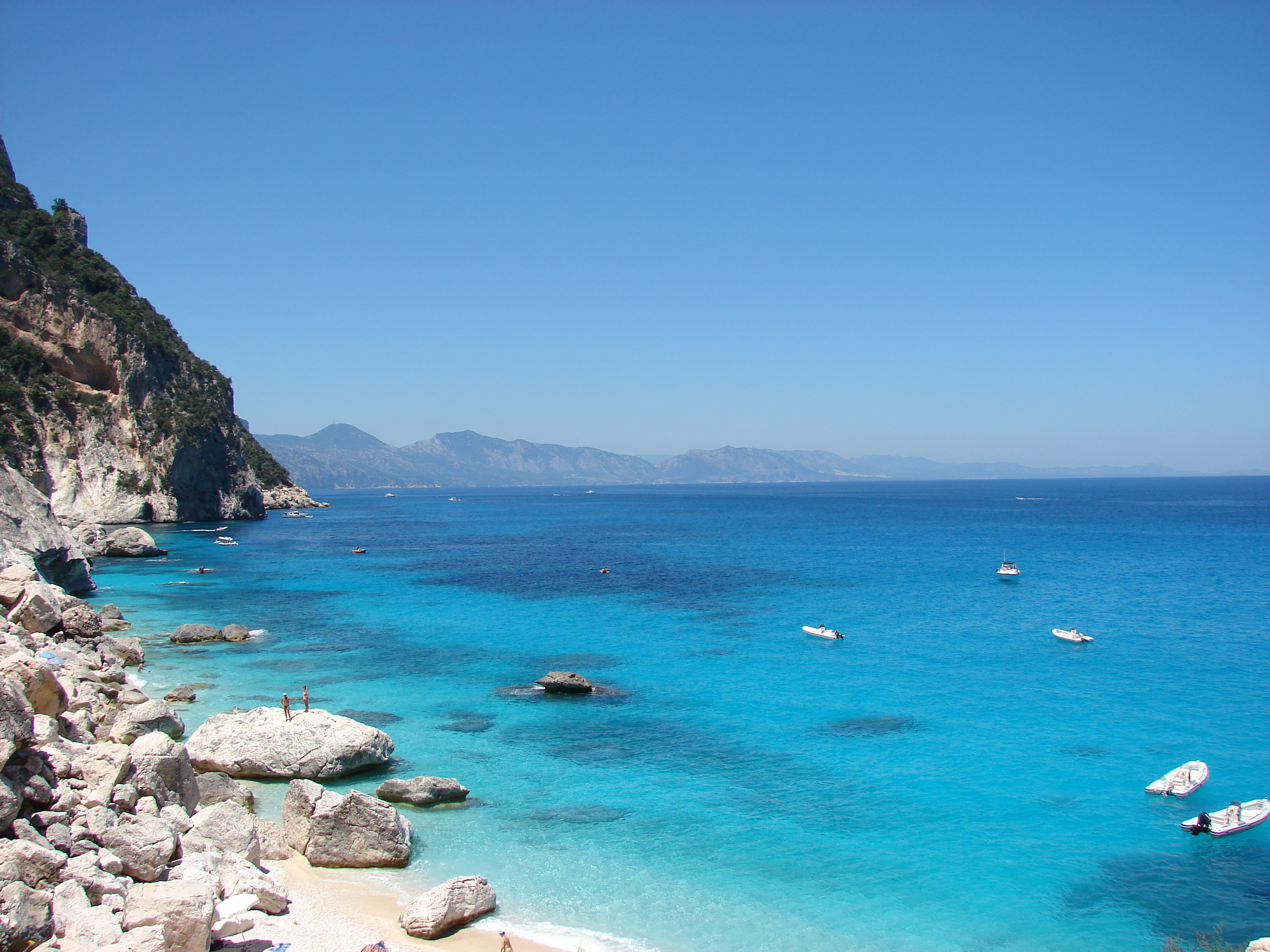
Cala Goloritzé

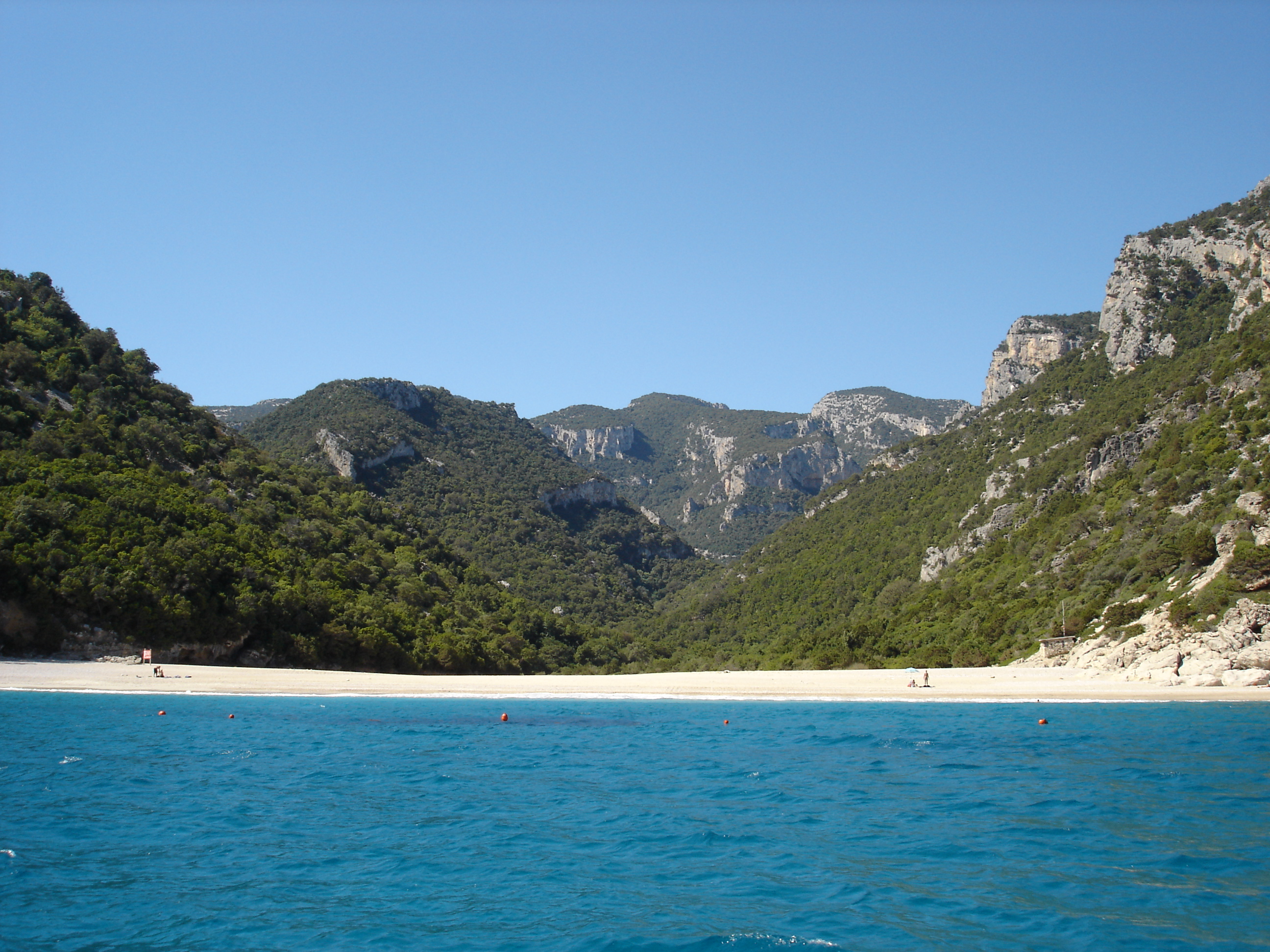
Cala Sisine
