= Corbeddu Cave =

Cave and archaeological site in Italy

Grotta Corbeddu Corbeddu Cave
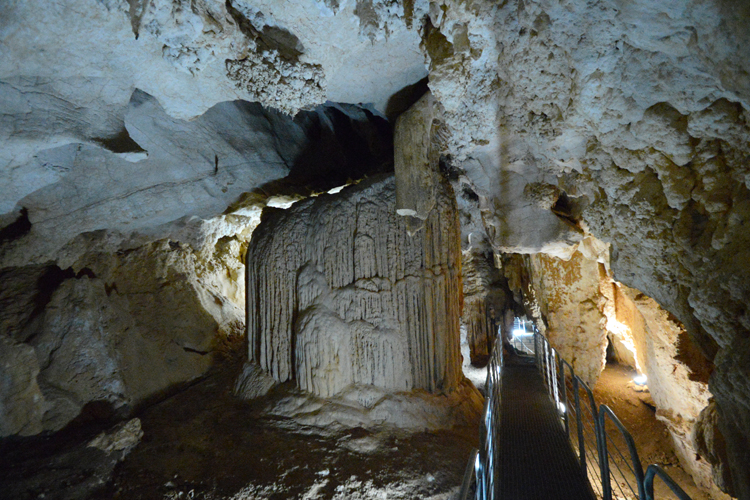
- Inside the cave

- Location within Italy
- Location: Oliena (NU, Sardinia, Italy)
- Coordinates: 40°15′18″N 9°29′06″E

UNESCO World Heritage Site
- Part of: Funerary Tradition in the Prehistory of Sardinia – The domus de janas
- Criteria: Cultural: iii
- Reference: 1730-023
- Inscription: 2025 (47th Session)

The Corbeddu cave is located in the territory of Oliena, municipality of the province of Nuoro, in Sardinia. In this cave found refuge the famous Sardinian bandit Giovanni Corbeddu Salis (1844–1898), from which it took its name.

The cave is about 130 meters long and consists essentially of three "rooms". Inside, important archaeological finds have been made, in particular some human remains, which some authors dated to around 20,000 years ago, which if correct constitutes the oldest evidence of humans on Sardinia. However, this claim has been contested, with others suggesting that there is no solid evidence for the presence of humans on Sardinia-Corsica until the early Mesolithic, around 10,000 years ago.

In addition, bone and stone tools were discovered that were used by these prehistoric people in their daily lives. The cave, as evidenced by further findings, was also inhabited during the Neolithic period. In addition to the human bones in the cave there were numerous bones of extinct endemic animals such as the Sardinian dhole, the deer Praemegaceros cazioti and the lagomorph Prolagus sardus.
