= Alberto della Marmora =

Italian soldier and naturalist (1789–1863)

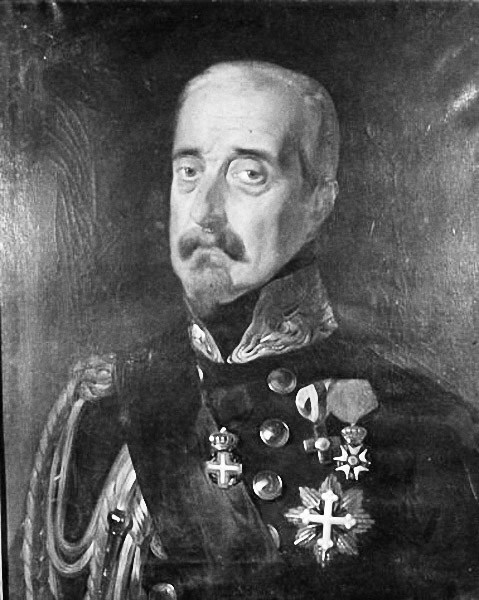
- Born: 7 April 1789; Turin, Kingdom of Sardinia
- Died: 18 March 1863 (aged 73); Turin, Kingdom of Italy
- Military career
- Allegiance: Napoleonic Kingdom of Italy; Kingdom of Sardinia

Alberto Ferrero La Marmora (or Della Marmora; 7 April 1789 – 18 March 1863) was an Italian soldier and naturalist. He was the elder brother to Alessandro Ferrero La Marmora, soldier and founder of the Bersaglieri, and to Alfonso Ferrero La Marmora, Italian general and statesman.

Born in Turin but educated at the Ecole Militaire de Fontainebleau, graduating in 1807, he was commissioned as a 2nd Lieutenant of infantry in the French Army. He was the second of four brothers, all of whom had distinguished military careers. He served under MacDonald in Calabria and in 1809 he joined the army of the Napoleonic Kingdom of Italy, participating in the campaign in Venetia. He fought at the Battle of Bautzen at the age of 24, and following the defeat of the combined Russian and Prussian forces in that engagement, he was personally decorated with the Legion d'Honneur by Napoleon Bonaparte. After Napoleon's abdication, Marmora gave his allegiance to the House of Savoy, the ruling house of the Kingdom of Sardinia.

Marmora was posted to Sardinia, from where he sent the first specimens of the warbler that bears his name, Sylvia sarda or Marmora's warbler, to Turin, where his description was read out at the Turin Academy on 28 August 1819.

He was forced to resign his commission during the insurrection of 1820–21, due to his sympathy with the rebels. Three years later, he was recalled to active service, mainly in Sardinia. Despite his liberal sympathies, he rose to the rank of General, and in 1840, he was given command of the Royal School of Marines. In 1845 in collaboration with the knight and major Carlo de Candia, he created the large maritime map of Sardinia in 1: 250,000 scale, travel version. He became Governor-General of Sardinia in 1849, eventually retiring to Turin where he died age 73 on 18 March 1863.

He wrote Viaggio in Sardegna (Travels in Sardinia) in 1860, which extended the study of the island previously made by Francesco Cetti. Many of the animals collected by La Marmora were sent to Franco Andrea Bonelli at Turin University, and he also corresponded with Bonelli's successor, Giuseppe Gené.

The highest point of Sardinia is Punta La Marmora, commemorating the physical and geological surveys of the island that Marmora conducted
