= Bruncu Spina ski area =

Ski resort in Sicily, Italy

Coordinates: 40°00′57″N 9°18′12″E

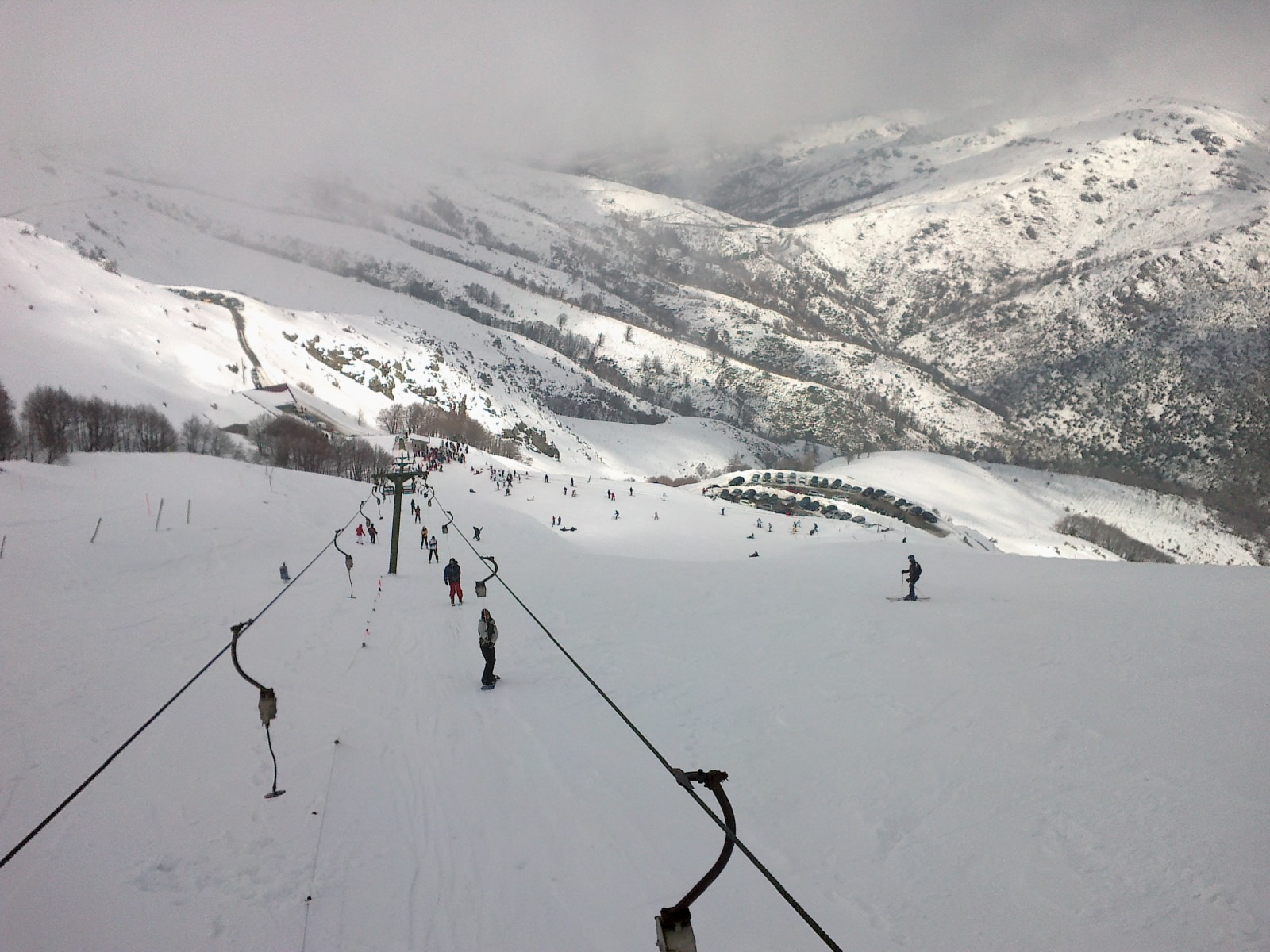
- Interactive map of Bruncu Spina ski area
- Location: Sardinia, Italy
- Nearest city: Fonni, Desulo, Villagrande Strisaili
- Top elevation: 1,820 m (5,970 ft)
- Base elevation: 1,570 m (5,150 ft)
- Skiable area: 3.3 km (2.1 mi) of runs
- Trails: 3,3km total; 0,4km (12%) easy; 1,9km (58%) intermediate; 1km (30%) difficult
- Lift system: 2 lifts
- Website: www.bruncuspina.com

The ski area Bruncu Spina is the only ski area in Sardinia. The systems are installed on the slopes of Bruncu Spina (Bruncu Spina, S'Arena, and Separadorgiu) and of Monte Spada. It is located in the Gennargentu massif, in the administrative territory of the municipalities of Fonni, Desulo and Villagrande Strisaili, in province of Nuoro.

Snowfall is frequent during winter and, in exceptional cases, can reach a thickness of more than one metre. The ski area is equipped with a Leitner LH420 snow groomer and a snowmobile.

The facilities of the Bruncu Spina represent the largest winter ski resort of Sardinia. They are located on the slopes of Bruncu Spina and are part of Monte Novu, in the administrative territory of the municipalities of Desulo and Villagrande Strisaili. However, the portion of Villagrande Strisaili in the countryside was granted in perpetual lease to the municipality of Fonni.

== See also ==
- Bruncu Spina
