= Alessandro Ferrero La Marmora =

Italian general (1799–1855)

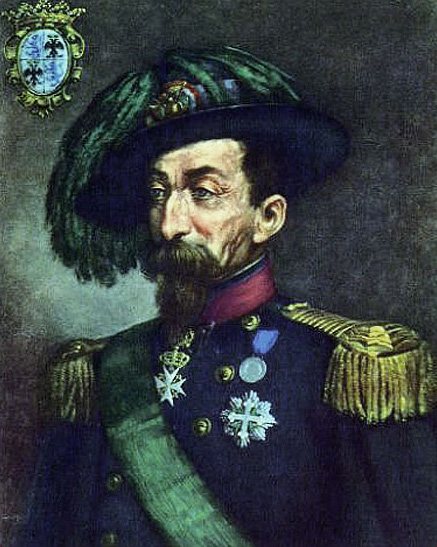
- Born: 27 March 1799; Turin, Kingdom of Sardinia
- Died: 7 June 1855 (aged 56)
- Military career
- Allegiance: Kingdom of Sardinia
- Branch: Royal Sardinian Army
- Conflicts: First Italian War of Independence; Crimean War

Alessandro Ferrero La Marmora (27 March 1799 – 7 June 1855) was an Italian general who is best remembered for founding the military unit known as the Bersaglieri. Two of his brothers were Alfonso Ferrero La Marmora and Alberto Ferrero la Marmora, the naturalist.

== Bersaglieri ==
La Marmora was born in Turin in what was then the Kingdom of Sardinia.

He had travelled to France, Britain, Bavaria, Saxony, Switzerland, and the Austrian county of Tyrol to study the armies and tactics of these countries and meticulously investigated the armaments and equipment of these foreign armies. He demonstrated an early interest in military technology, and worked assiduously to improve the breechloading gun, for example. At his own house, he built a workshop to experiment with military technology.

The first public appearance of the Bersaglieri was on the occasion of a military parade on 1 July 1836. The new corps impressed King Carlo Alberto, who immediately had them integrated as part of the Armata Sarda, the Piedmontese regular army.

Throughout the nineteenth century, under La Marmora's leadership, the Bersaglieri filled the role of skirmishers, screening the slow-moving line and column formations, but acting as special shock troops if required. They were originally intended to serve as mountain troops, as well; the climber Jean Antoine Carrel was a Bersagliere. When the Alpini Corps were created in 1872, a strong rivalry arose between the two elite corps.

== Military record ==
He participated in the Battle of Goito (1848) during the First Italian War of Independence and served as a division commander in the Crimean War.

== Death ==
He died in Balaklava from cholera shortly after disembarking there during the Crimean War. A memorial bust was erected outside among the statues and monuments of patriots on the Janiculum hill in Rome. The Giardino La Marmora in Turin is a park which includes a life-size bronze statue.
