= Congiu =

Congiu is a surname. Notable people with the surname include:

- Pierangelo Congiu (born 1951), Italian sprint canoeist
- Raimondo Congiu, Italian poet
