= Supramonte =

Mountain range located in central-eastern Sardinia, Italy

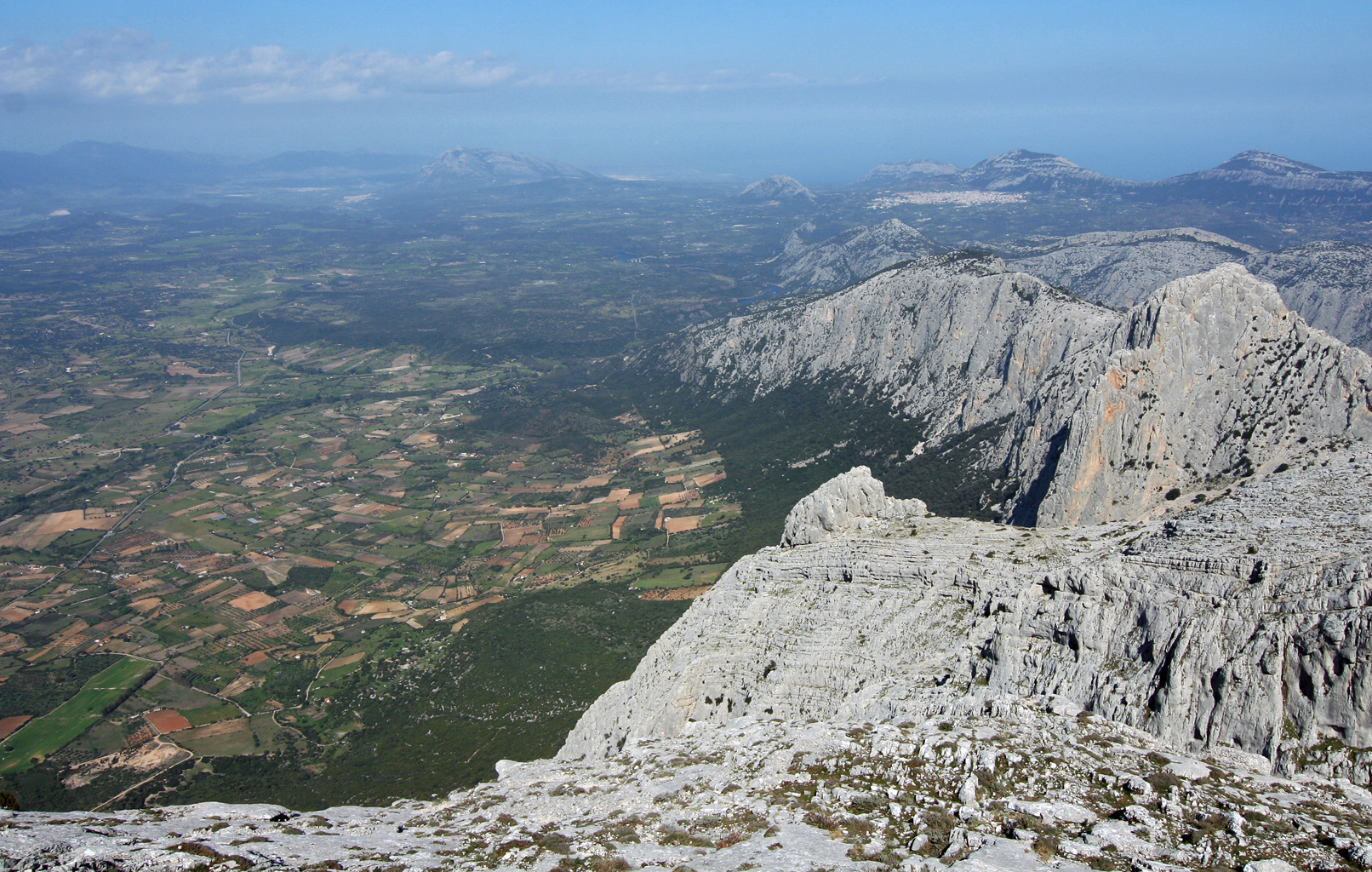
- View of Supramonte from Punta Sos Nidos

Highest point
- Peak: Monte Corrasi
- Elevation: 1,463 m (4,800 ft)

Geography
- Country: Italy
- Region: Sardinia
- Range coordinates: 40°14.6′N 9°25.9′E

The Supramonte is a mountain range located in central-eastern Sardinia, Italy. It lies northeast of the Gennargentu massif, traveling eastwards until it reaches the Tyrrhenian Sea at the Gulf of Orosei. It has an area of about 35,000 hectares, encompassing most of the territories of the comuni (municipalities) of Baunei, Dorgali, Oliena, Orgosolo and Urzulei. The populated areas of these comuni lie at the borders of the Supramonte, which, for the most part, is a largely uninhabited area of sharp limestone cliffs and deep, lush canyons.

== Geography ==
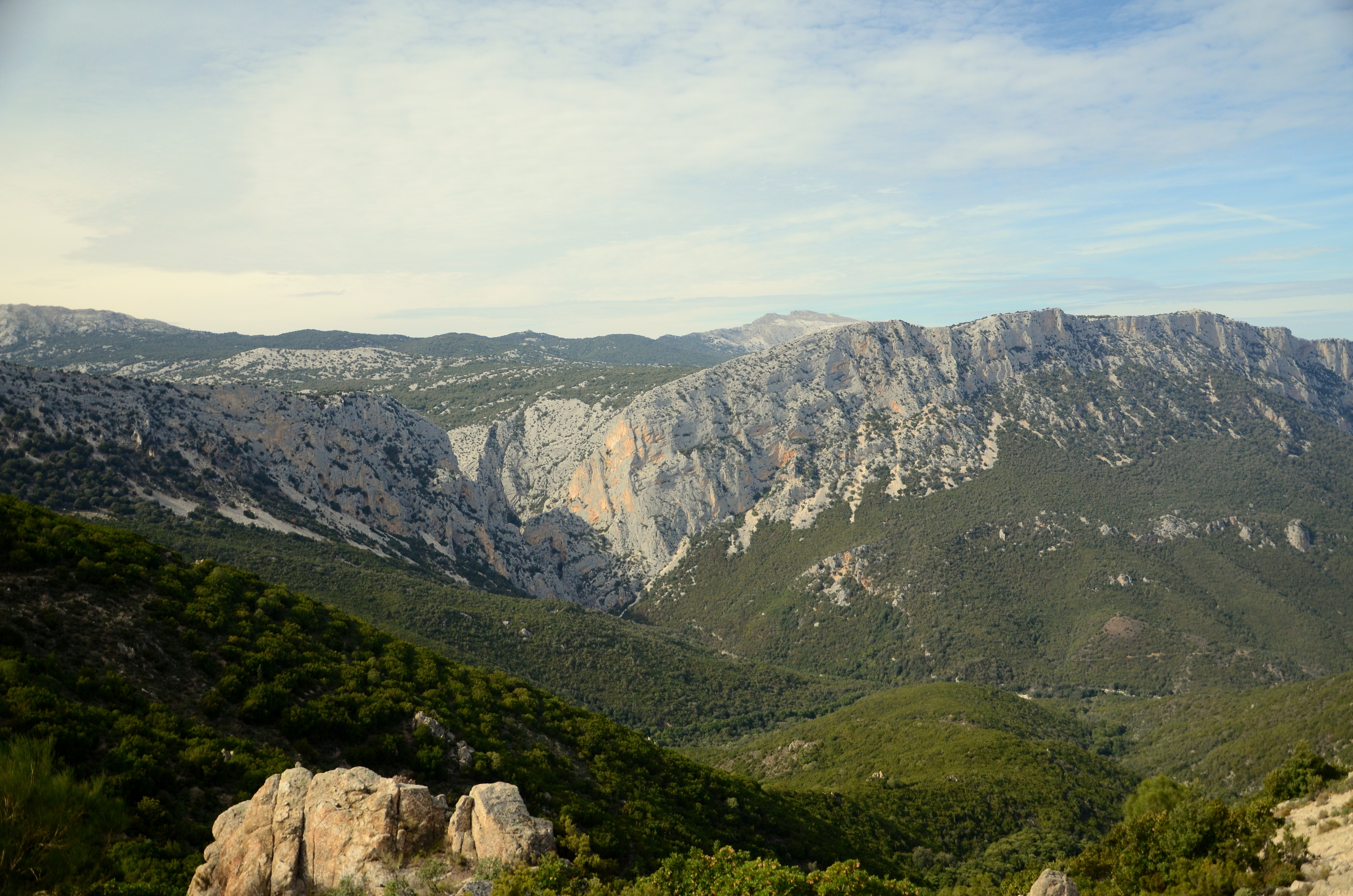
Gorroppu Canyon

Its highest peak is Monte Corrasi (1,463 m), and the average altitude of the chain is about 900 m. The Supramonte is characterized by Karstic highlands in which rivers have created deep ravines and canyons. The rivers flow mostly underground, creating several caves, such as the Grotta del Bue Marino, the Grotta di Ispinigoli (with the highest column in Europe, measuring 38 m), and the caves of Sa O'he ("The outlet", for the fact that there lies a little lake within, and it has a tributary river which pours out of the cave) and Su Bentu ("The Wind"). Springs such as Su Gologone can also be found. Other notable features on the range include the Plain of Donani'horo, the sinkhole of Su Sercone (in Orgosolo's language "Su Siel'hone"), the deep ravine of Gorropu and the limestone mountain of Monte Novo San Giovanni (1,316 m). The so-called "Supramonte Marino" ("Seaside Supramonte", to distinguish it from the inner "Supramonte Montano", "Mountain Supramonte") lies within the territories of Dorgali and Baunei, bordering the Gulf of Orosei and includes several renowned beaches (Cala Luna, Cala Sisine, Cala Mariolu, Cala Goloritzé) that are often located at the end of deep valleys called codulas.

== Archeology ==
In prehistoric times, the Supramonte area was more densely populated than it is today, as attested by traces of at least 76 villages, 46 nuraghes, 14 dolmens, 40 Giants' graves, 17 holy wells and 3 megalithic walls. Notable archeological sites include the village of Serra Orrios (located slightly north of the northern edge of the limestone lands), which contained about 70 circular huts and two megaron-like temples, and the nuraghe village of Tiscali, located in a strategically high position between the valleys of Lanaittu and Oddoene.

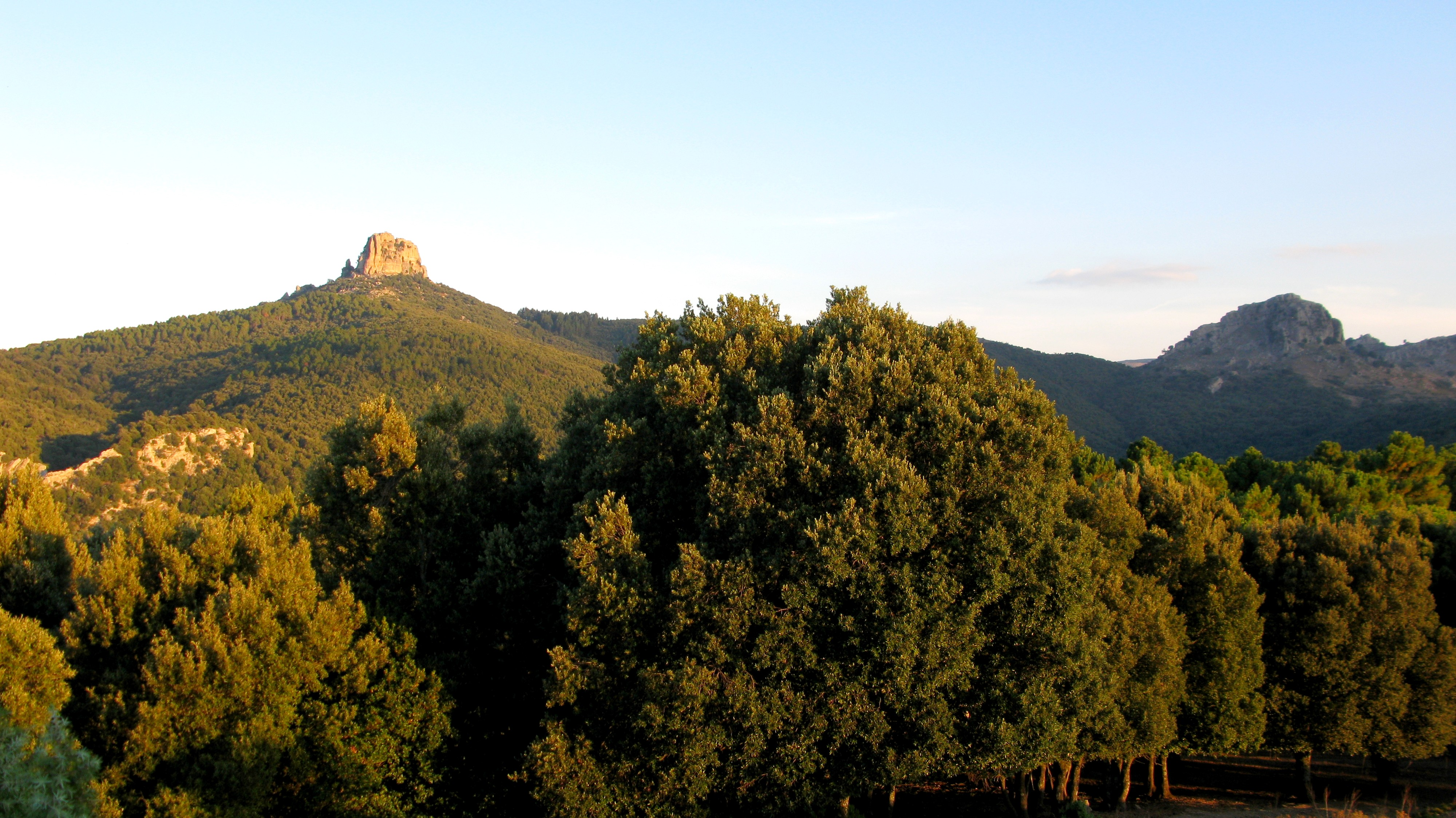
Supramonte of Orgosolo.

== See also ==
- Supramonte cave salamander
