= Cedrino =

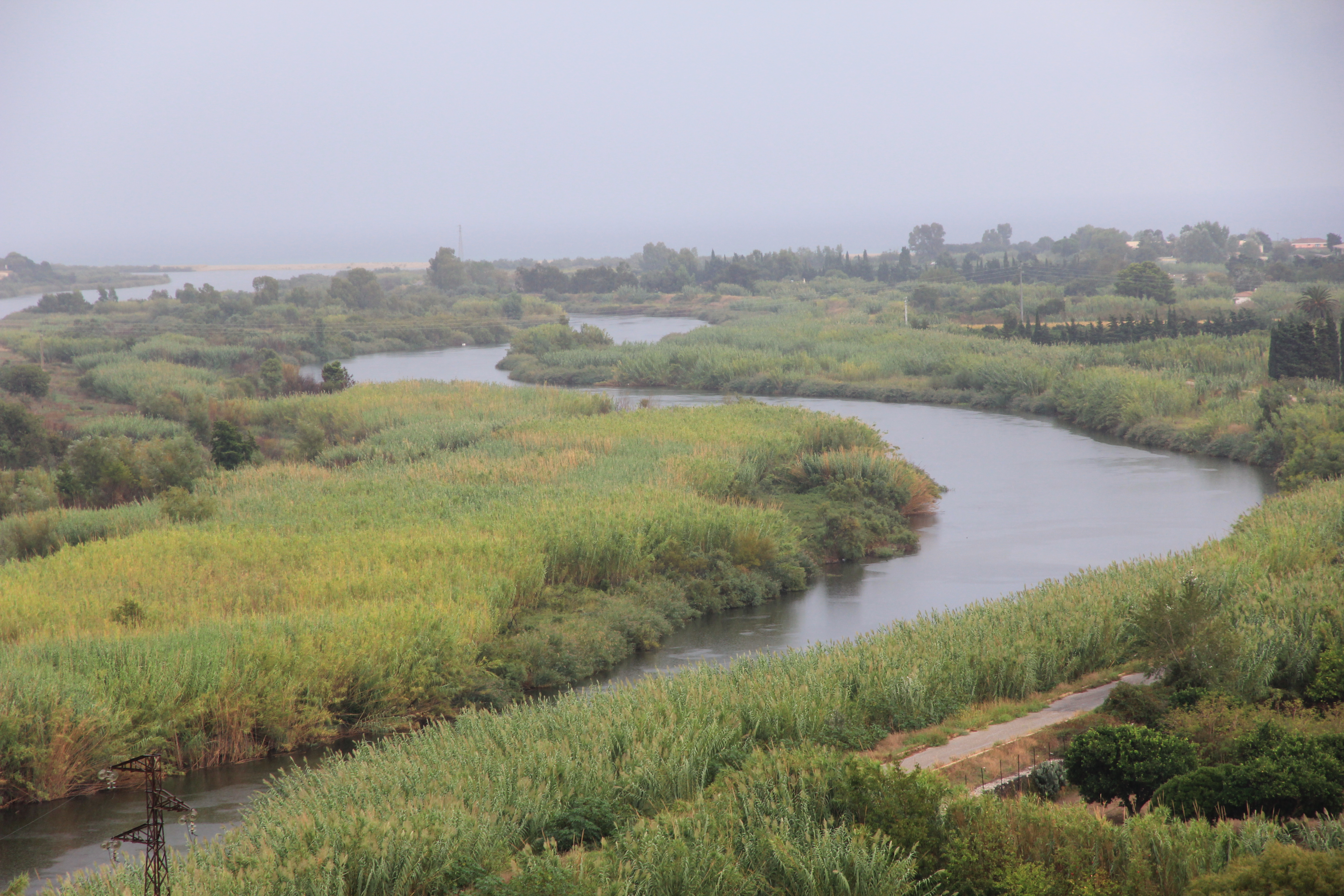
- Cedrino near Orosei

Location
- Country: Italy

Physical characteristics
- Source
  - location: Monte Fumai (Gennargentu massif)
  - elevation: 1,316 m (4,318 ft)
- Mouth: Gulf of Orosei
  - location: near Orosei
  - coordinates: 40°22′47″N 9°44′23″E
- Length: 80 km (50 mi)

The Cedrino is a river that flows in the province of Nuoro, in central-eastern Sardinia. Grazia Deledda talks about the river in various novels, including Canne al vento.

According to the historian Vittorio Angius, the name (Cedrus, Cedrinus, already mentioned by Ptolemy) derives from the abundant presence of cedar plants that have existed since Ancient Rome.
