= Gennargentu =

Mountain in Italy

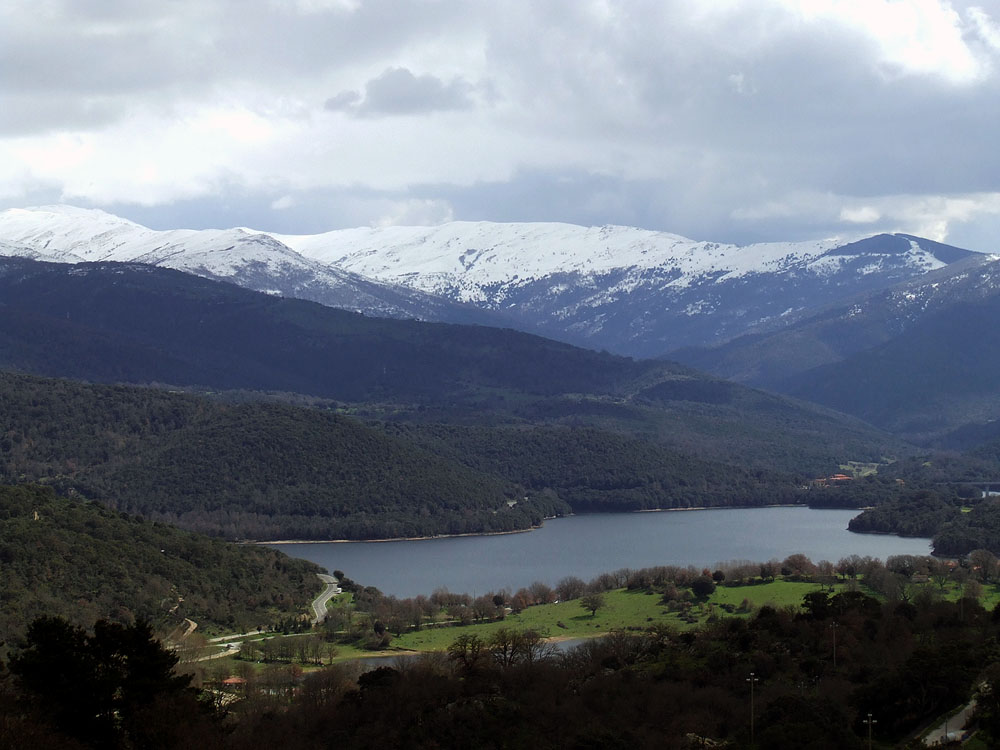
- View of Gennargentu

Highest point
- Peak: Punta La Marmora
- Elevation: 1,834 m (6,017 ft)

Naming
- Native name: Ghennarghentu (Sardinian)

Geography
- Location within Italy
- Country: Italy
- Region: Sardinia
- Range coordinates: 40°01′N 9°19′E

Gennargentu (Italian: [dʒennarˈdʒɛntu]; Sardinian: Ghennarghentu [ɡɛnːaɾˈɡentu]) is a large massif in central-southern Sardinia, Italy, encompassing the provinces of Nuoro and Ogliastra. It includes the highest peaks on the island, such as Punta La Marmora (1,834 m or 6,017 ft), Monte Spada (1,595 m or 5,233 ft), Punta Erbas Virdes (1,676 m or 5,499 ft), Bruncu Spina (1,829 m or 6,001 ft) and Punta Paulinu (1,792 m or 5,879 ft).

The range forms part of the Gennargentu National Park. Geologically, its rocks are amongst the oldest in Europe, and are therefore smooth shaped: rock types include schist, limestone and granite.

== Toponymy ==
The etymology of the name Gennargentu is not attested: it could mean "Silver Door" (Sardinian: jenna (d)e arghentu), "Door of the Winds" (jenna de bentu) or "Door of Absinthium" (jenna de assentu).

== Ski resorts ==
The mountains are home to the only ski resort on the island: Bruncu Spina ski area.

== See also ==
- Gennargentu National Park
- Bruncu Spina
