= Oliena =

Oliena Ulìana (Sardinian)
- Comune
- Comune di Oliena
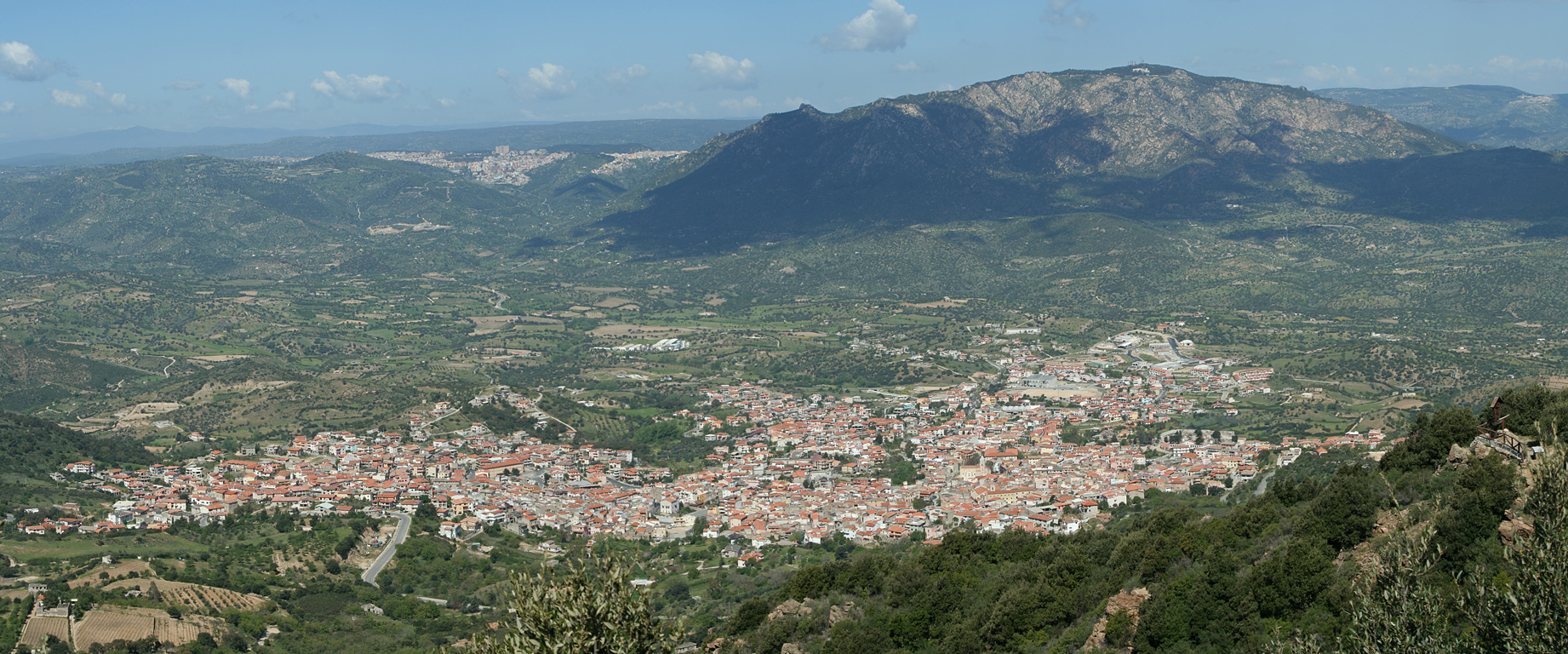
- Oliena (in the foreground)

- Location within Sardinia
- Coordinates: 40°16′N 9°24′E
- Country: Italy
- Region: Sardinia
- Province: Nuoro (NU)

Government
  - Mayor: Sebastiano Antioco Congiu

Area
  - Total: 165.74 km^{2} (63.99 sq mi)
- Elevation: 339 m (1,112 ft)

Population (2026)
  - Total: 6,405
  - Density: 38.64/km^{2} (100.1/sq mi)
- Demonym: Olianesi
- Time zone: UTC+1 (CET)
  - Summer (DST): UTC+2 (CEST)
- Postal code: 08025
- Dialing code: 0784
- Patron saint: Saint Ignatius of Loyola, San Lussorio
- Saint day: 31 July – 21 August
- Website: Official website

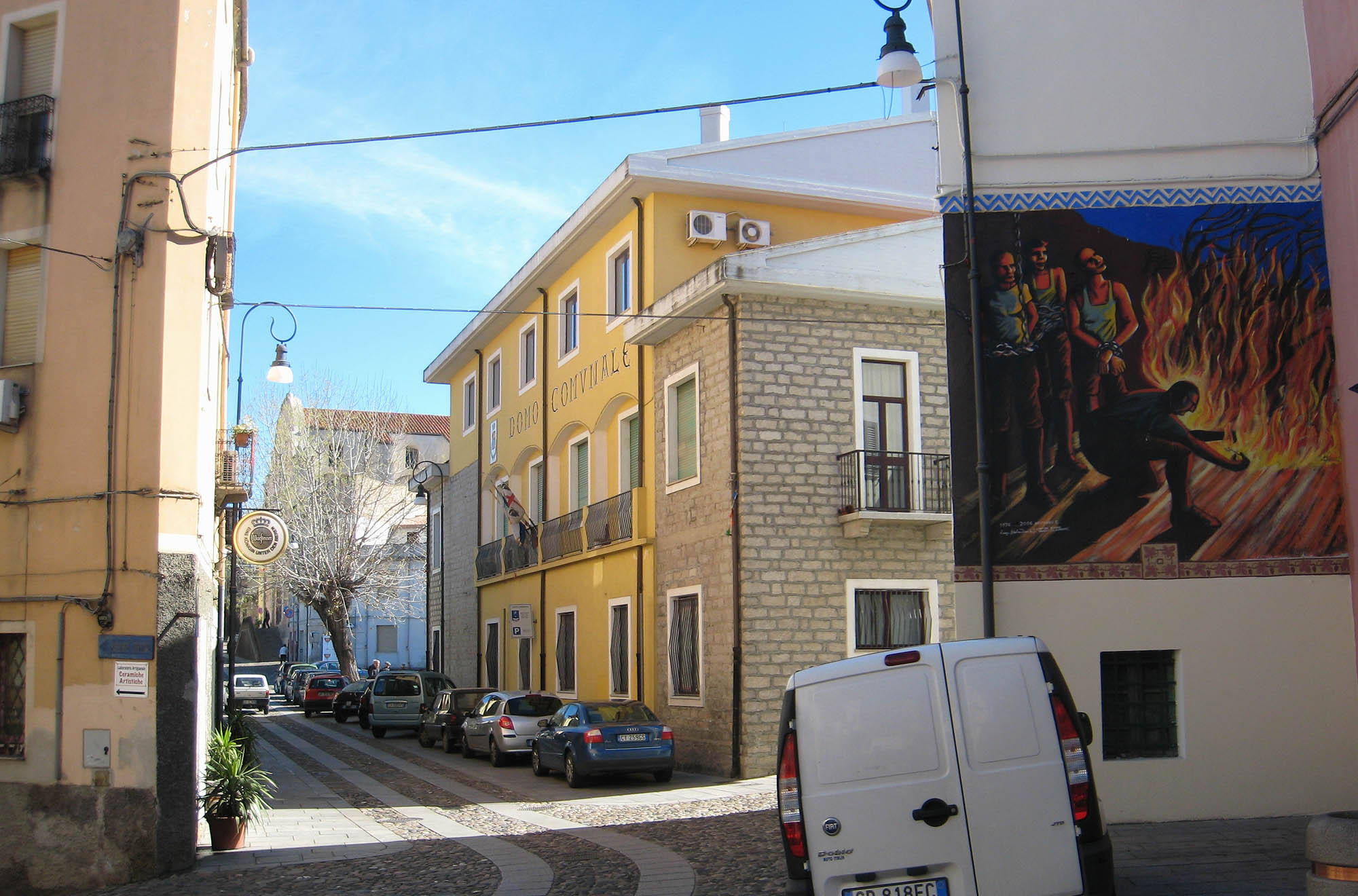
Domo comunale

Oliena (Italian pronunciation: [oˈliːena] or less correctly [oˈljɛːna]; Sardinian: Ulìana [uˈli.ana]) is a town and comune (municipality) in the Province of Nuoro in the autonomous island region of Sardinia in Italy, located about 120 kilometres (75 mi) north of Cagliari and about 10 kilometres (6.2 mi) northeast of Nuoro. It has 6,405 inhabitants.

== History ==
The territory of Oliena has been inhabited since the Palaeolithic Era until today.

The first proofs about the above-mentioned presences have been found inside the Grotta Corbeddu. The Nuragic civilization featured at least 54 villages, 30 nuraghes, sepulchres, buildings with a likely sacred destination were calculated.

As part of the medieval Giudicato of Torres, Oliena was one of the curatorie of Posada. Later it was held by the Republic of Pisa.

During the war between the Aragonese and the Giudicato of Arborea, the commune was occupied by Eleanor of Arborea's troops. The village, developed in medieval times, at the foot of a castle remembered in toponomy, remained to Arborea until its fall.

Oliena was passed to the Carrozs family, and later annexed to the marquisate of Quirra, as a feudal state of the Carrozs, and then of the Osorios family, who held it until 1839.

== Geography ==
The territory of Oliena extends towards the north-eastern slope of the Supramonte, as far as the eastern foot of mount Ortobene, embracing the valley crossed by Cedrino river, which opens towards the plains of Galtellì and Orosei.

The inhabited centre lies about 380 metres (1,250 ft) above sea level at the foot of a mountain that rises vertically to the Mount Corrasi.

Oliena borders the municipalities of Dorgali, Nuoro, Orgosolo and Urzulei.

=== Flora and fauna ===
Species living in the most inaccessibles zones of the Mount Corrasi include:

- Aquilegia nugorensis
- Armeria morisii
- Campanula forsythii
- Cerastium supramontanum
- Erinus alpinus
- Limonium
- Nepeta foliosa
- Paeonia mascula
- Ribes sardoum Martelli
- Taxus baccata

Wildlife species living in the Oliena territory include:

- peregrine falcon
- royal eagle
- moufflon
- wild boar
- buzzard
- Sardinian hare
- Sardinian fox
- Sardinian deer
- Speleomantes supramontis, a geo-newt,
- Griffon vulture

== Demographics ==
Historical population
Year	Pop.	±%
1861	3,138	—
1871	3,357	+7.0%
1881	3,665	+9.2%
1901	4,169	+13.8%
1911	4,427	+6.2%
1921	4,502	+1.7%
1931	4,914	+9.2%
1936	5,316	+8.2%
1951	6,030	+13.4%
1961	7,008	+16.2%
1971	7,033	+0.4%
1981	7,279	+3.5%
1991	7,724	+6.1%
2001	7,604	−1.6%
2011	7,355	−3.3%
2021	6,657	−9.5%
Source: ISTAT

As of 2026, the population is 6,405, of which 49.4% are male, and 50.6% are female. Minors make up 11.8% of the population, and seniors make up 28.9%.

=== Immigration ===
As of 2025, immigrants make up 2.5% of the total population. The 5 largest foreign countries of birth are Romania, Belgium, Germany, Senegal, and France.

== Economy ==
=== Agriculture and typical products ===
The position of the territory is favourable, thanks to its healthiness and the presence of spring-waters still today, permitting to practise a rich variety of cultures on the plains (olive-groves, orchards, vineyards, kitchen gardens). Pastures are prevalently destined to sheep and cattle-breeding.

The typical products are:

- Sardinian "Pecorino" cheese (sheep's milk cheese),
- cheese cream, Sa Vrughe (a kind of cheese),
- sausages
- ham
- bacon, tammati 'hin vrughe salìa, (tomatoes and salty kind of cheese)

The pasta:

- angelottos
- ma'harrones de bocciu (gnocchi)
- maharrones de busa

The sweets:

- Sevadas
- 'hasadinas
- marigosos
- amarettos
- guelfos
- hidongiadu
- pistoccos 'hin sa cappa
- aranciada
- ori'heddos
- meli'heddas

The bread:

- pane carasàu
- paneddas

=== Nepente wine ===
The Nepente of Oliena is a vintage wine, obtained from a selection of grapes Cannonau cultivated in the municipality of Oliena.

The wine is red-brown and becomes amaranth when aged.

== Main sights ==
=== Churches ===
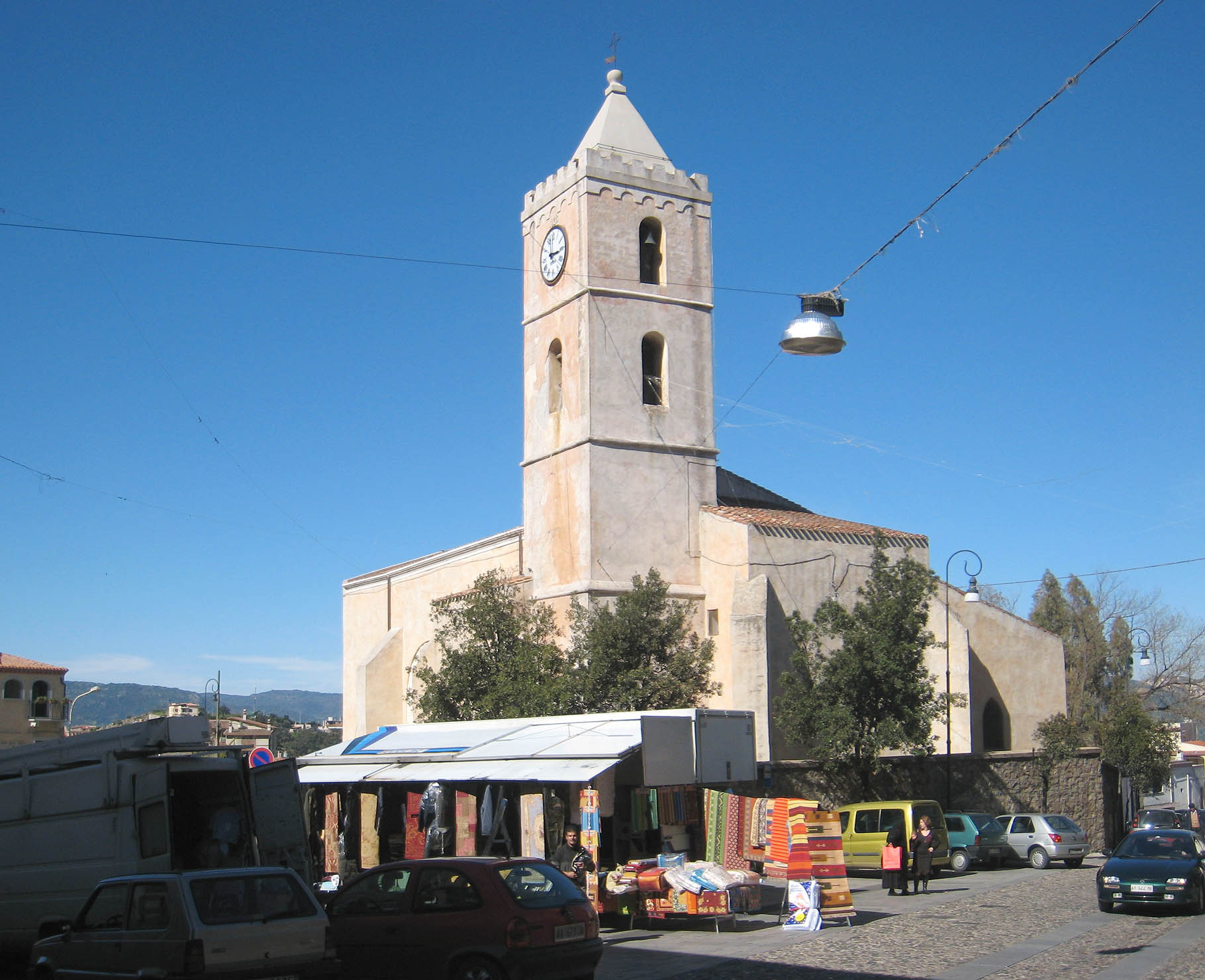
The church of Santa Maria is at the centre of Oliena.

- Church of Santa Maria was built during the Pisan period.
- Former church of Sant'Ignazio
- Santa Croce (Santa Rughe)
- San Lussorio

=== Nuraghes ===
The Nuraghe Biriài is located, between two rocky spurs, in a position that makes it able to dominate the whole Cedrino valley. The passage, leading to a suspension door to the north, forms a trapezoidal span surmounted by a powerful architrave with a window lintel.

The Nuraghe Luduruju is located on the border of the Gollei Ospène Plateau. It follows the single-tower typology, with one room, built with slab-shaped blocks of local basalt.

The Nuraghe Otha'he stands on a rocky outcrop. It was surrounded along its perimeter by a wall curtain. In spite of the limestone (a rock hard to work upon), it was used.

In the interior of the Nuraghe Susùne, a tholos room opens to the internal passage. According to the transept scheme, it provided another trapezoidal light oriented to the west.

Other nuraghes include Nuraghe Suvegliu.

=== Sepulchres ===
The Megalithic sepulchre of Catteddu Crìspu is formed by two hangings; one external with megalithic blocks, and the other internal with the small hewn rocks. The interior is encumbered by a large slab with three hollows carved on its ends.

The Domos de Gurpìa are examples of Domus de Janas excavated in a granite erratic block.

Other 'Domus de Janas include:

- Domos de Suvangiu
- Domos de Jumpàdu
- Domos de Frathale

=== Nuragic village of Tiscali ===
Tiscali is situated in the large grotto that shelters the village. Discovered at the end of the 17th century, it is commonly considered to be a Nuragic site. The inhabited centre of huts, built with small stones joined by mud, was for inhabited also in the Roman and Medieval ages.

=== Nuragic village of Sedda 'e sos Carros ===
This village is located in the Lanaitho Valley.

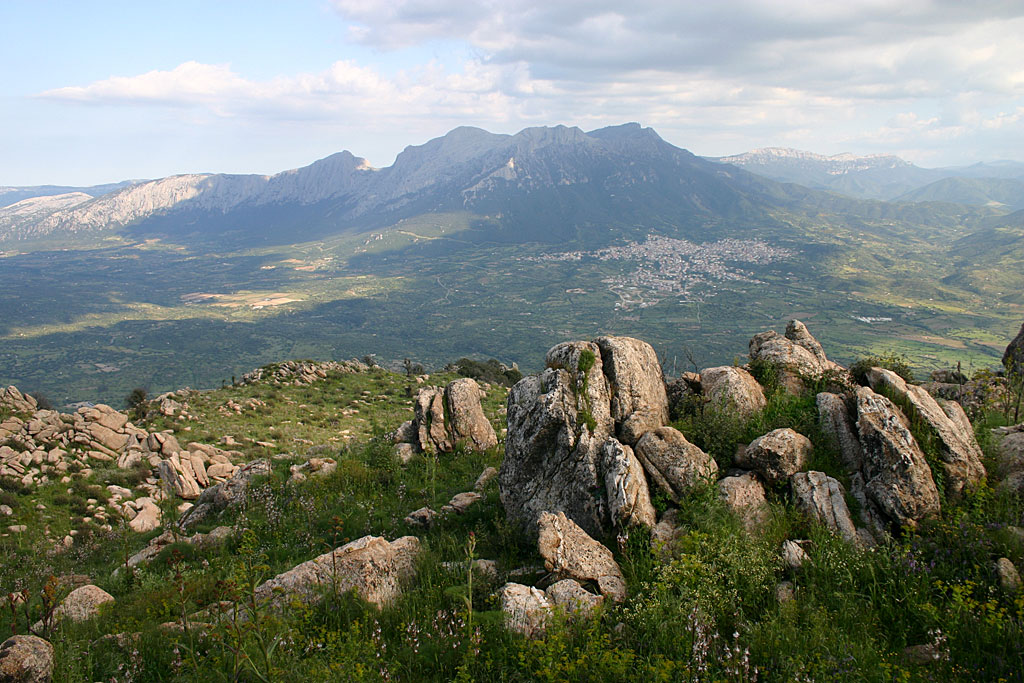
Oliena, on the right, with the Mount Corrasi in the background.

== Notable people ==
- Giovanni Corbeddu Salis (1844–1898), famous bandit considered as "The Robin Hood of Sardinia".
- Gianfranco Zola, former Chelsea FC and Cagliari player, and former West Ham United manager.

== Sources ==
- Dolores Turchi, Sardegna mediterranea, 1999
- Gianfranca Salis, Ambiente e Archeologia, 1999
- Francesco Murgia, Lanaitho valley, Sa Ohe, Su Gologone - 1999
- Luisa Lecca, Sebastiano Carai, Oliena. Storia, cultura, ambiente, tradizione, 2009
