= Punta La Marmora =

Mountain in Italy

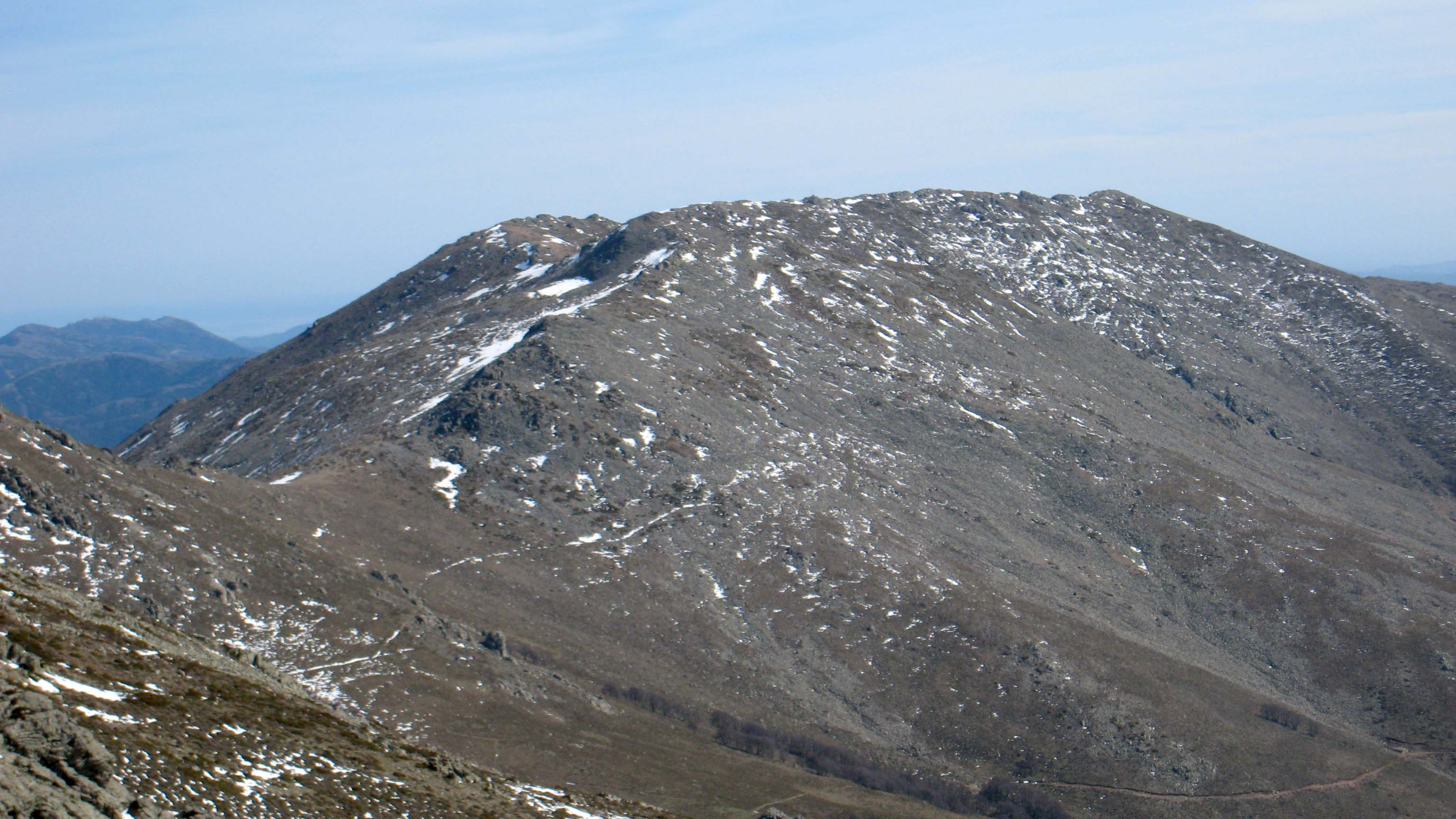
- The summit of Punta La Marmora, seen from Bruncu Spina

Highest point
- Elevation: 1,834 m (6,017 ft)
- Prominence: 1,834 m (6,017 ft)
- Isolation: 204.65 km (127.16 mi)
- Listing: Ultra
- Coordinates: 39°59′17″N 9°19′27″E

Naming
- Native name: Perdas Carpìas (Sardinian)

Geography
- Location within Sardinia
- Location: Sardinia, Italy
- Parent range: Gennargentu

Punta La Marmora (Sardinian: Perdas Carpìas) is a mountain in the Gennargentu range, Sardinia located in Italy.

== Geography ==
The mountain belongs to Nuoro province, in the Barbagia mountain area of inner Sardinia. With its summit at an elevation of 1,834 m, it is the highest peak on the island. Dedicated to the geographer Alberto Ferrero della Marmora, it is included in the communal territories of Desulo and Arzana.

Punta La Marmora is situated just east of the approximate center of Sardinia and the summit offers good views of the entire island. On a clear day most of the coastline and all the surrounding peaks are visible.

== See also ==
- List of European ultra prominent peaks
- List of Italian regions by highest point
