= Sassari–Tempio–Palau railway =

Railway line in Sardinia, Italy

Sassari-Tempio–Palau railway
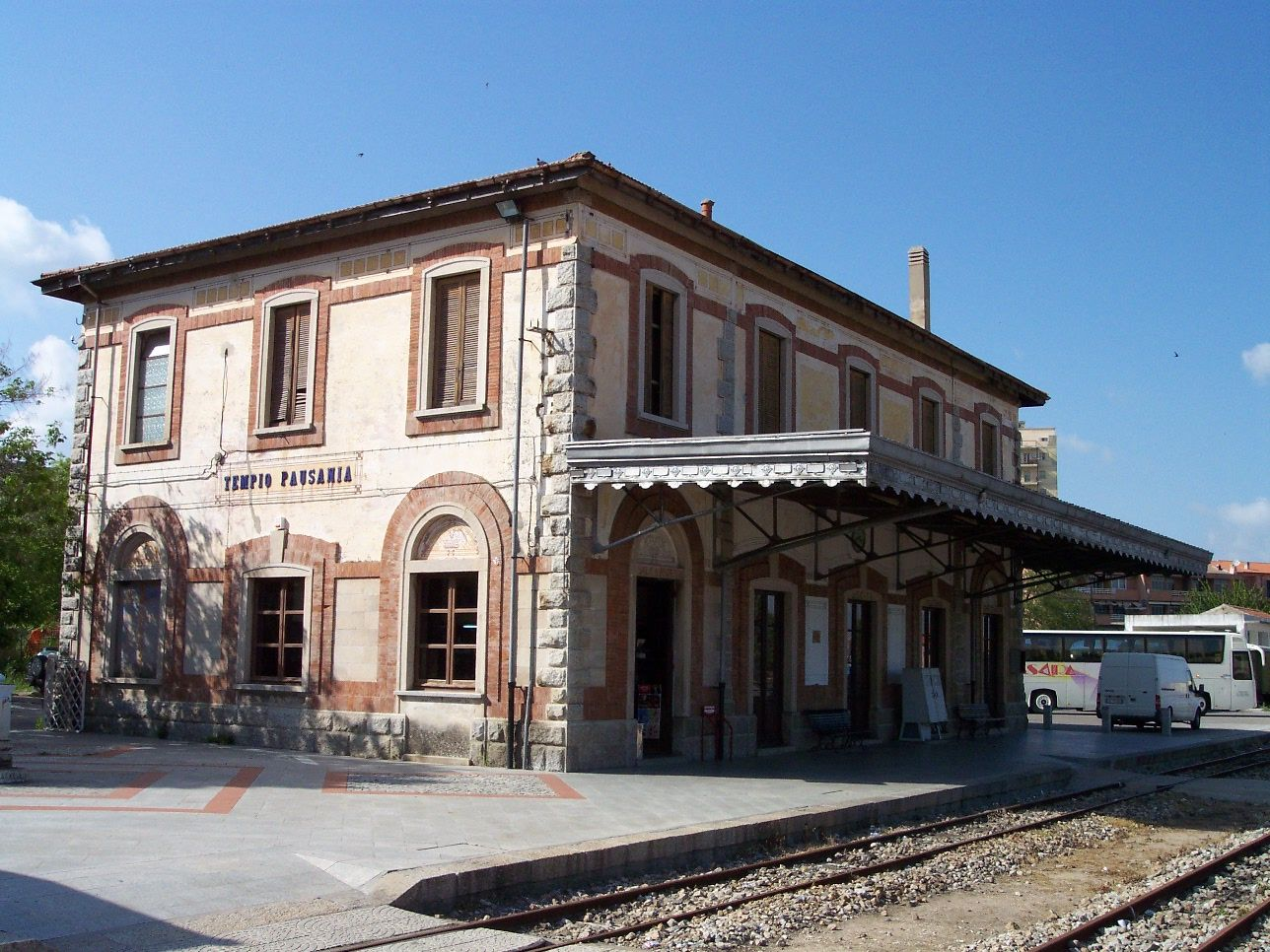
- Railway station in Tempio Pausania

Overview
- Status: in use
- Locale: Sardinia, Italy
- Termini: Sassari railway station; Palau, Sardinia
- Stations: 25

Service
- Type: turistic rail
- Operator(s): ARST

History
- Opened: 1888-1931-1932

Technical
- Line length: 150 km (93 mi)
- Track gauge: 950 mm (3 ft 1 3/8 in) narrow gauge
Route map
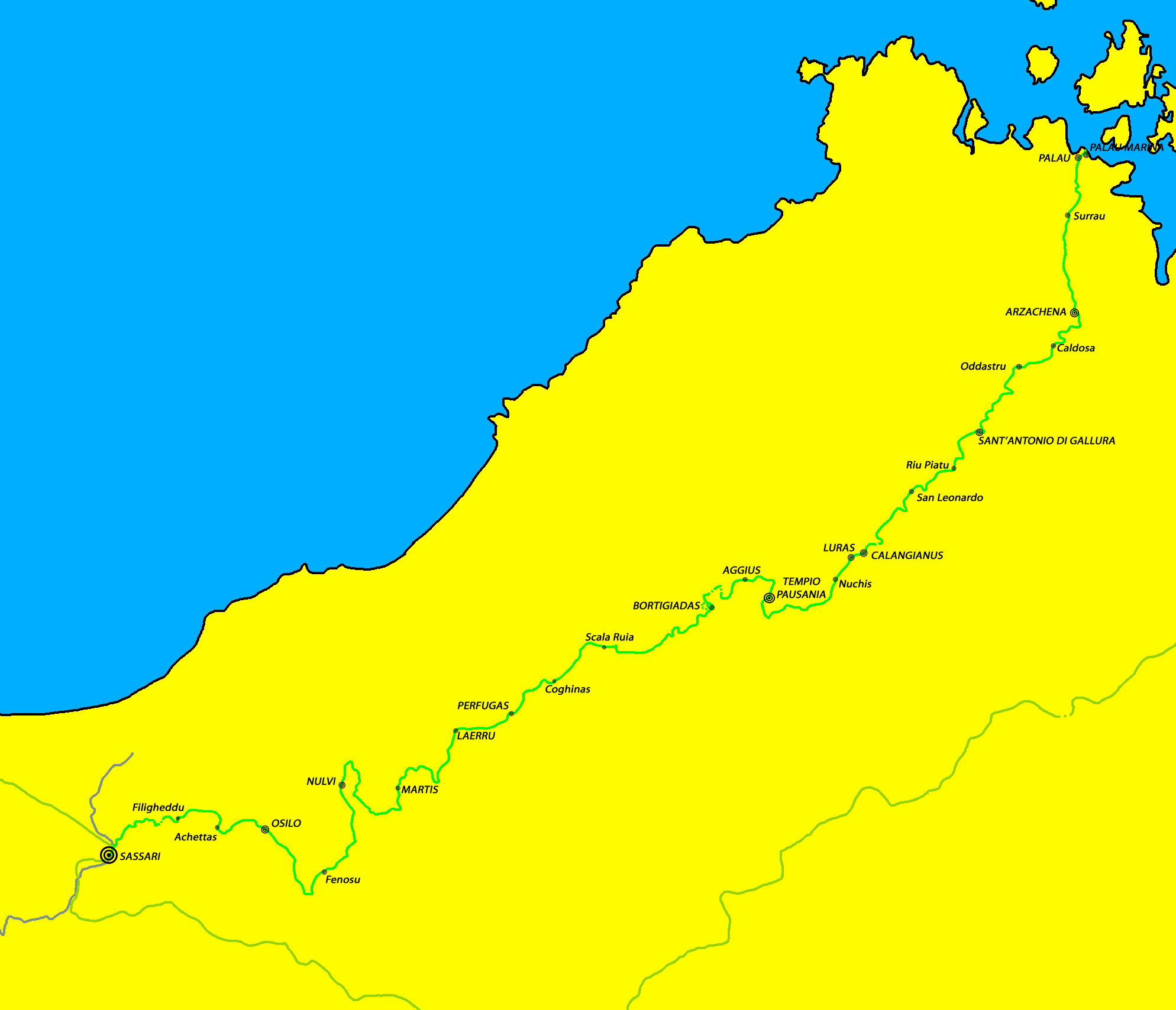

The Sassari–Tempio-Palau railway is a secondary narrow gauge railway line in Sardinia, Italy, managed by the public regional company ARST. A great part of the line was used for touristic purposes from 1997 on, only a limited section from Sassari to Nulvi was still managed for public transport until February 1, 2015. Since that day the whole line has been in use exclusively by and for the Trenino Verde touristic service.
