= Ferrovie della Sardegna =

Defunct Italian company

ARST Gestione FdS
- Formerly: Ferrovie della Sardegna
- Type: Limited liability company
- Industry: Rail transport
- Predecessors: Ferrovie Complementari della Sardegna; Strade Ferrate Sarde
- Founded: 1989
- Defunct: 25 October 2010
- Fate: Integrated into ARST
- Successor: ARST
- Headquarters: Cagliari, Italy
- Products: Rail transport, Road transport

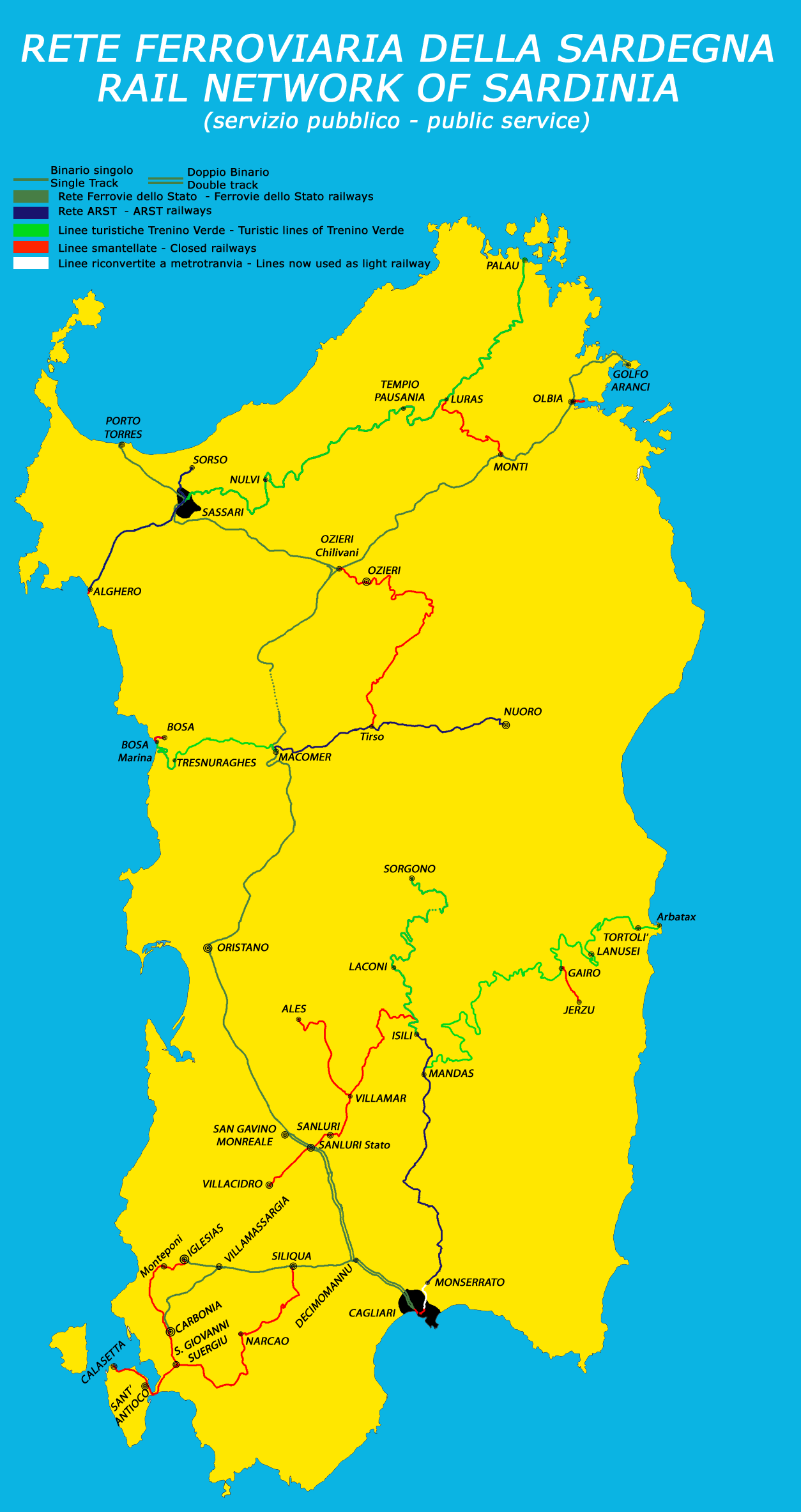
Map of Railways in Sardinia

The Ferrovie della Sardegna (Railways of Sardinia), known also as ARST Gestione FdS between 2008 and 2010 and with the abbreviation FdS, was an Italian public company that managed the regional railway network in the island of Sardinia, Italy. In 2010 it was totally integrated with the main regional public transport company, ARST (Azienda Regionale Sarda Trasporti).

It was the second railway operator in Sardinia, after Ferrovie dello Stato, having 203 kilometres (126 mi) of railways used for public transport, plus another four tourist lines, known as Trenino Verde, which run through the wildest parts of the island.

The company was founded in 1989. It is a narrow gauge railway system, using diesel locomotives and multiple units, electrified tram-trains in the metropolitan areas of Sassari and Cagliari and vintage diesel and steam locomotives on the tourist lines.

Today works are in progress to modernise several lines with the electrification of routes around the metropolitan areas of Sassari and Cagliari.

== Lines ==
=== Public Transport Lines ===
- Line Macomer-Tirso-Nuoro
- Line Sassari-Sorso (work is in progress converting the line to a light rail transit)
- Line Sassari-Alghero (planned conversion to light rail transit)
- Line Monserrato-Isili
- Metro-tramway of Sassari
- Metro-tramway of Cagliari

=== Tourist Lines (Trenino Verde) ===
- Line Macomer-Bosa
- Line Sassari-Nulvi-Tempio Pausania-Luras-Palau
- Line Mandas-Gairo-Arbatax
- Line Mandas-Isili-Sorgono

=== Dismantled Lines ===
- Line Siliqua-San Giovanni Suergiu-Calasetta (Ferrovie Meridionali Sarde)
- Line Iglesias-Monteponi-San Giovanni Suergiu (Ferrovie Meridionali Sarde)
- Line Gairo-Jerzu
- Line Isili-Villamar-Villacidro
- Line Villamar-Ales
- Line Tirso-Ozieri
- Line Luras-Monti

== Gallery ==
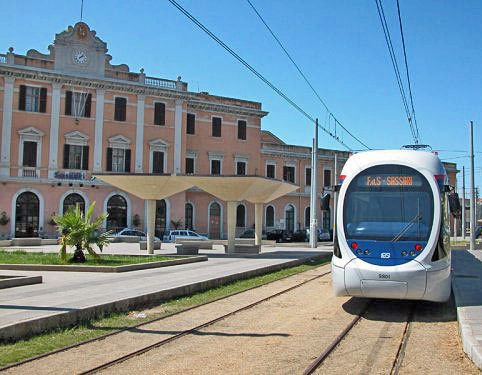
Tram AnsaldoBreda Sirio in Sassari

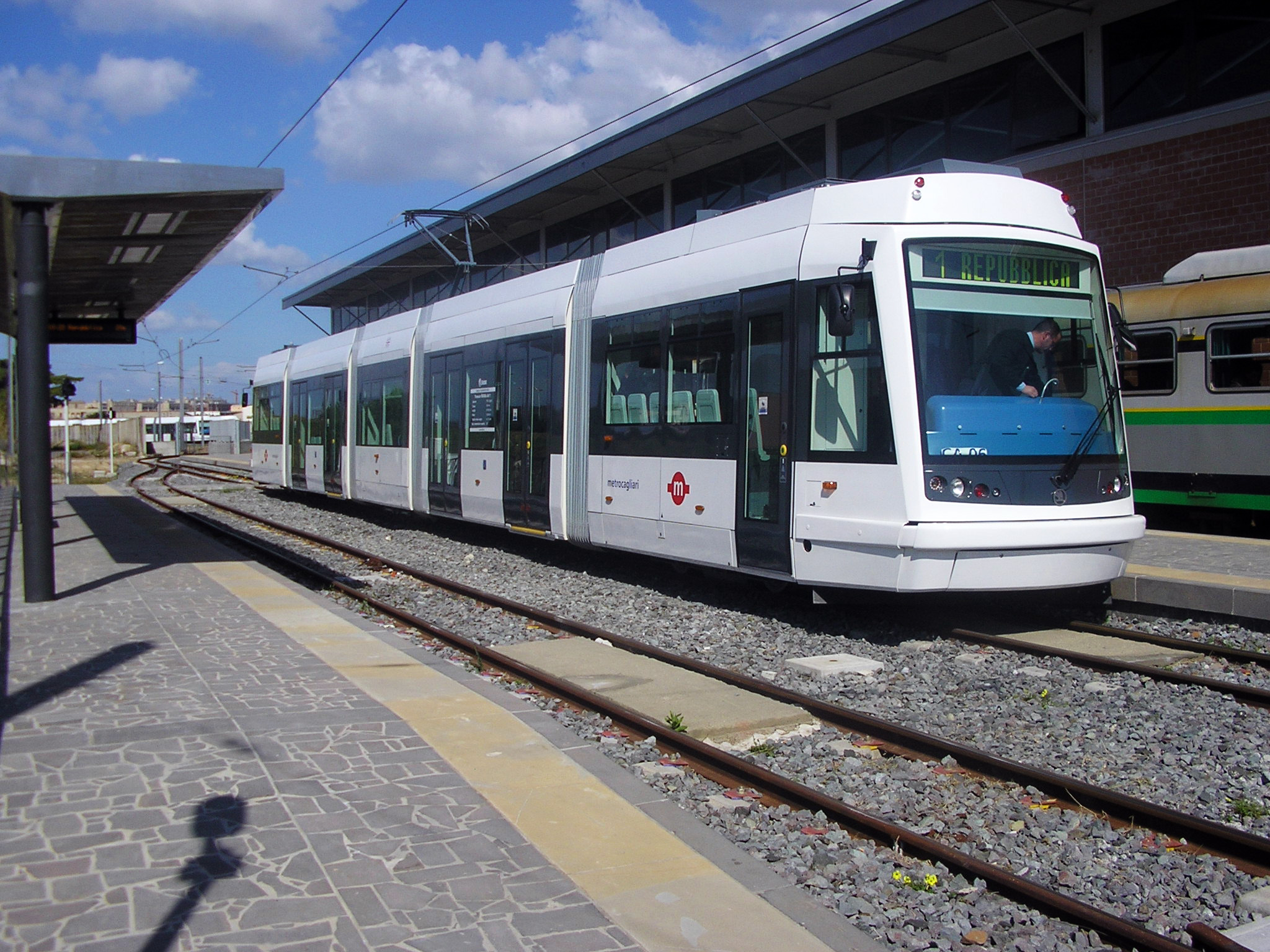
Tram Škoda 06 T in Cagliari

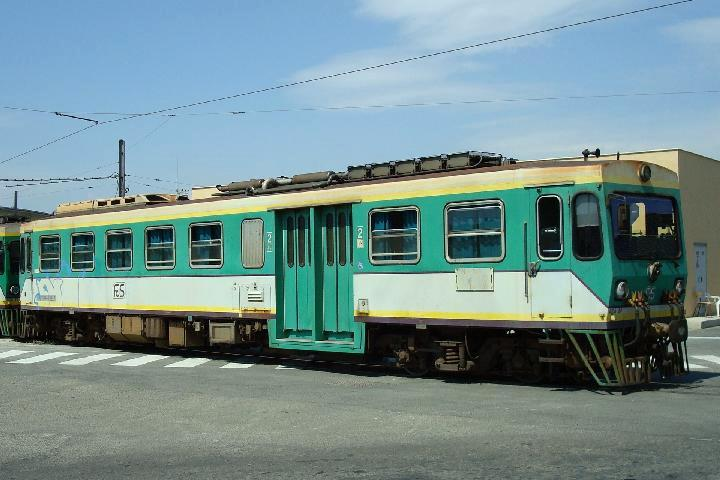
Multiple Unit ADe 91-98 (1990s)

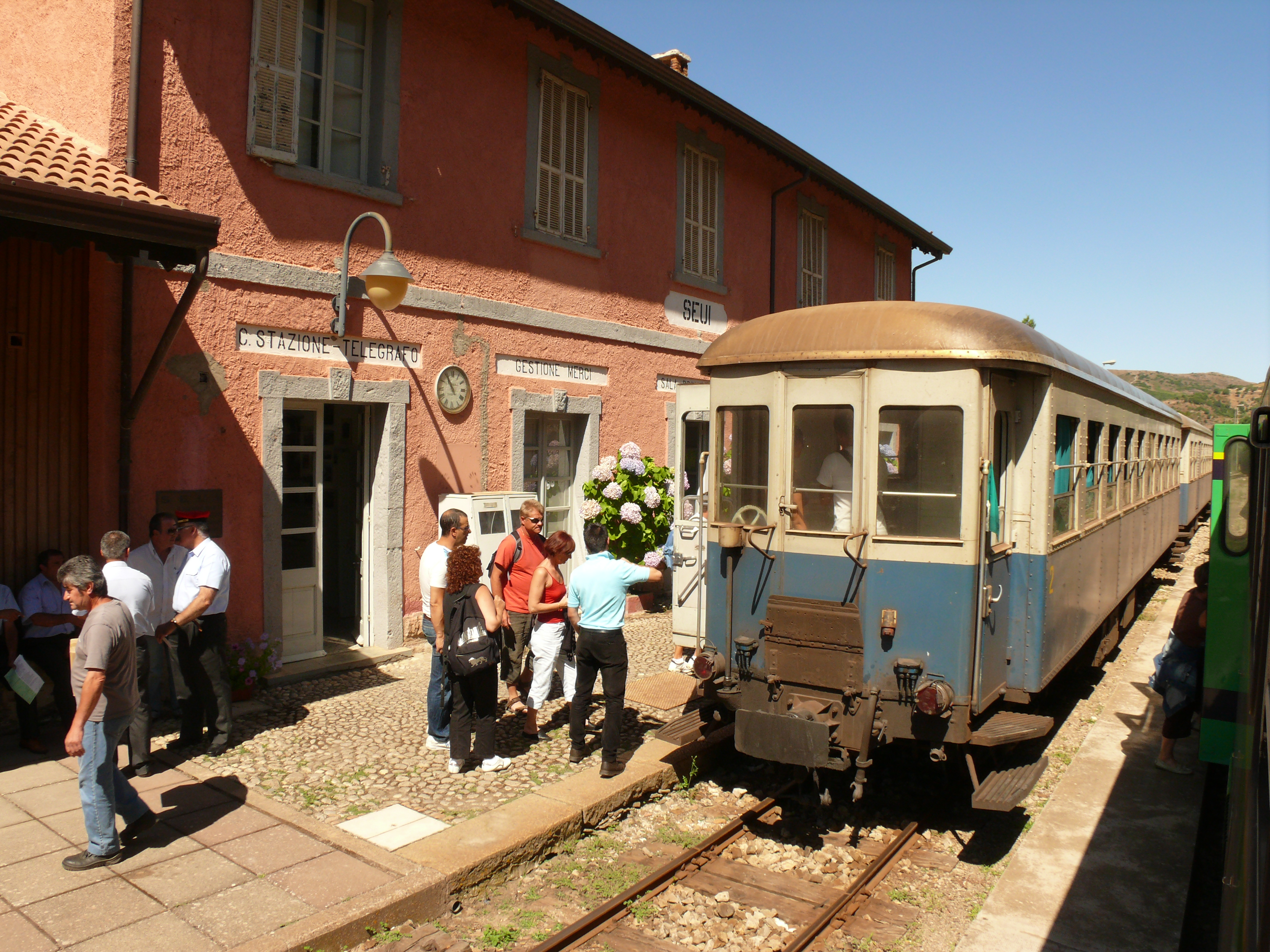
Railway station in Seui

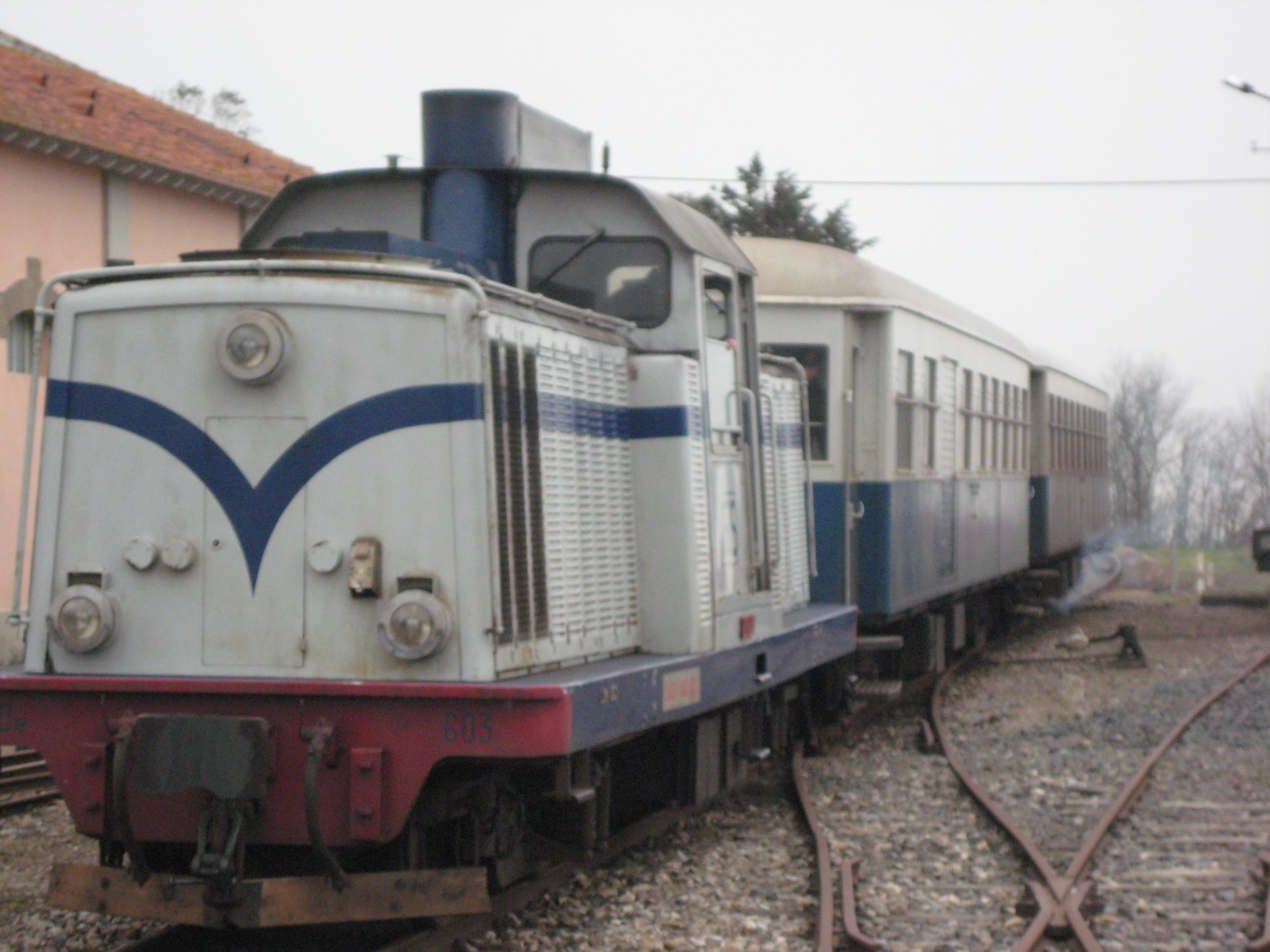
Locomotive LDe 603

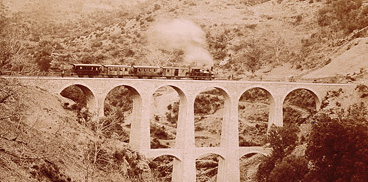
Isili-Sorgono railway in the last years of the 19th century

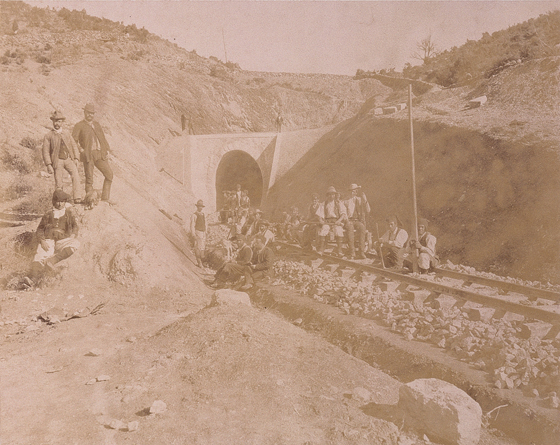
Work in progress for the Meana Sardo tunnel (about 1888)

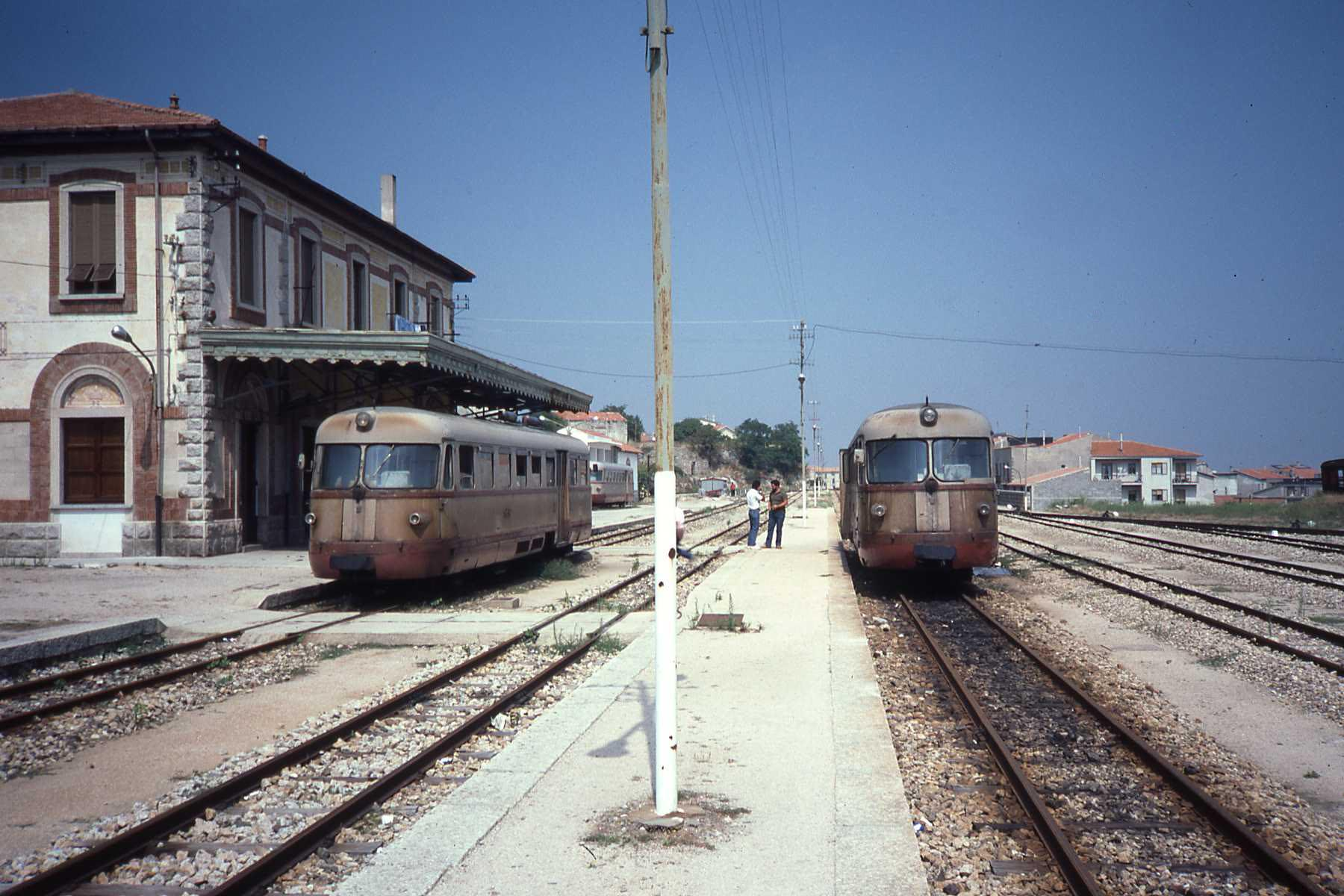
Crossing train in Tempio station in 1984

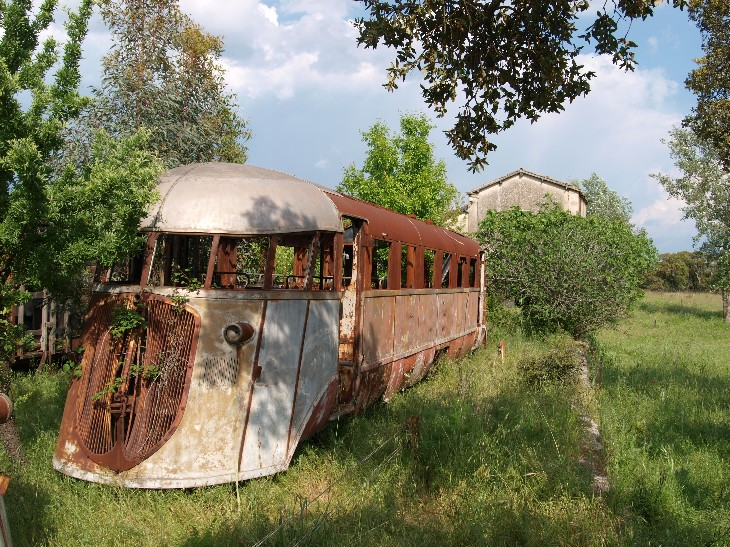
abandoned littorina train (1930s) along the dismantled line Ozieri-Tirso

== See also ==
- Sassari Tram-train
- Cagliari Metro-tramway
