= Sassari railway station =

Railway station in Sassari, Sardinia, Italy

Sassari
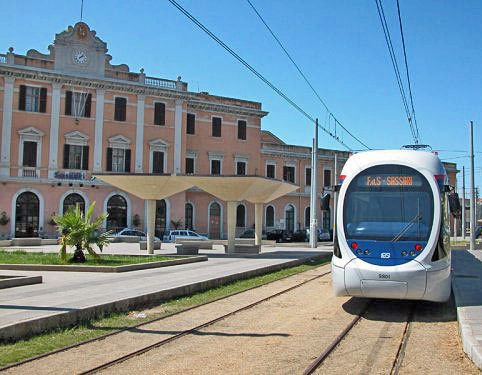
- View of the station building and tramway stop

General information
- Location: Piazza Stazione; 07100 Sassari; Sassari, Sassari, Sardinia; Italy
- Coordinates: 40°43′46″N 8°33′14″E
- Owner: Rete Ferroviaria Italiana
- Lines: Ozieri-Porto Torres (FS); Sassari–Alghero (FdS); Sassari–Tempio–Palau (FdS); Sassari–Sorso (FdS)
- Platforms: 3 (6 tracks)
- Train operators: Trenitalia; Ferrovie della Sardegna
- Connections: Sassari Tram-train; ATP buses

History
- Opened: 1884; 142 years ago
Location
- Location within Sardinia

Sassari is the main railway station in the Italian city of Sassari, the second largest city of Sardinia. It is owned jointly by the Ferrovie dello Stato (FS), the national rail company of Italy, and the Ferrovie della Sardegna (FdS).

== History ==
The station opened in 1884, when the FS line from Cagliari was completed. In 1888 it became the terminal of the FdS Sassari–Alghero line. On 14 May 1943, during the Second World War, it was damaged during a bombardment.

== Structure and transport ==
Located in the north-western side of the city and in front of downtown, the large station building has three floors. Since 2006 a stop for the new metro-tramway line has been located in front of it. Tracks in the station are mainly 1,435 mm (4 ft 8 1/2 in) standard gauge and partly 950 mm (3 ft 1 3/8 in) narrow gauge. The latter are used by the three FdS lines. Three terminal tracks, also used by FdS trains, are located in north of the building. Beyond the three passing tracks served by platforms, there are four other tracks used for freight traffic.

As with other stations in Sardinia, Sassari station is not electrified. It is served by regional trains to Porto Torres, Olbia, Oristano and Cagliari. The adjacent tram-train stop provides transit service.

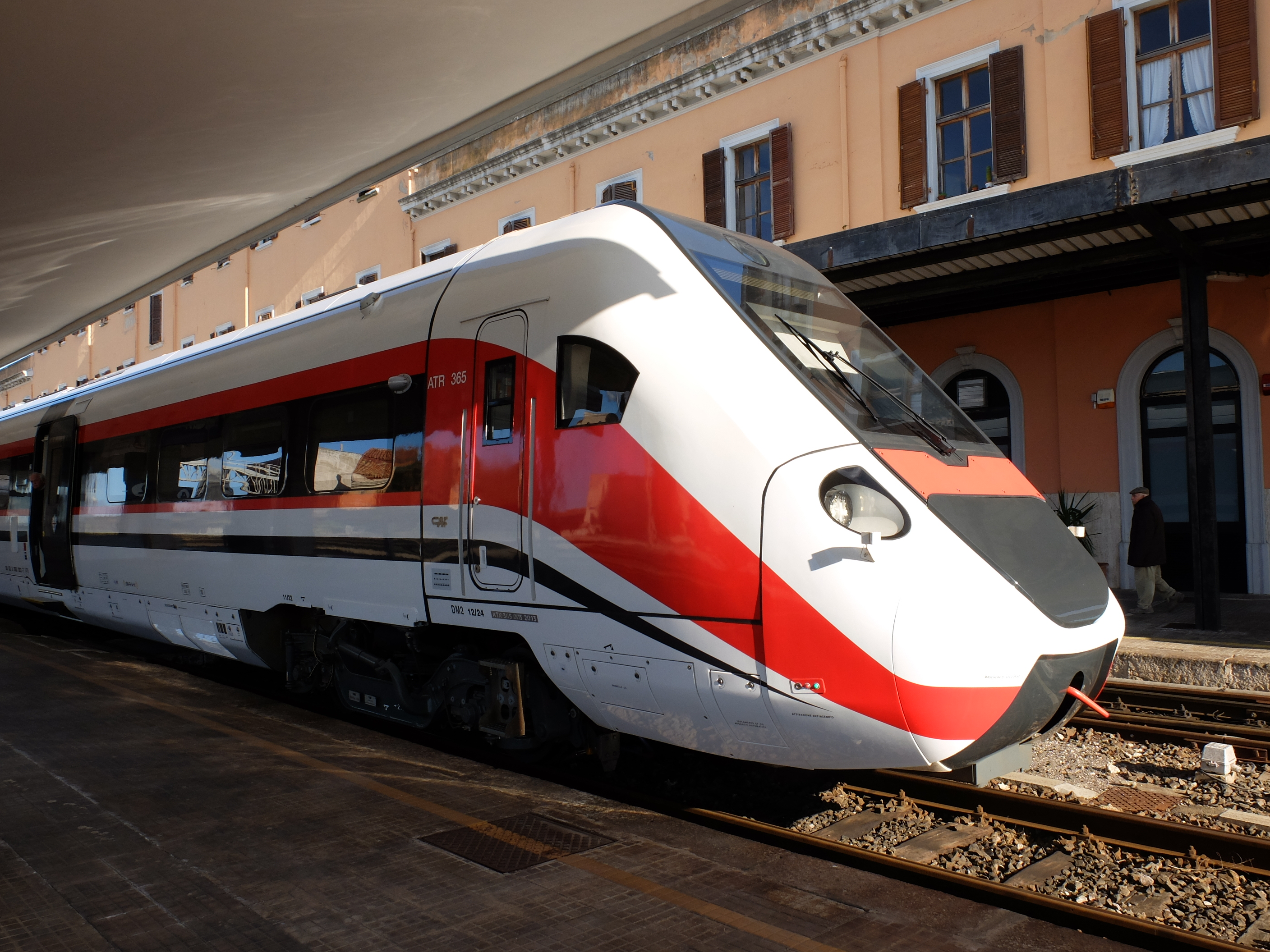
ATR 365 train at Sassari station

== See also ==
- Sassari Tram-train
- Railway stations in Italy
- List of railway stations in Sardinia
- Rail transport in Italy
- History of rail transport in Italy
