= Mandas–Arbatax railway =

Overview
- Locale: Sardinia, Italy
- Termini: Mandas; Arbatax

Technical
- Track gauge: 950 mm (3 ft 1 3/8 in)

The Mandas–Arbatax railway (Italian: Ferrovia Mandas-Arbatax) is a tourist railway line with a narrow gauge in Sardinia, managed by ARST as part of the Trenino Verde service. It is the longest tourist railway in Italy, as well as the longest narrow gauge line in Europe.

== History ==
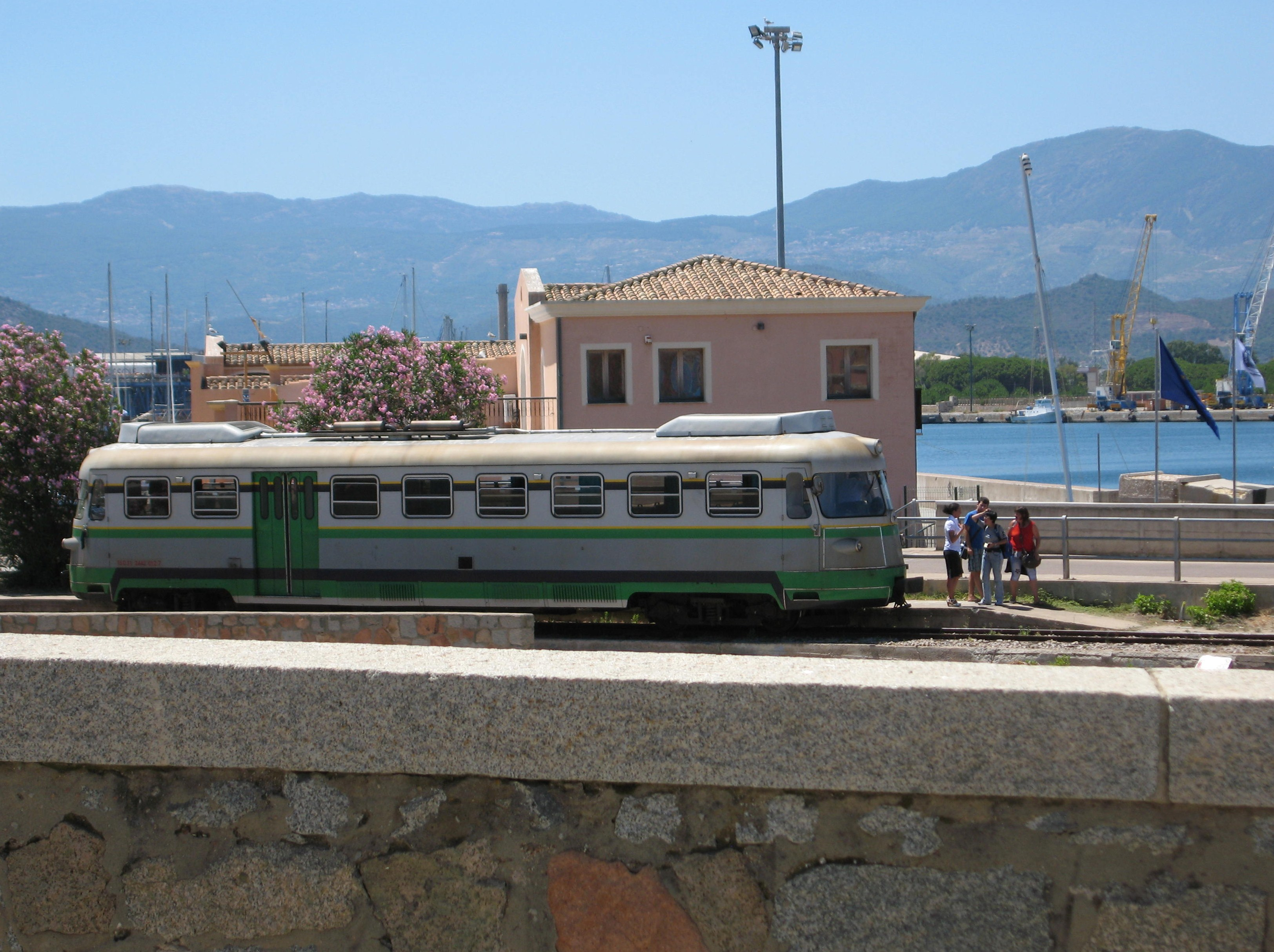
Railcar ADe used for a tourist convoy stopped at the Arbatax station

Since December 2018, a project has been under consideration, based on a proposal from the tourism tour operator Sardaigne en liberté, to use some sections of the railway also with velorails, while still giving priority to traditional railway activities.

The opening of the Arbatax-Lanusei route only was confirmed for Summer 2026.

== Bibliography ==
- Edoardo Altara (1992). Binari a Golfo Aranci - Ferrovie e treni in Sardegna dal 1874 ad oggi. Ermanno Albertelli Editore. ISBN 88-85909-31-0.
- Alessandro Boccone. Il Trenino Verde della Sardegna: da Mandas ad Arbatax. Edisar Editori.
- Alessandro Boccone. Il Trenino Verde della Sardegna: linea Arbatax-Mandas-Sorgono. Zonza Editori.
- Elettrio Corda (1984). Le contrastate vaporiere - 1864/1984: 120 anni di vicende delle strade ferrate sarde: dalle reali alle secondarie, dalle complementari alle statali. Chiarella.
- Francesco Ogliari (1978). La sospirata rete. Milano: Cavallotti Editori.
- Fernando Pilia (1994). Il Trenino Verde della Sardegna - Un secolo di storia tra pionieri, banditi, letterati e turisti. Silvana Editoriale. ISBN 88-366-0474-9.
- Paolo Rumiz (2009). L'Italia in seconda classe. Feltrinelli. ISBN 978-88-07-71102-2.
- Paolo Solinas (1998). La Sardegna con il Trenino Verde: Le ferrovie complementari. Maggioli Editore. ISBN 88-387-9774-9.
- Il Trenino Verde della Sardegna - Catalogo dei viaggi (edizione 2008 ed.). Ferrovie della Sardegna.
- Francesco Cannas. "La Mandas-Arbatax". Ilmondodeitreni.it.
