= Macomer–Bosa railway =

Overview
- Locale: Sardinia, Italy
- Termini: Macomer; Bosa

Service
- Operator: ARST

History
- Opened: 26 December 1888
- Closed: 14 June 1981
- Reopened: 10 May 1995 (Tresnuraghes-Bosa Marina)

Technical
- Track gauge: 950 mm (3 ft 1 3/8 in)

The Macomer–Bosa railway (Italian: ferrovia Macomer-Bosa) is a heritage railway with narrow gauge in Sardinia, operated by ARST within the service of Trenino Verde. However, since 1995 the line has ended at the Bosa Marina station, as the route between this station and that of Bosa is no longer passable.

== History ==
The construction of the railway, originally 48 km long and designed as a single track with a 950 mm gauge and steam traction, was completed in 1888, and on 26 December of that year the first trains passed on the line, which a few years later was connected to the Cagliari-Golfo Aranci line of the Royal Railways as the Macomer-Nuoro line, thanks to the construction of a connection between the two Macomer stations. The original route of the line was modified a few decades later, in fact already in the 1910s a variant was built between the Modolo and Bosa railway stations, which allowed trains to pass through the coastal hamlet of Bosa Marina. The variant was opened to traffic in May 1915.

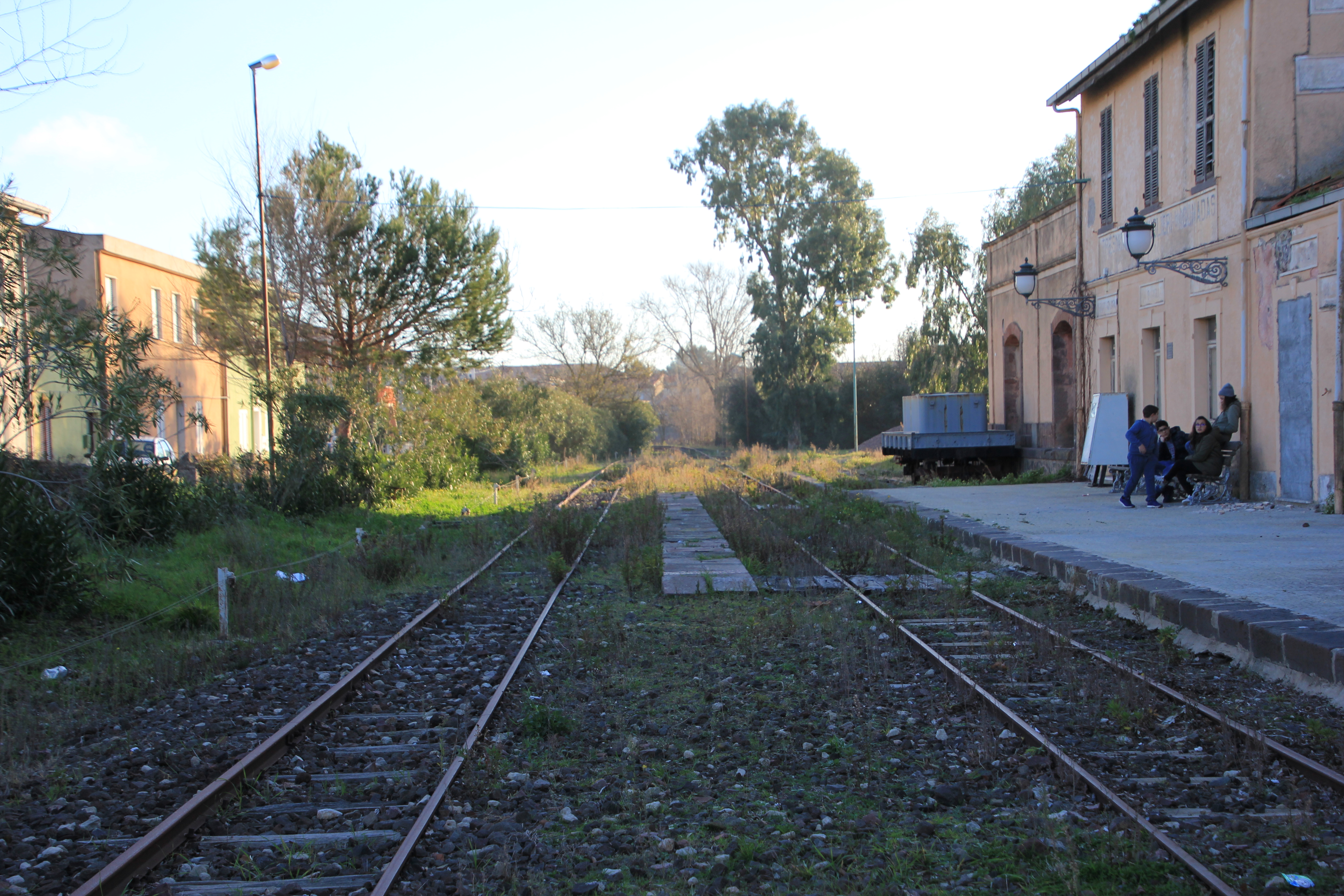
The Tresnuraghes-Cuglieri-Magomadas station served as the railway's terminus from 1982 to 1995 and remained the terminus for public transport services along the line until they ceased in 1997.

== Traffic ==
In addition to scheduled trips, it is also possible to travel along the line by reservation by tourists during any period of the year, with the possibility of choosing the rolling stock and customising timetables, routes and stops.
