= Trenino Verde =

Railway line in Italy

Overview
- Service type: Tourist train
- Status: Operational
- Locale: Sardinia, Italy
- Current operator: ARST
- Website: Trenino Verde

Route
- Lines used: Isili–Sorgono; Mandas–Arbatax; Macomer–Bosa Marina; Nulvi–Tempio–Palau
Route map
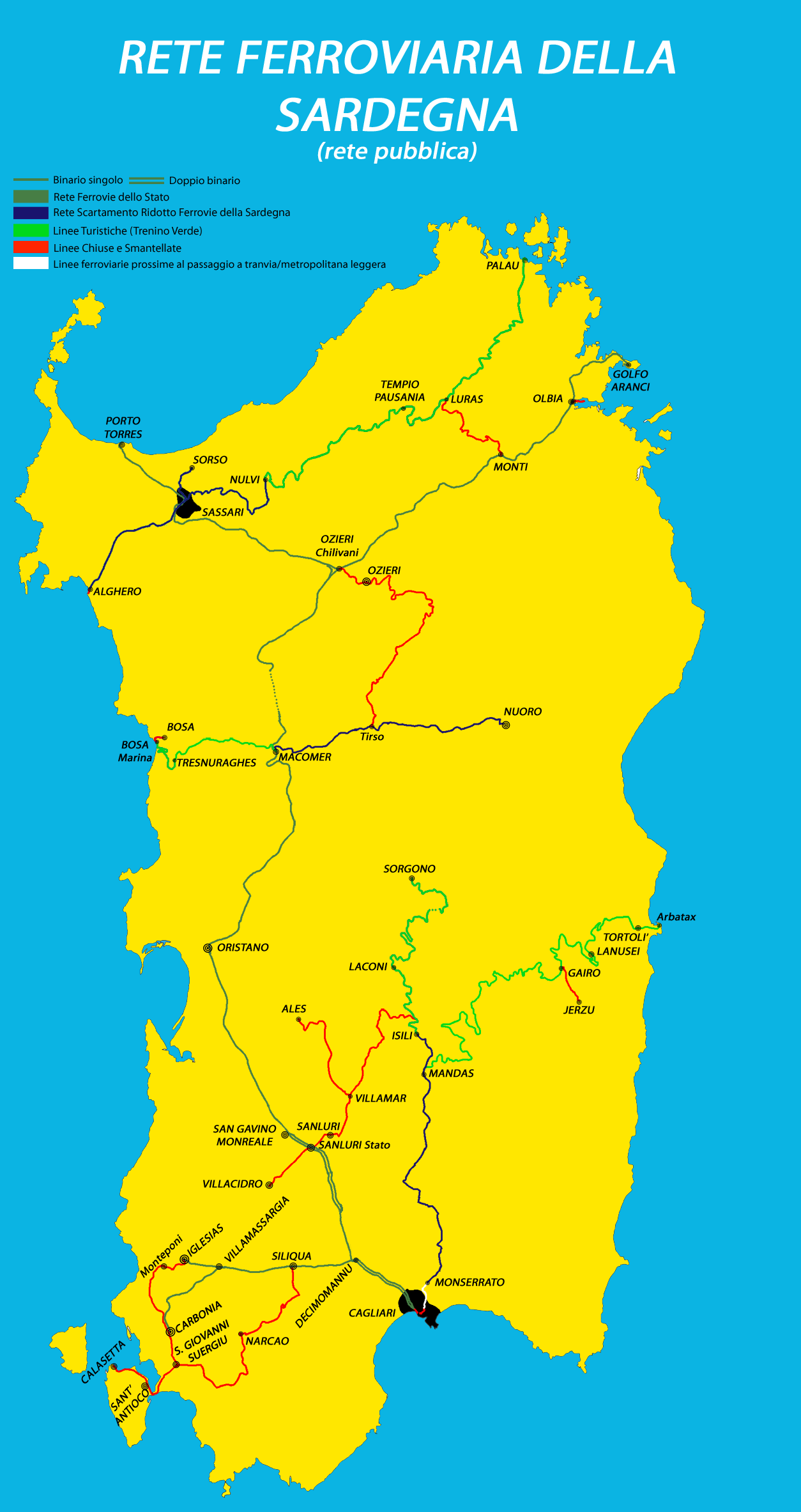
- Map of the Sardinian rail network showing the Trenino Verde lines in light green.

Il Trenino Verde della Sardegna ("the Little Green Train of Sardinia" in English) is a rail tourism service operated by ARST in the island of Sardinia, Italy.

== History ==
Characterized by lengthy travel times and winding tracks in attractive landscapes, the narrow gauge railways of Sardinia have always attracted the attention of travellers. As early as 1921, the British writer D. H. Lawrence, in his book, Sea and Sardinia, recounted his experiences while traveling along the Cagliari–Isili line:

We'll take the secondary train, … wherever it goes.

— D. H. Lawrence, Sea and Sardinia, 1921.

After World War II, railway tourism slowly took shape on the island. By the 1980s, the then concessionaires of the secondary lines, the Ferrovie Complementari della Sardegna (FCS) and the Strade Ferrate Sarde (SFS), were forced to organise a service for tourists in a more systematic fashion. The name chosen for it, Trenino Verde, was used for the first time in 1984, and alludes to the many features rich in vegetation encountered by the trains.

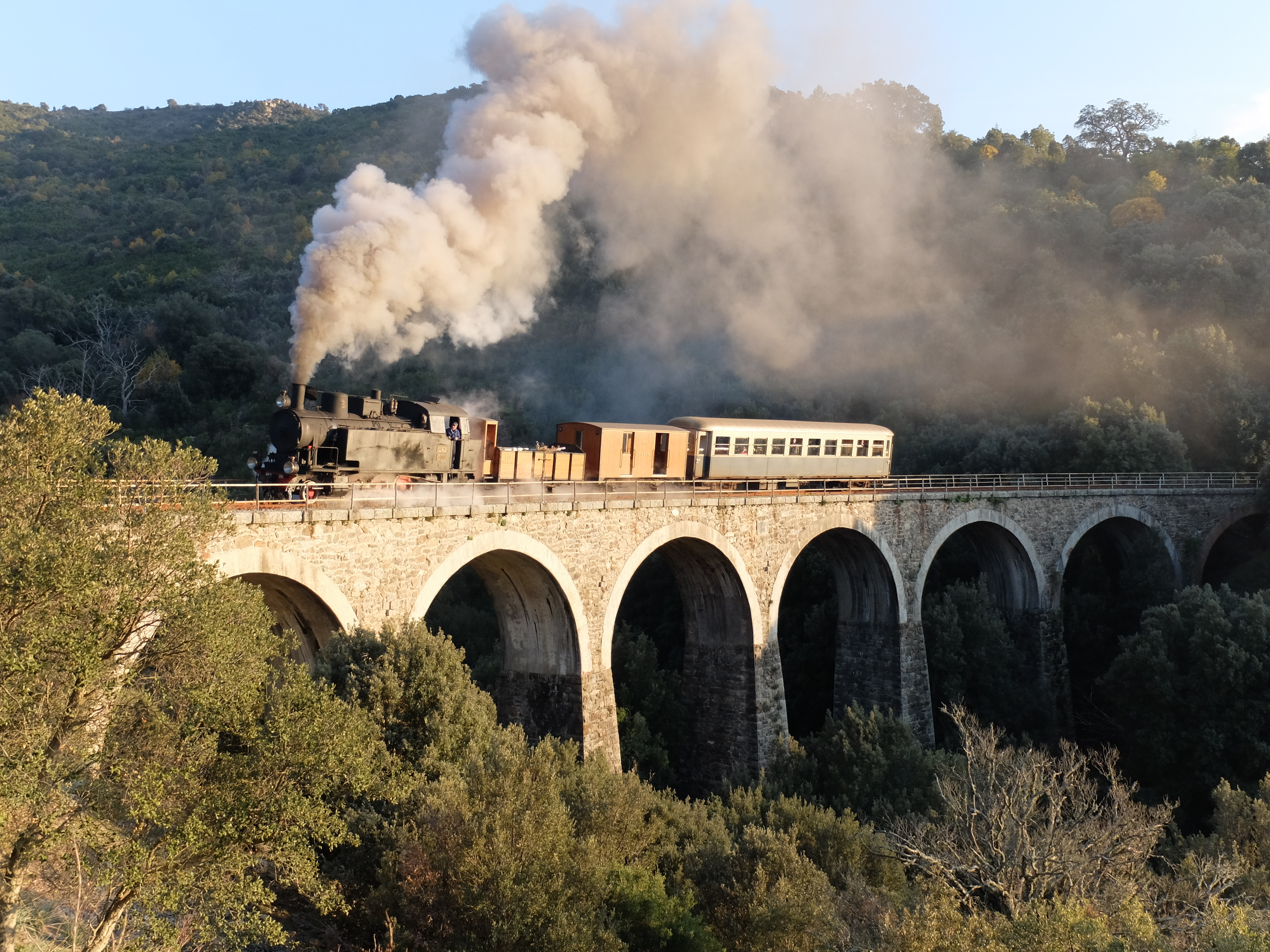
Isili-Sorgono Line between Aritzo and Belvì

Given the growing demand for rail tourism, the Ferrovie della Sardegna (FdS) (created in 1989 from the merger of the FCS and the SFS), with the support of Ente Sardo Industrie Turistiche (ESIT), the World Wide Fund for Nature, and Italia Nostra, later obtained funding from the Region and the European Union to achieve a leap in the quality of the service. The funding was spent on the restoration of steam locomotives, vintage carriages, stations and sections of line.

On 10 May 1995, 14 years after its closure, the restored Tresnuraghes–Bosa Marina line was reopened to rail traffic, in the form of Trenino Verde services, thus becoming the first tourist-train-only line in Sardinia. Two years later, on 16 June 1997, four of the FdS lines, the Mandas–Arbatax line, the Isili–Sorgono line, the Macomer–Tresnuraghes line and the Nulvi–Tempio–Palau line, were closed to ordinary traffic and converted to tourist train lines. Additionally, two themed museums were opened as part of the Trenino Verde project, on premises adjacent to the Monserrato railway station and Tempio Pausania railway stations.

In 2010, with the integration of ARST Gestione FdS (the name assumed by the FdS in 2008) into the ARST, the latter company inherited responsibility for the management of Sardinia's narrow gauge railways, including those of the Trenino Verde.

== Lines ==
The Trenino Verde currently operates over the following 404 km (251 mi) long network of lines used exclusively for tourism purposes:

=== Cagliari division ===
- Isili–Sorgono (83 km (52 mi))
- Mandas–Arbatax (159 km (99 mi))

=== Sassari-Macomer division ===
- Macomer–Bosa Marina (46 km (29 mi))
- Nulvi–Tempio–Palau (116 km (72 mi))

These lines are used all year round for chartered trains, operating customised itineraries. In summer, there is also a regularly scheduled service.

== See also ==
- History of rail transport in Italy
- List of railway stations in Sardinia
- Rail transport in Italy
- IT.A.CÀ - Festival of Responsible Tourism
