= List of railway stations in Sardinia =

This is the list of railway stations in Sardinia owned by:

- Rete Ferroviaria Italiana (RFI), a branch of the Italian state company Ferrovie dello Stato;
- Azienda Regionale Sarda Trasporti (ARST).

== RFI stations ==
| Station | Locality | Province | Category |
|---|---|---|---|
| Abbasanta | Abbasanta | Oristano | Silver |
| Assemini | Assemini | Cagliari | Silver |
| Assemini Carmine | Assemini | Cagliari | Bronze |
| Assemini Santa Lucia | Assemini | Cagliari | Bronze |
| Berchidda | Berchidda | Olbia-Tempio | Silver |
| Bonorva | Bonorva | Sassari | Bronze |
| Borore | Borore | Nuoro | Bronze |
| Cagliari | Cagliari | Cagliari | Gold |
| Cagliari Elmas | Elmas | Cagliari | Bronze |
| Cagliari Santa Gilla | Cagliari | Cagliari | Silver |
| Cala Sabina | Cala Sabina | Olbia-Tempio | Bronze |
| Carbonia Stato | Carbonia | Cagliari | Silver |
| Decimomannu | Decimomannu | Cagliari | Silver |
| Elmas Aeroporto | Elmas | Cagliari | Silver |
| Giave | Giave | Sassari | Bronze |
| Golfo Aranci | Golfo Aranci | Olbia-Tempio | Silver |
| Iglesias | Iglesias | Cagliari | Silver |
| Macomer | Macomer | Nuoro | Silver |
| Marinella | Golfo Aranci | Olbia-Tempio | Bronze |
| Marrubiu-Terralba-Arborea | Marrubiu | Oristano | Silver |
| Monti-Telti | Monti | Olbia-Tempio | Silver |
| Olbia | Olbia | Olbia-Tempio | Silver |
| Oristano | Oristano | Oristano | Silver |
| Oschiri | Oschiri | Olbia-Tempio | Silver |
| Ozieri-Chilivani | Ozieri | Sassari | Silver |
| Pabillonis | Pabillonis | Medio Campidano | Bronze |
| Paulilatino | Paulilatino | Oristano | Bronze |
| Ploaghe | Ploaghe | Sassari | Bronze |
| Porto Torres | Porto Torres | Sassari | Bronze |
| Porto Torres Marittima | Porto Torres | Sassari | Bronze |
| Rudalza | Rudalza | Olbia-Tempio | Bronze |
| San Gavino | San Gavino Monreale | Medio Campidano | Silver |
| Samassi-Serrenti | Samassi | Medio Campidano | Silver |
| Sanluri Stato | Sanluri | Medio Campidano | Bronze |
| Sassari | Sassari | Sassari | Silver |
| Serramanna-Nuraminis | Serramanna | Medio Campidano | Silver |
| Siliqua | Siliqua | Cagliari | Silver |
| Solarussa | Solarussa | Oristano | Bronze |
| Su Canale | Su Canale | Olbia-Tempio | Bronze |
| Uras-Mogoro | Uras | Oristano | Bronze |
| Villamassargia-Domusnovas | Villamassargia | Cagliari | Silver |
| Villasor | Villasor | Cagliari | Silver |
| Villaspeciosa-Uta | Villaspeciosa | Cagliari | Silver |

== ARST stations ==
| Station | Locality | Province |
|---|---|---|
| Alghero | Alghero | Sassari |
| Arcone | Sassari | Sassari |
| Barrali | Barrali | Sud Sardegna |
| Birori | Birori | Nuoro |
| Bolotana | Bolotana | Nuoro |
| Bortigali | Bortigali | Nuoro |
| Crabulazzi | Sassari | Sassari |
| Dolianova | Dolianova | Sud Sardegna |
| Dolianova (fermata) | Dolianova | Sud Sardegna |
| Donori | Donori | Sud Sardegna |
| Funtana Niedda | Sorso | Sassari |
| Gesico | Suelli | Sud Sardegna |
| Iscra | Illorai | Sassari |
| Isili | Isili | Sud Sardegna |
| Lei | Lei | Nuoro |
| Macomer (ARST) | Macomer | Nuoro |
| Mamuntanas | Alghero | Sassari |
| Mandas | Mandas | Sud Sardegna |
| Molafà | Sassari | Sassari |
| Monserrato | Monserrato | Cagliari |
| Nuoro | Nuoro | Nuoro |
| Olmedo | Sassari | Sassari |
| Oniferi | Oniferi | Nuoro |
| Orotelli | Orotelli | Nuoro |
| Prato Sardo | Nuoro | Nuoro |
| Punta Moro | Alghero | Sassari |
| Rodda Quadda | Sassari | Sassari |
| Santa Maria di Pisa | Sassari | Sassari |
| San Giorgio | Usini | Sassari |
| Sassari Santa Maria | Sassari | Sassari |
| Senorbì | Senorbì | Sud Sardegna |
| Senorbì (fermata) | Senorbì | Sud Sardegna |
| Serri | Serri | Sud Sardegna |
| Settimo San Pietro | Settimo San Pietro | Cagliari |
| Silanus | Silanus | Nuoro |
| Soleminis | Soleminis | Sud Sardegna |
| Sorso | Sorso | Sassari |
| Suelli | Suelli | Sud Sardegna |
| Tirso | Illorai | Sassari |

== See also ==
- Railway stations in Italy
- Ferrovie dello Stato
- Rail transport in Italy
- High-speed rail in Italy
- Transport in Italy
- Trenino Verde
