= Olbia railway station =

Railway station in Sardinia, Italy

Olbia
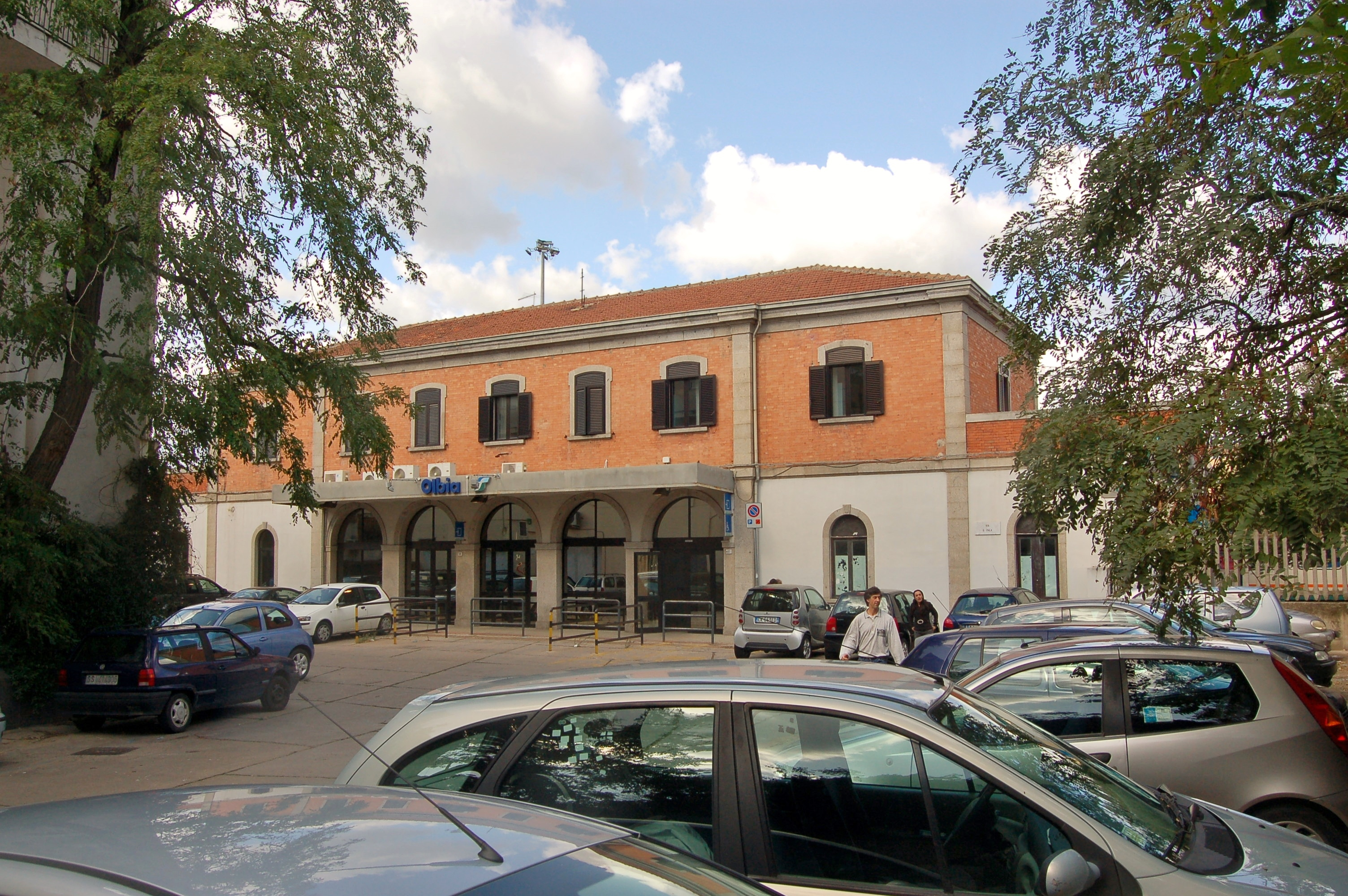
- View of the passenger building.

General information
- Location: Via Giacomo Pala; 07026 Olbia OT; Olbia, Olbia-Tempio, Sardinia; Italy
- Coordinates: 40°55′29″N 09°29′55″E
- Operator: Rete Ferroviaria Italiana
- Line: Cagliari–Golfo Aranci
- Distance: 283.826 km (176.361 mi) from Cagliari
- Train operators: Trenitalia
- Connections: Urban and suburban buses

Other information
- Classification: Silver

History
- Opened: 15 March 1881; 145 years ago
Location
- Location within Sardinia

Olbia railway station (Italian: Stazione di Olbia) serves the town and comune of Olbia, in the northeast of the island and region of Sardinia, Italy. Opened in 1881, it forms part of the Cagliari–Golfo Aranci railway, the main railway line in Sardinia.

Between 1883 and 2000, the station was also the junction of a short branch line to Olbia's ferry pier, at Isola Bianca.

The station is currently managed by Rete Ferroviaria Italiana (RFI). Train services to and from the station are operated by Trenitalia. Each of these companies is a subsidiary of Ferrovie dello Stato (FS), Italy's state-owned rail company.

== Location ==
Olbia railway station is situated in Via Giacomo Pala, at the northwestern edge of the old town.

== History ==
The station was opened on 15 March 1881 as the main station of Terranova Pausania, which was then the name of present-day Olbia. Its opening coincided with the inauguration of the Monti–Terranova Pausania section of the Cagliari–Golfo Aranci railway.

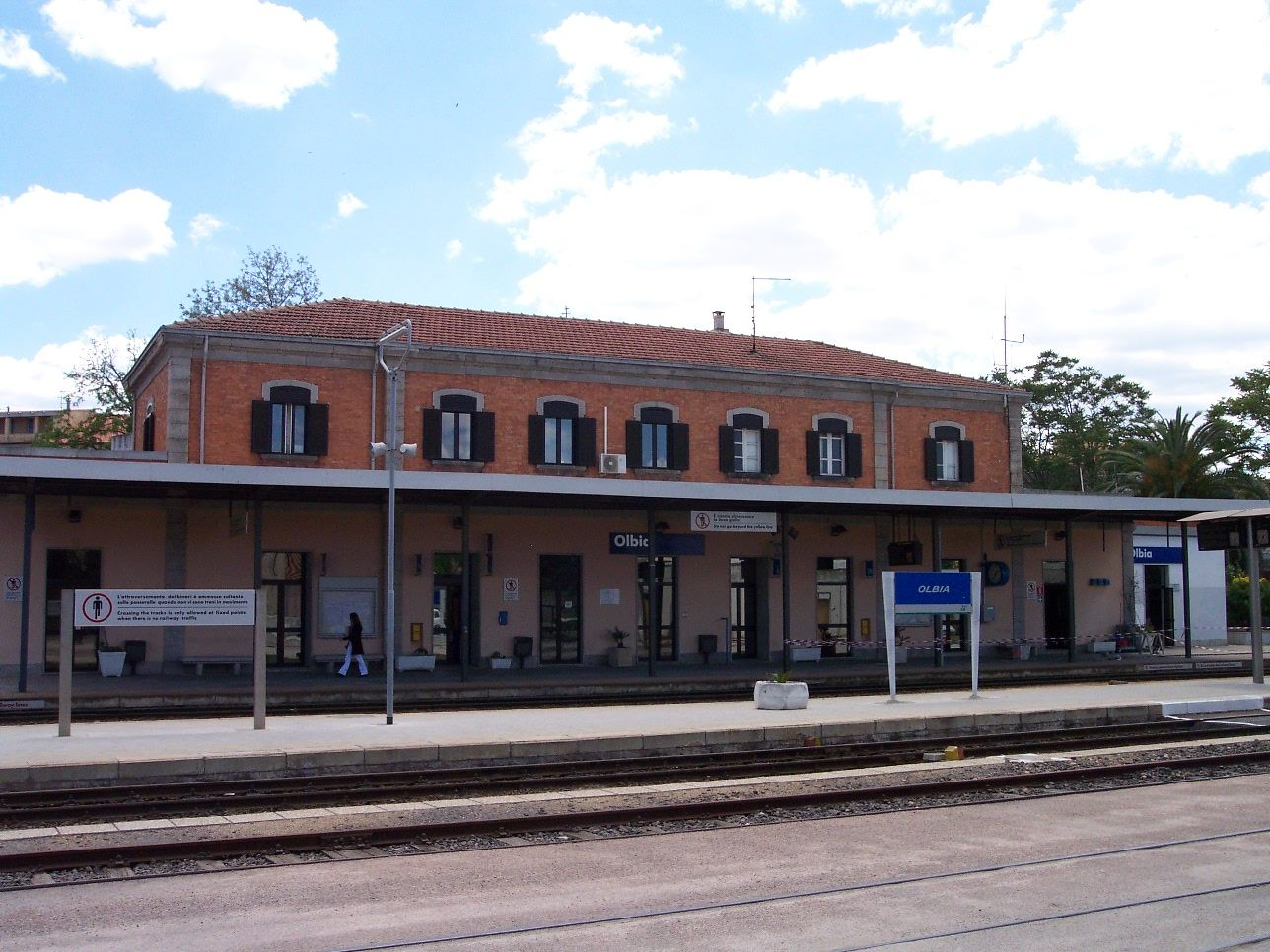
The passenger building viewed from the station yard.

Terranova Pausania was intended to be the penultimate station on the line, which, on 1 May of that year, arrived at the designated terminus of Terranova Isola Bianca, in front of the docks of the town's port. However, in the meantime it had been decided to move the docking of ships passengers to nearby Golfo Aranci, and so the line was extended by constructing a new trunk route from Terranova Pausania.

The extension was opened in 1883. The opening of this route created a bifurcation of the line a short distance from the station. To the west, the new main line continued to Rudalza, another stop within the municipality, and Golfo Aranci, while to the east, the established line, now a branch, headed to Isola Bianca.

A few decades later, the port of Olbia once again became the ferry port. A new rail link from Terranova Pausania station to the new Isola Bianca pier was opened on 28 January 1920, just weeks after responsibility for management of the station had passed to the FS.

The station, which took its present name of Olbia in 1939, continued to be the terminus of most trains in the years to come, including the Freccia Sarda, the Cagliari-Olbia express that for decades linked its termini with the regional capital of Gallura.

In the 1990s, with the closure of the railway station at Olbia Isola Bianca, the branch that led from Olbia station to the ferry terminal and its formation was largely dismantled following work affecting the road network near the port. However, the station at Rudalza remains open.

== Features ==
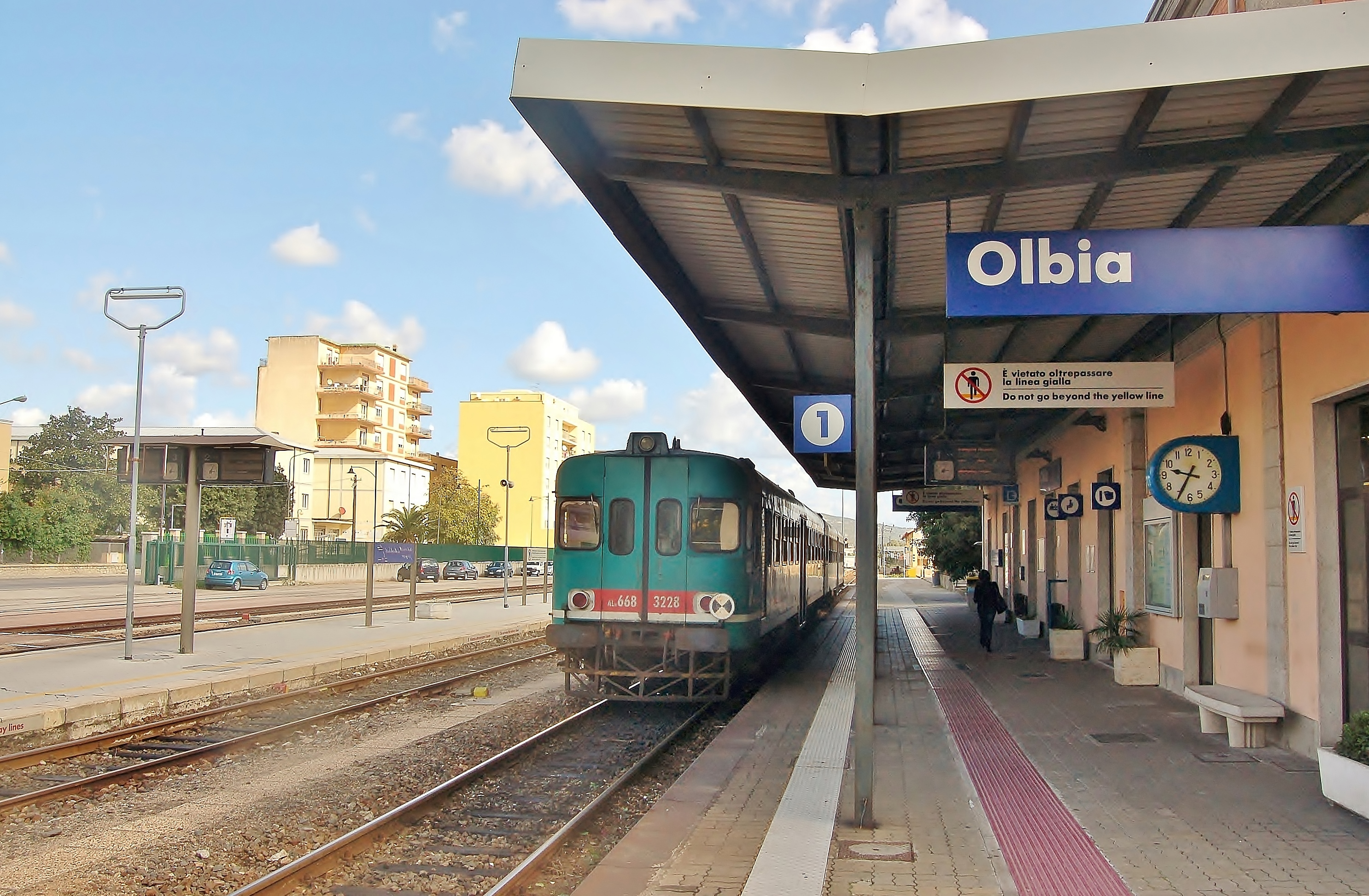
The main platform and station yard.

The passenger building is a two-storey rectangular structure made of red brick, with stone quoins and a tiled roof. Its ground floor exterior has an all round white rendered finish.

The station yard has a track in front of the passenger building, and three other tracks used for passenger services.

About 400 m (1,300 ft) from the passenger building, towards Cagliari, is the station's locomotive depot, adjacent to which is also a group of tracks for freight service.

A new station is expected to be constructed in future near the present freight terminal, to replace the current passenger building.

== Passenger and train movements ==
In 2007, the station had, on average, 442.5 passenger movements each day.

Trains link the station with Cagliari, Oristano, Chilivani, Sassari, Porto Torres and Golfo Aranci.

The station is always attended, and train movements are managed on site by the station manager.

== Interchange ==
An ASPO bus terminal in front of the station provides urban bus links, including Olbia's ferry port at Isola Bianca.

Not far from the station is a bus stop for ARST suburban buses to surrounding areas.

== See also ==
- History of rail transport in Italy
- List of railway stations in Sardinia
- Rail transport in Italy
- Railway stations in Italy
