= ARST (company) =

Transport company in Italy

ARST S.p.A.
- Type: Società per azioni
- Founded: Cagliari, Italy 1971
- Headquarters: Italy
- Area served: Sardinia
- Services: Bus, tram, train
- Owner: Autonomous Region of Sardinia
- Number of employees: 2166
- Website: arst.sardegna.it/index.html

ARST S.p.A., known also as Azienda Regionale Sarda Trasporti, is a public company responsible for public transportation in Sardinia, in Italy, owned by the autonomous regional administration of Sardinia.

The company is headquartered in Cagliari and has 2,166 employees. It operates a large part of the intercity bus lines on the island (it had 175 bus lines and a network of 13,500 km (8,400 mi) in 2007), urban bus lines in six municipalities (Alghero, Carbonia, Iglesias, Macomer, Guspini and Oristano), commuter and urban rail transport on 169 km (105 mi) of narrow gauge railways and on two metrotramways operating in Sassari and Cagliari. ARST operates also 438 km (272 mi) of narrow railways, based on 4 lines, used as a rail tourism service, called Trenino Verde.

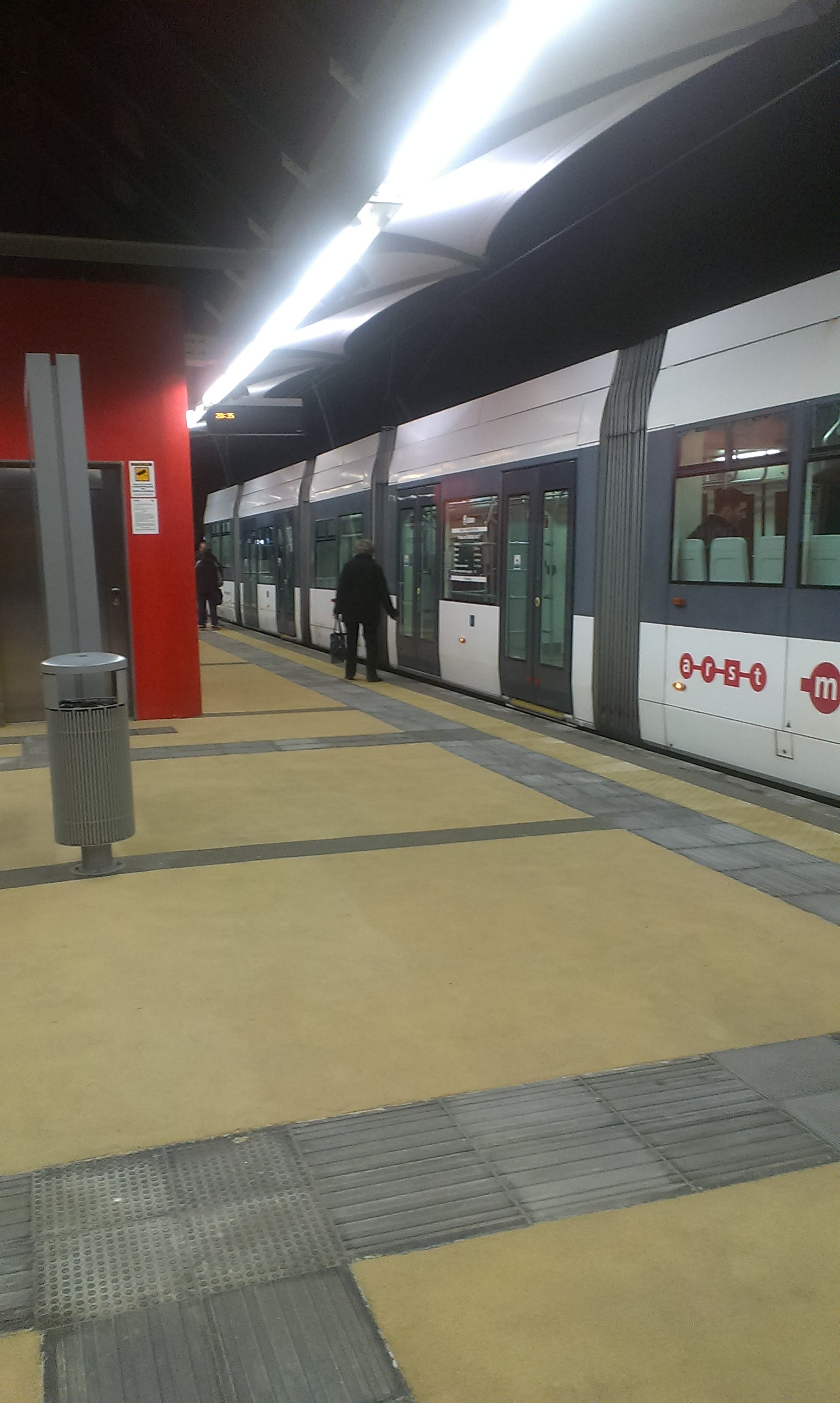
Cagliari Metrotramway

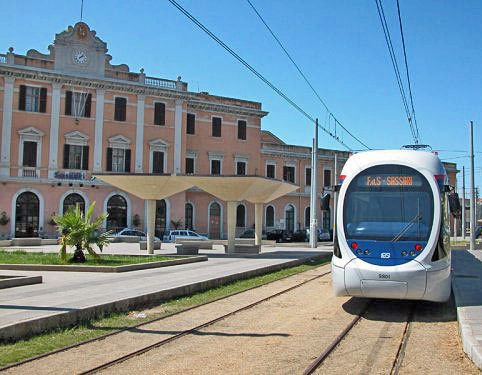
Sassari Metrotramway

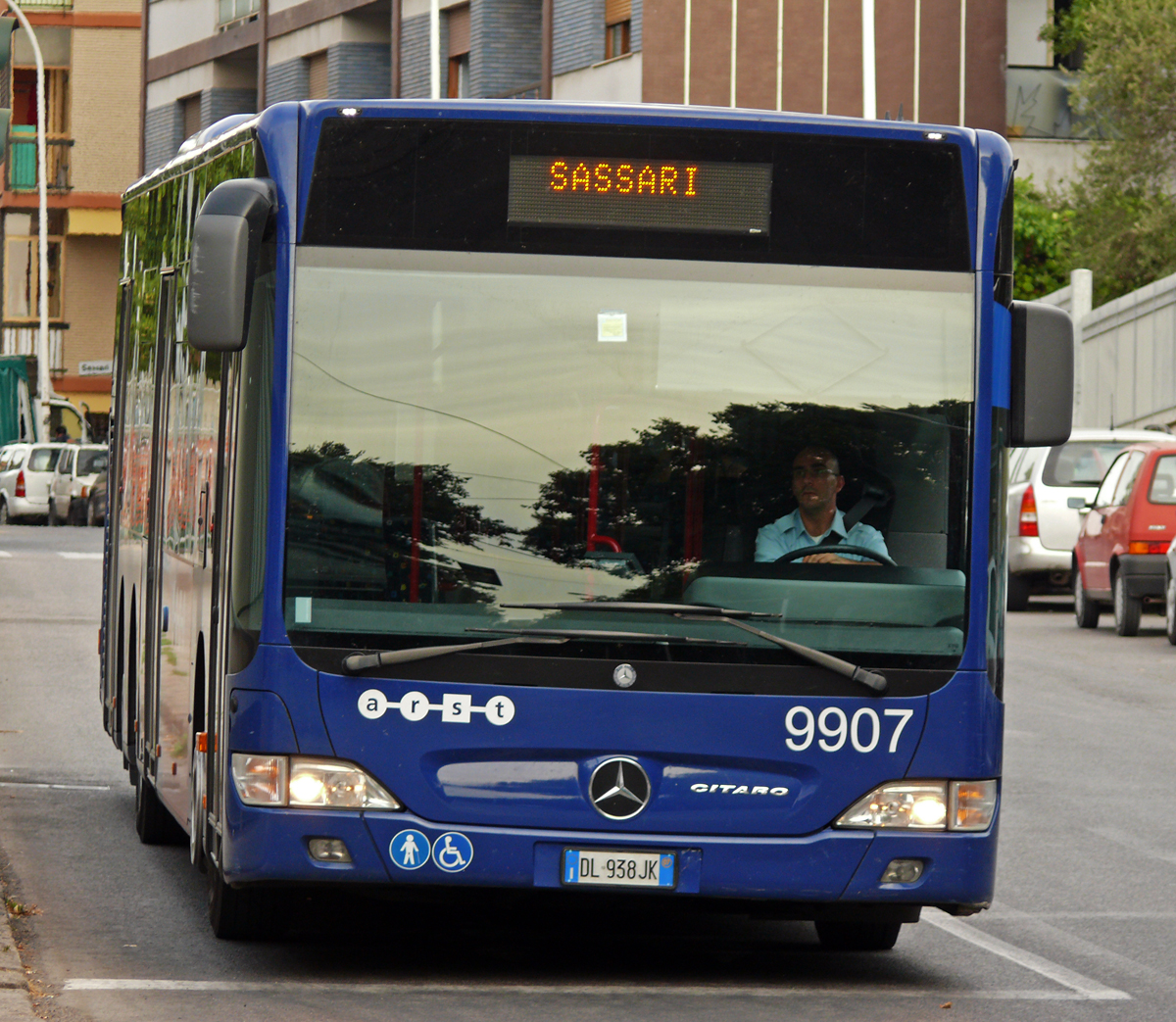
Intercity Bus in Sassari

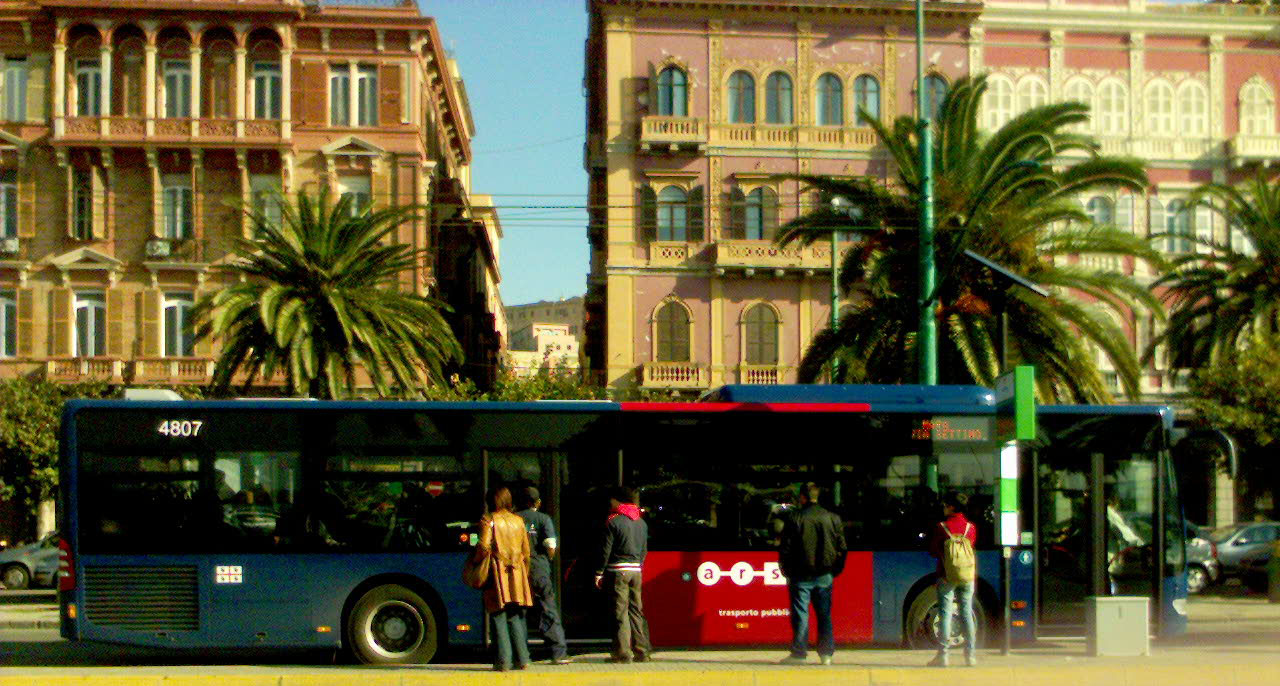
Intercity Bus in Cagliari

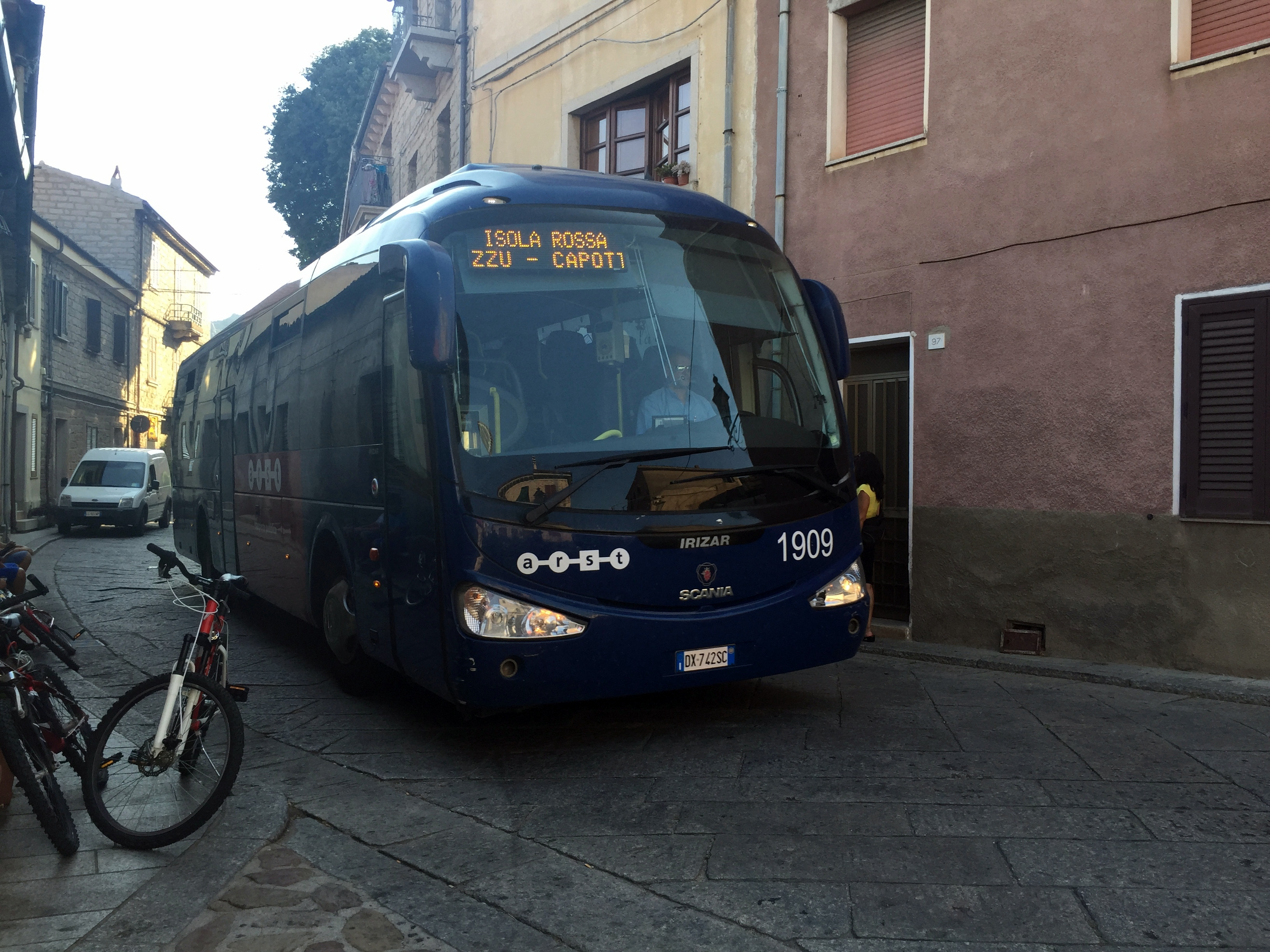
Intercity Bus in Aggius

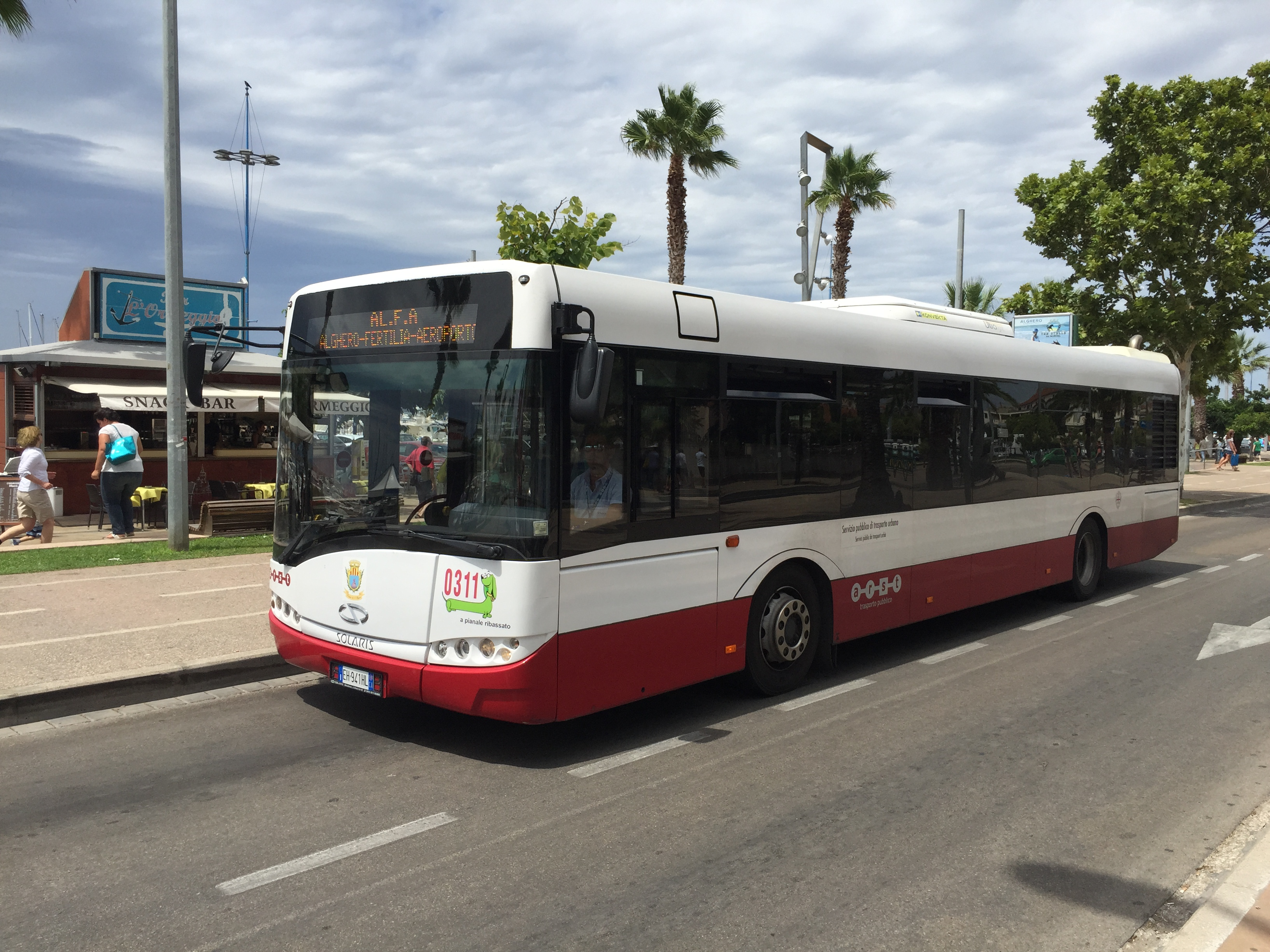
Urban Bus in Alghero

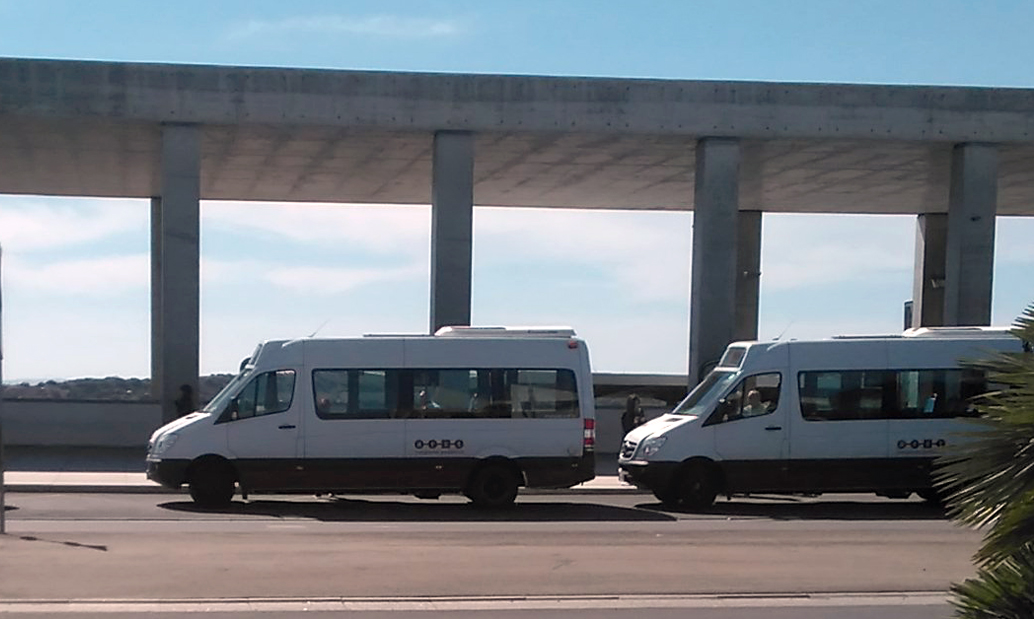
Urban minibuses in Carbonia

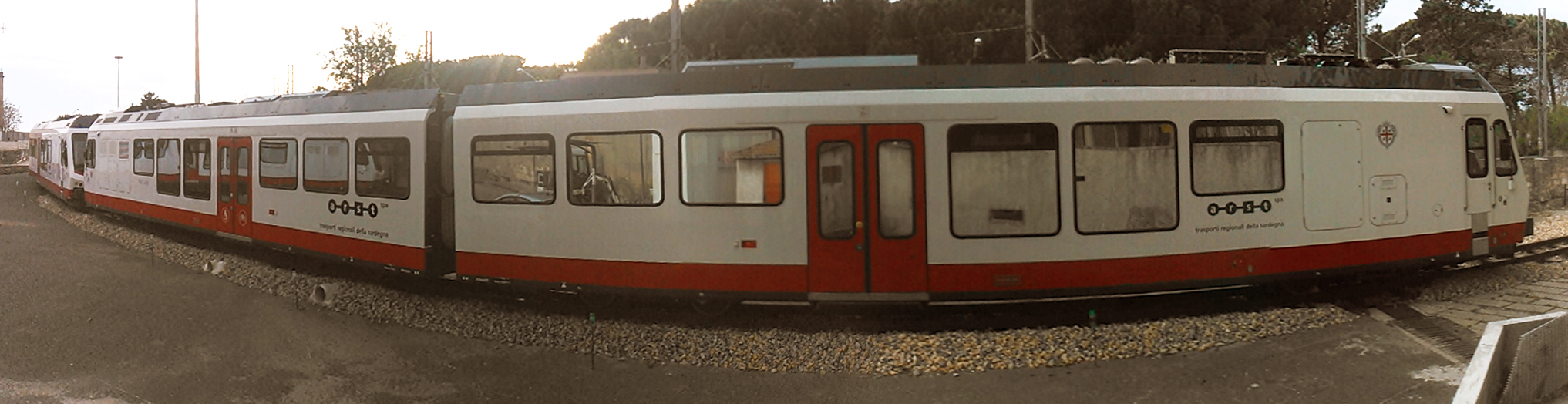
Ades Train in Sassari

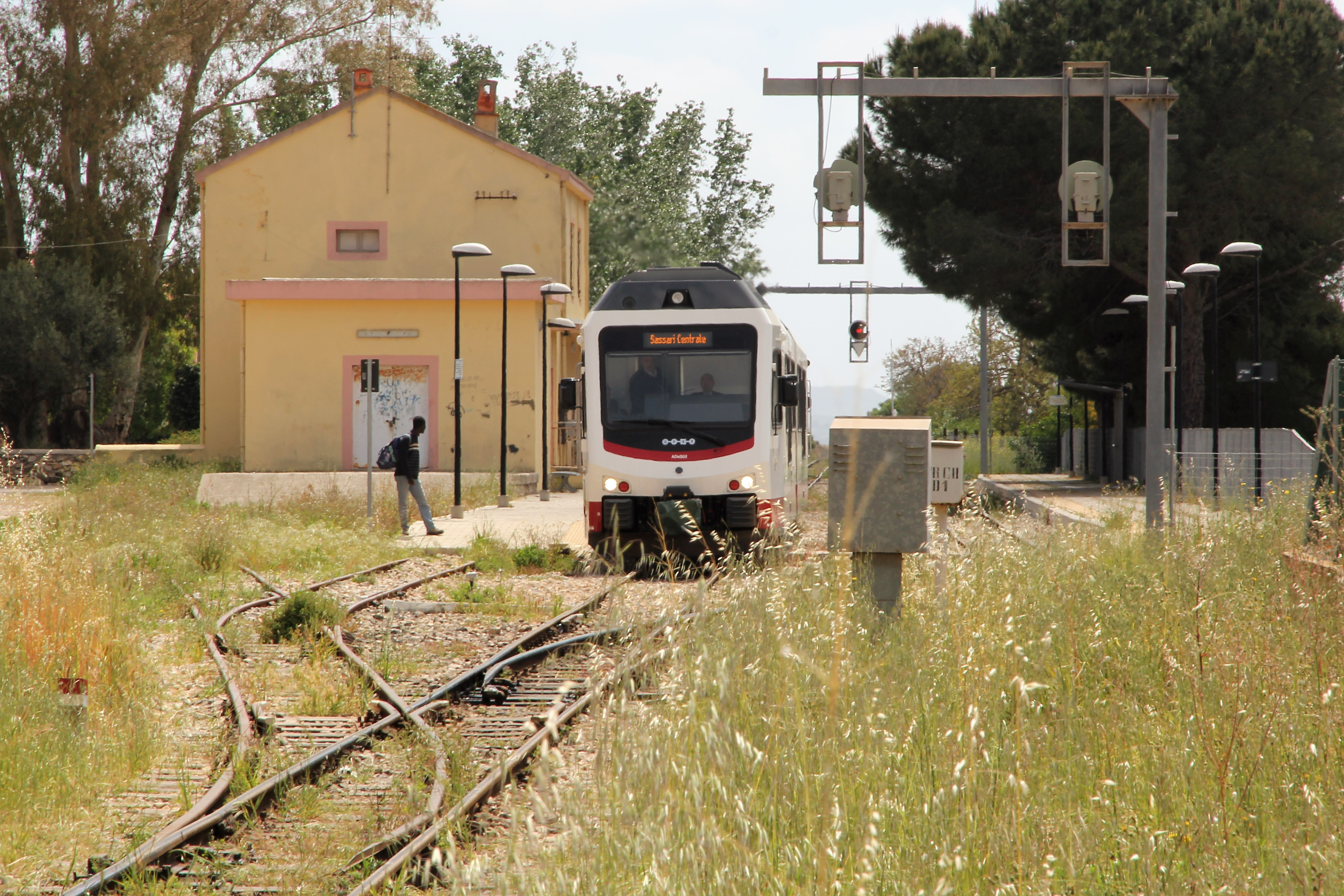
Olmedo's station
