= Metrosassari =

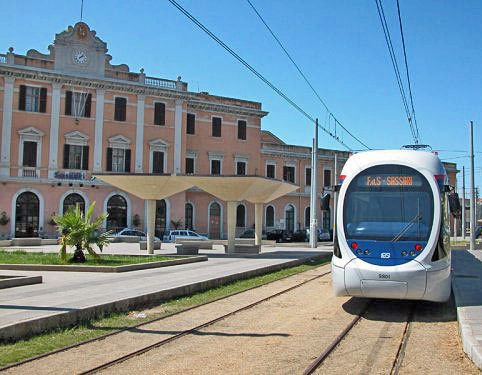
- Metrosassari at railway station

Overview
- Locale: Sassari, Italy
- Transit type: Tram-train
- Number of lines: 1
- Number of stations: 8

Operation
- Began operation: 27 October 2006
- Operator: ARST

Technical
- System length: 4.331 km (2.691 mi)
- No. of tracks: 1
- Track gauge: 950 mm (3 ft 1 3/8 in)
- Minimum radius of curvature: 40 m (130 ft)
- Electrification: 750 Volts DC
System map

Metrosassari, also called Sassari tramway, Sassari tram-train or Sassari metro-tramway (Italian: Metrotranvia di Sassari or Metropolitana leggera di Sassari) is the commercial name of a tram-train line in Sassari, Sardinia, Italy, operated by the regional public transport company ARST (Azienda Regionale Sarda Trasporti).

Despite having been built in the early 2000s, in the urban section the line was built with single track and narrow gauge, to connect with the same 950 mm (3 ft 1 3/8 in) gauge used in the secondary railway lines in Sardinia.

== Rolling stock ==
Tram vehicles were designed by Pininfarina and built by AnsaldoBreda "Sirio ".

== Route ==
The 2.45 km (1.52 mi) tramway part of the line (Stazione - Emiciclo Garibaldi) opened in October 2006, linking the railway station with the city centre via the hospital district.

On 27 September 2009 the line was extended into the peripheral district of Santa Maria di Pisa, running on the electrified portion of the Sassari–Sorso railway.

== Projects ==
The main part of the network is in 2013 in advanced development phase. Currently under construction is the extension of the line from Santa Maria di Pisa to Li Punti and Baldinca, and the electrification of the railway to Sorso, 10 km from Sassari.

It is also planned to convert and electrify the 28 km Sassari-Alghero railway to allow the trams to reach the village of Olmedo, Fertilia Airport and the town of Alghero.

== Bibliography ==
- Gian Guido Turchi: A Sassari arriva il tram. In: ″I Treni″ Nr. 224 (March 2001), p. 14–17.
