= Railways in Sardinia =

Aspect of the Italian island

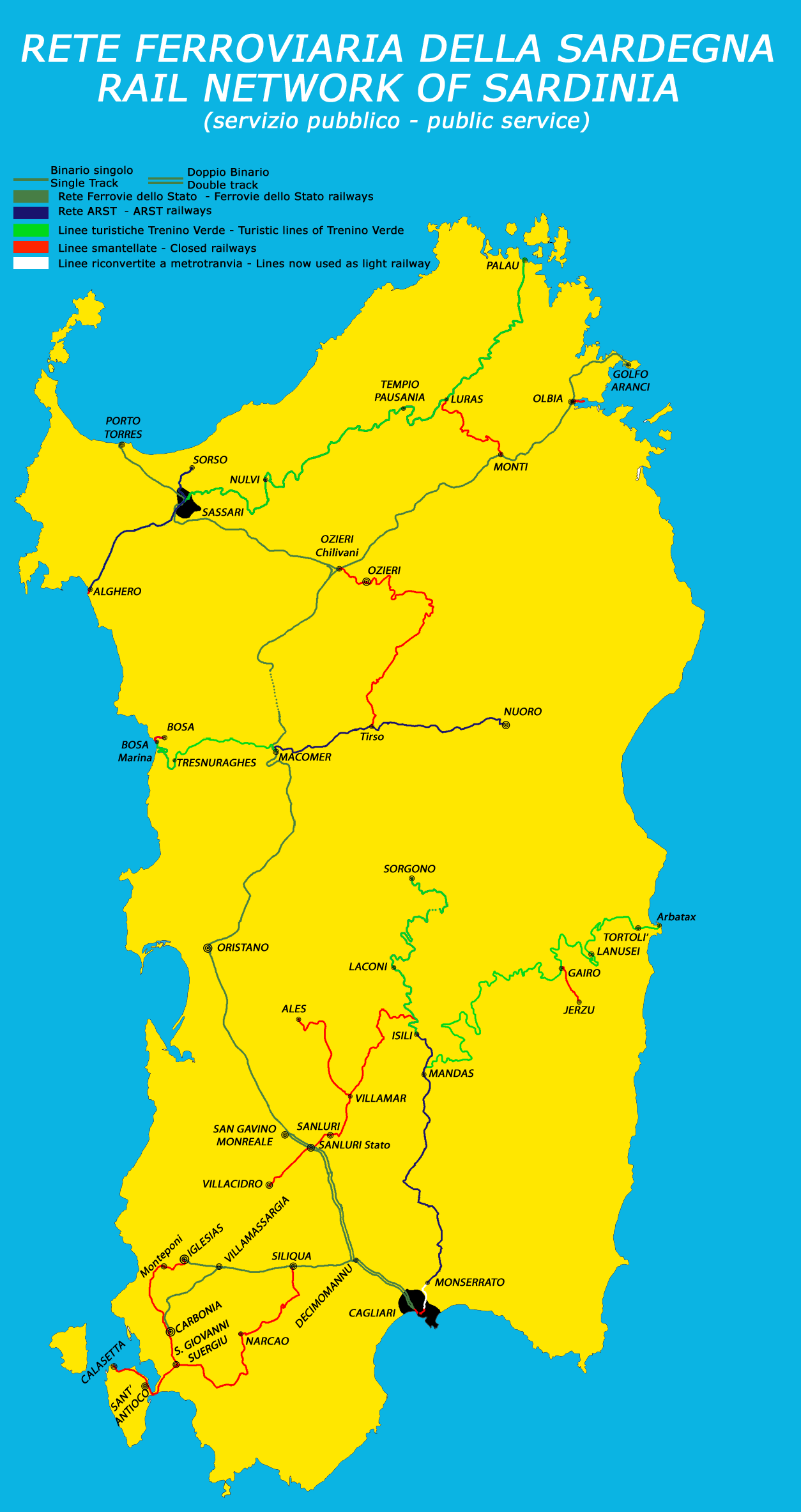
Map of the Sardinian railway network

The railway network of Sardinia includes lines that develop for a total of about 1,038 km in length, of which 430 km with an ordinary gauge and about 608 km narrow gauge (950 mm), with an average density of 43 m of rail per km^{2}, a figure that drops to 25 m/km^{2} considering only public transport lines.

Railway operations on the island are managed by two companies. The first, the Ferrovie dello Stato Italiane group, manages the 4 ordinary gauge railway lines that make up the main network of the island through the subsidiaries RFI and Trenitalia. The remaining 4 sections active in public transport, all narrow gauge, constitute the secondary network, extended by 169 km and entirely managed by ARST Sp A., a transport company wholly owned by the Autonomous Region of Sardinia. This company also controls 438 km of tourist lines, always narrow gauge, active especially in summer and at the request of groups of tourists.

The Sardinian railway network is present in all provinces, even if there are areas without railways. There are also several railways (all narrow gauge) which over the decades have been closed and dismantled.

== History ==
=== The construction of Ferrovie Reali ===
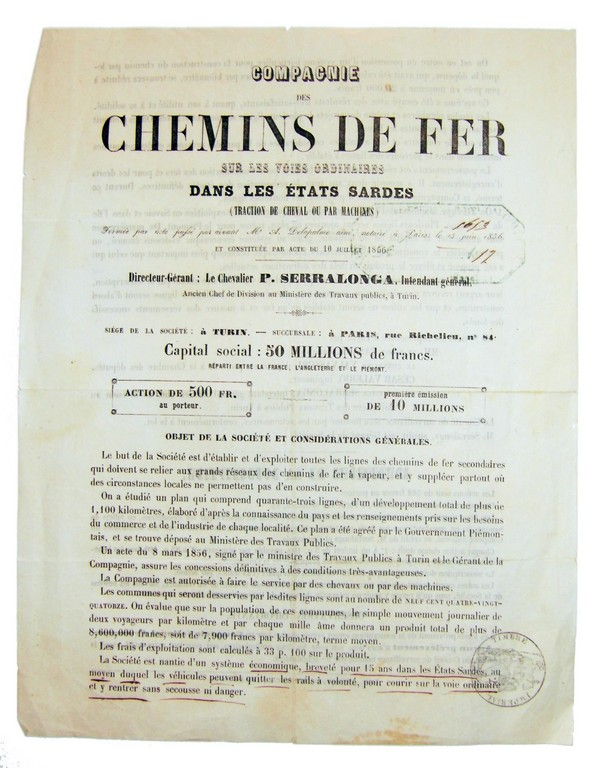
Advertising flyer of the Compagnie des chemins de fer sur les voies ordinate dans les Etats Sardes, established in Turin on 10 July 1856 with a branch in Paris, 1859.

Sardinia, immediately after the Unification of Italy, found itself to be the only territory in the Kingdom without a railway network for public transport: the only lines present were in fact private railways for industrial use. The first railway to enter into operation on the island was the one between the mine of San Leone and the pier of La Maddalena near Capoterra, a line open to traffic in 1862 . The lack of a public railway network led island politicians several times to request government intervention to grant this service also to Sardinia.

After various doubts and objections from national politicians, in 1862 an Italian-English consortium, headed by cavalier Gaetano Semenza, obtained the concession for the construction of the network that would link Cagliari to Iglesias, Porto Torres and Terranova Pausania (in Olbia). The consortium formed the Royal Company of the Sardinian Railways in London, which between studies of the routes, problems of conventions with the State and of various kinds, opened the first stretch of railway (Cagliari- Villasor) in April 1871. The construction of the planned lines, based on a project by the Welsh engineer Benjamin Piercy, ended in 1881, but in the meantime, for the traffic of passengers to the continent, it was decided to use the new maritime docking of Golfo Aranci instead of that of Terranova. The fact made it necessary to build an extension of the railway, which joined the two Gallura ports in 1883.

Sardinia finally had its own railways and, as of December 31, 1899, 30 steam locomotives, 106 carriages, 23 baggage and 436 wagons for freight service were operating on the Royal Railways.

=== The connection of peripheral areas ===
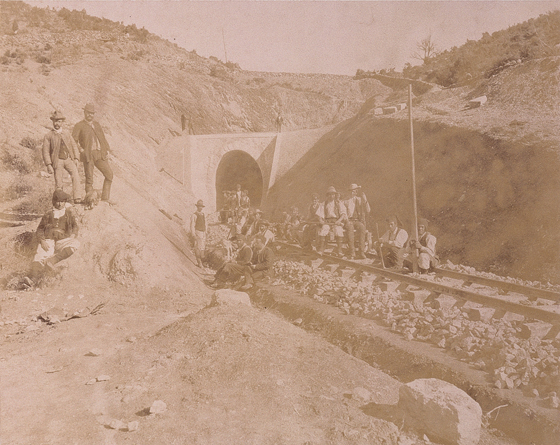
The construction of a tunnel near Meana Sardo, on Isili-Sorgono, in a vintage photo by Vittorio Besso

However, the layout of the Royal Railways network excluded various areas of the island from the possibility of using trains. In fact, many centers complained that they had been cut off from this very important progress in island transport because of the distance from the railway tracks. It was thus decided in 1885, with Law 3011 of March 22 of that year, to grant the possibility of building a secondary network that connected the more isolated centers with the main cities and with the network of the Royal Railways. Given the specific request for an economy construction, it was decided to use a 950 mm track gauge, which would also have helped the engineers in planning the routes in the inaccessible internal areas of Sardinia/

The following year the works were entrusted to the " Italian Society for the Secondary Railways of Sardinia " (SFSS), which, building at a fast pace, inaugurated its first lines after only 17 months. In fact, already on February 15, 1888, the SFSS opened the Cagliari-Isili and the line from Tempio Pausania to the SFSS station in Monti, which borders the homonymous port of the Royal Railways . By the end of the decade they were also inaugurated the dorsal Bosa - Macomer - Nuoro and Sassari-Alghero, while from Isili the railway was extended to arise .

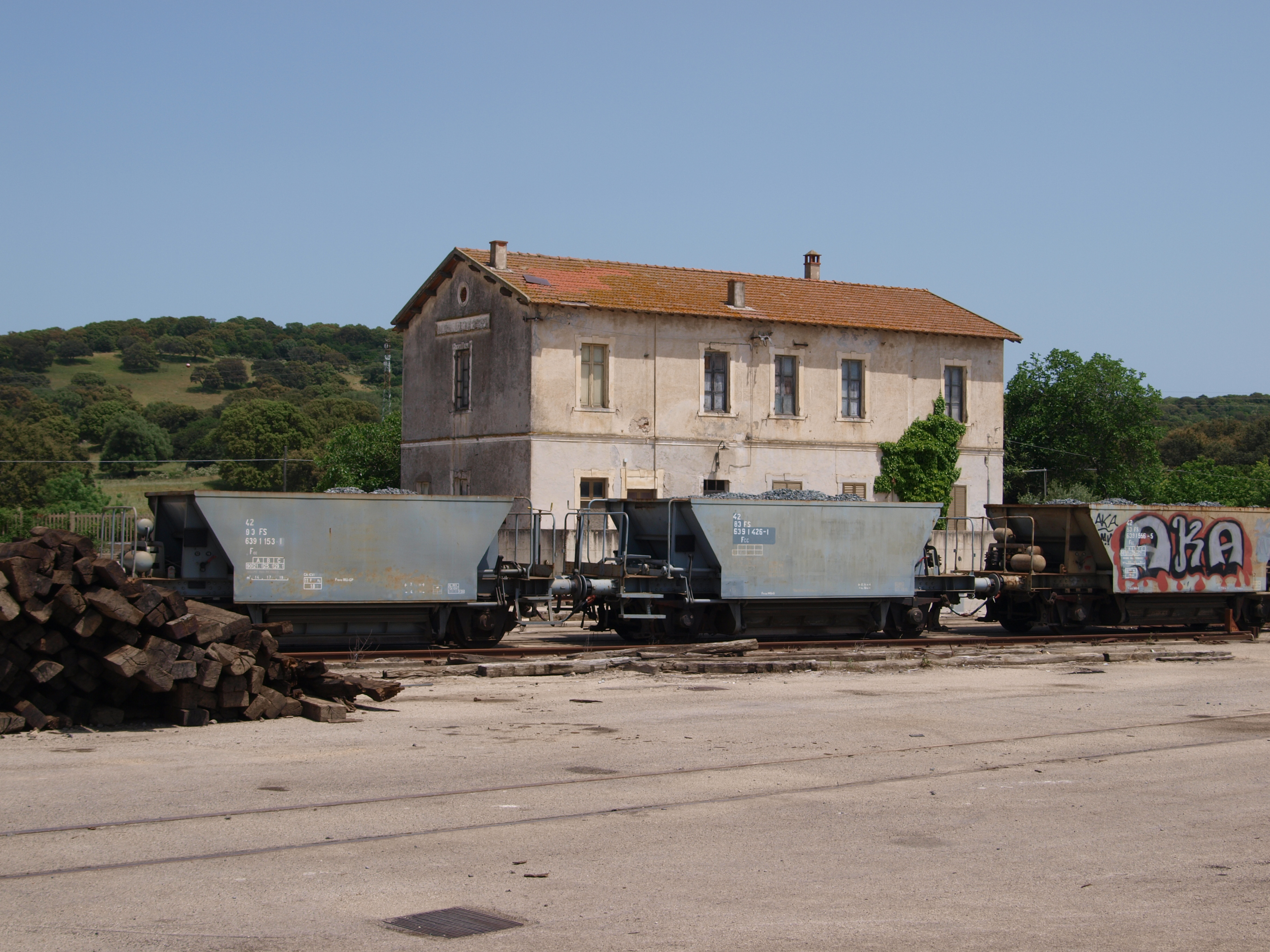
The former station of the SFSS di Monti, seen from the neighboring FS airport . Monti, together with Sassari, Chilivani, Macomer, Sanluri, Iglesias, Siliqua, Carbonia and Cagliari, was an interchange point between the FS network and the public narrow gauge network

Before the end of the century, the Mandas-Arbatax and its Gairo-Jerzu branch were also inaugurated, in addition another link connecting the main and secondary networks was opened to traffic, connecting the Tirso station of Macomer-Nuoro to the strategic Chilivani slipway . In all 590 km of railway track were built, and in many cases the works were completed well in advance, also thanks to the workers who came to build on average 300 meters of line per day. This figure is even more significant if we consider the morphology of the territories where the lines were made and the physical effort that the excavations and drilling in the rock required to the teams of workers.

However, the project was not without criticism from many users, who contested the excessive distance of most of the stations from their respective villages, which was linked to the exploitation of the internal forests of the island, whose valuable timber was transported by the new railway. Furthermore, the average speeds maintained by the SFSS trains, certainly not very high, created some discontent among the passengers.

In 1898, meanwhile, the extension of the ordinary gauge network grew by 6 km, those of the new portion of the railway track open between Iglesias and its hamlet Monteponi, strategically important for the transport of minerals that were extracted in this location and in the surrounding area.

=== From the beginning of the 20th century to WWII ===
Despite the complaints, both networks fully achieved the purpose for which they were born, that is to encourage the transport of people and goods between the various areas of Sardinia, until then only linked to animal traction vehicles. The importance of the railway for the island can be seen from the length of the trips, which were no longer measured in days, but in hours.

In any case, the areas isolated from the railway were still several, and in the years immediately preceding the First World War the regional authorities asked the various mayors for proposals and advice for new railway lines. Among the recommended railways, many were rejected due to lack of funds or uneconomicness. Other lines were planned, such as those of the Sulcis (whose connections at that time were ensured by car transport), but the war forced a postponement of the works, while some proposals for relations in the Sassari area were taken into consideration in the subsequent years.

In those years the only railways to see the light were Isili-Villacidro and its Villamar-Ales branch. The project for the construction of these lines was approved in 1912, and construction was entrusted to the " Society for the Complementary Railways of Sardinia " (FCS). The project also included the use of 5 km of the Isili-Sorgono line, in the stretch between Isili and the Sarcidano station (where the new railway actually started), which led to the common management of this portion of the line with the SFSS. The inauguration of the two lines dates back to June 21, 1915, and the first passengers on the trains were the soldiers leaving for the battlefields of the First World War.

== Network extension ==
Over the years, the Sardinian railway network has remained largely unchanged as a route: not considering the closure of some sections, the only changes to the routes concerned mainly small / medium-sized variants and rectification works to speed up journeys. In any case, the total lack of electrification of the network and the tortuosity of the lines in certain areas mean that the average train speeds are rather low compared to the rest of Italy, which in some cases has compromised the competitiveness of the railway towards bus lines.

Commonly, the Sardinian network is divided into the main ordinary gauge network (that of the FS, managed through the subsidiary Rete Ferroviaria Italiana) and the secondary narrow gauge network (of the ARST).

== Closed lines ==
Various lines closed after the Second World War and were subsequently dismantled, in almost all cases due to the choice of converting services to road transport, which was considered cheaper.

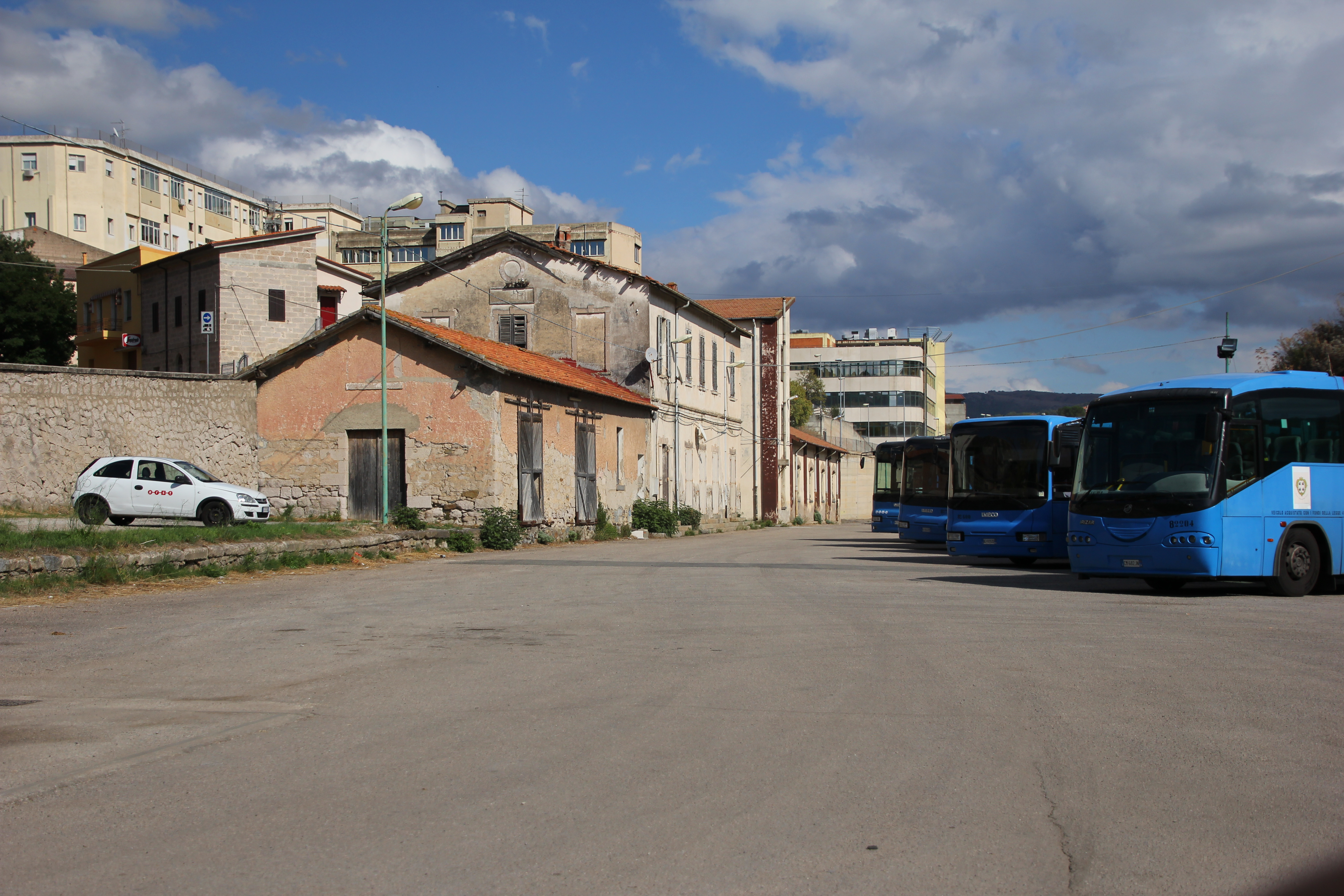
The former Ozieri station, one of the main airports of the disused Tirso-Chilivani

The grounds and infrastructure works (bridges, tunnels) are however still present, and in more than one case the proposal has been made to recover these routes as cycle paths.
