= Olmedo, Sardinia =

Olmedo S' Ulumedu (Sardinian)
- Comune
- Comune di Olmedo
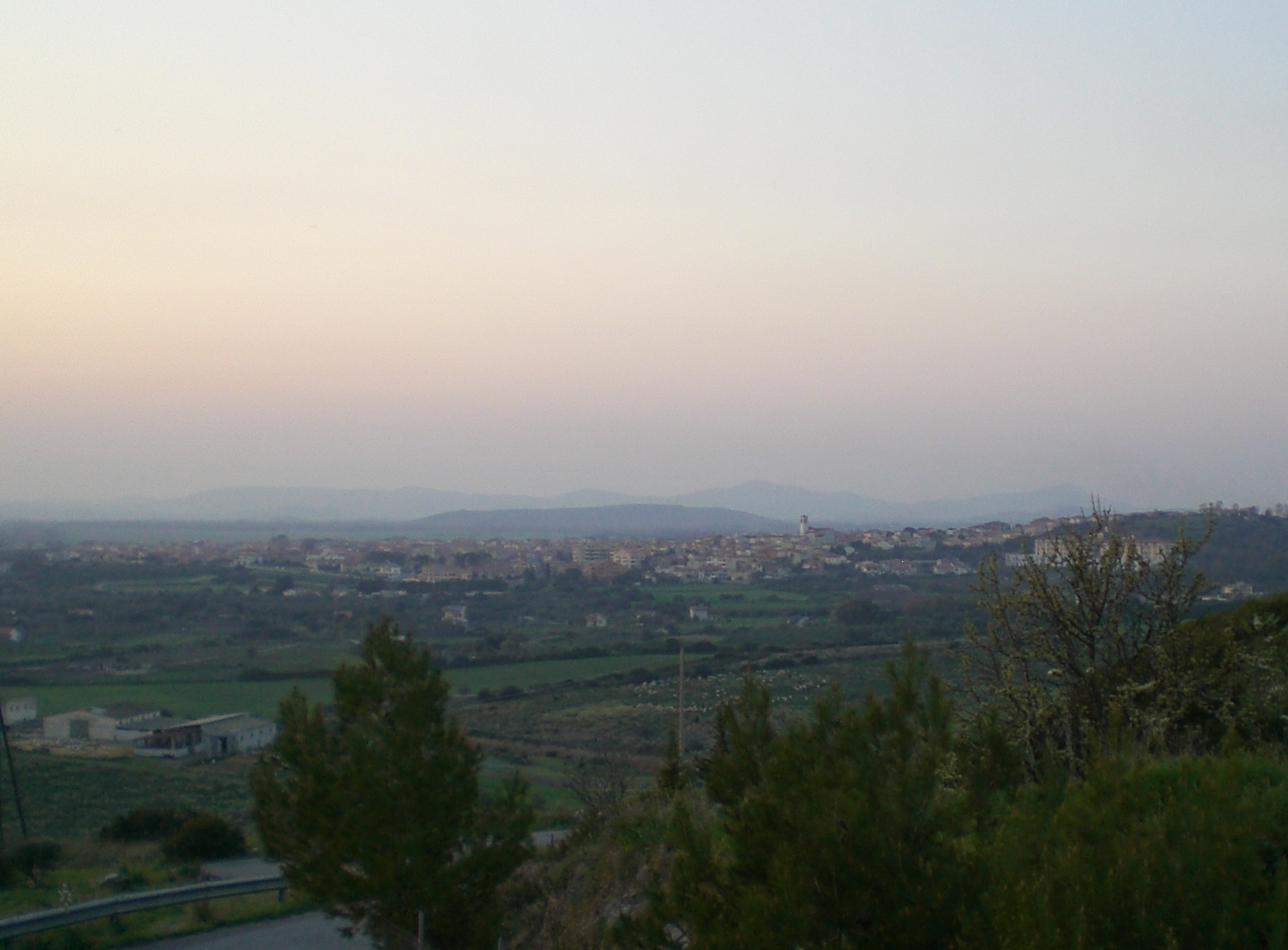
- View of Olmedo

- Coat of arms

- Location within Sardinia
- Coordinates: 40°39′N 8°23′E
- Country: Italy
- Region: Sardinia
- Metropolitan city: Sassari (SS)

Area
  - Total: 33.47 km^{2} (12.92 sq mi)

Population (2026)
  - Total: 4,240
  - Density: 127/km^{2} (328/sq mi)
- Demonym: Olmedesi
- Time zone: UTC+1 (CET)
  - Summer (DST): UTC+2 (CEST)
- Postal code: 07040
- Dialing code: 079
- Website: Official website

Olmedo (Sardinian: S' Ulumedu) is a town and comune (municipality) in the Metropolitan City of Sassari in the autonomous island region of Sardinia in Italy, located about 170 kilometres (110 mi) northwest of Cagliari and about 15 kilometres (9 mi) southwest of Sassari. It has 4,240 inhabitants.

Olmedo borders the municipalities of Alghero, Sassari, and Uri.

== Demographics ==
As of 2026, the population is 4,240, of which 49.8% are males, and 50.2% are females. Minors make up 13.4% of the population, and seniors make up 23.0%.

Historical population

Year	Pop.	±%
1861	425	—
1871	426	+0.2%
1881	481	+12.9%
1901	596	+23.9%
1911	727	+22.0%
1921	947	+30.3%
1931	1,146	+21.0%
1936	1,107	−3.4%

Year	Pop.	±%
1951	1,547	+39.7%
1961	1,534	−0.8%
1971	1,711	+11.5%
1981	2,172	+26.9%
1991	2,591	+19.3%
2001	2,852	+10.1%
2011	4,001	+40.3%
2021	4,134	+3.3%

Source: ISTAT

=== Immigration ===
As of 2025, immigrants make up 5.5% of the population. The 5 largest foreign countries of birth are Romania, Germany, Senegal, Switzerland, and France.
