= Capo Comino Lighthouse =

Lighthouse in Sardinia, Italy

Capo Comino
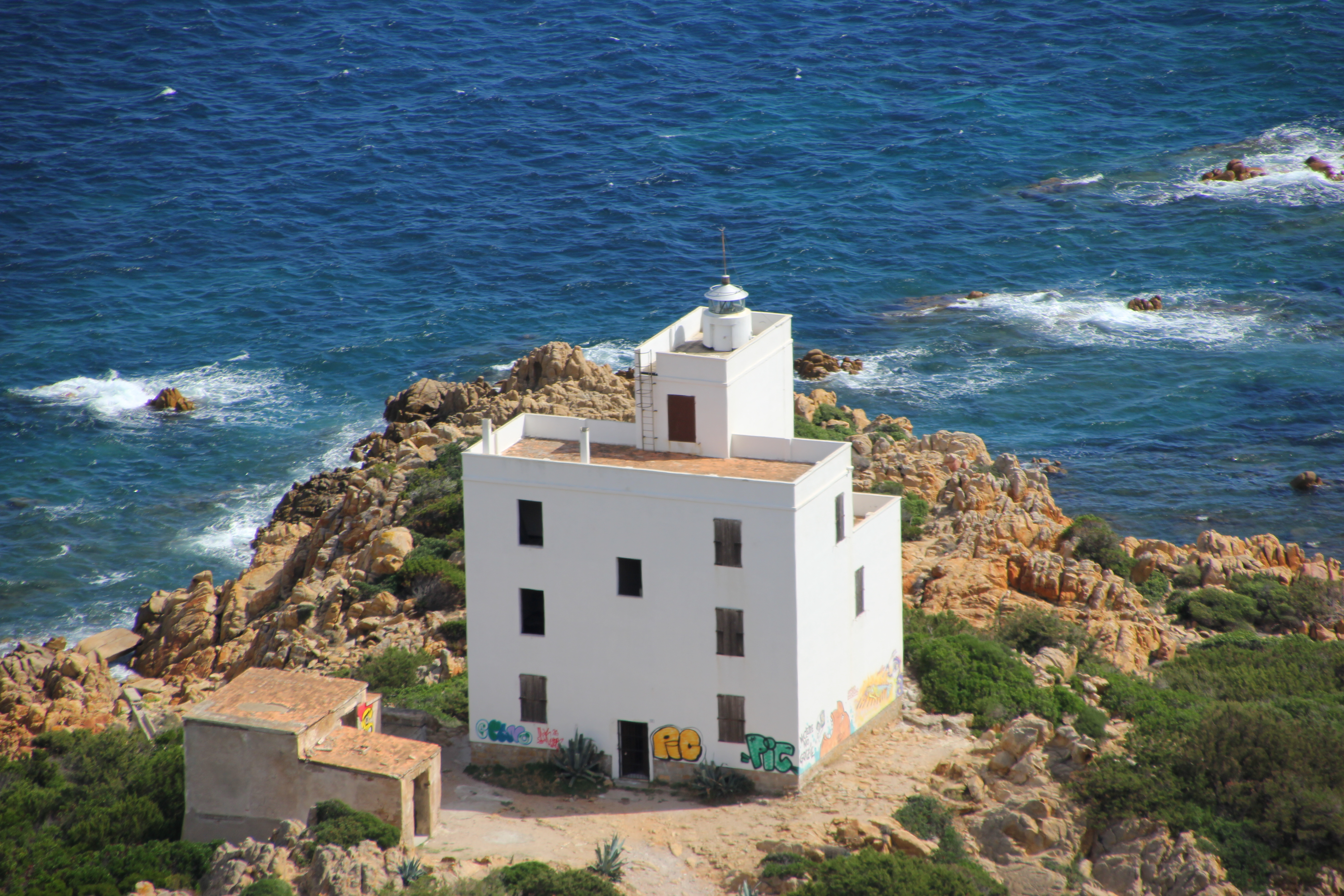
- Capo Comino Lighthouse
- Location: Capo Comino; Siniscola; Sardinia; Italy
- Coordinates: 40°31′42″N 9°49′40″E

Tower
- Constructed: 1903
- Foundation: masonry base
- Construction: masonry tower
- Automated: yes
- Height: 20 metres (66 ft)
- Shape: quadrangular tower with balcony and lantern atop a 3-storey keeper's house
- Markings: white tower and keeper's house, grey lantern dome
- Power source: mains electricity
- Operator: Marina Militare
- Fog signal: no

Light
- First lit: 1925
- Focal height: 26 metres (85 ft)
- Lens: Type TD; Focal length : 375 mm
- Intensity: main: AL 1000 W reserve: LABI 100 W
- Range: main: 15 nautical miles (28 km; 17 mi) reserve: 11 nautical miles (20 km; 13 mi)
- Characteristic: Fl W 5 s.
- Italy no.: 1230 E.F.

Capo Comino Lighthouse (Italian: Faro di Capo Comino) is an active lighthouse located on the easternmost promontory of Sardinia, in the municipality of Siniscola, on the Tyrrhenian Sea.

== Description ==
The lighthouse, built in 1903, was activated by the Regia Marina only in 1925 and consists of a masonry quadrangular tower, 20 metres (66 ft) high with balcony and lantern, attached to the seaside 3-storey white keeper's house. The lantern is painted in white, the lantern dome in grey metallic, and is positioned at 26 metres (85 ft) above sea level and emits one white flash in a 5 seconds period visible up to a distance of 15 nautical miles (28 km; 17 mi). The lighthouse is completely automated and operated by the Marina Militare with the identification code number 1230 E.F.

== See also ==
- List of lighthouses in Italy
- Siniscola
