= Monte Tuttavista =

Mountain in Italy

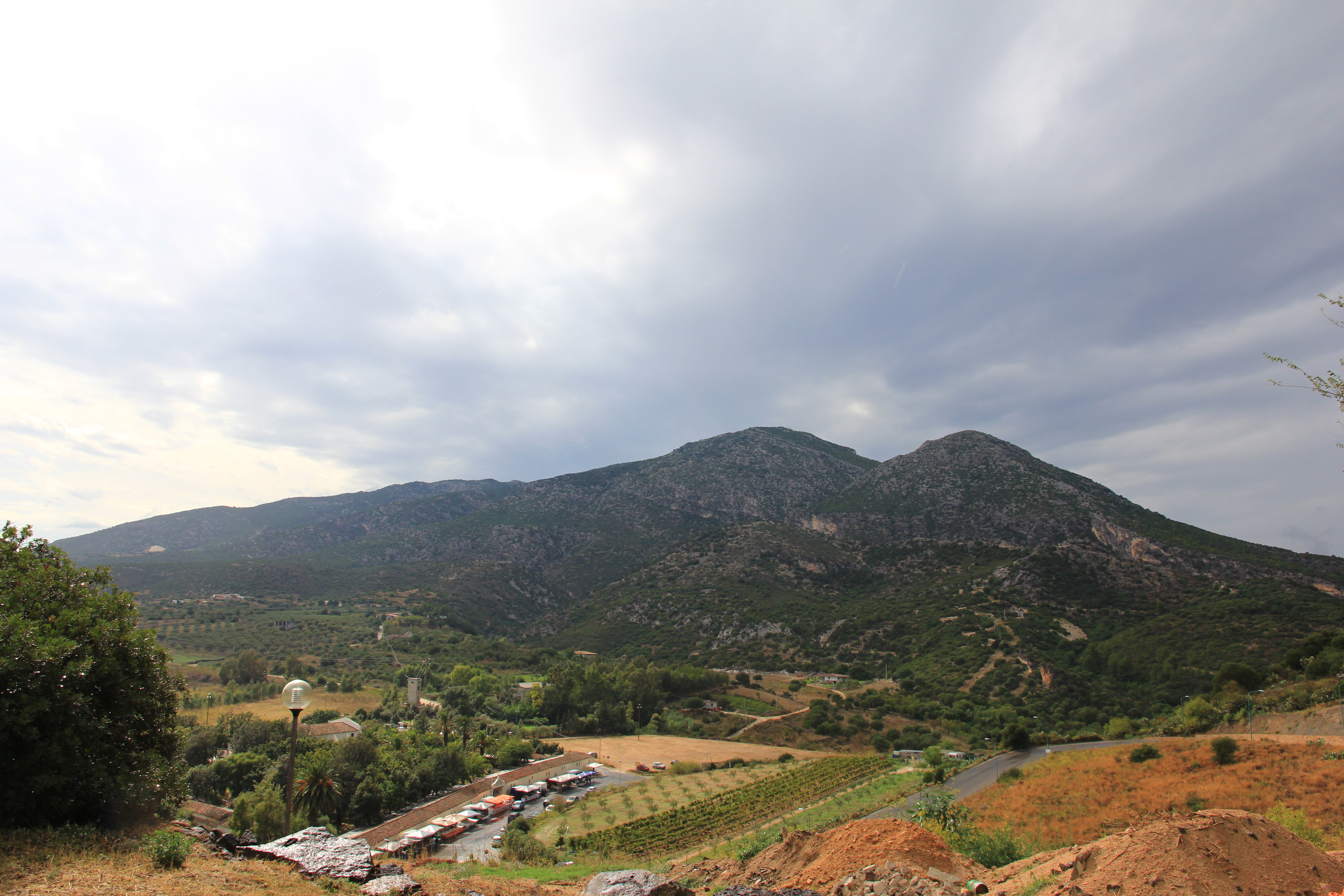

Highest point
- Elevation: 806 m (2,644 ft)
- Prominence: 596 m (1,955 ft)
- Coordinates: 40°22′52″N 09°38′18″E

Geography
- Location within Italy
- Location: Sardinia, Italy

Monte Tuttavista is a limestone massif located in the comune of Galtellì, in central-eastern Sardinia. The mountain, which reaches a height of 806 metres (2,644 ft), stands isolated on the Cedrino valley and dominates a vast stretch of territory that goes from Mount Senes di Irgoli to the mountains of Dorgali.

The vegetation cover consists of a mixed association of broad-leaved and coniferous trees with a prevalence of cork oak, holm oak, strawberry tree, phillyrea, mastic, myrtle, olive and the presence of Aleppo pine and domestic pine of artificial origin. Due to its remarkable environmental value, a large part of the mountain is incorporated in a forestry site managed by the Forestry Authority of Sardinia.
