= Orosei =

- Comune
- Comune di Orosei
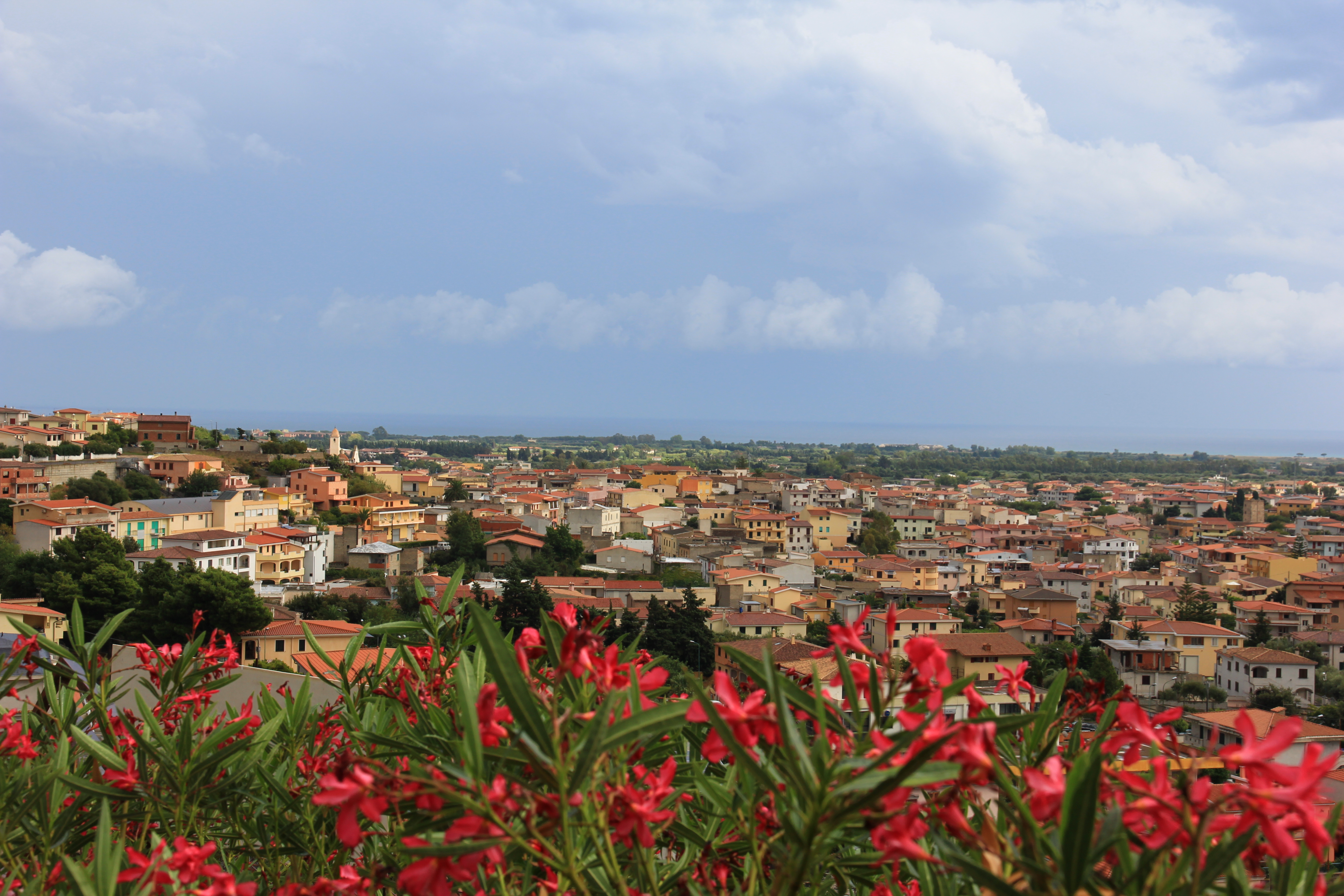
- View of Orosei

- Location within Sardinia
- Coordinates: 40°23′N 9°42′E
- Country: Italy
- Region: Sardinia
- Province: Nuoro (NU)
- Frazioni: Sos Alinos

Government
  - Mayor: Elisa Farris

Area
  - Total: 91.00 km^{2} (35.14 sq mi)
- Elevation: 19 m (62 ft)

Population (2026)
  - Total: 6,838
  - Density: 75.14/km^{2} (194.6/sq mi)
- Demonym: Oroseini
- Time zone: UTC+1 (CET)
  - Summer (DST): UTC+2 (CEST)
- Postal code: 08028
- Dialing code: 0784
- ISTAT code: 091063
- Patron saint: San Giacomo
- Saint day: 25th July
- Website: Official website

Orosei is a town and comune (municipality) in the Province of Nuoro in the autonomous island region of Sardinia in Italy, located about 140 kilometres (87 mi) northeast of Cagliari and about 40 kilometres (25 mi) east of Nuoro. It has 6,838 inhabitants.

Orosei borders the municipalities of Dorgali, Galtellì, Onifai, and Siniscola.

== Geography ==
Orosei is located on the Cedrino, an 80 kilometres (50 mi) long river. The highest mountain, shared with Galtellì, is the Monte Tuttavista: it's 806 metres (2,644 ft) high. It is a limestone massif.

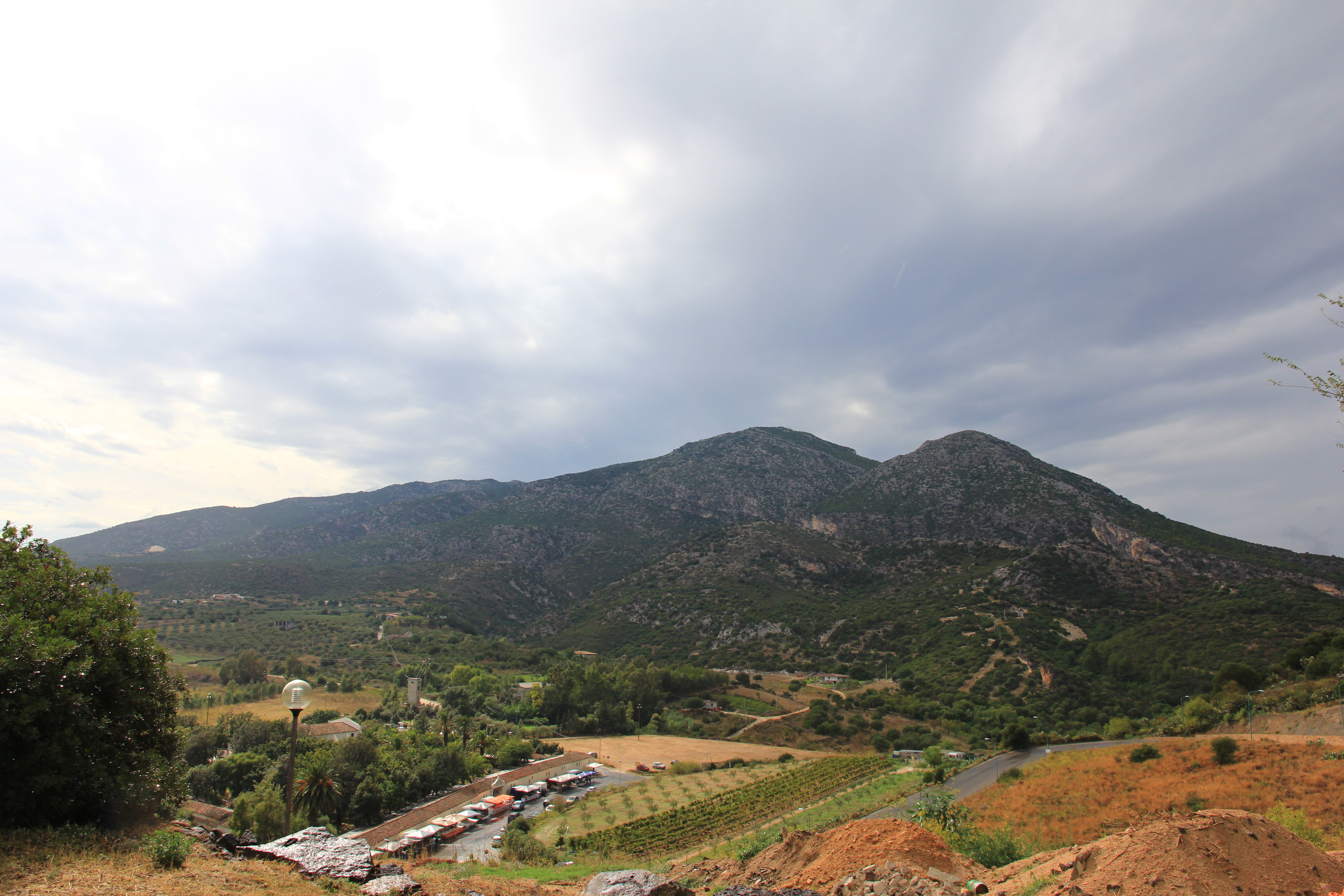
Monte Tuttavista

=== Climate ===
Climate data for Orosei (1981-2010)
Month	Jan	Feb	Mar	Apr	May	Jun	Jul	Aug	Sep	Oct	Nov	Dec	Year
Mean daily maximum °C (°F)	15.8 (60.4)	15.6 (60.1)	18.1 (64.6)	20.4 (68.7)	24.3 (75.7)	28.9 (84.0)	32.1 (89.8)	32.0 (89.6)	28.9 (84.0)	24.7 (76.5)	20.0 (68.0)	17.1 (62.8)	23.1 (73.6)
Mean daily minimum °C (°F)	6.4 (43.5)	5.8 (42.4)	7.9 (46.2)	10.3 (50.5)	13.8 (56.8)	17.9 (64.2)	20.8 (69.4)	21.0 (69.8)	18.1 (64.6)	14.5 (58.1)	10.3 (50.5)	7.8 (46.0)	12.9 (55.2)
Average precipitation mm (inches)	51.7 (2.04)	45.0 (1.77)	41.6 (1.64)	44.6 (1.76)	31.7 (1.25)	16.3 (0.64)	6.5 (0.26)	10.9 (0.43)	45.8 (1.80)	77.5 (3.05)	99.7 (3.93)	87.5 (3.44)	558.8 (22.00)
Source: Climatologia della Sardegna per il trentennio 1981-2010

== Demographics ==
As of 2026, the population is 6,838, of which 50.5% are male, and 49.5% are female. Minors make up 13.6% of the population, and seniors make up 23.9%.

Historical population

Year	Pop.	±%
1861	1,833	—
1871	1,821	−0.7%
1881	1,907	+4.7%
1901	2,079	+9.0%
1911	2,277	+9.5%
1921	2,322	+2.0%
1931	2,513	+8.2%
1936	2,737	+8.9%

Year	Pop.	±%
1951	3,484	+27.3%
1961	4,214	+21.0%
1971	4,085	−3.1%
1981	4,788	+17.2%
1991	5,264	+9.9%
2001	5,870	+11.5%
2011	6,794	+15.7%
2021	6,833	+0.6%

Source: ISTAT

=== Immigration ===
As of 2025, immigrants make up 10.3% of the population. The 5 largest foreign countries of birth are Romania, Morocco, Germany, France, and Switzerland.

== Sights ==
The town has 27 documented churches with 13 that still survive today, including San Giacomo Apostolo, Su Remediu and Sant'Antonio Abate.

Orosei has tourist-destination beaches, including the Gulf of Orosei, Cala Ginepro, Sas Linnas Sicca, Cala Liberotto and the Bidderosa Oasis.

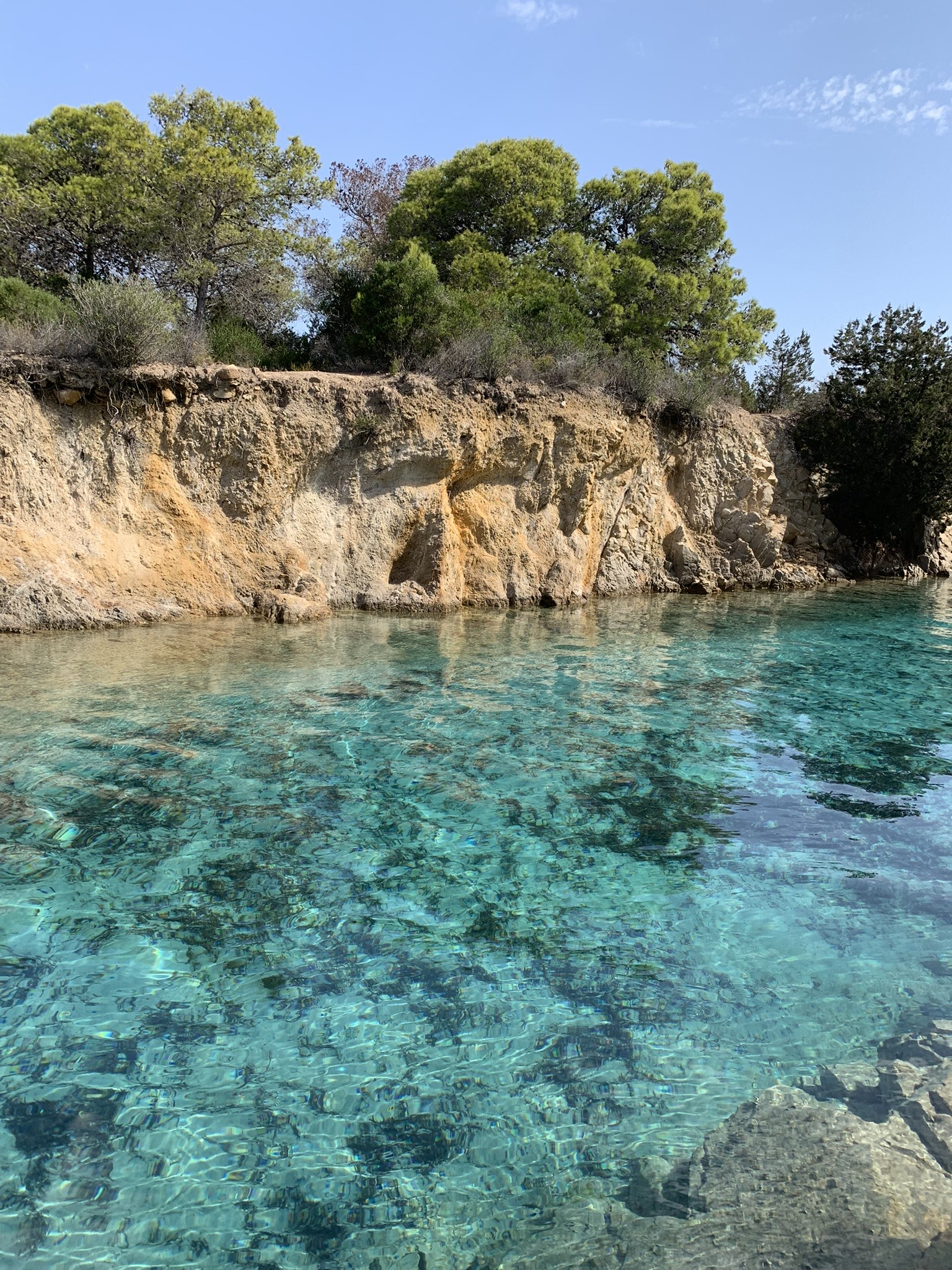
Sa Curcurica near Cala Ginepro

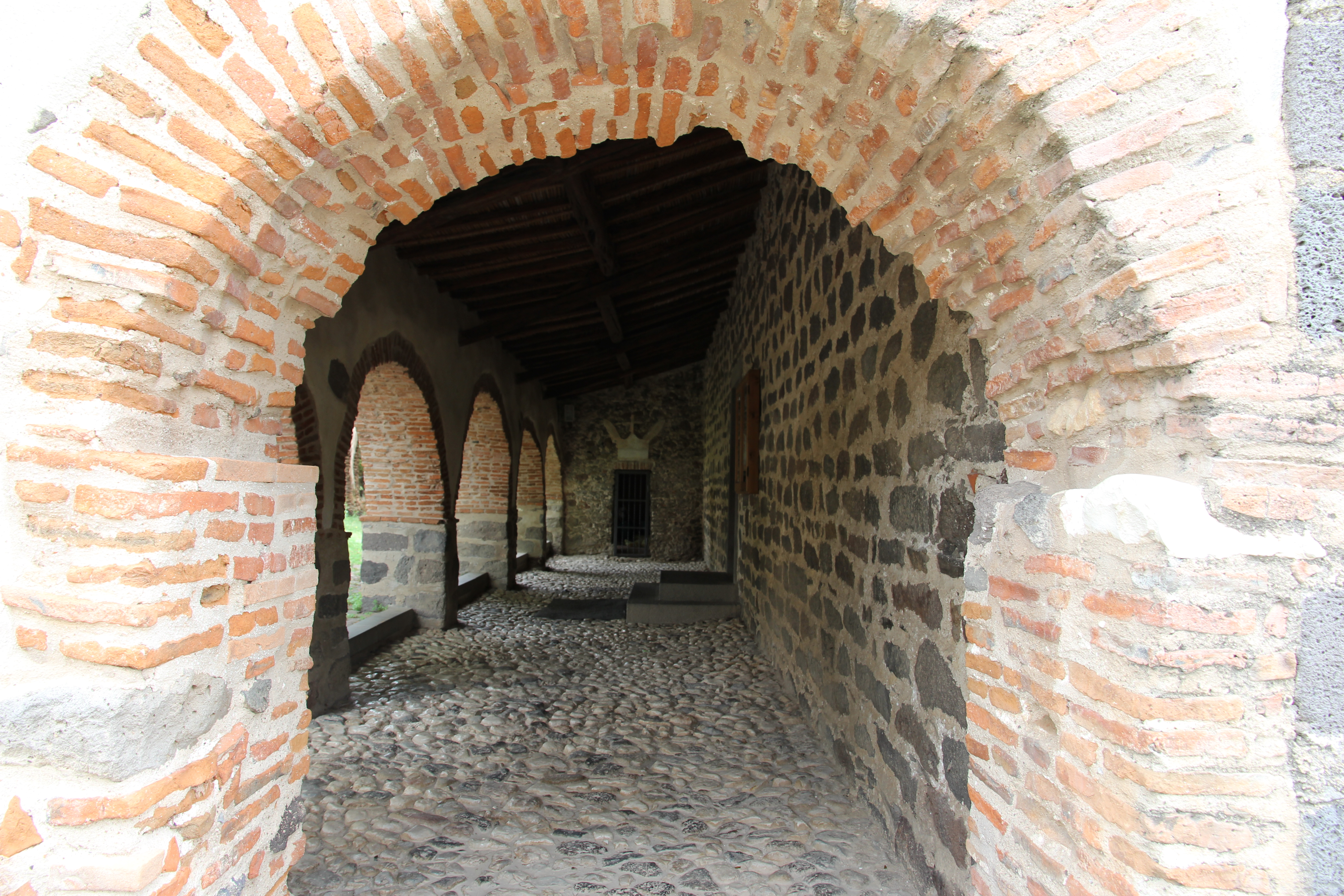
The porch of the church of Sant'Antonio Abate

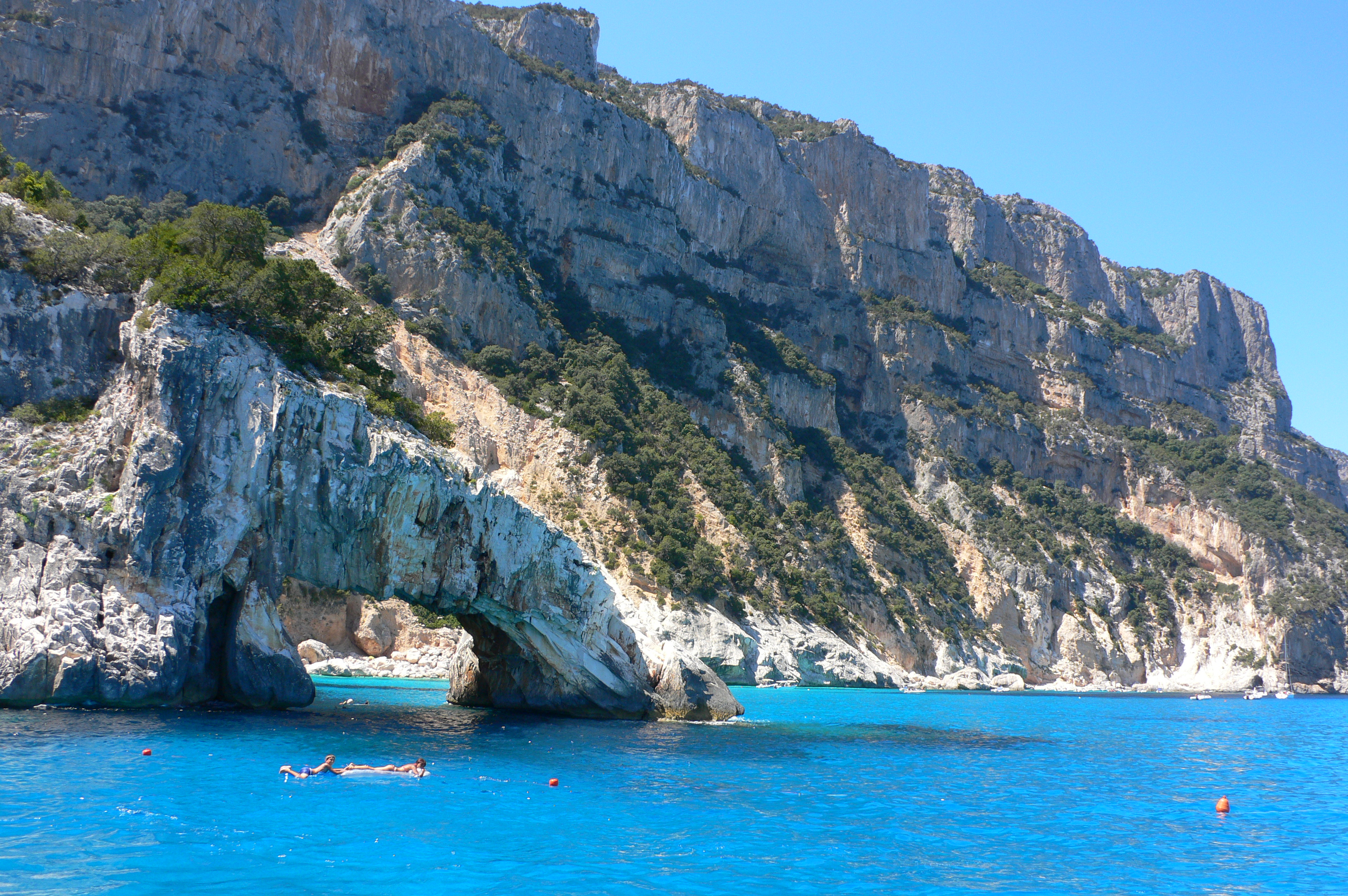
Gulf of Orosei

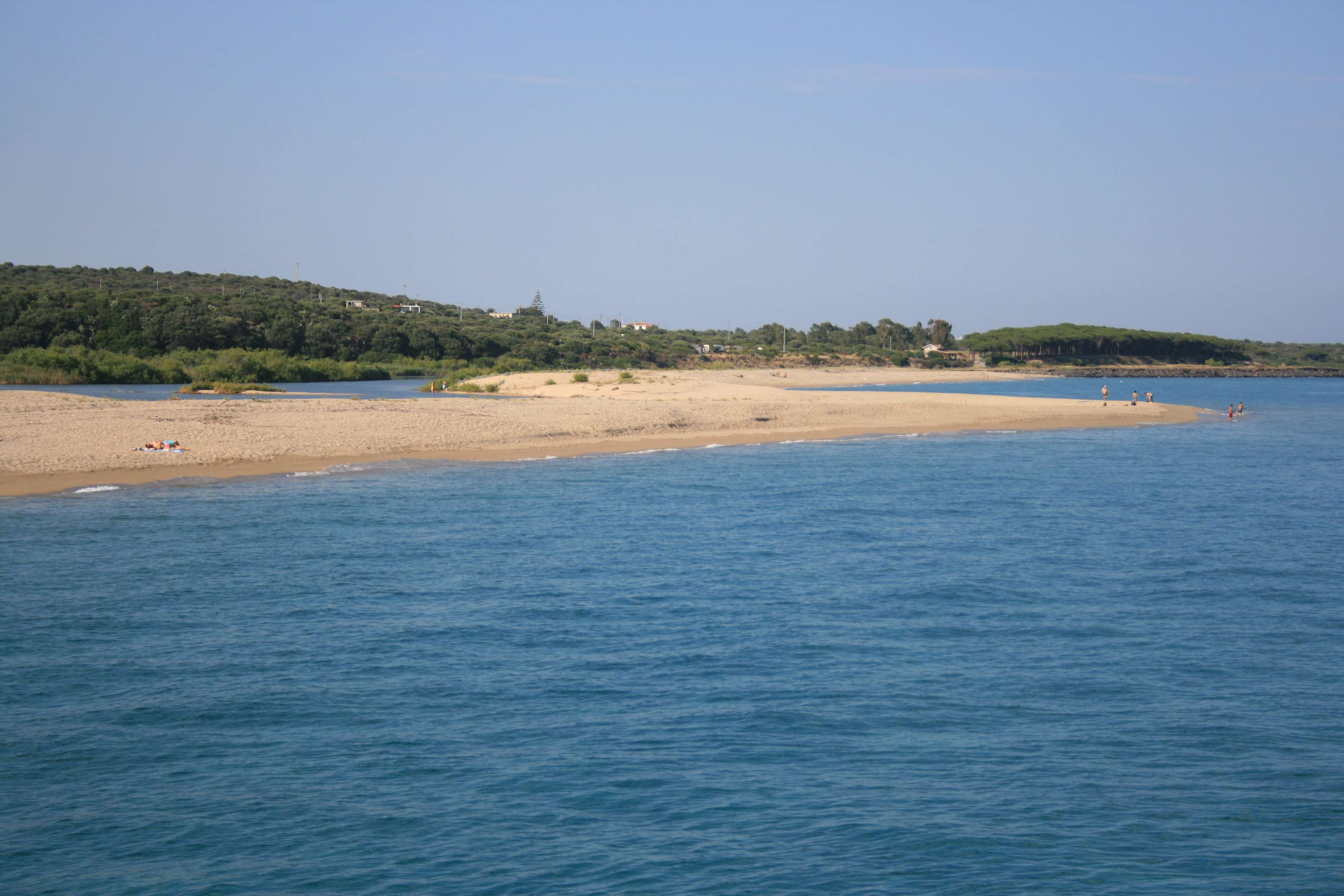
Marina di Orosei

== Culture ==
The town recognizes three religious festivals, Sant'Isidoro, Santa Maria 'e Mare and Sant'Antonio Abate. They celebrate with processions. In particular, Sant'Antonio is celebrated with a big fire.
