= Onanì =

Onanì Onanìe (Sardinian)
- Comune
- Comune di Onanì
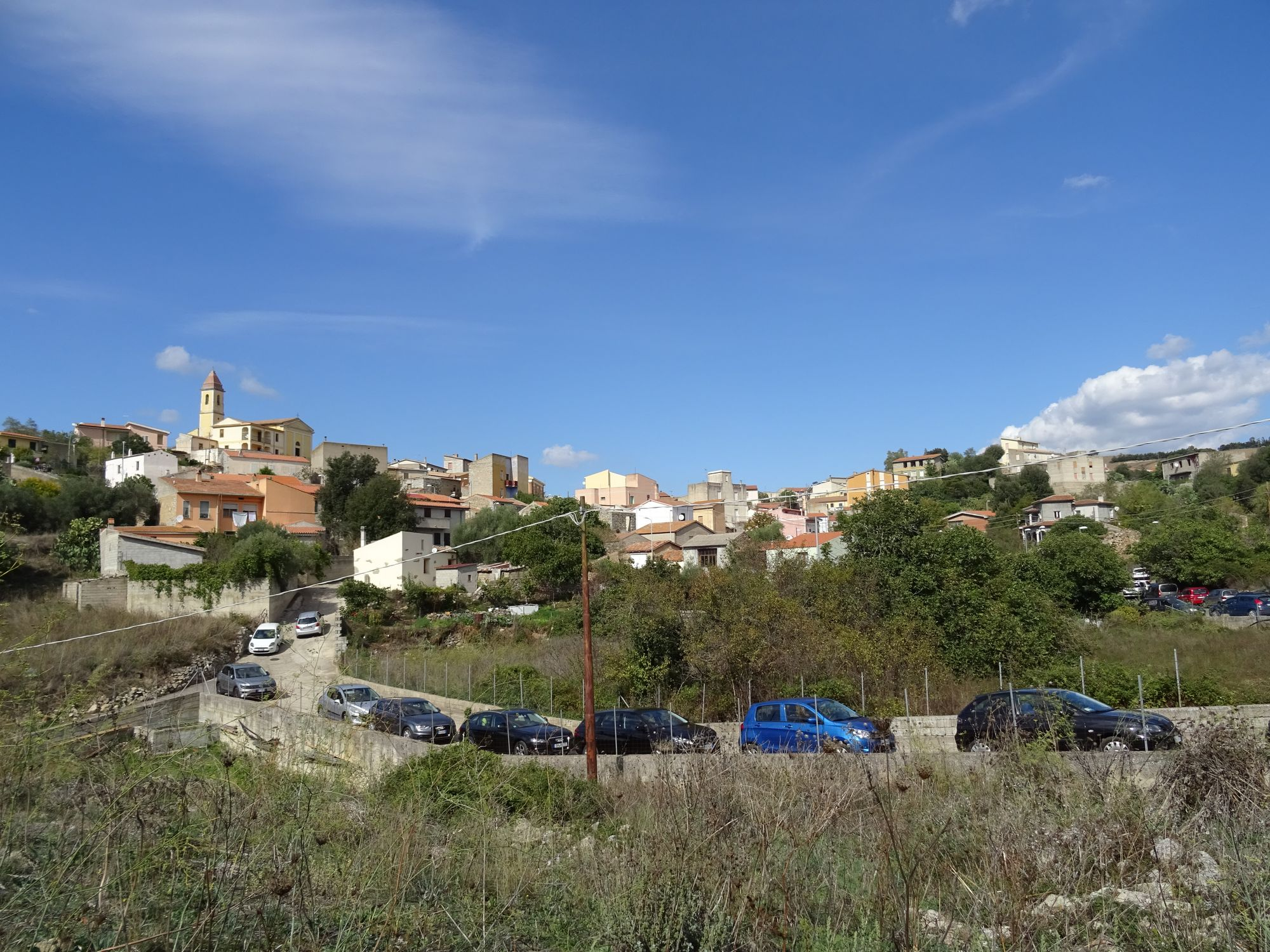
- View of Onanì

- Location within Sardinia
- Coordinates: 40°29′N 9°26′E
- Country: Italy
- Region: Sardinia
- Province: Nuoro (NU)
- Frazioni: Mamone

Area
  - Total: 71.97 km^{2} (27.79 sq mi)

Population (2026)
  - Total: 337
  - Density: 4.68/km^{2} (12.1/sq mi)
- Demonym: Onaniesi
- Time zone: UTC+1 (CET)
  - Summer (DST): UTC+2 (CEST)
- Postal code: 08020;
- Dialing code: 0784
- Website: Official website

Onanì (Sardinian: Onanìe) is a village and comune (municipality) in the Province of Nuoro in the autonomous island region of Sardinia in Italy, located about 140 kilometres (87 mi) north of Cagliari and about 20 kilometres (12 mi) northeast of Nuoro. It has 337 inhabitants.

The municipality of Onanì contains the frazione (subdivision) Mamone (penal colony).

Onanì borders the municipalities of Bitti, Lodè, and Lula.

== Demographics ==
As of 2026, the population is 337, of which 48.7% are male, and 51.3% are female. Minors make up 11.3% of the population, and seniors make up 30.3%.

Historical population

Year	Pop.	±%
1861	221	—
1871	228	+3.2%
1881	228	+0.0%
1901	515	+125.9%
1911	462	−10.3%
1921	719	+55.6%
1931	682	−5.1%
1936	889	+30.4%

Year	Pop.	±%
1951	1,177	+32.4%
1961	1,459	+24.0%
1971	1,013	−30.6%
1981	730	−27.9%
1991	539	−26.2%
2001	473	−12.2%
2011	430	−9.1%
2021	373	−13.3%

Source: ISTAT

=== Immigration ===
As of 2025, immigrants make up 3.4% of the population. The 5 largest foreign countries of birth are Belgium, Romania, Germany, Egypt, and India.
