= Lodè =

- Comune
- Comune di Lodè
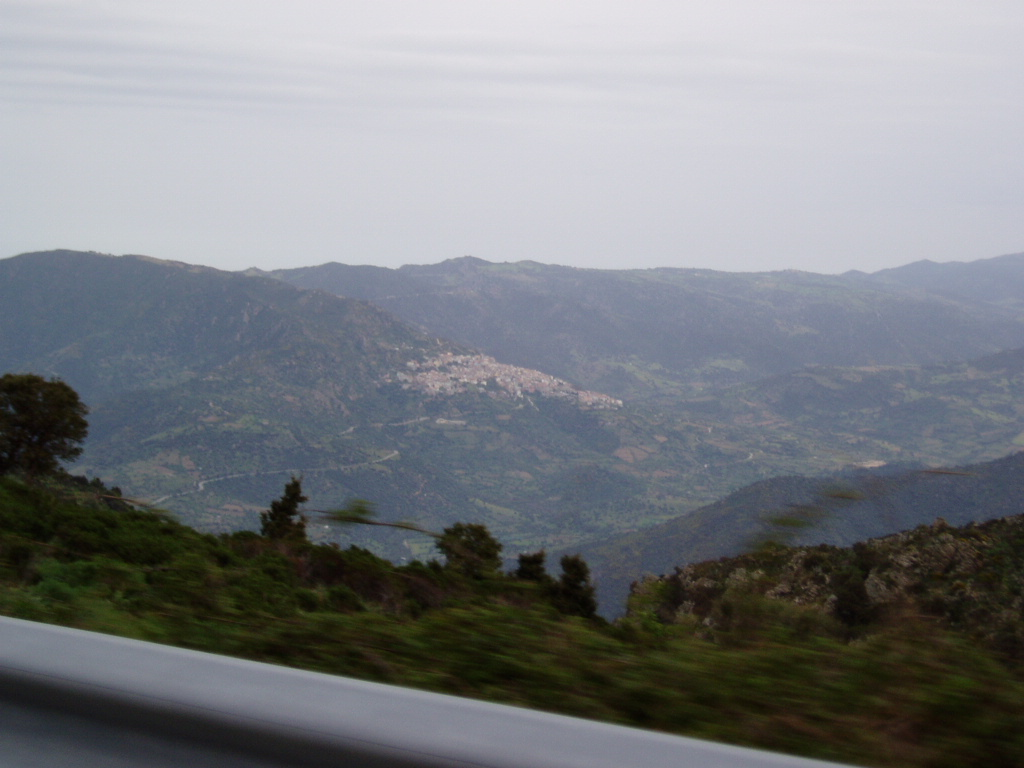
- View of Lodé

- Location within Sardinia
- Coordinates: 40°35′N 9°33′E
- Country: Italy
- Region: Sardinia
- Province: Province of Nuoro (NU)

Area
  - Total: 123.45 km^{2} (47.66 sq mi)

Population (2026)
  - Total: 1,455
  - Density: 11.79/km^{2} (30.53/sq mi)
- Demonym: Lodeini
- Time zone: UTC+1 (CET)
  - Summer (DST): UTC+2 (CEST)
- Postal code: 08020
- Dialing code: 0784

Lodè is a town and comune (municipality) in the Province of Nuoro in the autonomous island region of Sardinia in Italy, located about 160 kilometres (99 mi) north of Cagliari and about 35 kilometres (22 mi) northeast of Nuoro. It has 1,455 inhabitants.

Lodè borders the municipalities of Bitti, Lula, Onanì, Padru, Siniscola, and Torpè.

== Demographics ==
As of 2026, the population is 1,455, of which 50.4% are male, and 49.6% are female. Minors make up 7.6% of the population, and seniors make up 34.3%.

Historical population

| Year | Pop. | ±% |
|---|---|---|
| 1861 | 984 | — |
| 1871 | 996 | +1.2% |
| 1881 | 1,277 | +28.2% |
| 1901 | 1,524 | +19.3% |
| 1911 | 1,765 | +15.8% |
| 1921 | 1,917 | +8.6% |
| 1931 | 2,097 | +9.4% |
| 1936 | 2,315 | +10.4% |

| Year | Pop. | ±% |
|---|---|---|
| 1951 | 3,118 | +34.7% |
| 1961 | 3,562 | +14.2% |
| 1971 | 3,079 | −13.6% |
| 1981 | 3,010 | −2.2% |
| 1991 | 2,465 | −18.1% |
| 2001 | 2,212 | −10.3% |
| 2011 | 1,894 | −14.4% |
| 2021 | 1,529 | −19.3% |

Source: ISTAT

=== Immigration ===
As of 2025, immigrants make up 4.6% of the population. The 5 largest foreign countries of birth are Germany, Belgium, Morocco, Switzerland, and Tunisia.
