= Bitti =

Bitti Bitzi (Sardinian)
- Comune
- Comune di Bitti
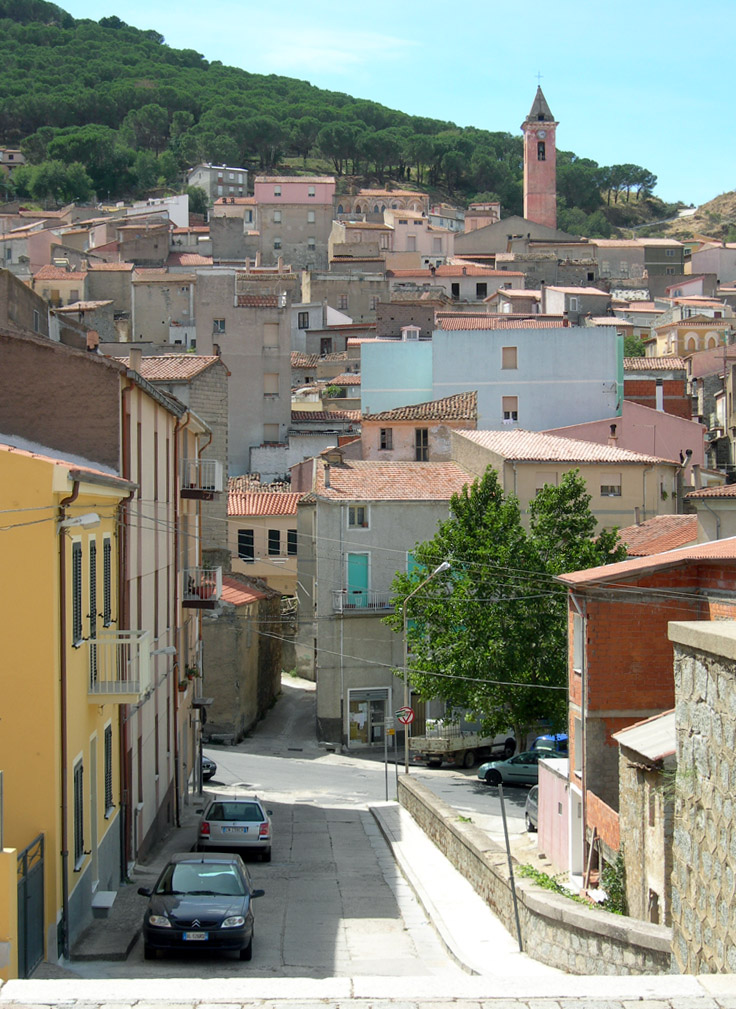
- View of Bitti

- Coat of arms

- Location within Sardinia
- Coordinates: 40°28′30″N 9°22′54″E
- Country: Italy
- Region: Sardinia
- Province: Nuoro (NU)

Government
  - Mayor: Giuseppe Ciccolini

Area
  - Total: 215.37 km^{2} (83.15 sq mi)
- Elevation: 549 m (1,801 ft)

Population (2026)
  - Total: 2,476
  - Density: 11.50/km^{2} (29.78/sq mi)
- Demonym: Bittesi
- Time zone: UTC+1 (CET)
  - Summer (DST): UTC+2 (CEST)
- Postal code: 08021
- Dialing code: 0784
- Patron saint: St. George
- Saint day: 23 April
- Website: Official website

Bitti (Sardinian: Bitzi) is a town and comune (municipality) in the Province of Nuoro in the autonomous island region of Sardinia in Italy. It is located about 140 kilometres (87 mi) north of Cagliari and about 20 kilometres (12 mi) north of Nuoro. It has 2,476 inhabitants.

Bitti borders the municipalities of Alà dei Sardi, Buddusò, Lodè, Lula, Nule, Onanì, Orune, Osidda, and Padru.

== History ==
The commune takes its name from the Sardinian language term bitta for female deer. There had been evidence of a pre-historic Nuragic civilization settlement on the land where Bitti is located. This came from a series of granite huts and temples that extended 13 kilometres (8.1 mi) up to a plateau in the nearby forest. There was evidence that it was already existing in Roman times. The name of Bitti came from a 2nd-3rd century AD settlement. it is mentioned in 1170 as Bitthe. Bitti was a provincial capital of the Giudicato of Gallura and, from the 14th century, was part of the Giudicato of Torres. It was later included in the marquisate of Orani. The modern village was constructed and developed around the Roman Catholic Church of St George's.

In 2020, during the COVID-19 pandemic in Italy, Bitti's inhabitants regularly cleaned their streets and decorated them with flowers, which was promoted by the municipal government to create a sense of community. In 2024, Bitti gained international attention due to the priest of St George's conducting Mass and giving sermons in the local bars with beer after. This was done to alleviate waning church attendance and to get Christian worship open in the community.

== Demographics ==
As of 2026, the population is 2,476, of which 48.1% are male, and 51.9% are female. Minors make up 12.6% of the population, and seniors make up 32.4%.

Historical population

Year	Pop.	±%
1861	3,272	—
1871	3,317	+1.4%
1881	3,517	+6.0%
1901	4,613	+31.2%
1911	4,770	+3.4%
1921	5,098	+6.9%
1931	5,340	+4.7%
1936	5,733	+7.4%

Year	Pop.	±%
1951	5,829	+1.7%
1961	5,774	−0.9%
1971	4,645	−19.6%
1981	4,473	−3.7%
1991	3,928	−12.2%
2001	3,481	−11.4%
2011	3,019	−13.3%
2021	2,610	−13.5%

Source: ISTAT

=== Immigration ===
As of 2025, immigrants make up 3.1% of the population. The 5 largest foreign countries of birth are Romania, Morocco, Switzerland, France, and China.

== Main sights ==
- Su Romanzesu nuragic archaeological complex
- Church of Santu Jorgi (St. George)

== See also ==
- Tenores di Bitti, a folk music group from Bitti
