= Su Romanzesu =

Archaeological site near Bitti, Sardinia

Coordinates: 40.5303°N 9.3247°E

Romanzesu archeological area
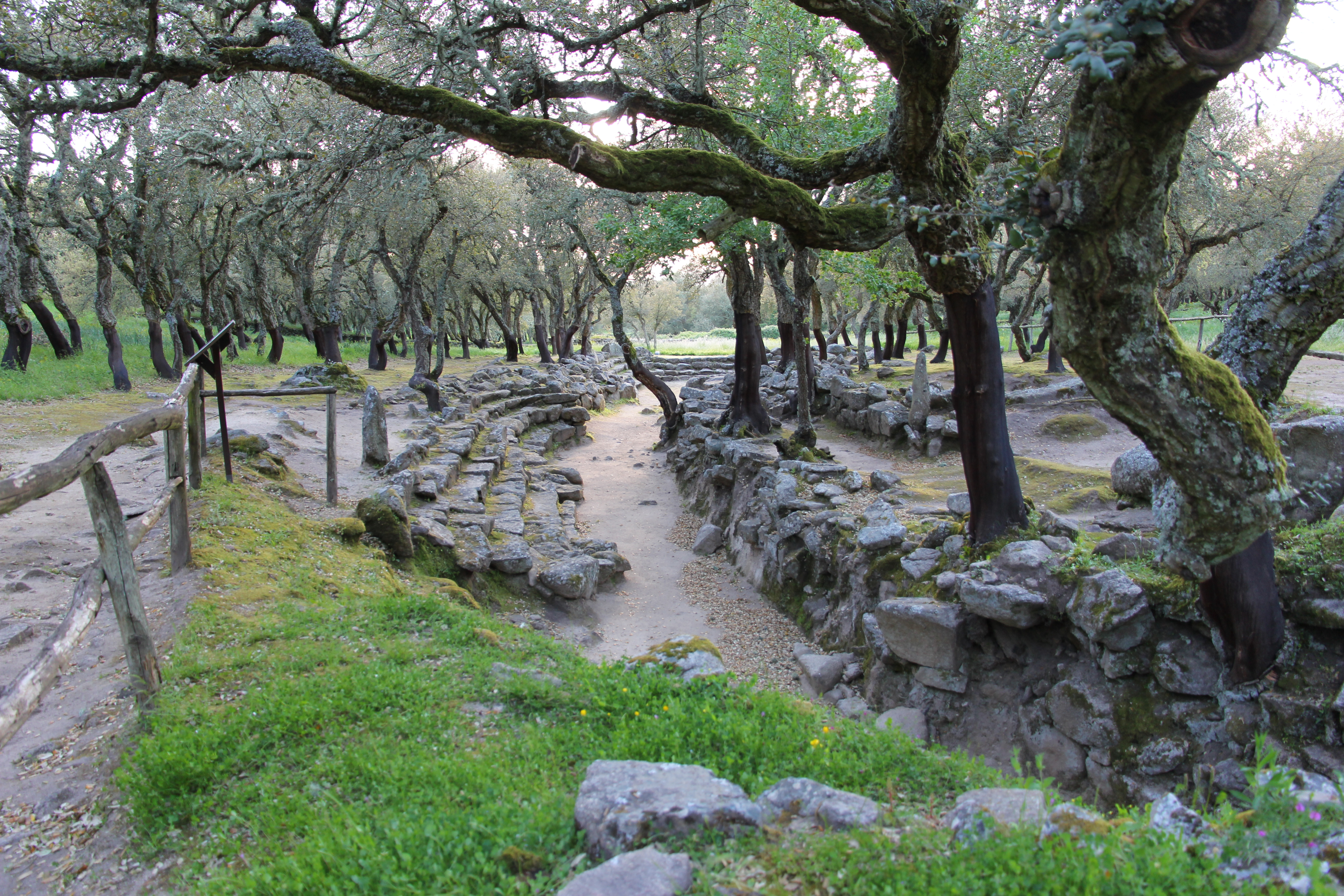
- Interactive map of Romanzesu archeological area
- Type: Sanctuary Village
- Periods: Bronze Age
- Cultures: Nuragic civilization
- Location: Bitti, Sardinia, Italy

History
- Built: XIV B.C
- Abandoned: VII B.C

Site notes
- Material: granite
- Archaeologists: Antonio Taramelli, Maria Ausilia Fadda
- Discovered: Antonio Taramelli (1921)
- Management: Cooperativa Istelai
- Website: www.romanzesu.sardegna.it

Romanzesu is an archaeological site that is located near Bitti, Nuoro Province, Sardinia.

It consists of a Bronze Age nuragic sanctuary village of more than seven hectares. The site includes a holy well, one hundred huts, two megaron temples, a rectangular temple or Heroon, an elliptical amphitheater, and a large labyrinth structure.

The name Romanzesu probably derives from the presence of Roman remains. During the 2nd-3rd centuries AD, the area was occupied by the Romans.

== Gallery ==
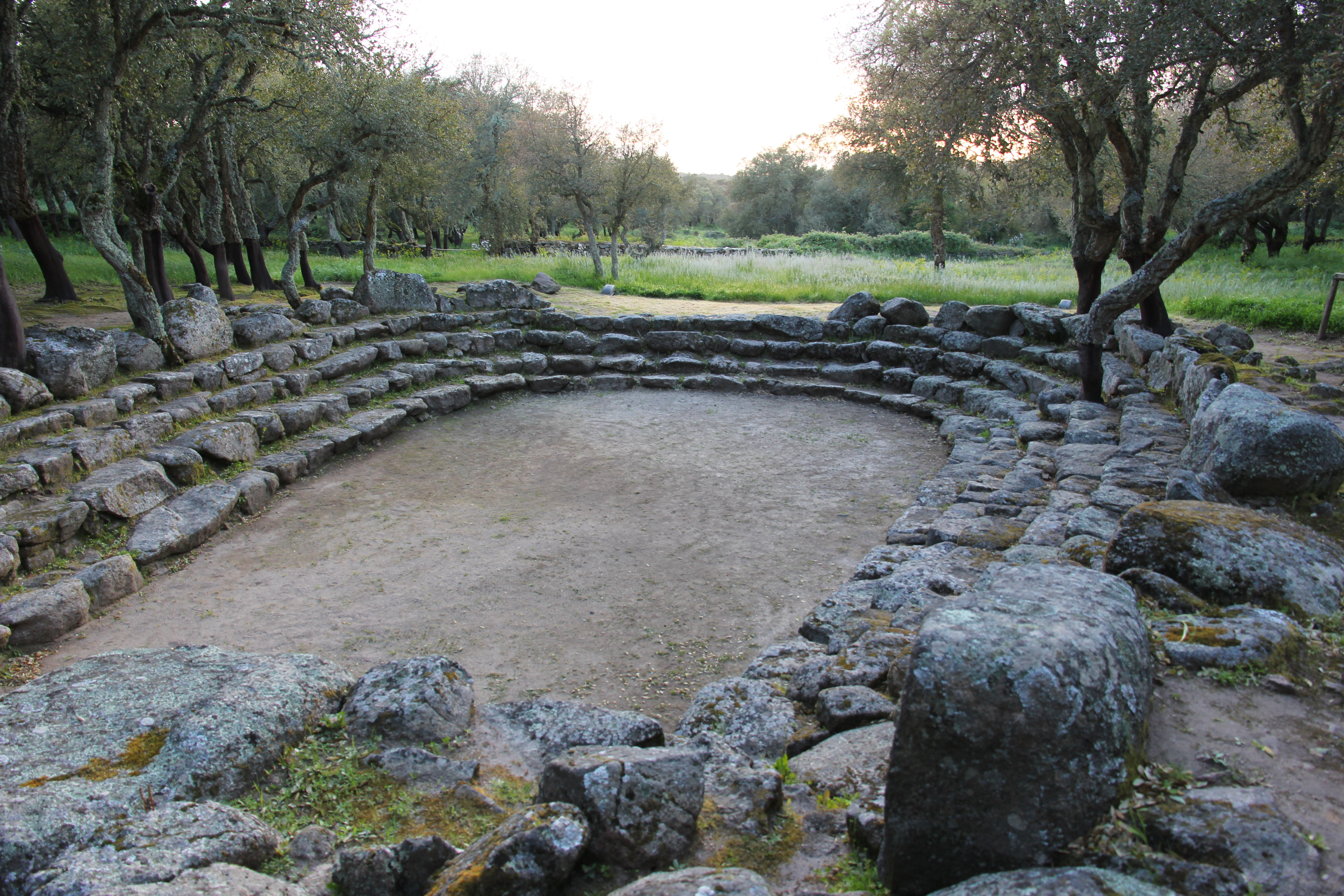

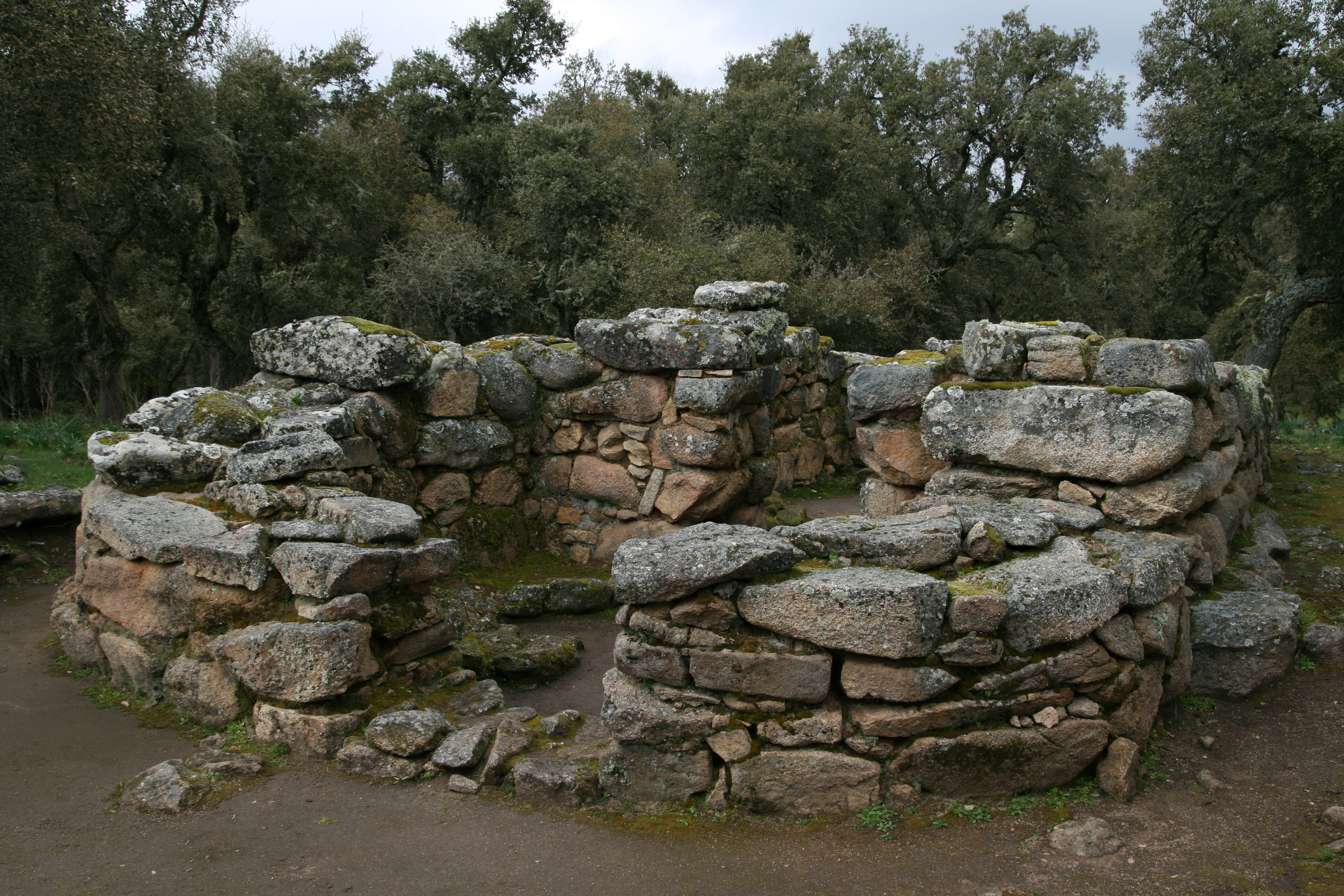

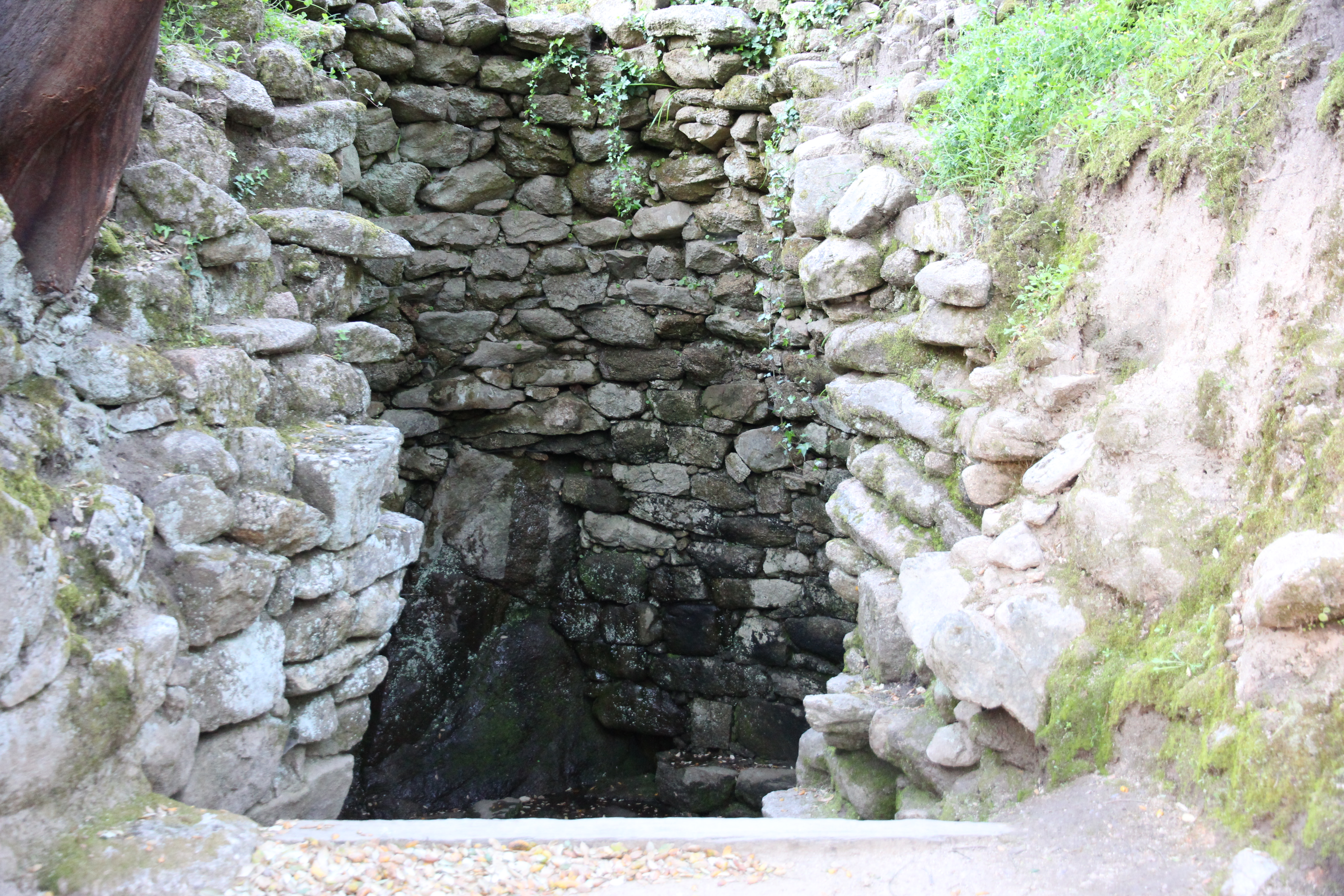

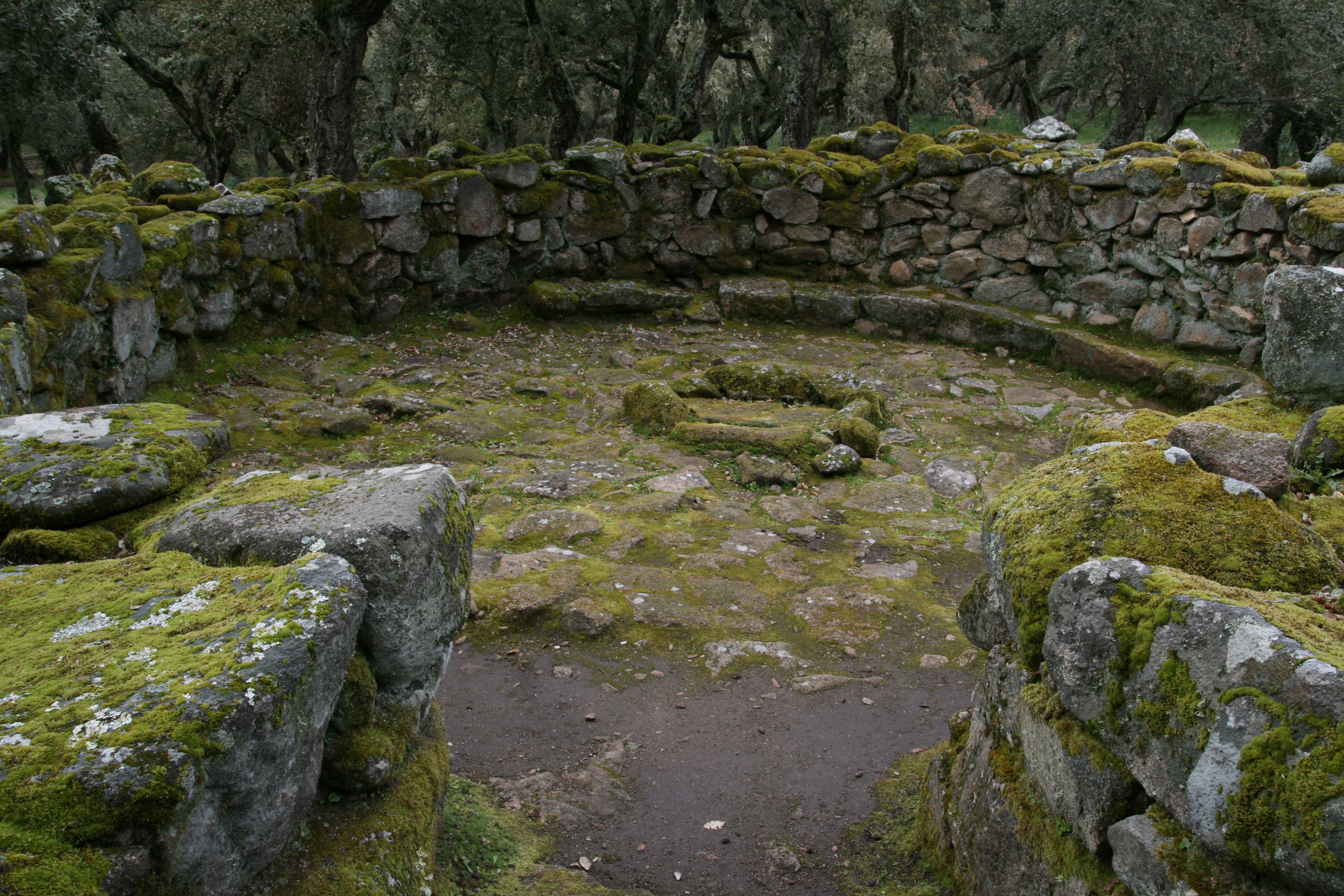

== Bibliography ==
- A. Taramelli, Foglio 207, Nuoro, in Edizione Archeologica della Carta d'Italia, Firenze, Istituto Geografico Militare, 1931, p. 12, n. 23;
- Ch. Zervos, La civilisation de la Sardaigne, du début de l'énéolithique à la fin de la période nouragique: 2. millenaire, 5. siecle avant notre ere, Paris, Cahiers d'art, 1954, p. 285;
- G. Lilliu, La civiltà dei Sardi dal Paleolitico all'età dei Nuraghi, Torino, Nuova ERI, 1988, p. 534;
- M.A. Fadda, Su Romanzesu: il villaggio e lo stregone, in Archeologia Viva, 69, maggio-giugno 1998, pp. 62–67;
- M.A. Fadda, Nuove acquisizioni del megalitismo nel territorio della provincia di Nuoro, in Aspetti del megalitismo preistorico, Dolianova, Grafica del Parteolla, 2001, pp. 48–66;
- M.A. Fadda, Nuove acquisizioni dell'architettura cultuale della Sardegna nuragica, in Etruria e Sardegna centro-settentrionale tra l'età del bronzo finale e l'arcaismo. Atti del XXI Convegno di Studi Etruschi e Italici (Sassari, Alghero, Oristano, Torralba, 13-17 ottobre 1998), Pisa-Roma, 2002, pp. 311–332.
