= Loculi =

Loculi Lòcula (Sardinian)
- Comune
- Comune di Loculi
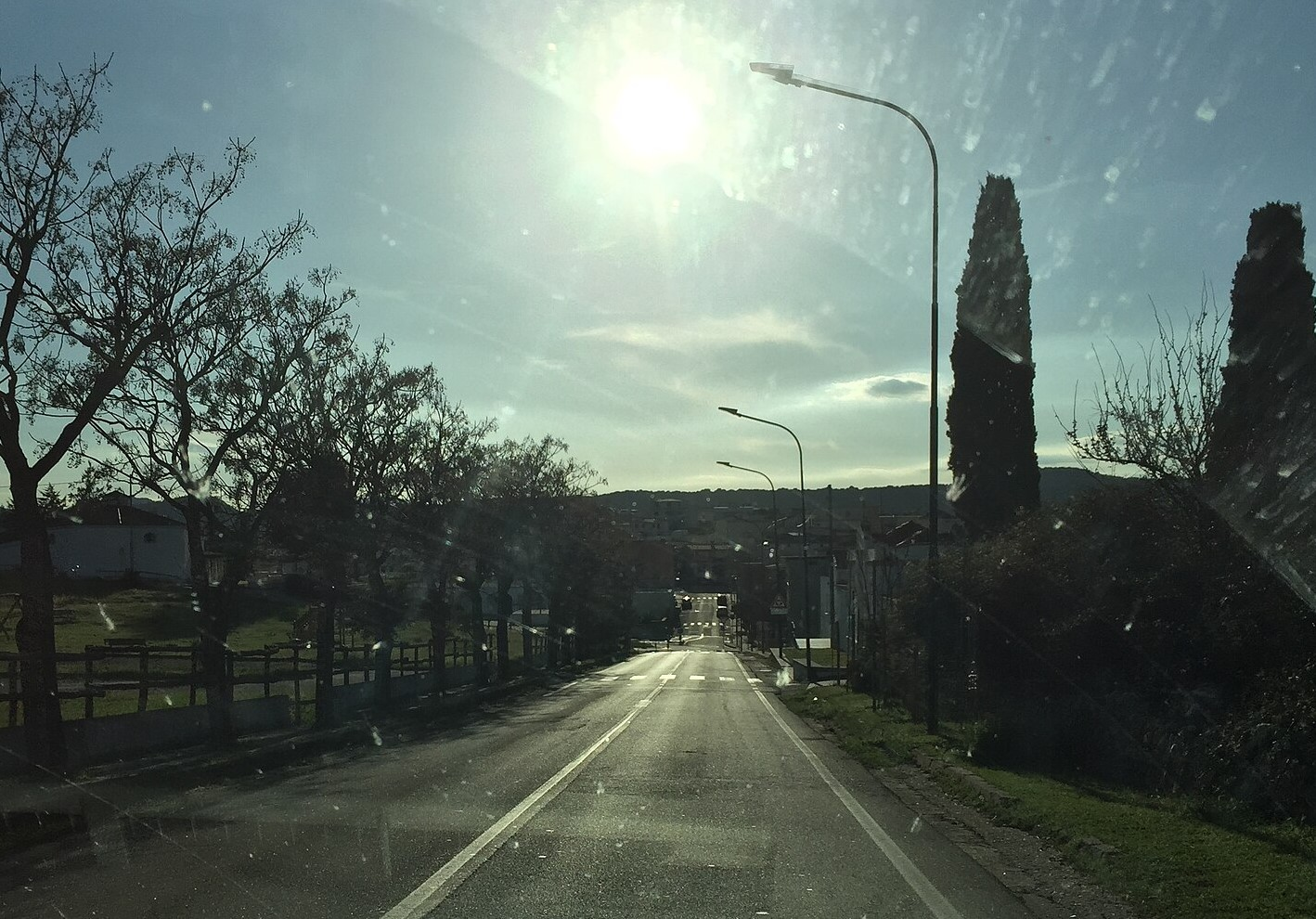
- View of Loculi

- Location within Sardinia
- Coordinates: 40°24′N 9°37′E
- Country: Italy
- Region: Sardinia
- Province: Province of Nuoro (NU)

Area
  - Total: 38.15 km^{2} (14.73 sq mi)
- Elevation: 26 m (85 ft)

Population (2026)
  - Total: 476
  - Density: 12.5/km^{2} (32.3/sq mi)
- Demonym: loculesi
- Time zone: UTC+1 (CET)
  - Summer (DST): UTC+2 (CEST)
- Postal code: 08020
- Dialing code: 0784

Loculi (Sardinian: Lòcula) is a village and comune (municipality) in the Province of Nuoro in the autonomous island region of Sardinia in Italy, located about 140 kilometres (87 mi) northeast of Cagliari and about 25 kilometres (16 mi) northeast of Nuoro. It has 476 inhabitants.

Loculi borders the municipalities of Galtellì, Irgoli, and Lula.

== Demographics ==
As of 2026, the population is 476, of which 54.0% are male, and 46.0% are female. Minors make up 15.8% of the population, and seniors make up 26.5%.

Historical population

Year	Pop.	±%
1861	224	—
1871	233	+4.0%
1881	243	+4.3%
1901	302	+24.3%
1911	325	+7.6%
1921	311	−4.3%
1931	402	+29.3%
1936	398	−1.0%

Year	Pop.	±%
1951	523	+31.4%
1961	696	+33.1%
1971	614	−11.8%
1981	608	−1.0%
1991	558	−8.2%
2001	523	−6.3%
2011	515	−1.5%
2021	508	−1.4%

Source: ISTAT

=== Immigration ===
As of 2025, immigrants make up 5.7% of the population. The 5 largest foreign countries of birth are Morocco, France, Germany, Romania, and Senegal.
