= Onifai =

Onifai Oniai (Sardinian)
- Comune
- Comune di Onifai
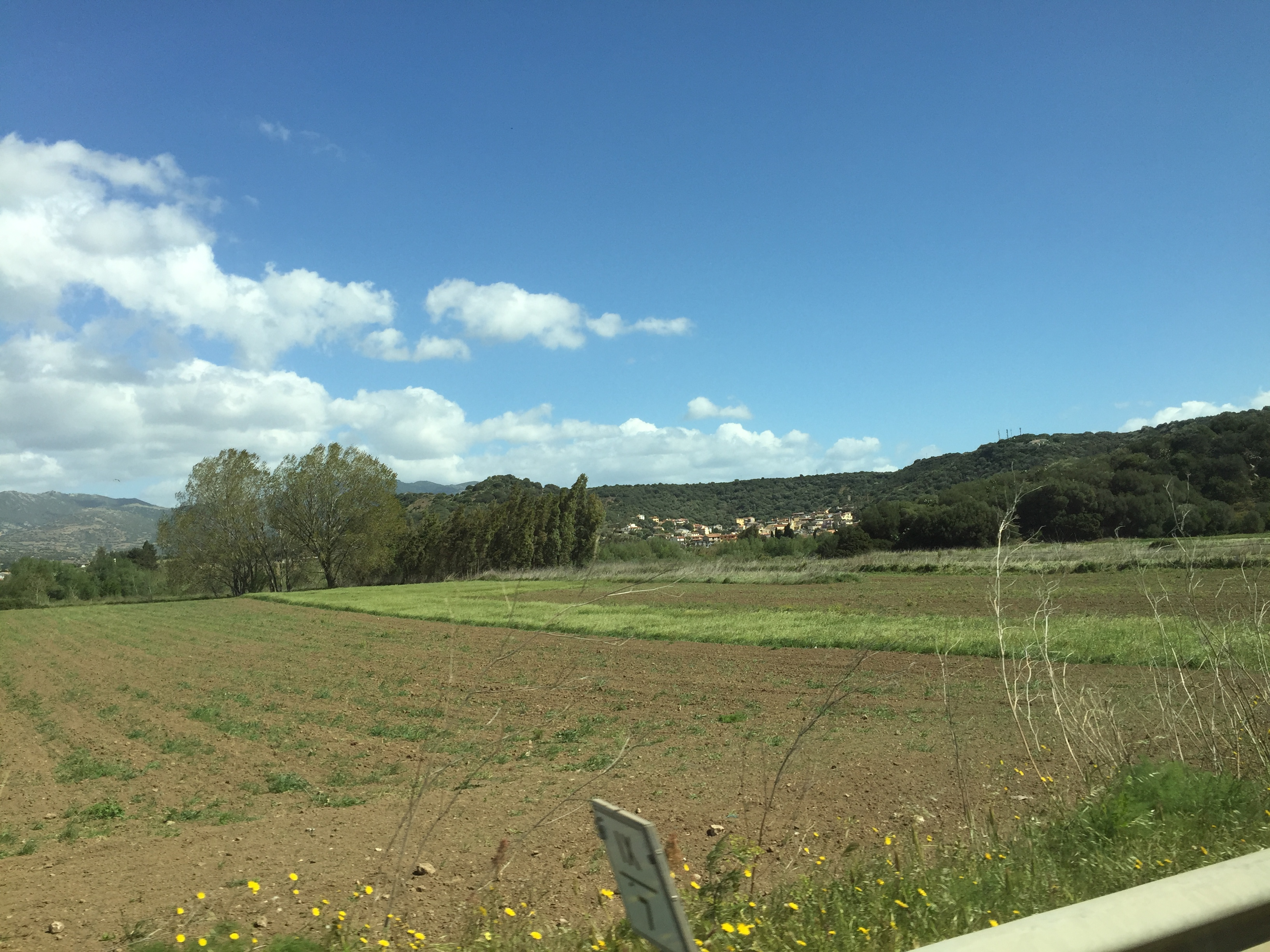
- View of Onifai

- Location within Sardinia
- Coordinates: 40°2′N 9°3′E
- Country: Italy
- Region: Sardinia
- Province: Nuoro (NU)

Area
  - Total: 43.19 km^{2} (16.68 sq mi)

Population (2026)
  - Total: 728
  - Density: 16.9/km^{2} (43.7/sq mi)
- Time zone: UTC+1 (CET)
  - Summer (DST): UTC+2 (CEST)
- Postal code: 08020
- Dialing code: 0437

Onifai (Sardinian: Oniai) is a village and comune (municipality) in the Province of Nuoro in the autonomous island region of Sardinia in Italy, located about 200 kilometres (120 mi) north of Cagliari, about 40 kilometres (25 mi) east of Nuoro and just 5 kilometres (3 mi) inland from the gulf of Orosei. It has 728 inhabitants.

The economy is based on agriculture and shepherding. Onifai is well known for its pecorino cheese (most production is exported to the European continent, United States and Canada) and vernaccia wine made with Cannonau grapes.

Onifai borders the municipalities of Galtellì, Irgoli, Orosei, and Siniscola.

== Demographics ==
As of 2026, the population is 728, of which 46.8% are male, and 53.2% are female. Minors make up 13.3% of the population, and seniors make up 29.7%.

Historical population

Year	Pop.	±%
1861	464	—
1871	448	−3.4%
1881	448	+0.0%
1901	517	+15.4%
1911	573	+10.8%
1921	597	+4.2%
1931	702	+17.6%
1936	761	+8.4%

Year	Pop.	±%
1951	888	+16.7%
1961	1,015	+14.3%
1971	847	−16.6%
1981	805	−5.0%
1991	746	−7.3%
2001	766	+2.7%
2011	742	−3.1%
2021	697	−6.1%

Source: ISTAT

=== Immigration ===
As of 2025, immigrants make up 7.9% of the population. The 5 largest foreign countries of birth are Pakistan, Romania, Switzerland, Morocco, and France.
