= Lula, Sardinia =

Lula Lùvula (Sardinian)
- Comune
- Comune di Lula
- Street in Lula with the town's church in the background

- Location within Sardinia
- Coordinates: 40°28′N 9°29′E
- Country: Italy
- Region: Sardinia
- Province: Nuoro (NU)

Government
  - Mayor: Mario Calia

Area
  - Total: 148.72 km^{2} (57.42 sq mi)
- Elevation: 521 m (1,709 ft)

Population (2026)
  - Total: 1,198
  - Density: 8.055/km^{2} (20.86/sq mi)
- Demonym: Lulesi
- Time zone: UTC+1 (CET)
  - Summer (DST): UTC+2 (CEST)
- Postal code: 08020
- Dialing code: 0784
- Website: Official website

Lula (Sardinian: Lùvula) is a town and comune (municipality) in the Province of Nuoro in the autonomous island region of Sardinia in Italy, located about 220 kilometres (140 mi) north of the regional capital Cagliari and about 40 kilometres (25 mi) northeast of the provincial capital Nuoro. It has 1,198 inhabitants.

Lula is located on the bottom of Mount Albo, a chain of white limestone, with numerous natural caves and stalactites.

Lula borders the municipalities of Bitti, Dorgali, Galtellì, Irgoli, Loculi, Lodè, Onanì, Orune, and Siniscola.

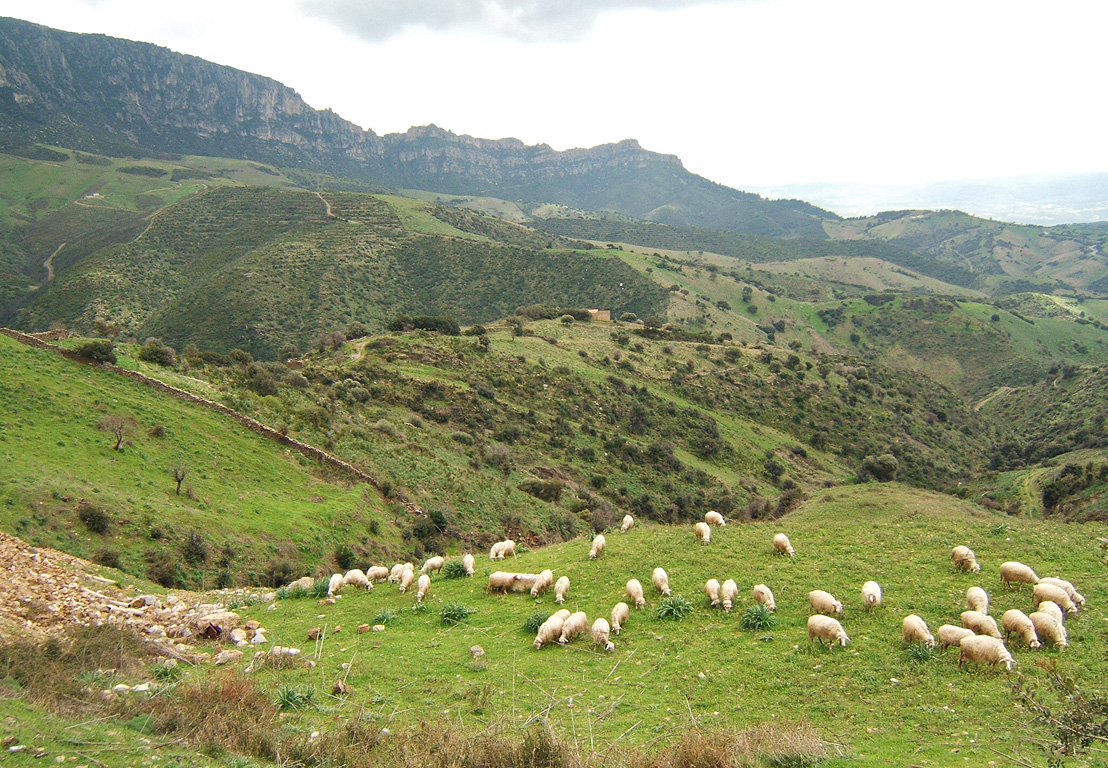
Sheep near Lula

== Demographics ==
As of 2026, the population is 1,198, of which 50.8% are male, and 49.2% are female. Minors make up 10.2% of the population, and seniors make up 28.9%.

Historical population

Year	Pop.	±%
1861	1,160	—
1871	1,249	+7.7%
1881	1,362	+9.0%
1901	1,796	+31.9%
1911	1,972	+9.8%
1921	1,907	−3.3%
1931	2,037	+6.8%
1936	2,000	−1.8%

Year	Pop.	±%
1951	2,214	+10.7%
1961	2,397	+8.3%
1971	2,112	−11.9%
1981	1,952	−7.6%
1991	1,791	−8.2%
2001	1,657	−7.5%
2011	1,495	−9.8%
2021	1,266	−15.3%

Source: ISTAT

=== immigration ===
As of 2025, immigrants make up 4.1% of the population. The 5 largest foreign countries of birth are Belgium, Romania, France, Brazil, and the United Kingdom.
