= Siniscola =

Siniscola Thiniscòle (Sardinian)
- Comune
- Comune di Siniscola
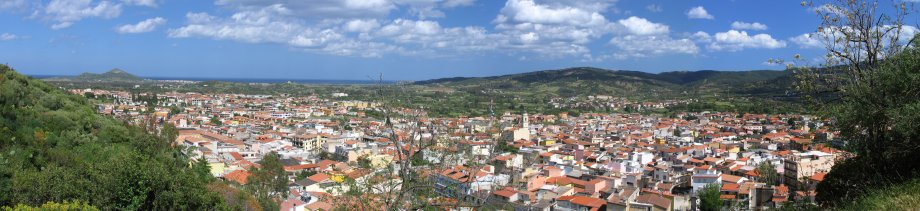
- View of Siniscola

- Coat of arms

- Location within Sardinia
- Coordinates: 40°35′N 9°42′E
- Country: Italy
- Region: Sardinia
- Province: Nuoro (NU)
- Frazioni: Berchida, Capo Comino, La Caletta, Santa Lucia, Iscra e Voes

Government
  - Mayor: Gian Luigi Farris

Area
  - Total: 196.38 km^{2} (75.82 sq mi)
- Elevation: 40 m (130 ft)

Population (2026)
  - Total: 11,139
  - Density: 56.722/km^{2} (146.91/sq mi)
- Demonym: Siniscolesi
- Time zone: UTC+1 (CET)
  - Summer (DST): UTC+2 (CEST)
- Postal code: 08029
- Dialing code: 0784
- Patron saint: St. John the Baptist
- Saint day: June 24
- Website: Official website

Siniscola (Italian: [siniˈskɔːla]; Sardinian: Thiniscòle [θiniˈskɔlɛ]) is a town and comune (municipality) in the province of Nuoro in the autonomous island region of Sardinia in Italy, located about 160 kilometres (99 mi) northeast of Cagliari and about 45 kilometres (28 mi) northeast of Nuoro. It has 11,139 inhabitants.

Siniscola borders the municipalities of Irgoli, Lodè, Lula, Onifai, Orosei, Posada, and Torpè.

== Demographics ==
As of 2026, the population is 11,139, of which 50.5% are male, and 49.5% are female. Minors make up 14.1% of the population, and seniors make up 25.8%.

Historical population

Year	Pop.	±%
1861	2,664	—
1871	2,716	+2.0%
1881	2,819	+3.8%
1901	3,676	+30.4%
1911	3,764	+2.4%
1921	3,846	+2.2%
1931	4,481	+16.5%
1936	4,852	+8.3%

Year	Pop.	±%
1951	5,705	+17.6%
1961	6,559	+15.0%
1971	7,013	+6.9%
1981	9,080	+29.5%
1991	10,377	+14.3%
2001	10,954	+5.6%
2011	11,469	+4.7%
2021	11,245	−2.0%

Source: ISTAT

=== Immigration ===
As of 2025, immigrants make up 8.6% of the population. The 5 largest foreign countries of birth are Belgium, Germany, Morocco, Senegal, and Romania.

== Sights ==
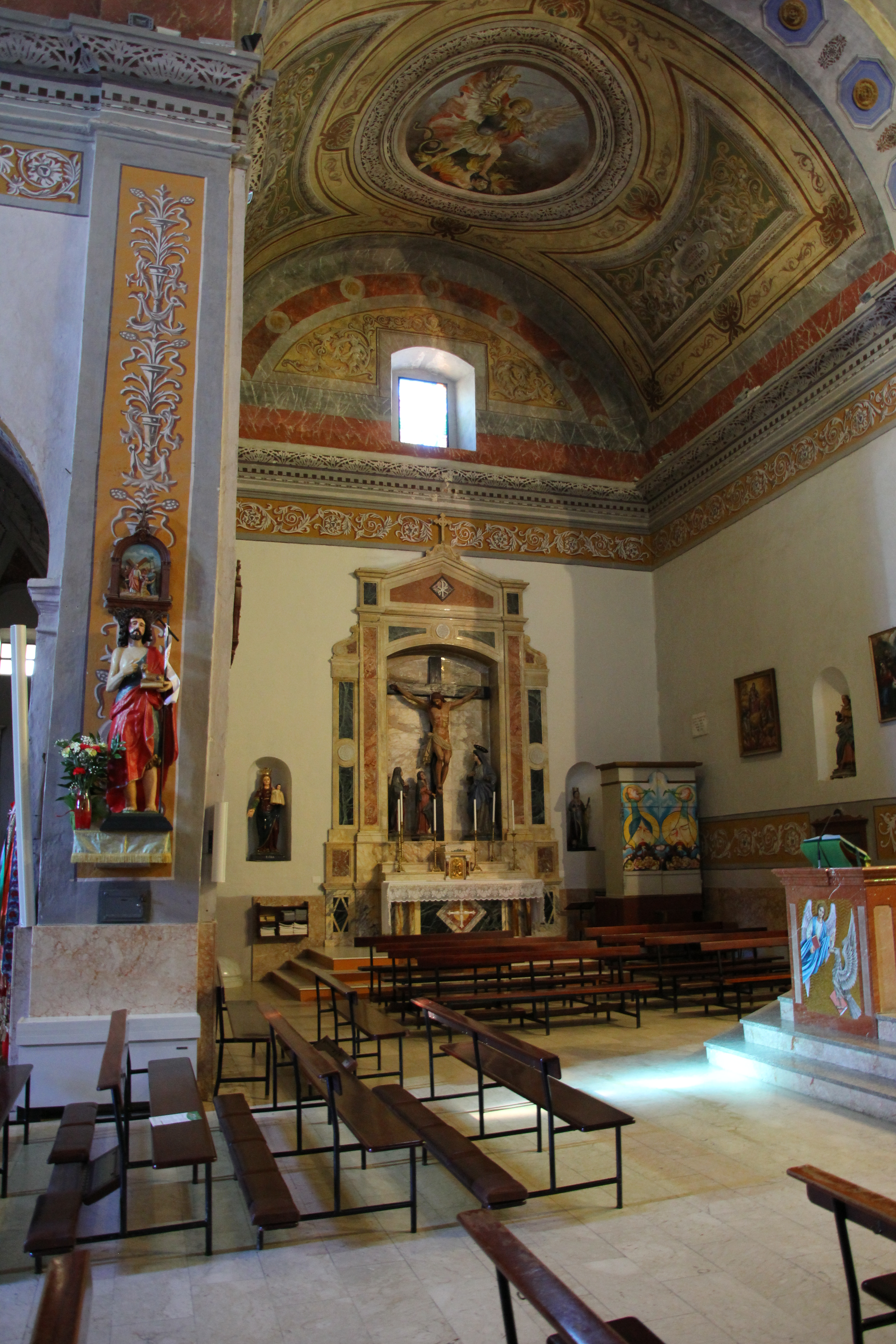
Church of San Giovanni Battista

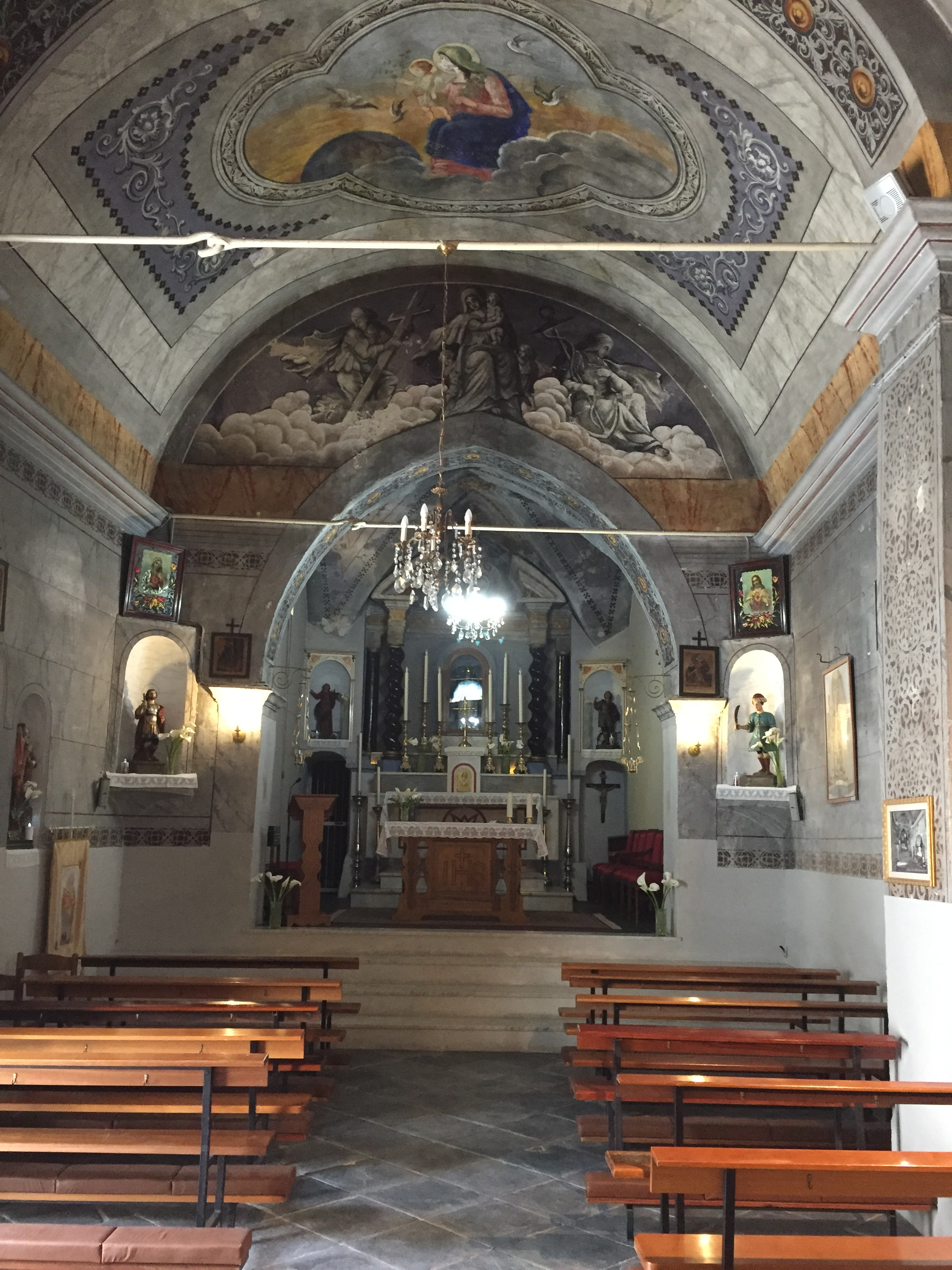
Church of Madonna delle Grazie

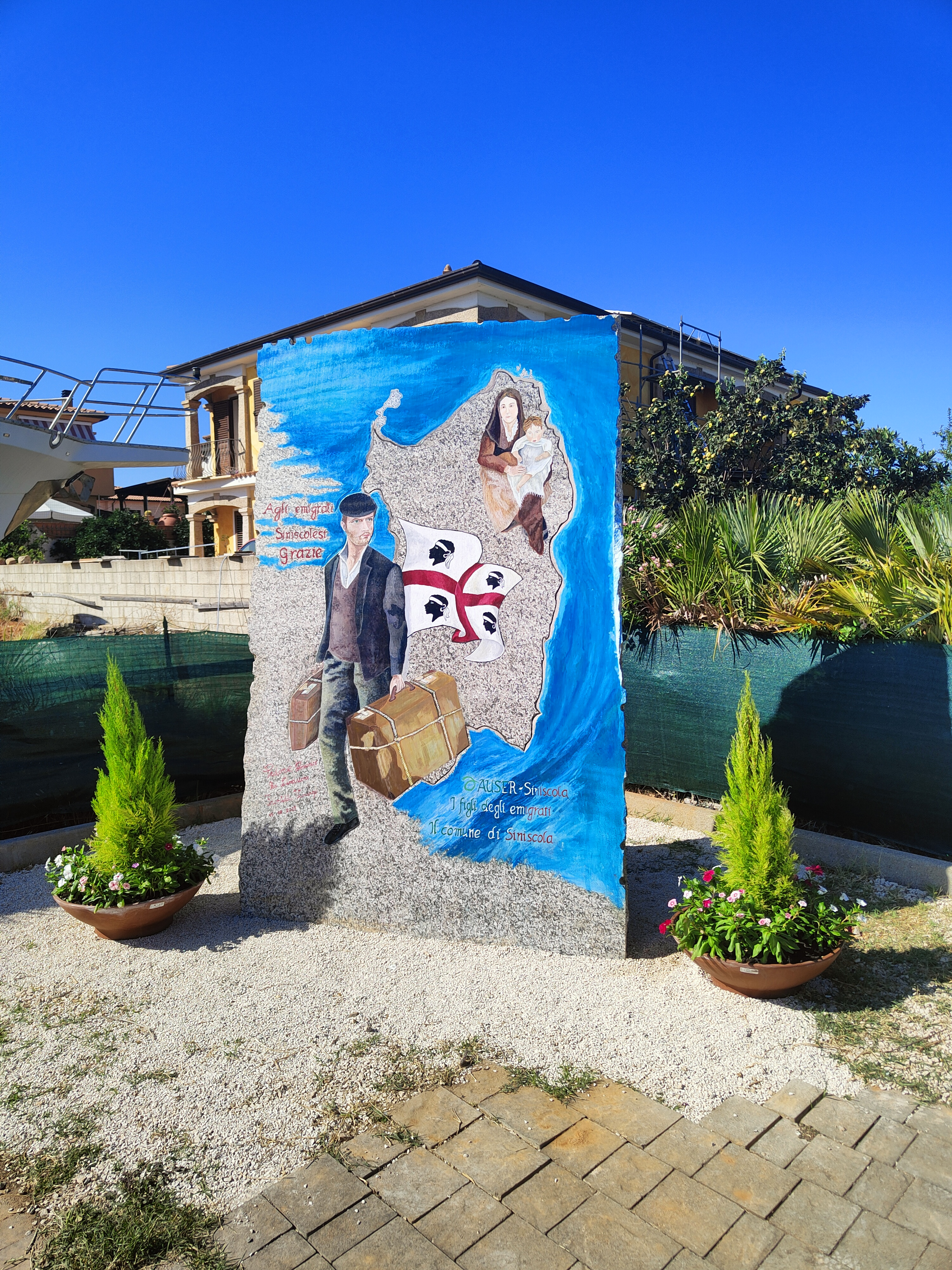
Monument to emigrants of Siniscola, at the entrance to the town

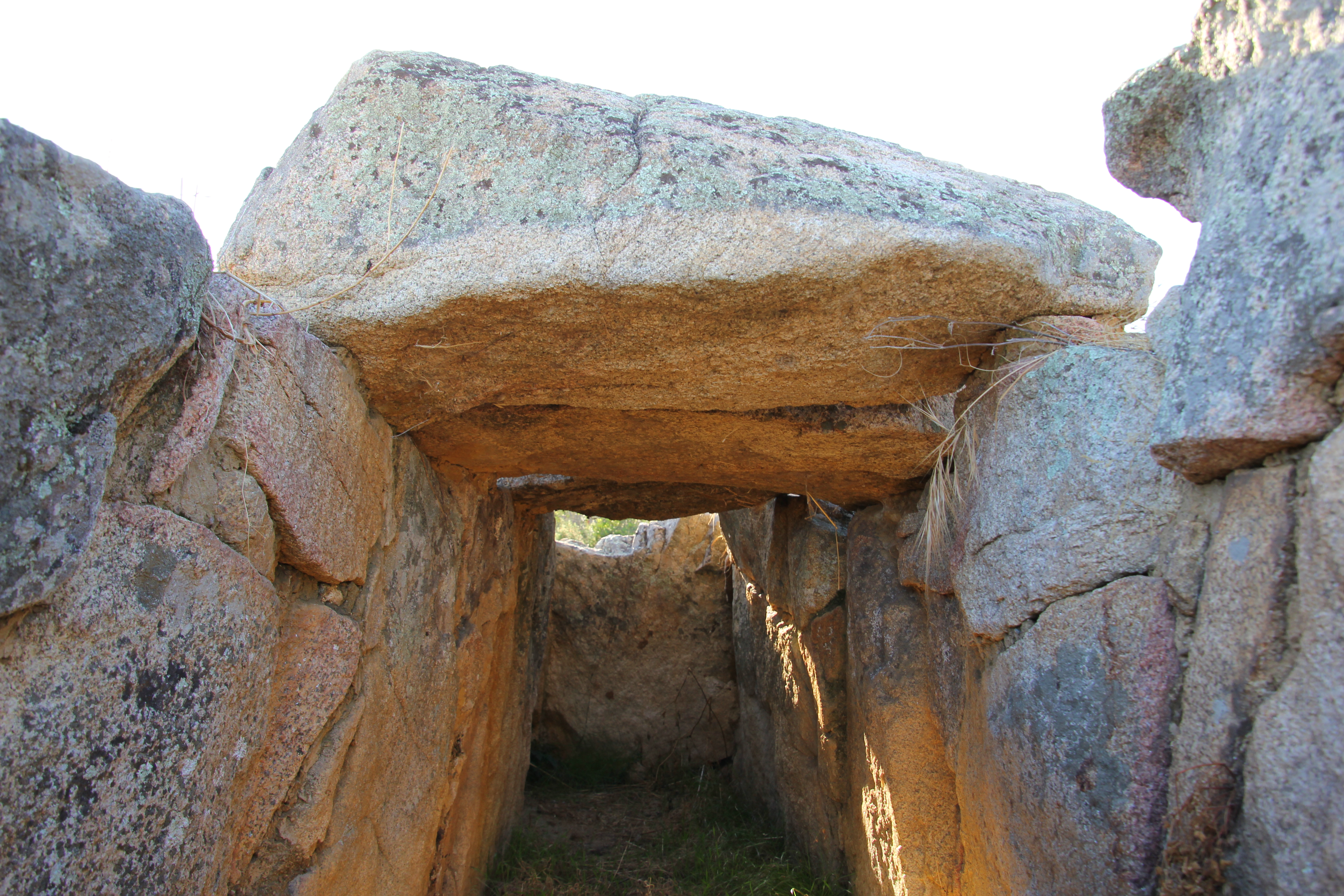
Tomb of the giants of Su Picante

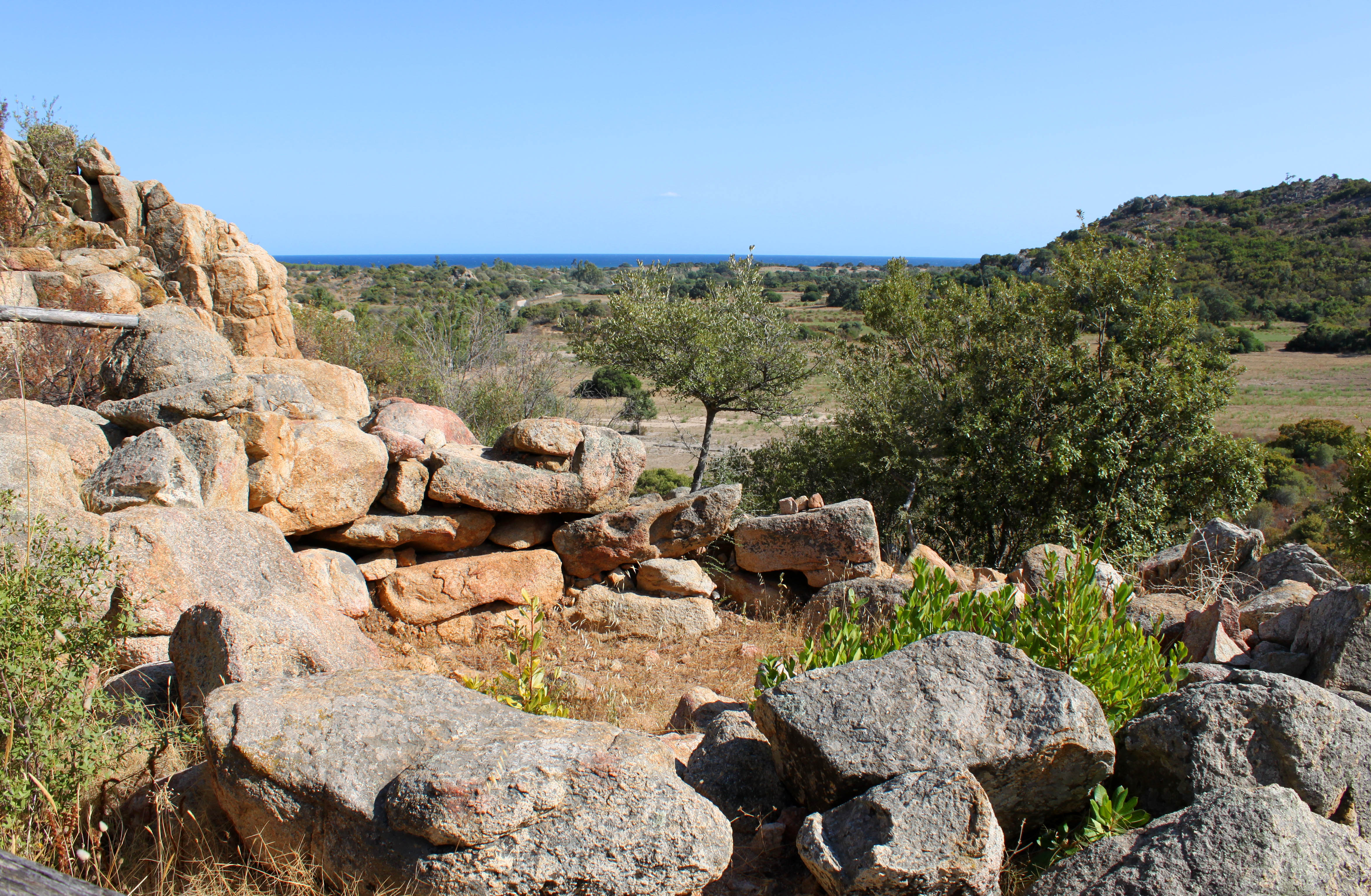
Nuraghe Conca Umosa

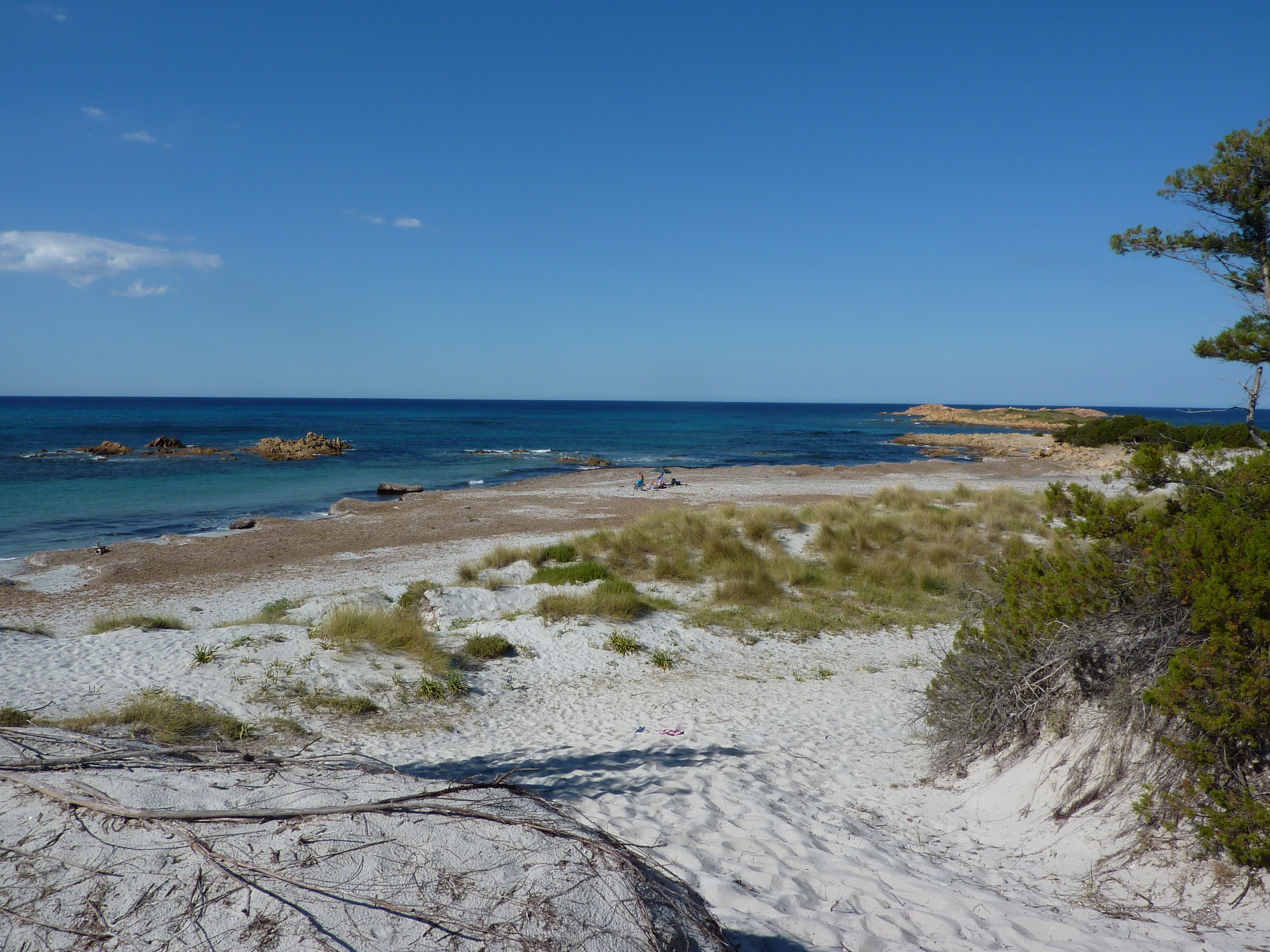
Capo Comino beach

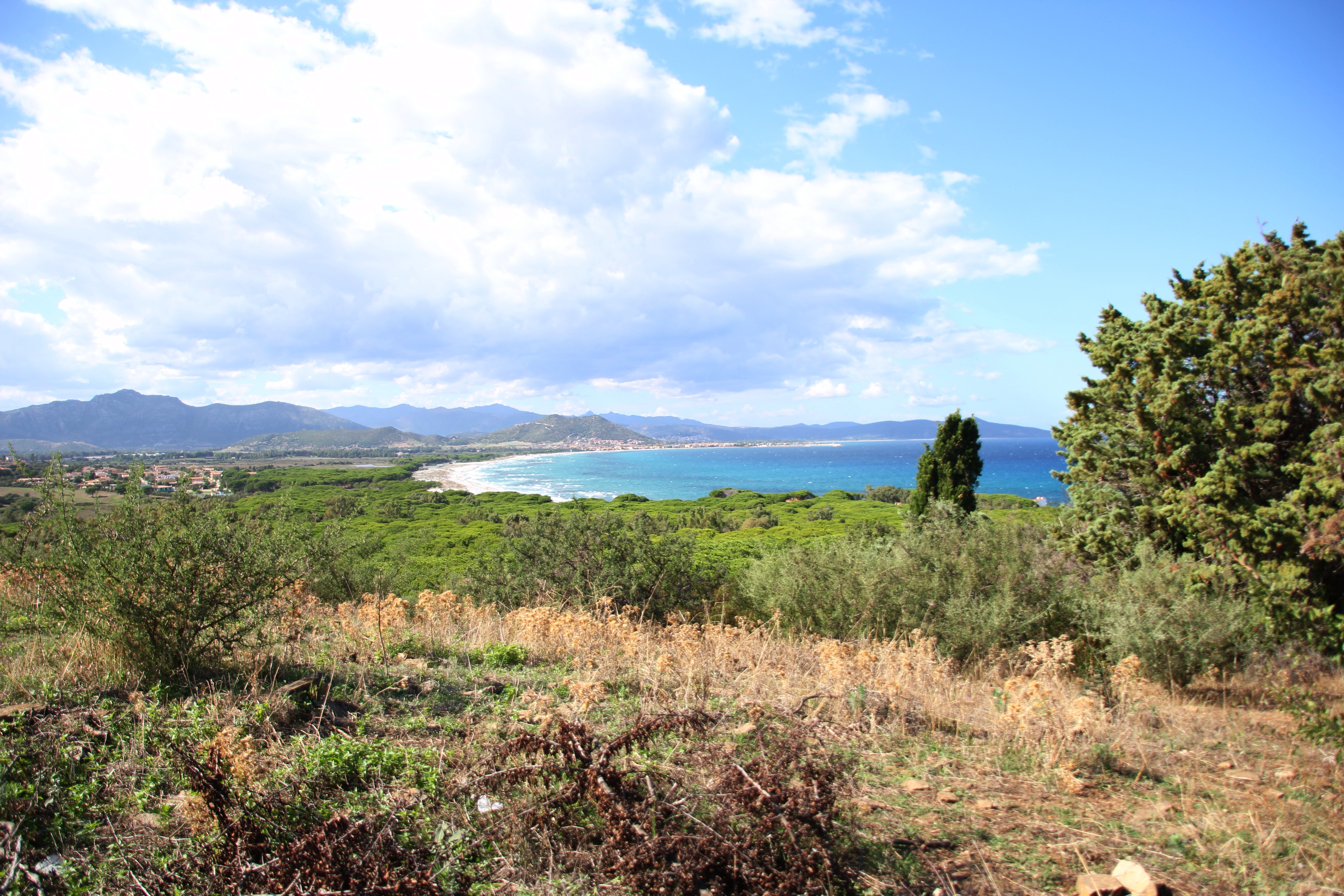
La Caletta beach
