= Irgoli =

Irgoli Irgòli (Sardinian)
- Comune
- Comune di Irgoli
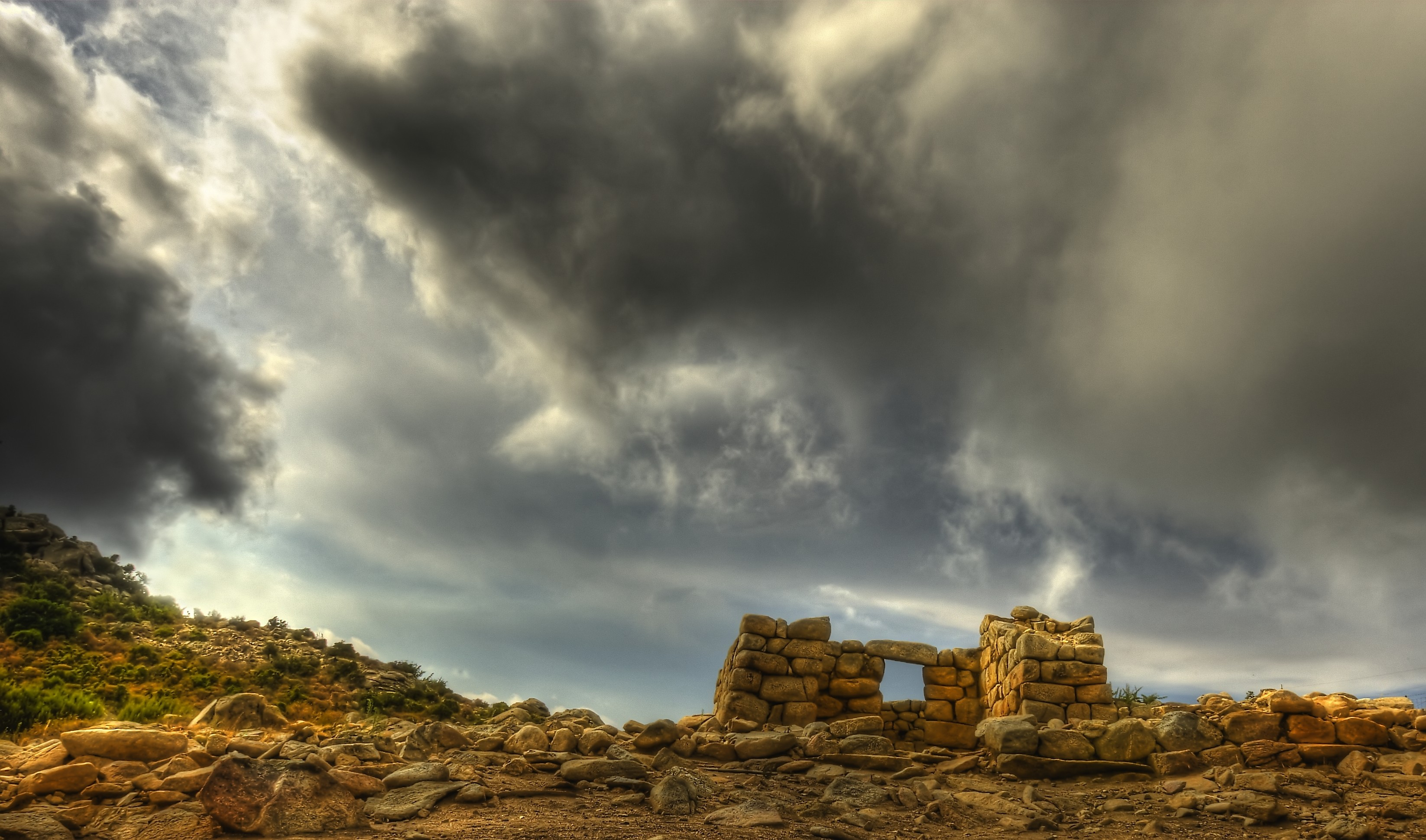
- Nuraghe sanctuary

- Location within Sardinia
- Coordinates: 40°25′N 9°38′E
- Country: Italy
- Region: Sardinia
- Province: Nuoro (NU)

Government
  - Mayor: Giovanni Porcu

Area
  - Total: 75.30 km^{2} (29.07 sq mi)
- Elevation: 26 m (85 ft)

Population (2026)
  - Total: 2,194
  - Density: 29.14/km^{2} (75.46/sq mi)
- Demonym: Irgolesi
- Time zone: UTC+1 (CET)
  - Summer (DST): UTC+2 (CEST)
- Postal code: 08020
- Dialing code: 0784
- Website: Official website

Irgoli (Sardinian: Irgòli) is a town and comune (municipality) in the Province of Nuoro in the autonomous island region of Sardinia in Italy, located about 140 kilometres (87 mi) northeast of Cagliari and about 30 kilometres (19 mi) northeast of Nuoro. It has 2,194 inhabitants.

Irgoli borders the municipalities of Galtellì, Loculi, Lula, Onifai, and Siniscola.

== Demographics ==
As of 2026, the population is 2,194, of which 50.0% are male, and 50.0% are female. Minors make up 14.5% of the population, and seniors make up 26.3%.

Historical population

Year	Pop.	±%
1861	662	—
1871	767	+15.9%
1881	823	+7.3%
1901	884	+7.4%
1911	1,046	+18.3%
1921	1,006	−3.8%
1931	1,171	+16.4%
1936	1,292	+10.3%

Year	Pop.	±%
1951	1,745	+35.1%
1961	2,006	+15.0%
1971	1,888	−5.9%
1981	2,069	+9.6%
1991	2,269	+9.7%
2001	2,294	+1.1%
2011	2,345	+2.2%
2021	2,232	−4.8%

Source: ISTAT

=== Immigration ===
As of 2025, immigrants make up 3.3% of the population. The 5 largest foreign countries of birth are Germany, France, Romania, Senegal, and Albania.

== Sources ==
- Talbert, Richard, ed. (2000). "Map 48". Barrington Atlas of the Greek and Roman World. Princeton University Press. ISBN 978-0-691-03169-9.
