= Galtellì =

Galtellì Garteddi (Sardinian)
- Comune
- Comune di Galtellì
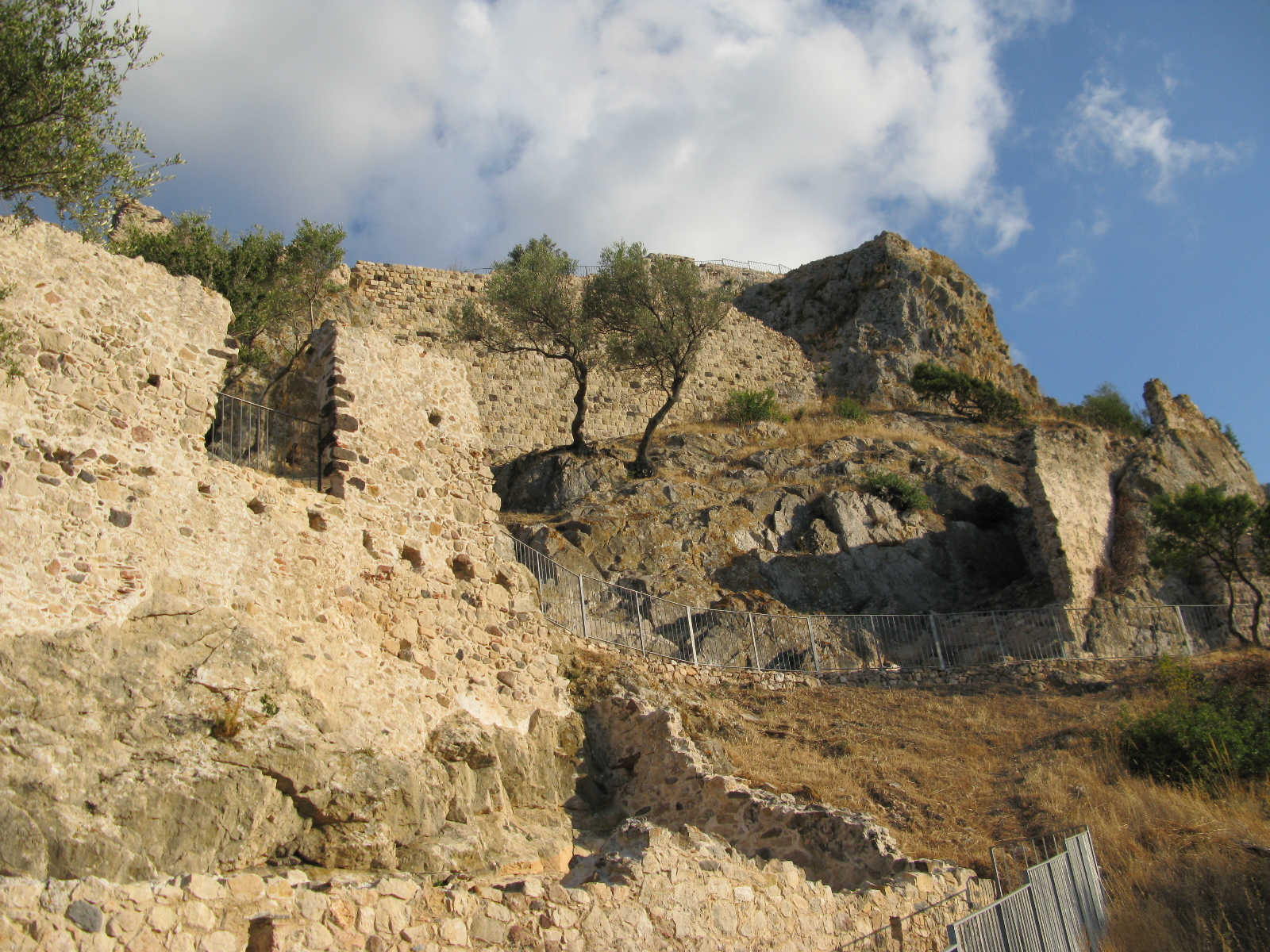
- Ruins of the Castle of Pontes

- Location within Sardinia
- Coordinates: 40°23′N 9°37′E
- Country: Italy
- Region: Sardinia
- Province: Nuoro (NU)

Government
  - Mayor: Giovanni Santo Porcu

Area
  - Total: 56.53 km^{2} (21.83 sq mi)
- Elevation: 35 m (115 ft)

Population (2026)
  - Total: 2,377
  - Density: 42.05/km^{2} (108.9/sq mi)
- Demonym: Galtellinesi
- Time zone: UTC+1 (CET)
  - Summer (DST): UTC+2 (CEST)
- Postal code: 08020
- Dialing code: 0784
- Website: Official website

Galtellì (Italian: [ɡaltelˈli]; Sardinian: Garteddi) is a town and comune (municipality) in the Province of Nuoro in the autonomous island region of Sardinia in Italy, located about 140 kilometres (87 mi) northeast of Cagliari and about 25 kilometres (16 mi) northeast of Nuoro. It has 2,377 inhabitants.

Galtellì was a historic episcopal see, in the current diocese of Nuoro, in the territory of the ancient sentence of Gallura and, in particular, in the territory of the Baronie.

Galtellì has one of the better-preserved historic centres in Sardinia. It has numerous churches, and the cathedral of Saint Peter houses a cycle of Romanesque frescoes.

Galtellì borders the municipalities of Dorgali, Irgoli, Loculi, Lula, Onifai, and Orosei.

== Demographics ==
As of 2026, the population is 2,377, of which 49.3% are male, and 50.7% are female. Minors make up 15.7% of the population, and seniors make up 24.7%.

Historical population

Year	Pop.	±%
1861	771	—
1871	819	+6.2%
1881	826	+0.9%
1901	907	+9.8%
1911	1,015	+11.9%
1921	1,107	+9.1%
1931	1,300	+17.4%
1936	1,350	+3.8%

Year	Pop.	±%
1951	1,879	+39.2%
1961	2,096	+11.5%
1971	2,177	+3.9%
1981	2,290	+5.2%
1991	2,299	+0.4%
2001	2,344	+2.0%
2011	2,472	+5.5%
2021	2,384	−3.6%

Source: ISTAT

=== Immigration ===
As of 2025, immigrants make up 2.9% of the population. The 5 largest foreign countries of birth are France, Germany, Romania, the United Kingdom, and Albania.
