= Trolleybuses in Cagliari =

Public transit system in Sardinia, Italy

Cagliari trolleybus system
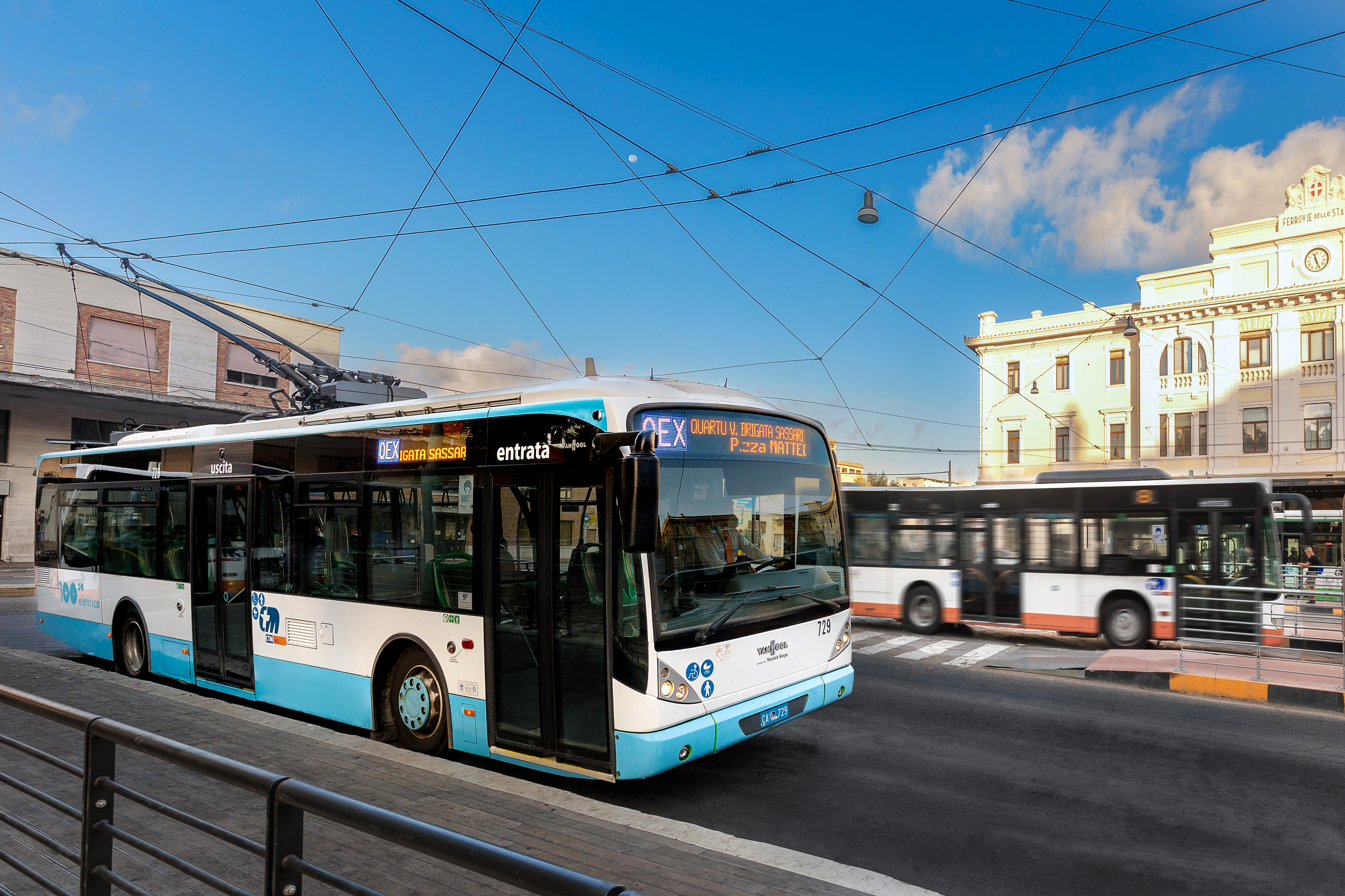
- One of Cagliari's Van Hool trolleybuses on route QEX in 2022

Operation
- Locale: Cagliari, Sardinia, Italy
- Open: 22 December 1952
- Routes: 4 (including one summer-only variant)
- Operator: CTM (Cagliari)

Infrastructure
- Electrification: 750 V DC parallel overhead lines

Statistics
Overview
- Website: http://www.ctmcagliari.it/ CTM (in Italian)

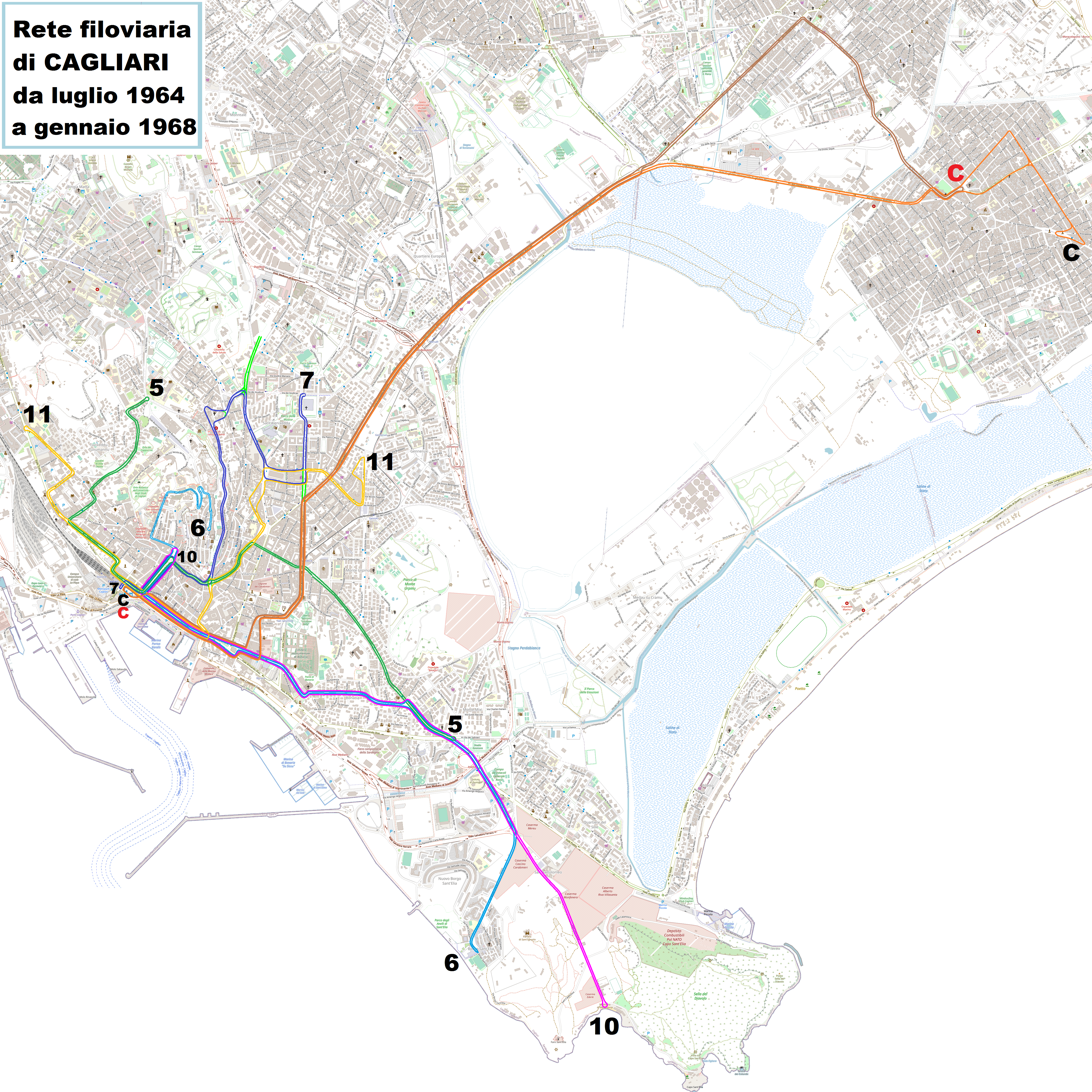
Map of system in 1968

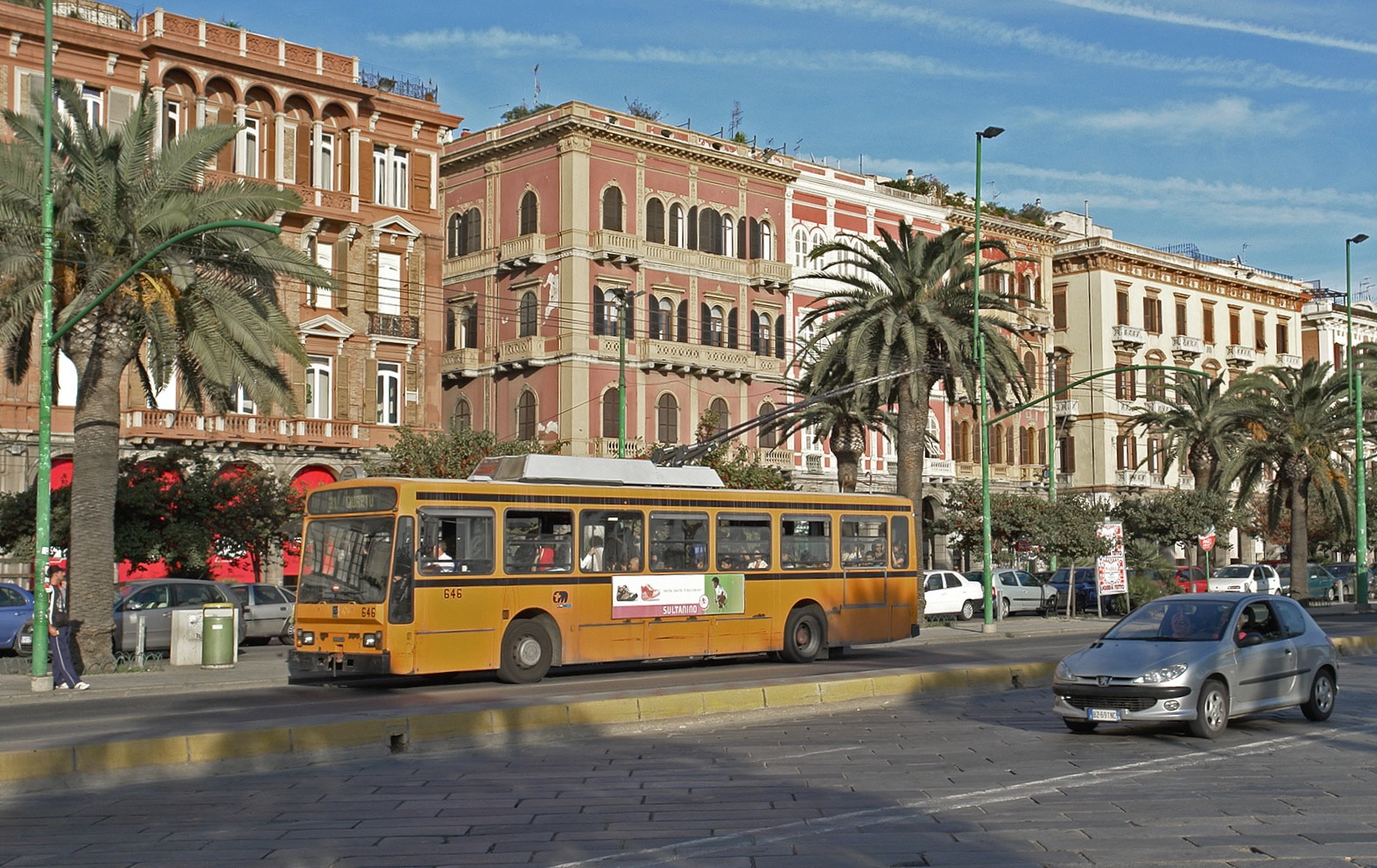
A Socimi 8845 trolleybus in the busway next to Via Roma, in central Cagliari

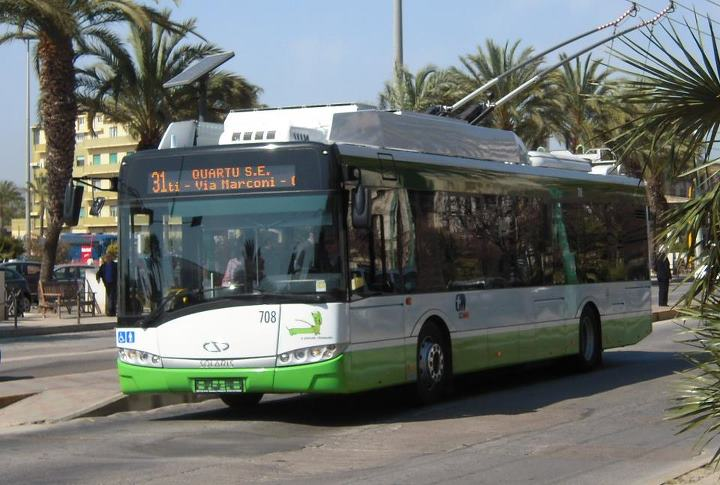
A Solaris Trollino on route 31 in 2012

The Cagliari trolleybus system (Italian: Rete filoviaria di Cagliari) forms part of the public transport network of the city and comune of Cagliari and the Metropolitan City of Cagliari, in the region of Sardinia, Italy.

In operation since 1952, the system presently comprises four routes, including one summer-only variant, serving the city and the surrounding comuni.

== History ==
=== 20th century ===
The first trolleybus route in Cagliari opened on 22 December 1952. Additional routes were constructed in the mid-1950s. Route 6 (Borgo Sant'Elia – Piazza Martini) opened on 30 July 1956, and after a short time was extended in the central area from Piazza Martini to Piazza Palazzo. By September 1957, three more routes had opened: route 5 (Piazza d'Armi – Stadio Amsicora), route 7 (Stazione FS – Piazza Pirri), and route 10 (Stazione FS – Calamosca). An interurban route to Quartu Sant'Elena via followed on 18 March 1962, served by services C-nero and C-rosso (C-black and C-red). The last new routes to open were route 11 (Piazza Trento – Via Palestrina, the latter terminus being later known as Via Rossini), in July 1962, and subsequently route 12 (Piazza d'Armi – Colle San Michele). By 1968, 33 kilometres (21 miles) of routes were in operation. Route 10 took over route 6's section to Piazza Palazzo in 1969. The first route closure occurred in 1971, of route 10, though much of its eastern section continued to be covered by route 6, and soon route 6 was also extended to cover route 11's northern section to Via Rossini, after the withdrawal of route 11. Closures continued later in the 1970s, and by 1983, only routes 5, C-black, and C-red remained in operation with trolleybuses. By at least 1994 (and probably in 1990), route 5 had been converted to motorbuses, and the only routes still operating with trolleybuses were the two suburban services connecting Cagliari with Quartu, which by that time had been re-designated CD and CS. Route 5 returned to being trolleybus-operated in 1998 after several years of being a motorbus route.

=== 21st century ===
In October 2002, route 5 was extended from Piazza d'Armi to Parco San Michele (also known as Colle San Michele), a route section that had been trolleybus route 12 many years earlier. From 2002 until 2022, the Cagliari trolleybus system comprised the following three routes:

- 5 – Parco San Michele – San Bartolomeo
- 30 – Cagliari (Piazza Matteotti) – Selargius – Quartu Sant'Elena – Cagliari (Piazza Matteotti)
- 31 – Cagliari (Piazza Matteotti) – Quartu Sant'Elena – Selargius – Cagliari (Piazza Matteotti)

A new summer-only route 5Z (later referred to as 5ZE, short for 5-ZeEUS) was introduced in June 2016, covering the eastern half of route 5 but extending beyond San Bartolomeo, to Poetto. Its outermost section, between Via Vergine di Lluc (along route 5) and Poetto, is not equipped with overhead trolley wires, and the trolleybuses cover it on battery power – a feature added to the fleet in the mid-2010s, with the newest vehicles (the last two Solaris vehicles and last four Van Hool units).

Following a reorganisation of service on the routes to Quartu Sant'Elena in September 2022, the following four routes are currently operated:

- 5 – Parco San Michele – San Bartolomeo
- 5ZE – Lungomare Poetto – Cinquini (summer-only operation)
- 30 – Cagliari (Piazza Matteotti) – Selargius – Quartu Sant'Elena
- QEX – Cagliari (Piazza Matteotti) – Quartu Sant'Elena (direct routing along Via Marconi both ways)

For several years, since at least the 1990s, there was no trolleybus operation on the system on Sundays. This remains the case for most of the year, but starting in June 2016, routes 5 and summer-only 5ZE have been trolleybus-operated on Sundays every summer, through at least summer 2019. For the non-summer schedule periods, running from September or October to June each year, route 5 is replaced by motorbus route 5-11 (incorporating part of bus route 11) on Sundays and operated by motorbuses, a practice CTM had followed year-round from 2006 to 2016.

== Fleet ==
=== Retired fleet ===
- Fiat 668 Cansa (9 trolleybuses, nos. 501 to 509); served from 1952 to summer 1972.
- Fiat 2405 Casaro (11 trolleybuses, nos 551 to 561); served from 1955 to 1986. The only remaining example, no. 552, is kept at the National Museum of Transport^{IT} in La Spezia.
- Fiat 2405 Lancia Esatau P (6 trolleybuses, nos. 562 to 567); served from 1957 to 1971.
- Fiat 2405 Casaro (25 trolleybuses, nos. 568 to 592), served from 1962 to 1989.
- Inbus F140 (15 trolleybuses, nos. 601 to 615); served from 1981 to 2003, dismantled in 2008.
- Socimi 8839 (20 trolleybuses, nos. 616 to 635); entered service in 1986-87 season, dismantled in 2012.
- Socimi 8845 (16 trolleybuses, nos. 636 to 651); entered service in 1991-92 season; six were still active as of mid-2014, but the last three in service were withdrawn on 1 July 2016.

=== Current fleet ===
The present fleet comprises the following 32 trolleybuses:

- Solaris Trollino 12 (18 trolleybuses, nos. 701–718); first 16 entered service between March and June 2012, and two additional units purchased in 2015 (nos. 717–718) entered service in March 2016.
- Van Hool A330T (14 trolleybuses, nos. 719–732); order placed in May 2014, and delivery began in September 2015; entered service in July and August 2016.

Six of the 32 trolleybuses are equipped with batteries giving them the ability to operate in service on battery power for part of each trip, along route sections not equipped with overhead wiring. These are the last two Solaris vehicles (nos. 717–718) and the last four Van Hool vehicles (nos. 729–732). They are the only trolleybuses that are able to serve route 5ZE.

== See also ==
- Cagliari railway station
- List of trolleybus systems in Italy
