= FS Class 744 =

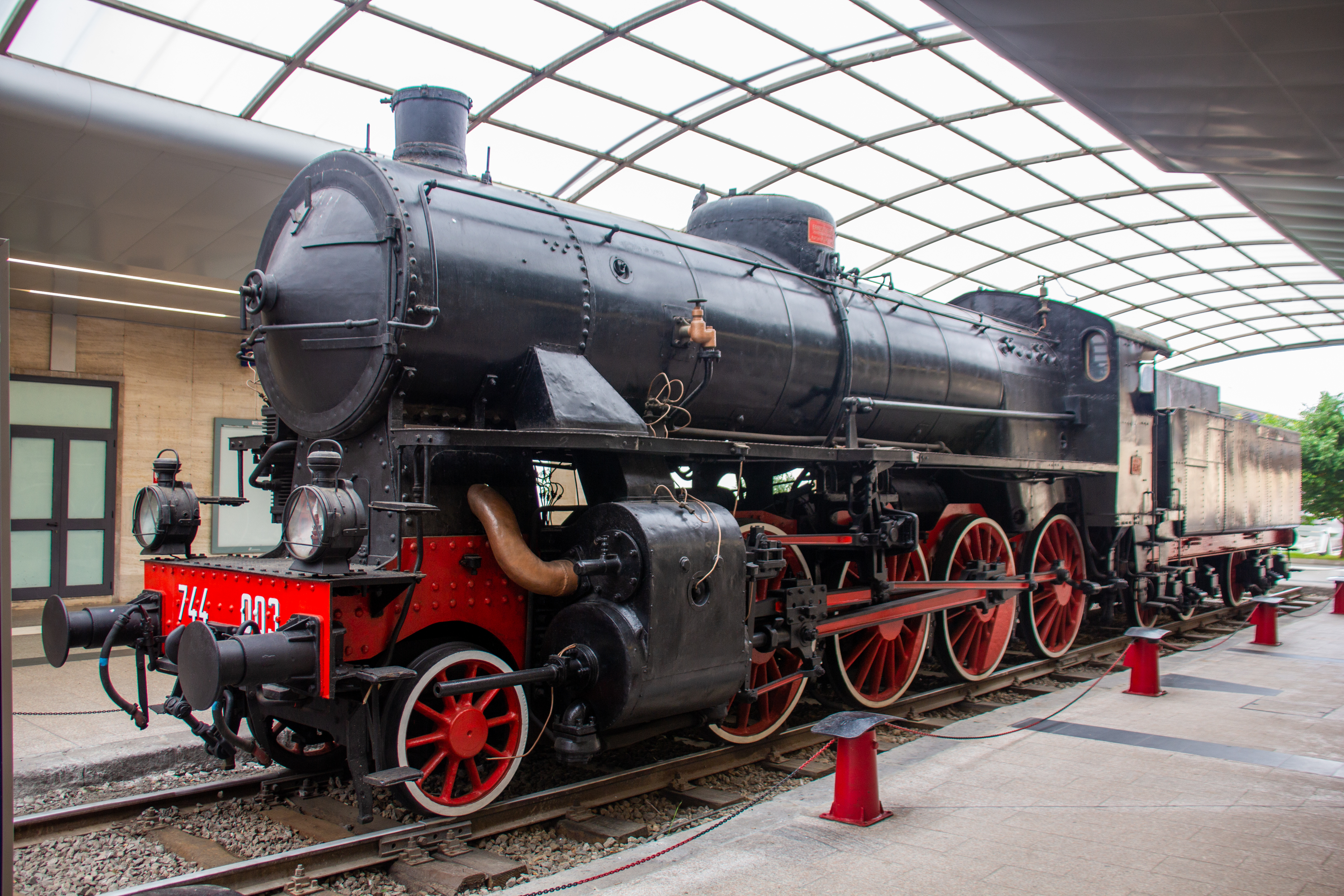
- FS Class 744.003 as preserved at Cagliari railway station
Type and origin
- Power type: Steam
- Builder: Gio. Ansaldo & C. (15), Ernesto Breda (25), Officine Meccaniche (10)
- Build date: 1927-1928
- Total produced: 50
Specifications
- Configuration
  - Whyte: 2-8-0
  - UIC: 1'D h2
- Gauge: 1,435 mm (4 ft 8 1/2 in) standard gauge
- Leading dia.: 960 mm (3 ft 1 3/4 in)
- Driver dia.: 1,630 mm (5 ft 4 1/8 in)
- Length: 11,615 mm (38 ft 1 1/4 in)
- Axle load: 14.6 tonnes (14.4 long tons; 16.1 short tons)
- Loco weight: 70.2 tonnes (69.1 long tons; 77.4 short tons)
- Tender weight: 50 tonnes (49 long tons; 55 short tons)
- Fuel type: Coal
- Fuel capacity: 6,000 kg (13,000 lb)
- Water cap.: 22,000 litres (4,800 imp gal; 5,800 US gal)
- Firebox
  - Grate area: 3.5 m^{2} (38 sq ft)
- Boiler pressure: 12 kg/cm^{2} (11.8 bar; 171 psi)
- Heating surface: 191.7 m^{2} (2,063 sq ft)
- Superheater
  - Heating area: 50.5 m^{2} (544 sq ft)
- Cylinders: Two, simple
- Cylinder size: 600 mm × 720 mm (23 5/8 in × 28 3/8 in)
- Valve gear: Walschaerts, Caprotti
Performance figures
- Maximum speed: 80 km/h (50 mph)
- Power output: 1,400 CV (1,030 kW; 1,380 hp)
- Tractive effort: 14,800 kgf (145 kN; 32,600 lbf)

The Ferrovie dello Stato (FS; Italian State Railways) Class 744 (Italian: Gruppo 744) is a class of 2-8-0 steam locomotives; they were the last orthodox steam locomotives built for the FS.

== Design and construction ==
The Class 744 derived from the earlier Class 745 locomotives, with which they shared the boiler and the wheelbase; they were only partially successful, as their inside cylinders (chosen to keep the axle load as low as possible) forced the use of inadequately dimensioned big ends, which tended to run hot. The weight limits had been subsequently relaxed, and a 14.6 tons (later elevated to 14.85 for the Caprotti locomotives) axle load was permitted; this allowed the designers to place the two cylinders outside, avoiding the issue altogether.

The first batch of 25 locomotives was outshopped by Breda in 1927, and had Walschaerts valve gear. The subsequent 25 locomotives were built by Ansaldo (15) and Officine Meccaniche (10) in 1928, and were all fitted with Caprotti valve gear; these were originally classified Class 743, but in 1930 they were reclassified Class 744.1XX.

== Operations and modifications ==
Designed for mixed traffic working, the Class 744 was mainly allocated to southern Italy, with eighteen of them stationed at Salerno for service on the Salerno–Reggio di Calabria railway, and a further twenty at Palermo and Catania. After the Tyrrhenian line was electrified, some locomotives were transferred to northern Italy, while others were assigned to Sardinia. In 1956 the 744.024 was experimentally fitted with a Giesl ejector. The Class 744 was completely withdrawn from service in the 1970s.

== Preservation ==
Two Class 744 locomotives have survived into preservation:

- The 744.003, with Walschaerts valve gear, is preserved as a static exhibit at Cagliari railway station;
- The 744.118, with Caprotti valve gear, was initially kept at the National Railway Museum of Pietrarsa, before being transferred to Pistoia, pending a possible restoration to active service for heritage trains.

== Bibliography ==
- Cornolò, Giovanni (July 2014). "Locomotive a vapore". TuttoTreno (3).
- Kalla-Bishop, P. M. (1986). Italian State Railways Steam Locomotives. Abingdon: Tourret Publishing. p. 73. ISBN 0-905878-03-5.
