= Cagliari railway station =

Railway station in Sardinia, Italy

Cagliari
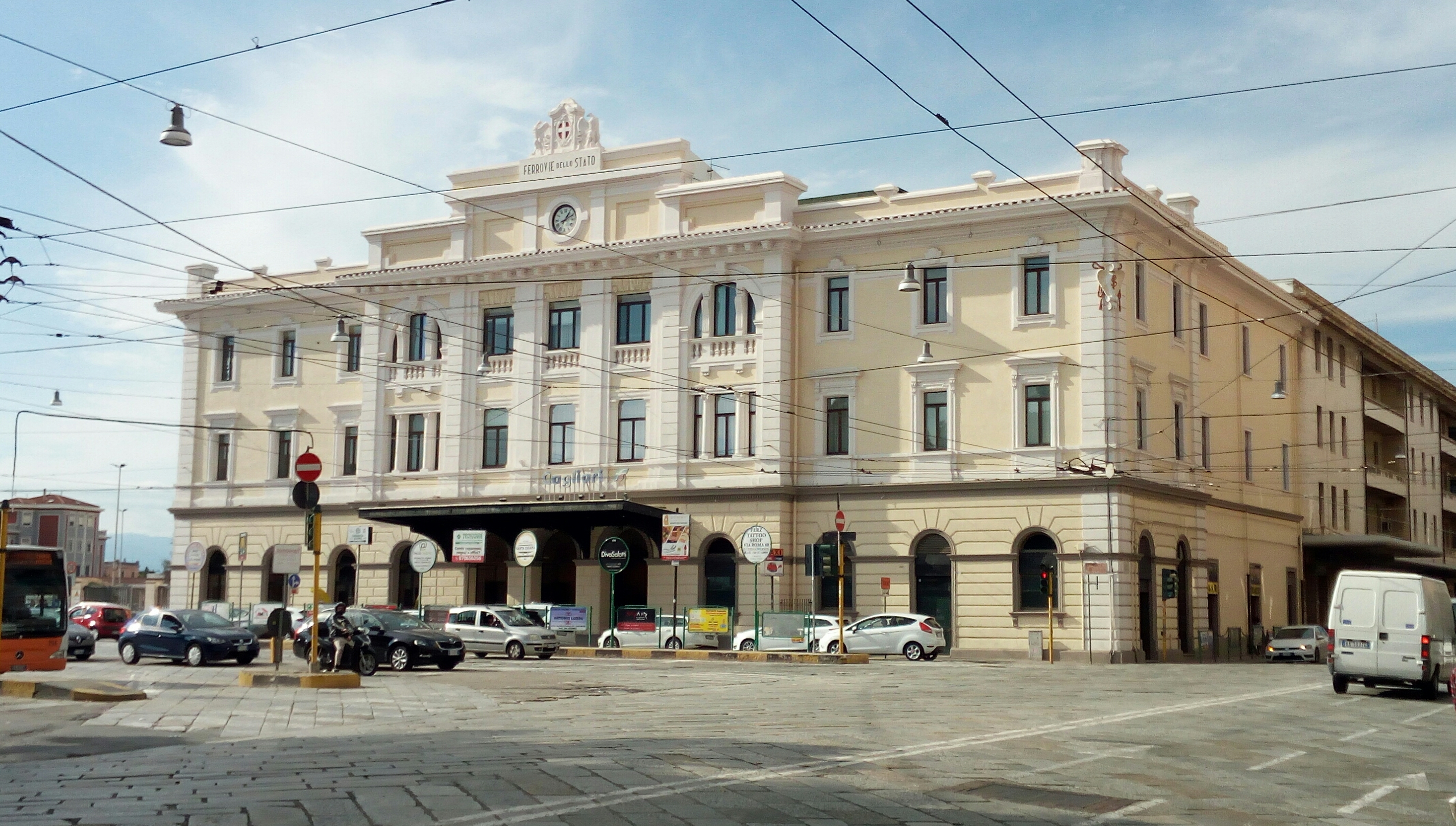
- Exterior of the station building.

General information
- Location: Piazza Matteotti; 09123 Cagliari; Cagliari, Cagliari, Sardinia; Italy
- Coordinates: 39°12′56″N 9°6′32″E
- Operator: Rete Ferroviaria Italiana; Centostazioni
- Line: Cagliari-Oristano-Olbia-Golfo Aranci
- Platforms: 4 (8 tracks)
- Train operators: Trenitalia
- Connections: CTM trolleybuses, and CTM and ARST buses

History
- Opened: 1879; 147 years ago
Location
- Location within Sardinia

Cagliari is the main railway station of the Italian city of Cagliari, the capital of Sardinia. It is owned by the Ferrovie dello Stato, the national rail company of Italy, and is the most important station of its region. The station is sometimes unofficially named Cagliari Centrale and Cagliari Piazza Matteotti. This second name is due to the station's position on Giacomo Matteotti Square.

== History ==
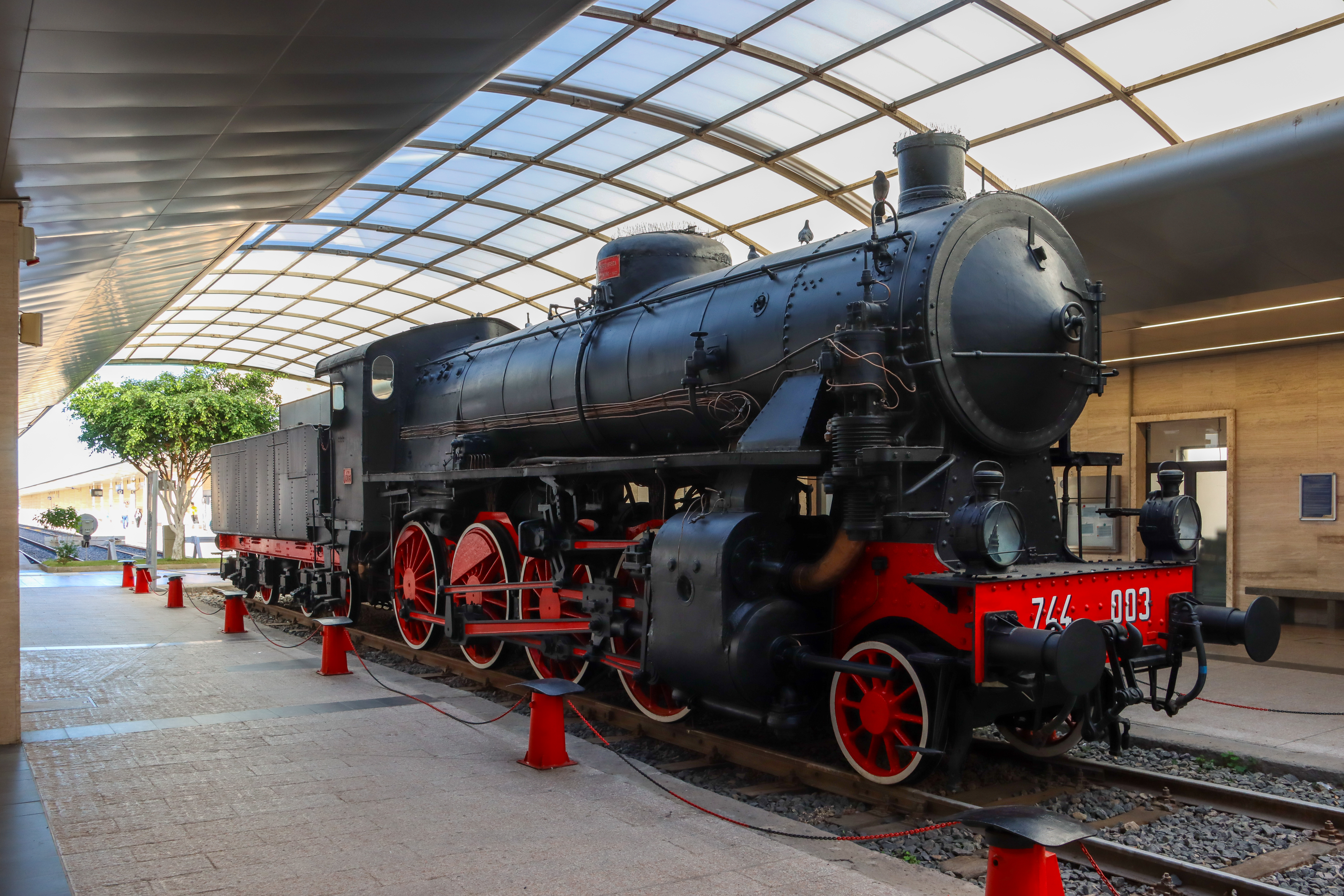
Preserved steam engine FS Class 744 in Cagliari railway station

The station was inaugurated in July 1879, as terminus of the central Sardinian line to Oristano, Ozieri and Olbia. In 1893 it was linked to the port for freight traffic. In the late 1980s, due to the construction of a second track on the Cagliari-Decimomannu line, the station was renovated and a fourth platform (to host a total of 8 passenger tracks) was built.

== Structure and transport ==
Cagliari station is located in the middle of the city and counts a railway depot 200 m in the north and parallel to the line. The station building has three floors and, at the top, a sculpture representing the coat of arms of the city and the inscription "FERROVIE DELLO STATO".

The station, which like the other stations in Sardinia is not electrified, is served by regional trains linking it to almost all the island towns, excluding some as Nuoro or Alghero.

== Other station ==
Cagliari had a separate railway station, for Ferrovie della Sardegna (FdS), at Piazza della Repubblica. However, in 2008, the FdS line from Mandas was cut back to Monserrato, and the track beyond was taken over by trams of the Cagliari light rail system.

== Photogallery ==
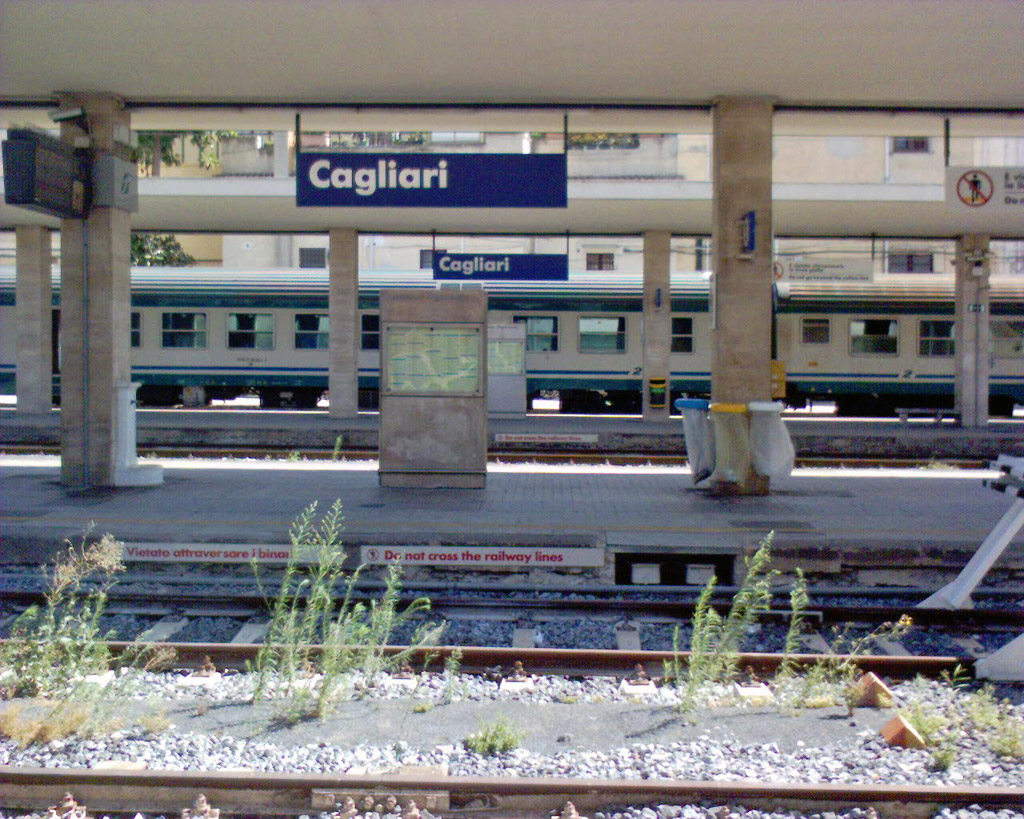
View of the platforms

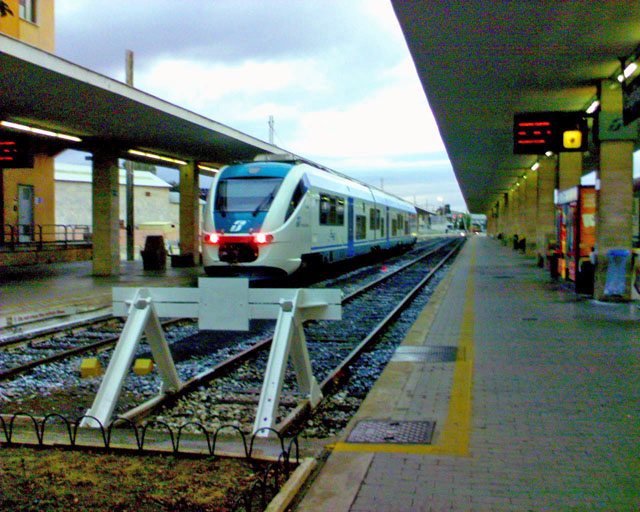
A diesel Minuetto at the station

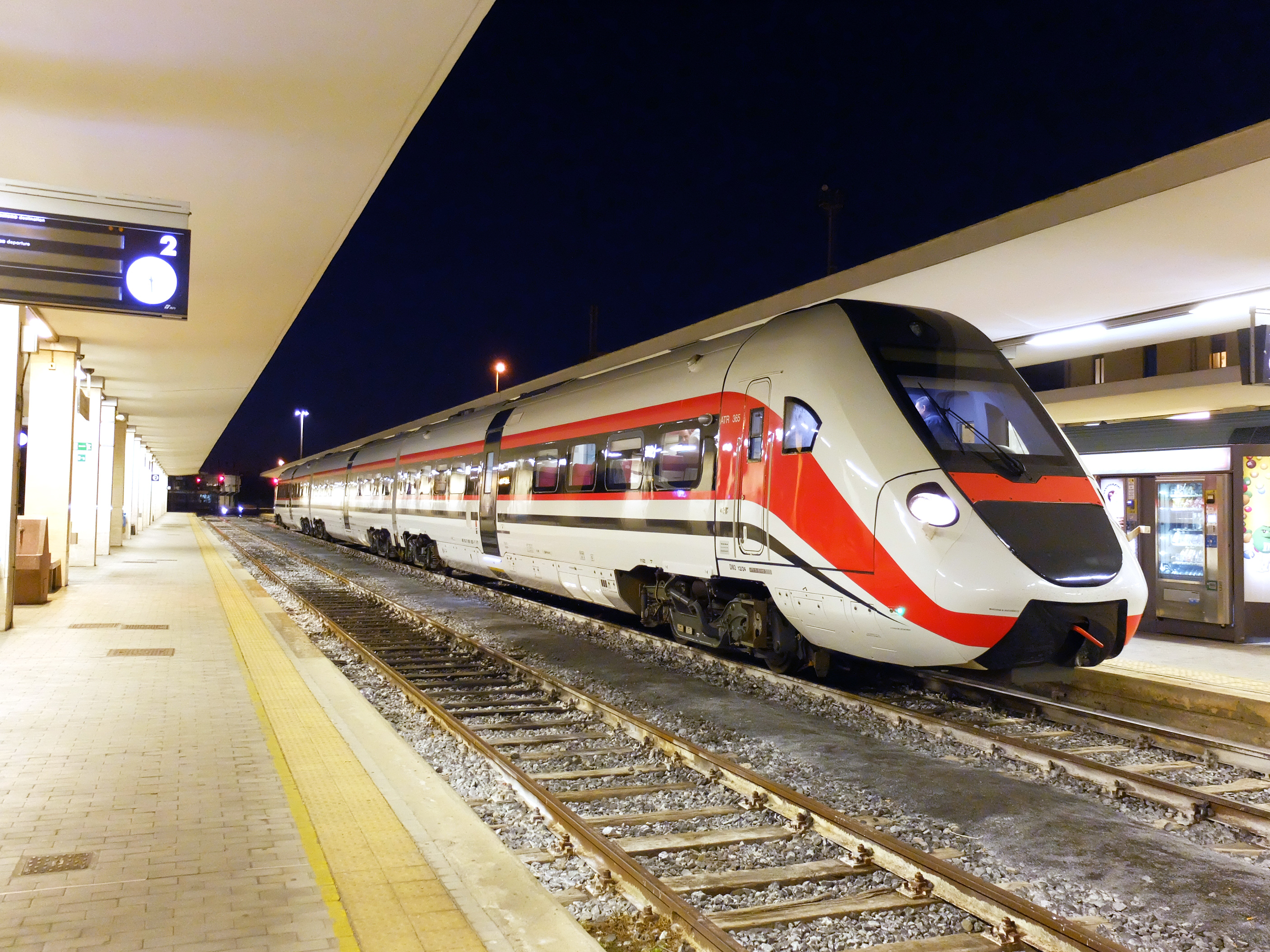
ATR 365

== See also ==
- Trolleybuses in Cagliari
- Sassari railway station
- Railway stations in Italy
- List of railway stations in Sardinia
- Rail transport in Italy
- History of rail transport in Italy
