= Structure of the Italian Air Force =

The article provides an overview of the organization of the Italian Air Force as of November 2026. The Armed Forces of Italy are under the command of the Italian Supreme Defence Council, presided over by the President of the Italian Republic. The Italian Air Force is commanded by the "Chief of the Air Force General Staff" (Capo di Stato Maggiore dell’Aeronautica Militare) in Rome.

== Chief of the Air Force General Staff ==
The Chief of the Air Force General Staff heads the Air Force General Staff in Rome, manages the operational aspects of the air force, and supervises three major commands.

- Air Force General Staff, in Rome
  - Air Fleet Command - 1st Air Region (Comando della Squadra Aerea – 1ª Regione Aerea), in Milan
  - Air Force Schools Command - 3rd Air Region (Comando delle Scuole A.M. – 3ª Regione Aerea), in Bari
  - Logistic Command (Comando Logistico), in Rome

=== Air Force General Staff ===
The following offices report directly to the Chief of the Air Force General Staff.

- Chief of the Air Force General Staff (Capo di Stato Maggiore dell’Aeronautica Militare)
  - General Office of the Chief of the Air Staff (Ufficio Generale del Capo di SMA)
  - Private Secretariat of the Chief of the Air Staff (Segreteria Particolare del Capo di SMA)
  - Directorate for the Management of Air Force Military Personnel (Direzione per l’Impiego del Personale Militare dell’Aeronautica - DIPMA)
  - General Office for the Coordination of Accident Prevention and Environmental Protection (Ufficio Generale di Coordinamento della Prevenzione Antinfortunistica e della Tutela Ambientale - UCOPRATA)
  - General Office for the Coordination of Accident Prevention Oversight (Ufficio Generale di Coordinamento della Vigilanza Antinfortunistica - UCOVA)
  - General Office for Administrative Responsibility – Italian Air Force (Ufficio Generale Centro di Responsabilità Amministrativa – Aeronautica Militare)
    - Air Force Financial Administration Directorate - Bari (Direzione di Intendenza dell'Aeronautica Militare - Bari), at Bari Air Base
    - Air Force Financial Administration Directorate - Guidonia (Direzione di Intendenza dell'Aeronautica Militare - Guidonia), at Guidonia Air Base
    - Air Force Financial Administration Directorate - Milan (Direzione di Intendenza dell'Aeronautica Militare - Milano), in Milan
    - Air Force Financial Administration Directorate - Rome (Direzione di Intendenza dell'Aeronautica Militare - Roma), in Rome
  - General Inspectorate for the Air Force (Ispettorato Generale per l’Aeronautica Militare)
  - Flight Safety Inspectorate (Ispettorato per la Sicurezza del Volo - ISV)
  - Higher Institute for Flight Safety (Istituto Superiore per la Sicurezza del Volo - ISSV)
  - Office of the General of the Arms Branch (Ufficio del Generale del Ruolo delle Armi)
  - Head of the Aeronautical Engineering Corps (Capo del Corpo del Genio Aeronautico)
  - Head of the Aeronautical Commissariat Corps (Capo del Corpo di Commissariato Aeronautico)
  - Head of the Aeronautical Medical Corps (Capo del Corpo Sanitario Aeronautico)
  - Promotion Boards and the Permanent Secretariat (Commissioni di Avanzamento e la Segreteria Permanente)
  - Permanent Secretariat of the Higher Promotion Board (Segreteria Permanente Commissione Superiore Avanzamento)
  - Ordinary Promotion Board for Officers (Commissione Ordinaria Avanzamento Ufficiali)
  - Permanent Promotion Board for Warrant Officers of the Air Force (Commissione Permanente Avanzamento Marescialli dell'A.M.)
  - Permanent Promotion Board for Sergeants of the Air Force (Commissione Permanente Avanzamento Sergenti dell'A.M.)
  - Permanent Promotion Board for Permanent-Service Enlisted Personnel of the Air Force (Commissione Permanente Avanzamento Volontari in S.P. dell'A.M.)
  - Flight Aide-de-Camp to the Chief of the Air Force General Staff (Aiutante di Volo del Capo di SMA)
  - Legal Advisor to the Chief of the Air Force General Staff (Consulente Giuridico del Capo di SMA)
  - Military Technical Consultant – Promotion Issues (Consulente Tecnico Militare Problematiche di Avanzamento)
  - Air Force Non-Commissioned Officers, Junior Non-Commissioned Officers, and Enlisted Personnel Chief President (Presidente Capo dei Sottufficiali, Graduati e militari di Truppa per l’AM)
  - Air Force Episcopal Vicar Office (Ufficio Vicario Episcopale per l’AM)
  - Air Force Carabinieri Command (Comando Carabinieri per l’AM)
  - Global Combat Air Programme (GCAP) International Government Organisation

==== Deputy Chief of Staff of the Air Force ====
The Deputy Chief of Staff of the Air Force (Sottocapo di Stato Maggiore Aeronautica Militare - SCaSMA) manages the bureaucratic aspects of the Air Force.

- Deputy Chief of Staff of the Air Force (Sottocapo di Stato Maggiore Aeronautica Militare - SCaSMA)
  - Office of the Deputy Chief of Staff of the Air Force (Ufficio del Sottocapo di SMA)
  - Private Secretariat of the Deputy Chief of Staff of the Air Force (Segreteria Particolare del SCaSMA)
  - Staff Officer to the Deputy Chief of Staff of the Air Force (Ufficiale Addetto del SCaSMA)
  - 1st Department "Organization and Personnel" (1° Reparto "Ordinamento e Personale" - SMA-ORD)
  - 3rd Department "Aerospace Capability Planning" (3° Reparto "Pianificazione dello Strumento Aerospaziale" - SMA-PIANI)
  - 4th Department "Logistics" (4° Reparto "Logistica" - SMA-LOG)
  - 5th Department "Communications and General Affairs" (5° Reparto "Comunicazione e Affari Generali")
  - 6th Department "Economic and Financial Affairs" (6° Reparto "Affari Economici e Finanziari" - SMA-FIN))
  - Central Security Department (Organo Centrale di Sicurezza)
    - Carabinieri Security Group (Gruppo Carabinieri Sicurezza)
    - Security Coordination Center (Centro Coordinamento Sicurezza), at Ciampino Air Base
      - Air Force Operational Security Group (Gruppo Operativo Sicurezza AM)
      - Defence Industries Agency Analysis and Evaluation Group (Gruppo Analisi e Valutazioni AID)
      - Special Access Program Security Office - Amendola (Ufficio Sicurezza Special Access Programme - Amendola), at Amendola Air Base
      - Special Access Program Security Office - Cameri (Ufficio Sicurezza Special Access Programme - Cameri), at Cameri Air Base
      - Special Access Program Security Office - Ghedi (Ufficio Sicurezza Special Access Programme - Ghedi), at Ghedi Air Base
      - Special Access Program Security Office - Pratica di Mare (Ufficio Sicurezza Special Access Programme - Pratica di Mare), at Pratica di Mare Air Base
  - CIS Cyber Department (Reparto CIS Cyber)
  - Air and Space Assets Development, Planning, and Transformation Department (Reparto Sviluppo, Pianificazione e Trasformazione dello Strumento Aereo e Spaziale)
  - General Office for Space (Ufficio Generale per lo Spazio - SMA-SPAZIO)
  - General Office for Military Air Traffic (Ufficio Generale per la Circolazione Aerea Militare - SMAUCAM)
  - General Office for Legal Affairs and Counsel of the Italian Air Force (Ufficio Generale Consulenza e Affari Giuridici dell'Aeronautica Militare - SMAUCAG)
  - General Office for Management Innovation (Ufficio Generale per l'Innovazione Manageriale - SMA-UIM)

==== Air Force Command Rome ====
The Air Force Command Rome (Comando Aeronautica Militare Roma - COMAER), at Centocelle Airport has territorial and liaison functions for the city of Rome and provides administrative support to the air force headquarter and units based at Centocelle Airport and Vigna di Valle Air Base.

- Air Force Command Rome (Comando Aeronautica Militare Roma - COMAER), at Centocelle Airport
  - Centocelle Airport Command / COMAER Headquarters (Comando Aeroporto Centocelle / Quartier Generale del COMAER), at Centocelle Airport
  - Higher Commands Support Command (Comando Supporti Enti di Vertice - COMSEV), at Centocelle Airport
    - Terminillo Air Force Detachment (Distaccamento Aeronautico Terminillo), in Monte Terminillo
  - Vigna di Valle Airport Command / Historiographical and Sports Center (Comando Aeroporto Vigna di Valle/ Centro Storiografico e Sportivo), at Vigna di Valle Air Base
    - Historical Museum (Museo Storico)
    - Sports Center (Centro Sportivo)
    - General Services Group (Gruppo Servizi Generali)
    - Force Protection Platoon (Plotone Protezione delle Forze)

==== Inspector of Aviation for the Navy ====
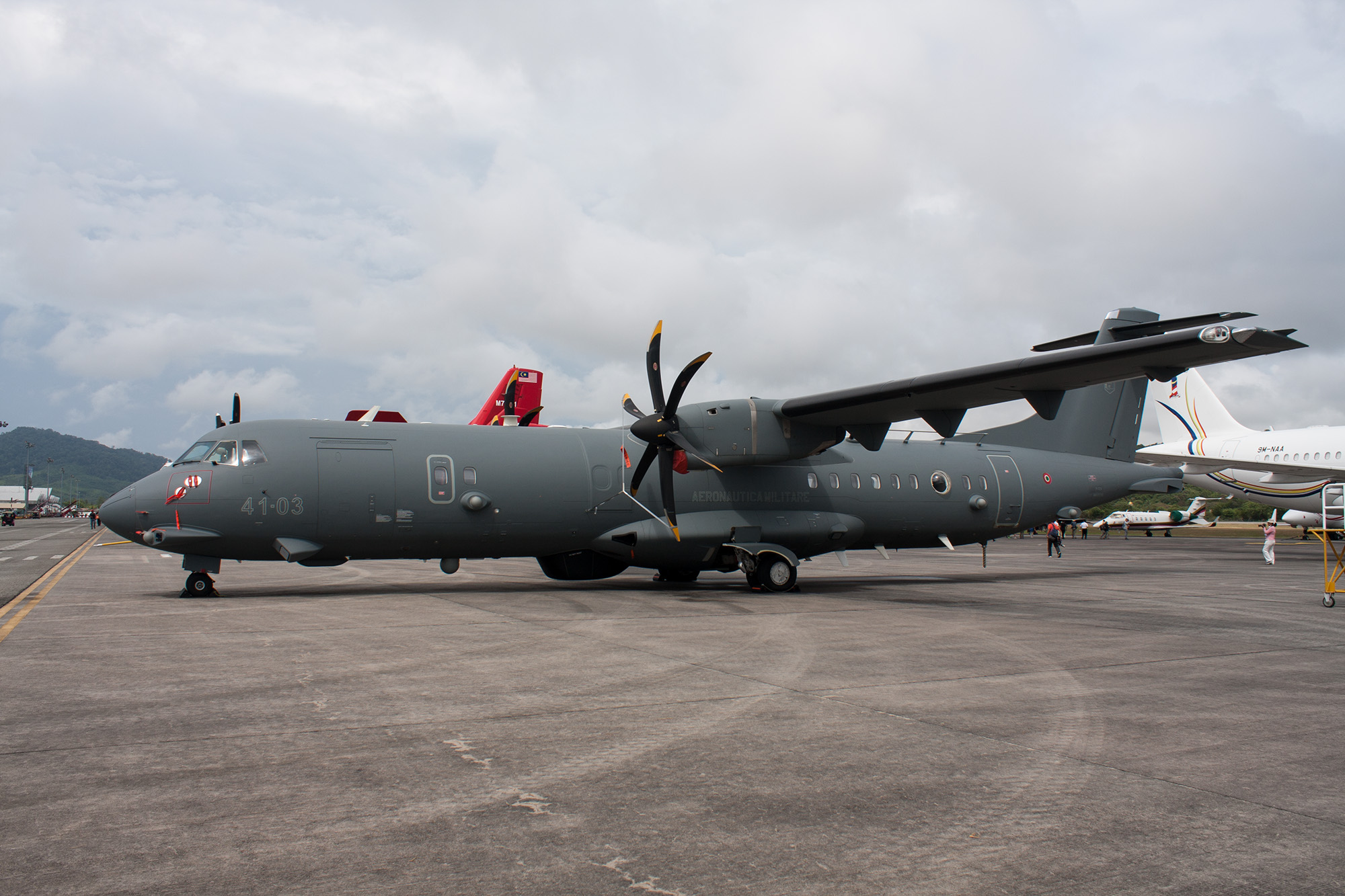
P-72A ASW 41-03 of the 41st Anti-Submarine Wing

The Inspector of Aviation for the Navy (Ispettore dell’Aviazione per la Marina - ISPAVIAMAR) reports to the Chief of the Air Force General Staff and the Chief of the Navy General Staff. ISPAVIAMAR oversees the technical and logistic aeronautical aspects, and the training of the Italian military's airborne anti-submarine forces. The inspector is a brigadier general of the air force, whose office and staff reside in the navy's headquarter in Rome. The only unit assigned to ISPAVIAMAR is the 41° Stormo AntiSom Athos Ammannato, which is under operational control of the Italian Navy.

- Inspector of Aviation for the Navy (Ispettore dell’Aviazione per la Marina - ISPAVIAMAR)
  - 41st Anti-Submarine Wing "Athos Ammannato" (41° Stormo AntiSom "Athos Ammannato"), at Sigonella Air Base
    - 86th Crew Training Center Group (86° Gruppo Centro Addestramento Equipaggi)
    - 88th Anti-Submarine Group (88° Gruppo AntiSom), with 4 × P-72A ASW
    - Aircraft Efficiency Group (Gruppo Efficienza Aeromobili)
    - Force Protection Group (Gruppo Protezione delle Forze)
    - Logistics Unit (Reparto Logistica)

=== Air Fleet Command - 1st Air Region ===
Main bases of the Italian Air Force as of November 2026:
Eurofighter Typhoon Tornado/F-35A Lightning II F-35A/B Lightning II
P-72A ASW SF.260EA T-346PAN MB-339CDII, T-345A, T-346A
Helicopters Remotely Piloted Aircraft other bases

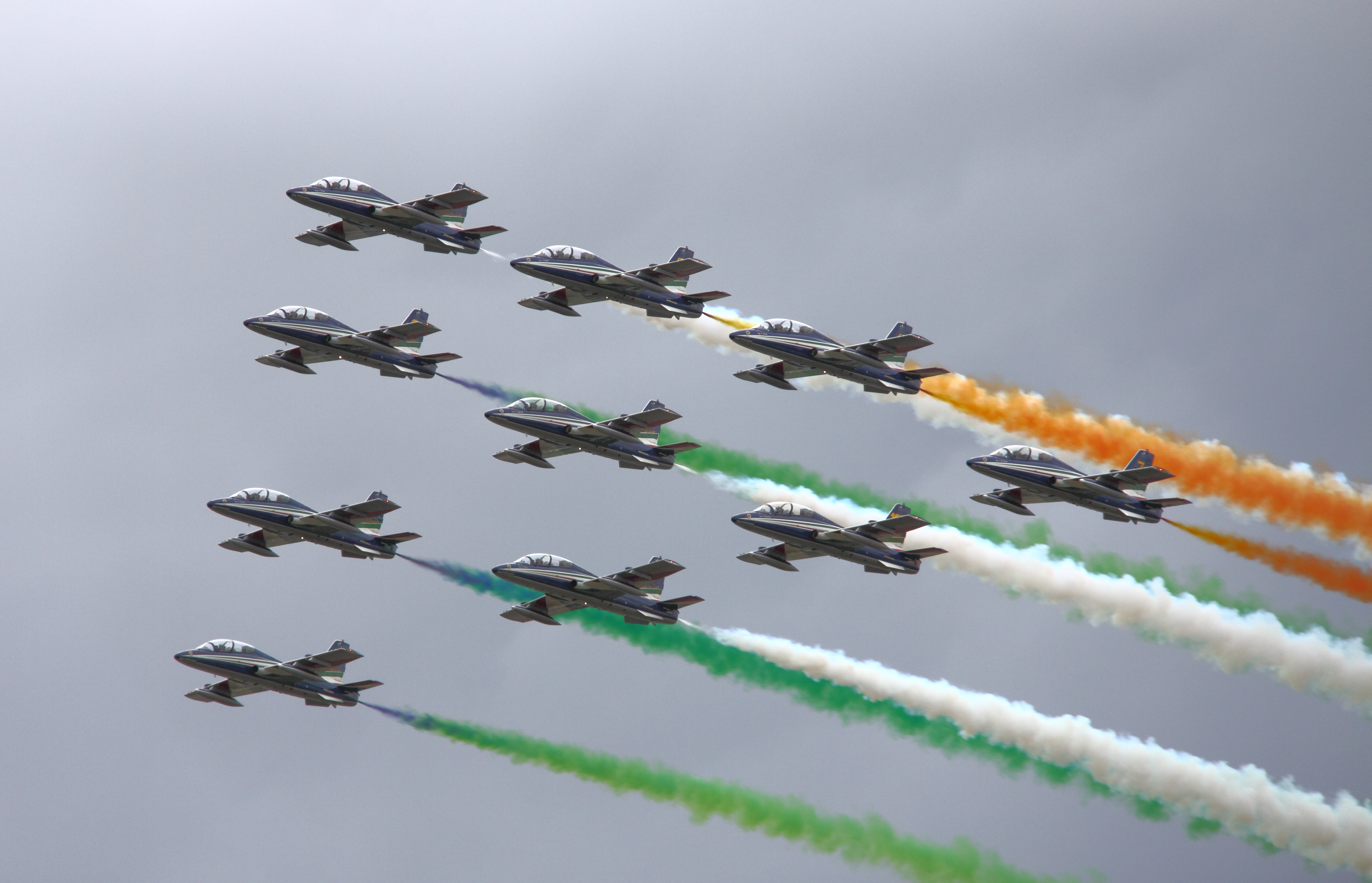
313th Acrobatic Training Group over Gloucestershire during Royal International Air Tattoo 2011

The Air Fleet Command - 1st Air Region (Comando della Squadra Aerea – 1ª Regione Aerea) is headquartered in Milan and serves as the top-level command for the air force’s operational organizations. The command is led by an Air Squadron General (Lieutenant General equivalent), who reports directly to the Chief of Staff of the Italian Air Force. The command is responsible for the preparation and operational employment of the aerospace assets. Following its merger with the 1st Air Region, it also carries out territorial functions and serves as a liaison with local authorities and regional administrations.

- Air Fleet Command - 1st Air Region (Comando della Squadra Aerea – 1ª Regione Aerea), in Milan
  - Airport Command - Headquarters of the Air Fleet Command - 1st Air Region (Comando Aeroporto - Quartier Generale del Comando Squadra Aerea - 1ª Regione Aerea), at Linate Air Base
  - Aerospace Operations Command (Comando Operazioni Aerospaziali), in Poggio Renatico
  - Combat Forces Command (Comando Forze di Combattimento), in Milan
  - Mobility and Support Forces Command (Comando Forze per la Mobilità e il Supporto), at Centocelle Airport
  - 1st Special Operations Air Brigade (1ª Brigata Aerea Operazioni Speciali), in Furbara Air Base
  - 9th ISTAR-EW Air Brigade (9ª Brigata Aerea ISTAR-EW), at Pratica di Mare Air Base
  - Italian Air Force Delegation - Albacete (Rappresentanza Aeronautica Militare - Albacete), at NATO's Tactical Leadership Programme, at Albacete Air Base, Spain
  - Italian Air Force Delegation - Eindhoven (Rappresentanza Aeronautica Militare - Eindhoven), at the European Air Transport Command, at Eindhoven Air Base, The Netherlands

==== Aerospace Operations Command ====
The Aerospace Operations Command (Comando Operazioni Aerospaziali) ensures the effective employment of the Italian Air Force's aerospace power. The command is the Italian Air Force’s single point of contact for Air Defence, Missile Defence, Air Traffic Coordination and Control, Search and Rescue, and Military Air Transport. The command also functions as the operational staff for the Chief of Staff of the Italian Air Force in his capacity as Commander of Air Forces. The command, through its Space Situational Awareness Center (C-SSA), contributes to the generation and distribution of the national Space Situational Awareness (SSA) and Space Surveillance and Tracking (SST) services. Furthermore the command is tasked with preparing and training personnel to operate within Command and Control (C2) structures—whether in national, multinational, or coalition contexts, or within NATO and European Union organizations. It is also the Italian Air Force’s doctrinal reference point for the employment and development of aerospace power.

- Aerospace Operations Command (Comando Operazioni Aerospaziali), in Poggio Renatico
  - Air and Space Warfare Center (ASWC), at Pratica di Mare Air Base
  - General Services Support Unit (Reparto Supporto Servizi Generali - RSSG), in Poggio Renatico
    - Operational Technical Services Group (Gruppo Servizi Tecnici Operativi)
    - Operational Logistics Services Group (Gruppo Servizi Logistici Operativi)
    - Force Protection Group (Gruppo Protezione delle Forze)
  - Aerospace Control Brigade (Brigata Controllo Aerospazio - BCA), in Poggio Renatico
    - Italian Air Force Delegation - Geilenkirchen (Rappresentanza Aeronautica Militare - Geilenkirchen), at NATO's Airborne Early Warning & Control Force, at NATO Air Base Geilenkirchen, Germany
    - Integrated Air and Missile Defence Unit (Reparto Difesa Aerea e Missilistica Integrata - ReDAMI), in Poggio Renatico
      - 11th Integrated Air and Missile Defence Group (11° Gruppo DAMI - 11° GrDAMI), in Poggio Renatico (Air Operations Center - ITA-AOC; reports to NATO's Integrated Air Defence System CAOC Torrejón, at Torrejón Air Base, Spain
      - 22nd Integrated Air and Missile Defence Group (22° Gruppo DAMI - 22° GrDAMI), in Licola
        - Integrated Air and Missile Defence Service (Servizio DAMI)
        - Telecommunication Service (Servizio TLC)
        - Logistic Service (Servizio Logistica)
        - Force Protection Company (Compagnia Protezione delle Forze)
    - Air Force Coordination and Control Services Unit (Reparto Servizi Coordinamento e Controllo AM - RSCCAM), at Ciampino Air Base (Air traffic management)
      - Air Force Coordination and Control Service Roma (Servizo Coordinamento e Controllo AM Roma), in Rome
      - Air Force Coordination and Control Service Abano Terme (Servizo Coordinamento e Controllo AM Abano Terme), in Abano Terme
      - Air Force Coordination and Control Service Linate (Servizo Coordinamento e Controllo AM Linate), at Linate Air Base
    - Mobile Command and Control Unit (Reparto Mobile di Comando e Controllo - RMCC), at Bari Air Base (Air-transportable Air Operations Center)
      - Telecommunication and Command & Control Systems Group (Gruppo Sistemi TLC e C2)
      - Support Services Group (Gruppo Servizi di Supporto)
    - Airspace Control Training Unit (Reparto Addestramento Controllo Spazio Aereo - RACSA), at Pratica di Mare Air Base
      - Air Traffic Operational Training Group (Gruppo Addestramento Operativo Traffico Aereo)
      - Air Defence Operational Training Group (Gruppo Addestramento Operativo Difesa Aerea)
      - Technical Support Group (Gruppo Supporto Tecnico)

==== Combat Forces Command ====
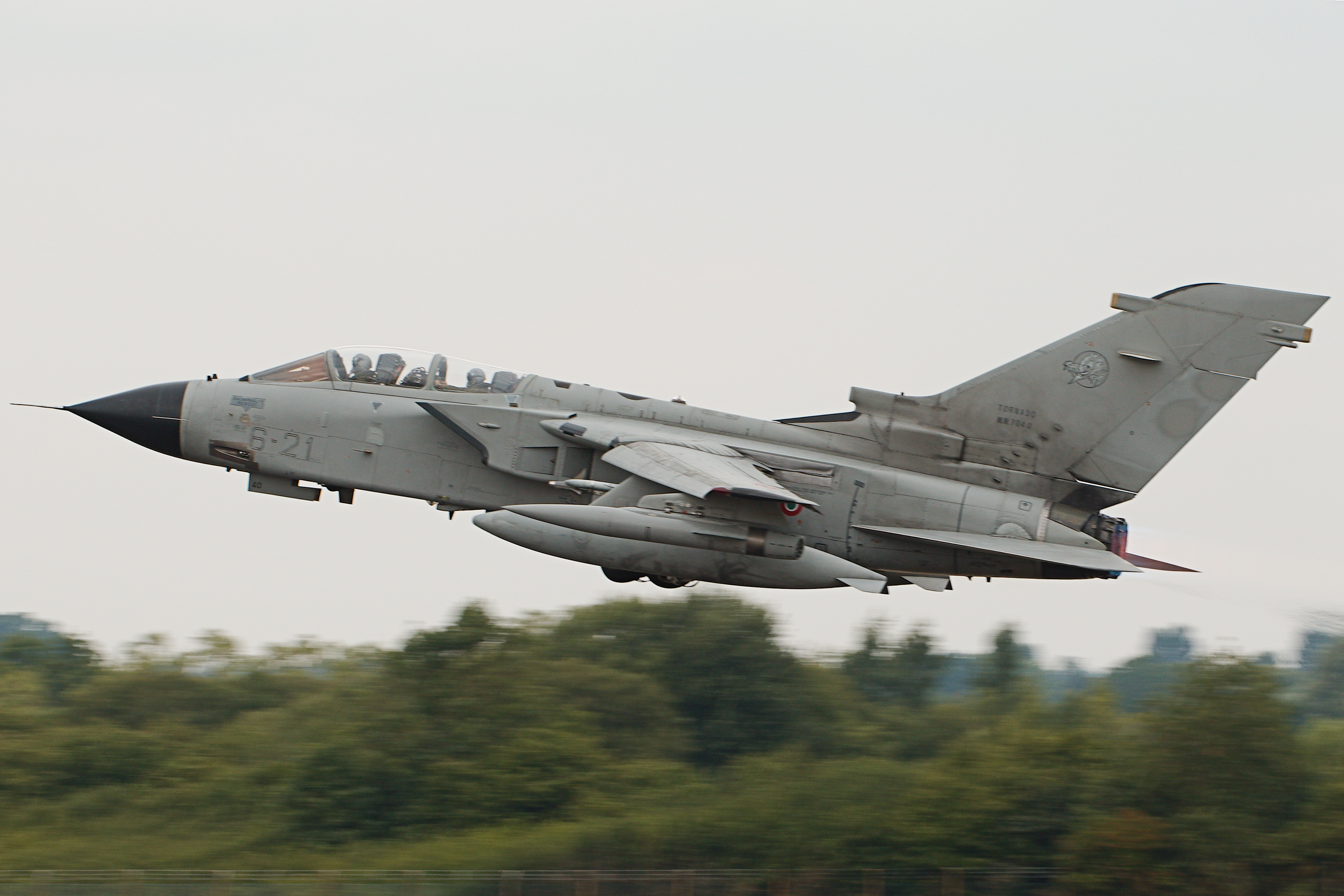
Tornado IDS 6-21 of the 6th Wing

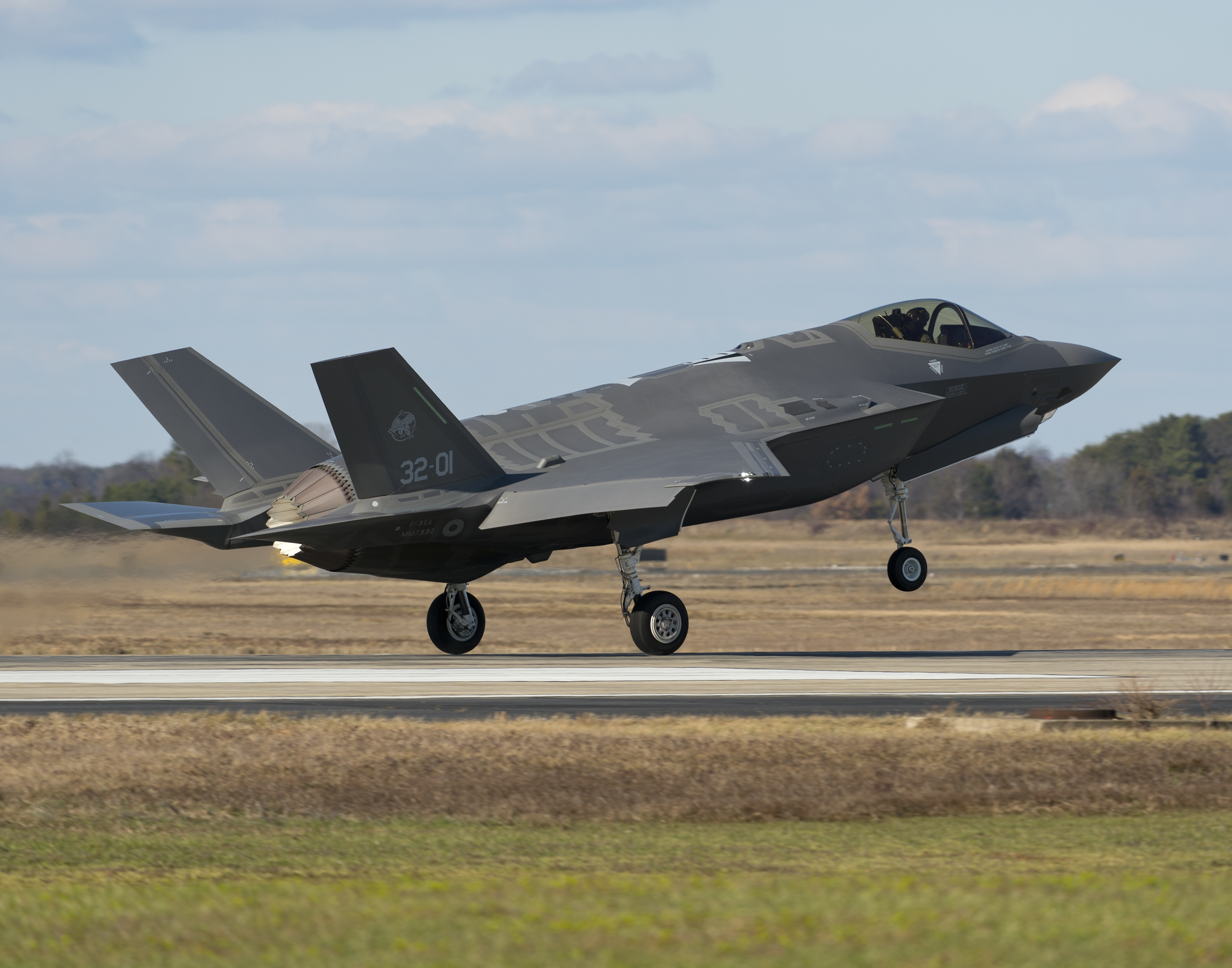
F-35A Lightning II 32-01 of the 32nd Wing

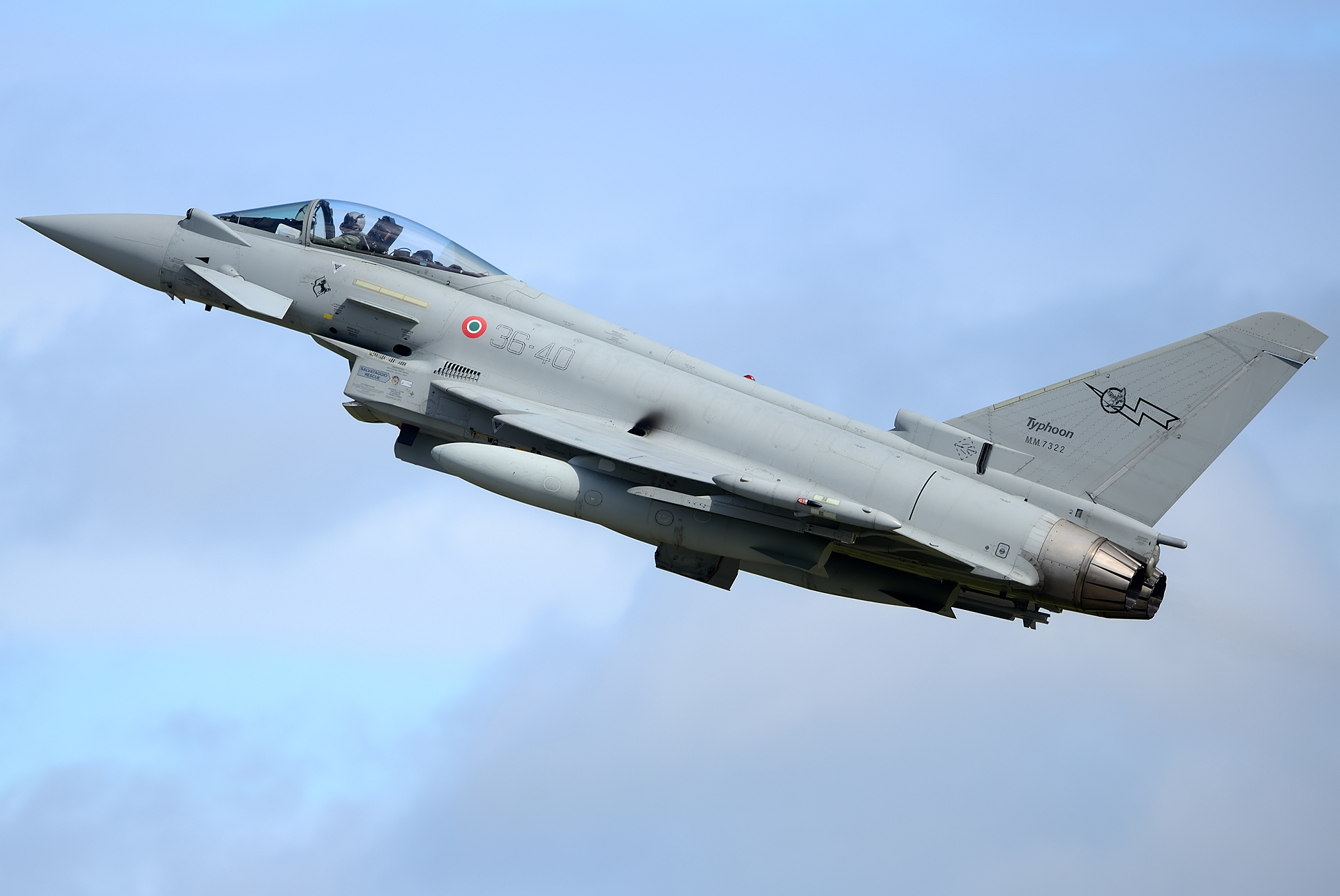
Eurofighter Typhoon 36-40 of the 36th Wing

The Combat Forces Command (Comando Forze di Combattimento) is tasked with achieving and maintaining the operational readiness of all Italian Air Force combat assets, ensuring the operational efficiency of the assigned weapon systems, equipment, and materiel, overseeing the training of its personnel, and continuously updating and optimizing the operational procedures.

- Combat Forces Command (Comando Forze di Combattimento), in Milan
  - Italian Air Force Delegation - Luke AFB (Rappresentanza Aeronautica Militare - Luke AFB), at the F-35 Pilot Training Center, at Luke Air Force Base, USA
    - 156th Flight Group (156° Gruppo Volo), with F-35A Lightning II (Operational Conversion Unit)
  - 313th Acrobatic Training Group (313° Gruppo Addestramento Acrobatico), at Rivolto Air Base, with T-346 PAN
  - Connections Squadron Linate (Squadriglia Collegamenti Linate), at Linate Air Base, with NH-500E helicopters and S.208M planes
  - Piacenza Airport Detachment (Distaccamento Aeroportuale Piacenza), at Piacenza Airport
  - Aviano Air Base Command (Comando Aeroporto Aviano), at Aviano Air Base
    - Operational Technical Services Group (Gruppo Servizi Tecnici Operativi)
    - Force Protection Group (Gruppo Protezione delle Forze)
  - 2nd Wing "Mario D'Agostini" (2° Stormo "Mario D'Agostini"), at Rivolto Air Base
    - Missile Group (Gruppo Missili), with MAADS air defence systems
    - 80th OCU Group (80° Gruppo OCU) (Operational Conversion Unit), with MAADS air defence systems
    - Force Protection Company (Compagnia Protezione delle Forze)
    - Logistics Unit (Reparto Logistica)
  - 4th Wing "Amedeo d'Aosta" (4° Stormo "Amedeo d'Aosta"), at Grosseto Air Base
    - IX Flight Group (IX Gruppo Volo), with Eurofighter Typhoon (for traditional reason the group's number is written in roman numerals)
    - 20th Flight Group (20° Gruppo Volo), with Eurofighter Typhoon (Operational Conversion Unit with twin-seat Eurofighter Typhoons)
    - Aircraft Efficiency Group (Gruppo Efficienza Aeromobili)
    - Force Protection Group (Gruppo Protezione delle Forze)
    - Logistics Unit (Reparto Logistica)
  - 6th Wing "Alfredo Fusco" (6° Stormo "Alfredo Fusco"), at Ghedi Air Base
    - 102nd Flight Group (102° Gruppo Volo), with F-35A Lightning II
    - 154th Flight Group (154° Gruppo Volo), with Tornado IDS (being replaced by F-35A Lightning II)
    - 155th Flight Group (155° Gruppo Volo), with Tornado ECR (Suppression of Enemy Air Defences)
    - Aircraft Efficiency Group (Gruppo Efficienza Aeromobili)
    - Force Protection Group (Gruppo Protezione delle Forze)
    - Logistics Unit (Reparto Logistica)
  - 32nd Wing "Armando Boetto" (32° Stormo "Armando Boetto"), at Amendola Air Base
    - 13th Flight Group (13° Gruppo Volo), with F-35A Lightning II
    - 28th Flight Group (28° Gruppo Volo), with MQ-9A Predator B (being replaced by Astore Levante)
    - 61st Flight Group (61° Gruppo Volo), with MQ-9A Predator B (being replaced by Astore Levante), detached to Sigonella Air Base
    - 101st Flight Group (101° Gruppo Volo), with F-35B Lightning II
    - Aircraft Efficiency Group (Gruppo Efficienza Aeromobili)
    - Force Protection Group (Gruppo Protezione delle Forze)
    - Logistics Unit (Reparto Logistica)
  - 36th Wing "Riccardo Hellmuth Seidl" (36° Stormo "Riccardo Hellmuth Seidl"), at Gioia del Colle Air Base
    - 10th Flight Group (10° Gruppo Volo), with Eurofighter Typhoon
    - 12th Flight Group (12° Gruppo Volo), with Eurofighter Typhoon
    - Aircraft Efficiency Group (Gruppo Efficienza Aeromobili)
    - Force Protection Group (Gruppo Protezione delle Forze)
    - Logistics Unit (Reparto Logistica)
  - 37th Wing "Cesare Toschi" (37° Stormo "Cesare Toschi"), at Trapani Air Base
    - 18th Flight Group (18° Gruppo Volo), with Eurofighter Typhoon
    - Aircraft Efficiency Group (Gruppo Efficienza Aeromobili)
    - Force Protection Group (Gruppo Protezione delle Forze)
    - Logistics Unit (Reparto Logistica)
    - Pantelleria Airport Detachment (Distaccamento Aeroportuale Pantelleria), at Pantelleria Airport
  - 51st Wing "Ferruccio Serafini" (51° Stormo "Ferruccio Serafini"), at Istrana Air Base
    - 132nd Flight Group (132° Gruppo Volo), with Eurofighter Typhoon
    - Aircraft Efficiency Group (Gruppo Efficienza Aeromobili)
    - Force Protection Group (Gruppo Protezione delle Forze)
    - Logistics Unit (Reparto Logistica)

==== Mobility and Support Forces Command ====
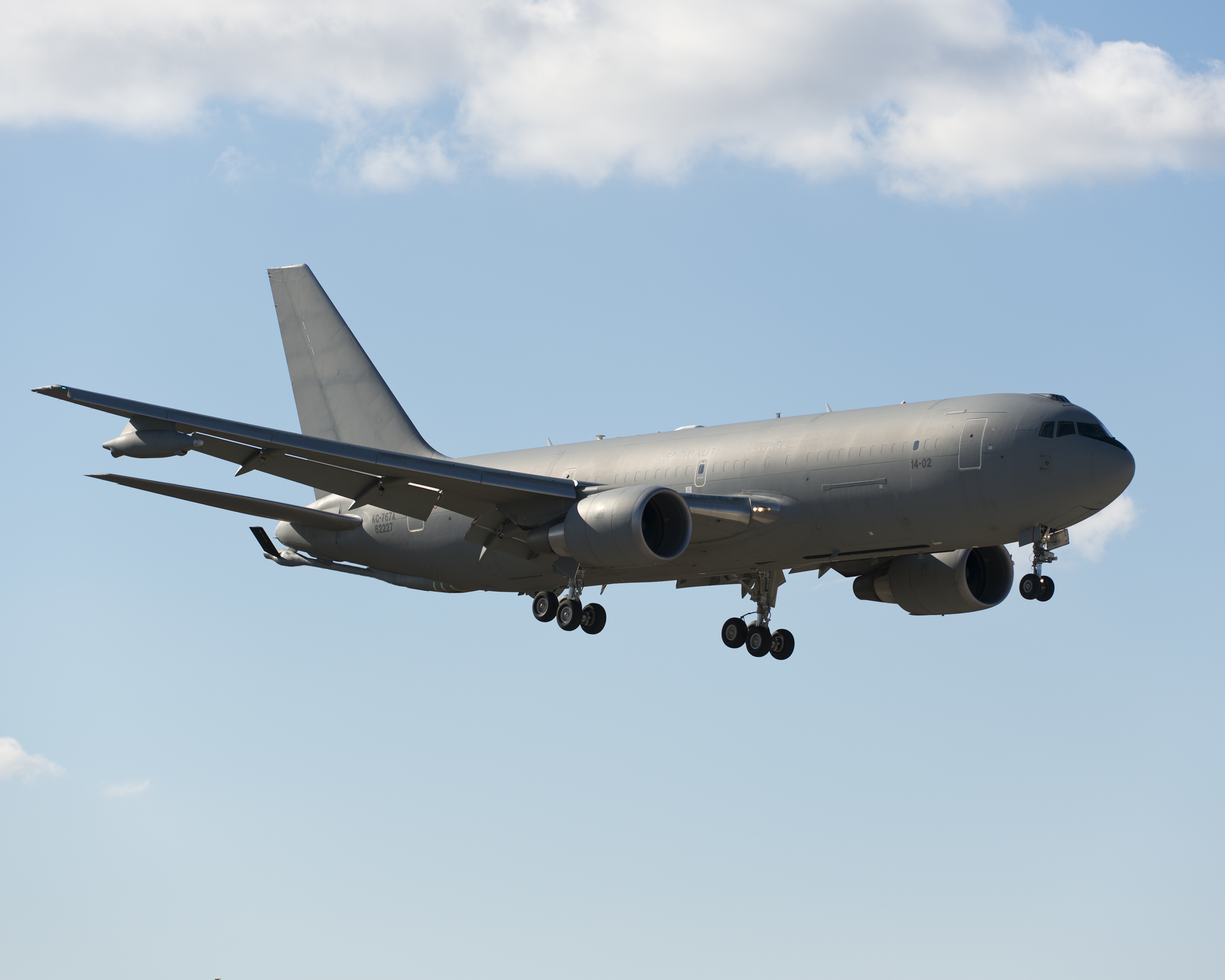
KC-767 14-02 of the 14th Wing

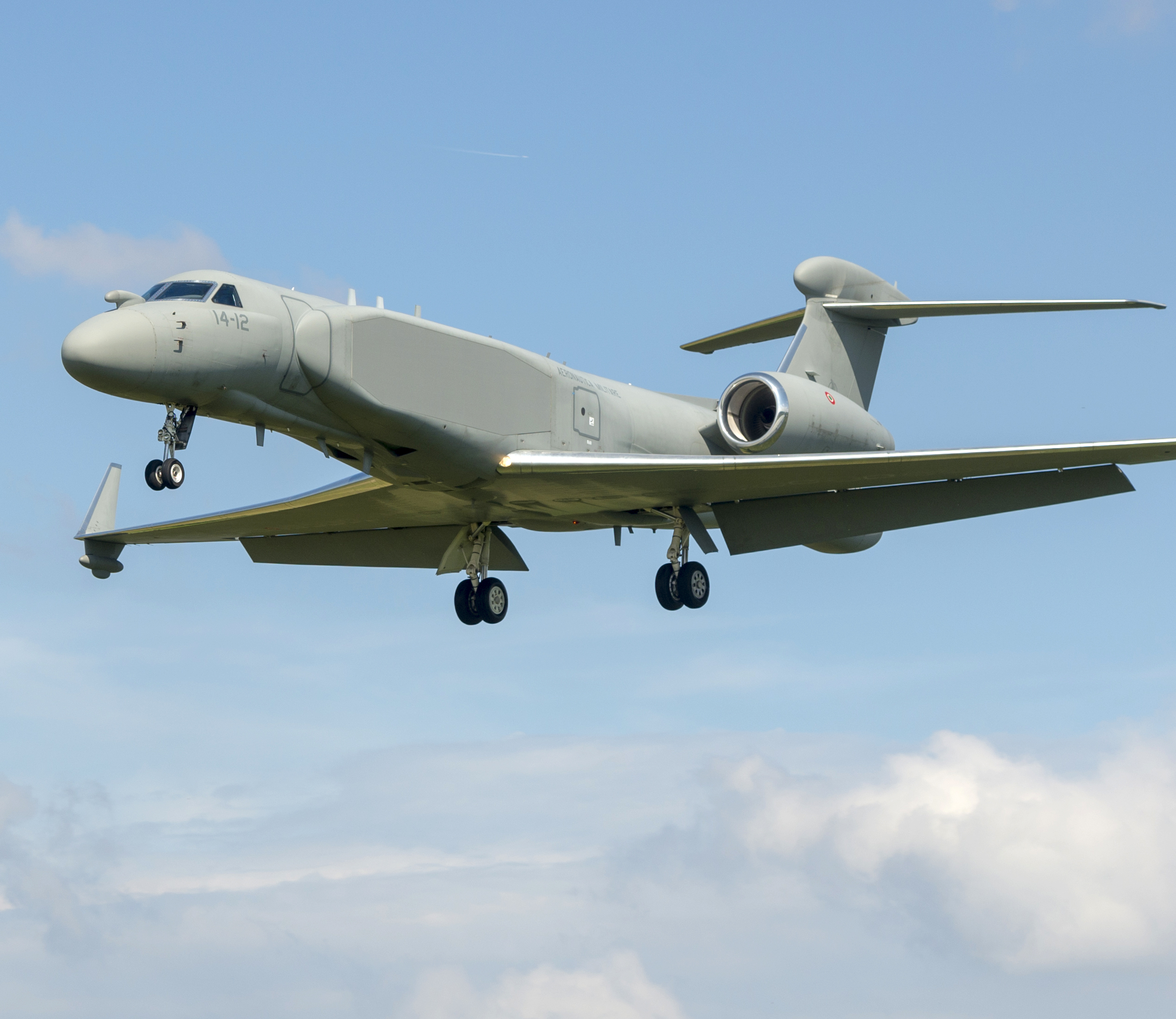
G550CAEW 14-12 of the 14th Wing

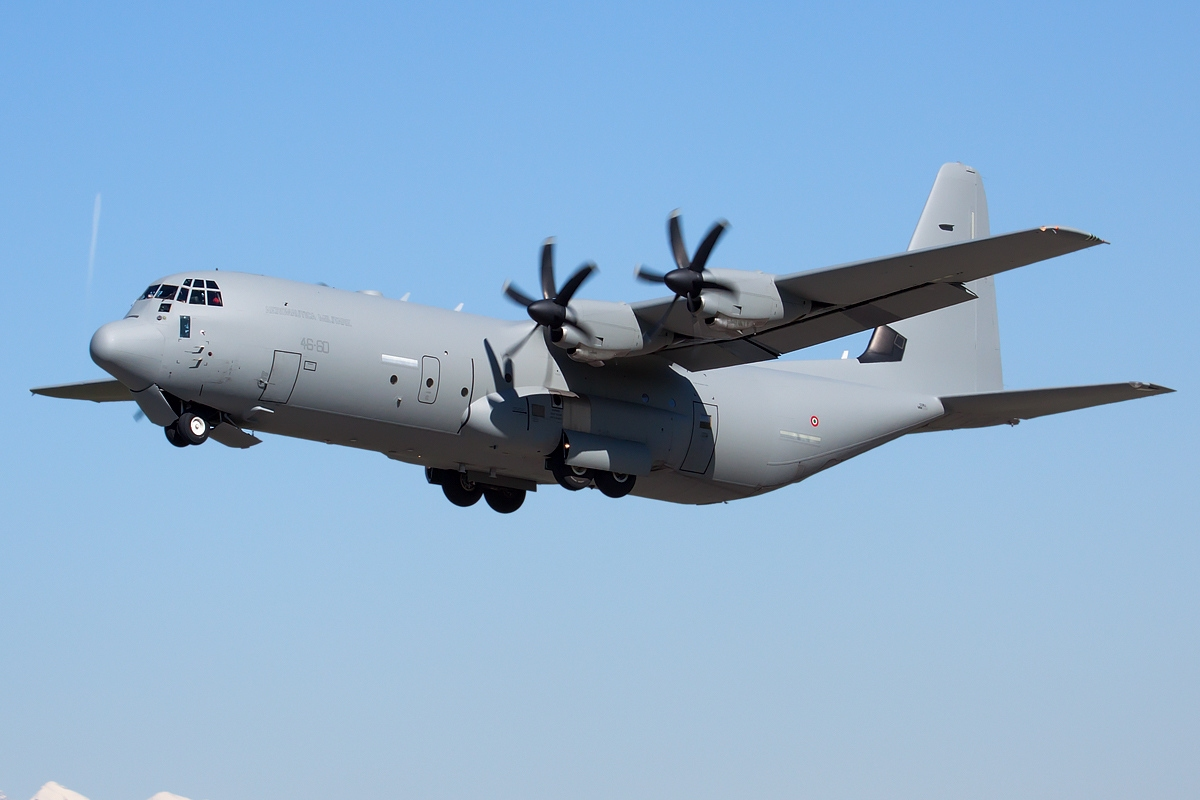
C-130J-30 Super Hercules 46-60 of the 46th Air Brigade

The Mobility and Support Forces Command (Comando Forze per la Mobilità e il Supporto) is tasked with acquiring and then maintaining the operational readiness of all assets dedicated to the support of the Italian Air Force's combat forces, and the constant updating and optimization of the operational procedures. The command ensures the preparation of personnel, the readiness of the assigned weapon systems. The command's operational capabilities include, among others, Airlift Transportation, Air-to-Air Refueling, Force Protection, and Search And Rescue (SAR).

- Mobility and Support Forces Command (Comando Forze per la Mobilità e il Supporto), at Centocelle Airport
  - Naples Capodichino Airport Command (Comando Aeroporto Napoli Capodichino), at Capodichino Air Basesupports Naval Support Activity Naples, which in turn supports the United States Sixth Fleet
    - Operational Technical Services Group (Gruppo Servizi Tecnici Operativi)
    - Operational Logistics Services Group (Gruppo Servizi Logistici Operativi)
    - Force Protection Company (Compagnia Protezione delle Forze)
  - 14th Wing "Sergio Sartof" (14° Stormo "Sergio Sartof"), at Pratica di Mare Air Base
    - 8th Flight Group (8° Gruppo Volo), with KC-767 aerial refueling aircraft (being replaced by A330 MRTT aerial refueling aircraft)
    - 71st Flight Group (71° Gruppo Volo), with G550 CAEW (Airborne Early Warning), P.180 EVO+ (Radio & Radar Calibration), EA-37B Compass Call (Electronic Warfare), Super King Air 350ER Spydr (Signals Intelligence and Intelligence, Surveillance, Reconnaissance)
    - Aircraft Efficiency Group (Gruppo Efficienza Aeromobili)
    - Crew Training Center (Centro Addestramento Equipaggi)
  - 15th Wing "Stefano Cagna" (15° Stormo "Stefano Cagna"), at Cervia Air Base (Combat Search and Rescue (CSAR) Wing)
    - 80th CSAR Center (80° Centro CSAR), at Decimomannu Air Base
      - 670th Squadron, with AW-139A helicopters
      - 672nd Squadron, with AW-139A helicopters
    - 81st Crew Training Center (81° Centro Addestramento Equipaggi), at Cervia Air Base, with AW-139A
    - 82nd CSAR Center (82° Centro CSAR), at Trapani Air Base
      - 139th Squadron, with AW-139A helicopters
      - 149th Squadron, with AW-139A helicopters
    - 83rd CSAR Group (83° Gruppo CSAR), at Cervia Air Base
      - 141st Squadron, with AW-139A helicopters
      - 147th Squadron, with AW-139A helicopters
    - 84th CSAR Center (84° Centro CSAR), at Gioia del Colle Air Base
      - 140th Squadron, with AW-139A helicopters
      - 287th Squadron, with AW-139A helicopters
    - 85th CSAR Center (85° Centro CSAR), at Pratica di Mare Air Base
      - 142nd Squadron, with AW-139A helicopters
      - 288th Squadron, with AW-139A helicopters
    - Aircraft Efficiency Group (Gruppo Efficienza Aeromobili)
    - Force Protection Group (Gruppo Protezione delle Forze)
    - Logistics Unit (Reparto Logistica)
  - 16th Wing (16° Stormo ), at Martina Franca Air Base (Force Protection Wing)
    - Air-Fusiliers Group (Gruppo Fucilieri dell'Aria)
    - STO/FP Training Group (Gruppo Addestramento STO/FP) (Survive to Operate/ Force Protection training)
    - Air Force Canine Center (Centro Cinofili dell’Aeronautica Militare), at Grosseto Air Base
    - Operational Technical Group (Gruppo Tecnico Operativo)
    - Operational Logistic Support Group (Gruppo Supporto Logistico Operativo)
  - 31st Wing "Carmelo Raiti" (31° Stormo "Carmelo Raiti"), at Ciampino Air Base
    - 93rd Flight Group (93° Gruppo Volo), with A319CJ, G650ER
    - 306th Flight Group (306° Gruppo Volo), with VH-139A helicopters, and Falcon 900EX, Falcon 900EASy
    - Crew Training Center (Centro Addestramento Equipaggi)
    - Aircraft Efficiency Group (Gruppo Efficienza Aeromobili)
    - Force Protection Group (Gruppo Protezione delle Forze)
    - Logistics Unit (Reparto Logistica)
  - 46th Air Brigade "Silvio Angelucci" (46ª Brigata Aerea "Silvio Angelucci"), at Pisa Air Base
    - 2nd Flight Group (2° Gruppo Volo), with KC-130J Super Hercules
    - 50th Flight Group (50° Gruppo Volo), with C-130J-30 Super Hercules
    - 98th Flight Group (98° Gruppo Volo), with C-27J Spartan, EC-27J Jedi
    - Crew Training Center (Centro Addestramento Equipaggi)
    - Aircraft Efficiency Group (Gruppo Efficienza Aeromobili)
    - Force Protection Group (Gruppo Protezione delle Forze)
    - Logistics Unit (Reparto Logistica)
    - Sarzana-Luni Airport Detachment (Distaccamento Aeroportuale Sarzana-Luni), at Sarzana-Luni Airport

==== 1st Air Region ====
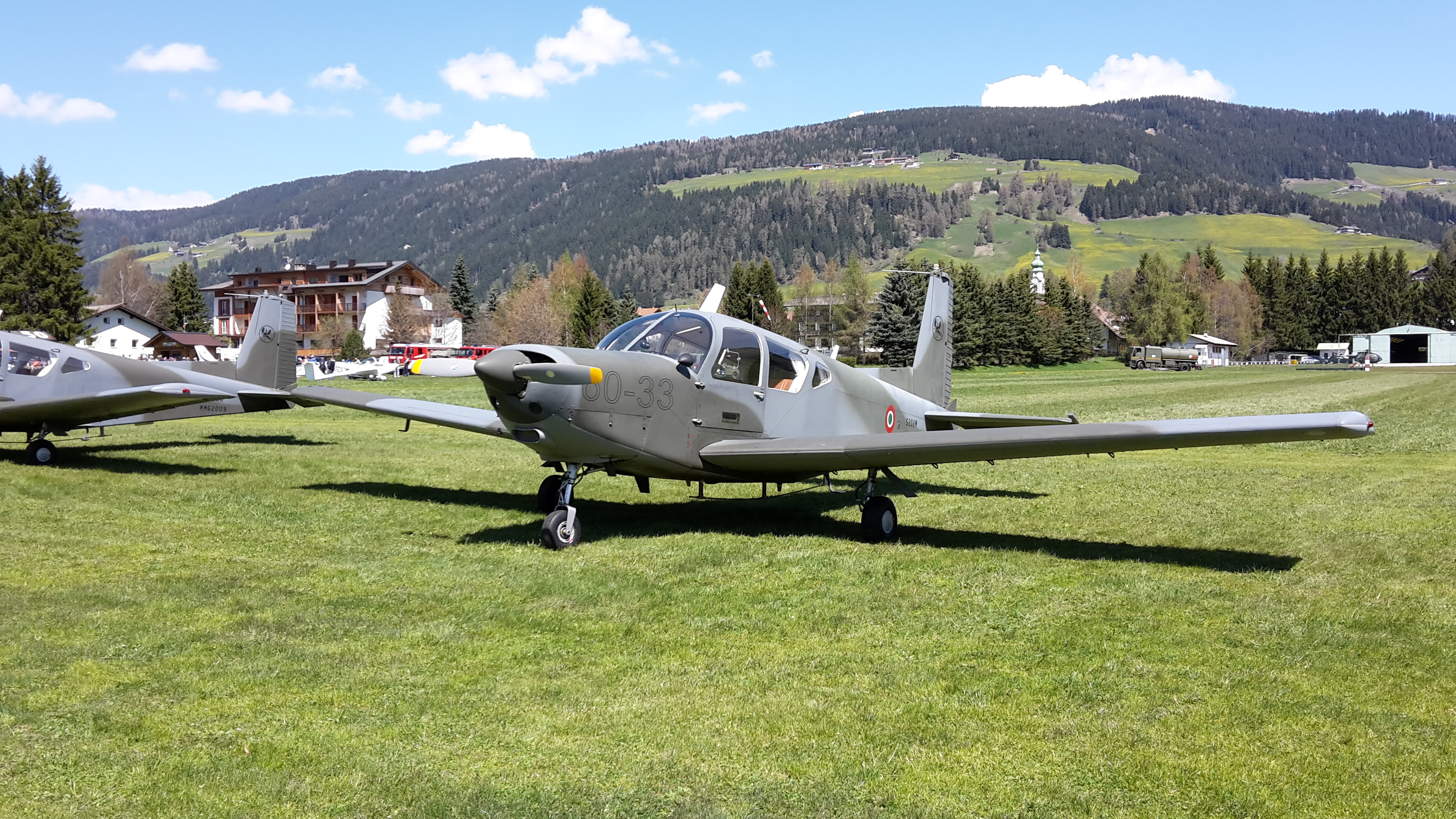
S.208M 60-33 of the 60° Stormo at Toblach Airport

The 1st Air Region carries out territorial functions and serves as a liaison with local authorities and regional administrations in the North of Italy.

- 1st Air Region (1ª Regione Aerea), in Milan
  - Capo Mele Air Force Detachment (Distaccamento Aeronautica Militare di Capo Mele)
  - Toblach Airport Detachment (Distaccamento Aeroportuale Dobbiaco), at Toblach Airport
  - Airport Command - Headquarters of the Air Fleet Command - 1st Air Region (Comando Aeroporto - Quartier Generale del Comando Squadra Aerea - 1ª Regione Aerea), at Linate Air Base
    - Operational Technical Services Group (Gruppo Servizi Tecnici Operativi)
    - Operational Logistics Services Group (Gruppo Servizi Logistici Operativi)
    - Force Protection Company (Compagnia Protezione delle Forze)
  - Air Force Area Support Logistics Center/ High School "Umberto Maddalena" (Centro Logistico di Supporto Areale dell'Aeronautica Militare/ Istituto "Umberto Maddalena"), in Cadimare
    - High School "Umberto Maddalena" (Istituto "Umberto Maddalena")
    - General Services Group (Gruppo Servizi Generali)

==== 1st Special Operations Air Brigade ====
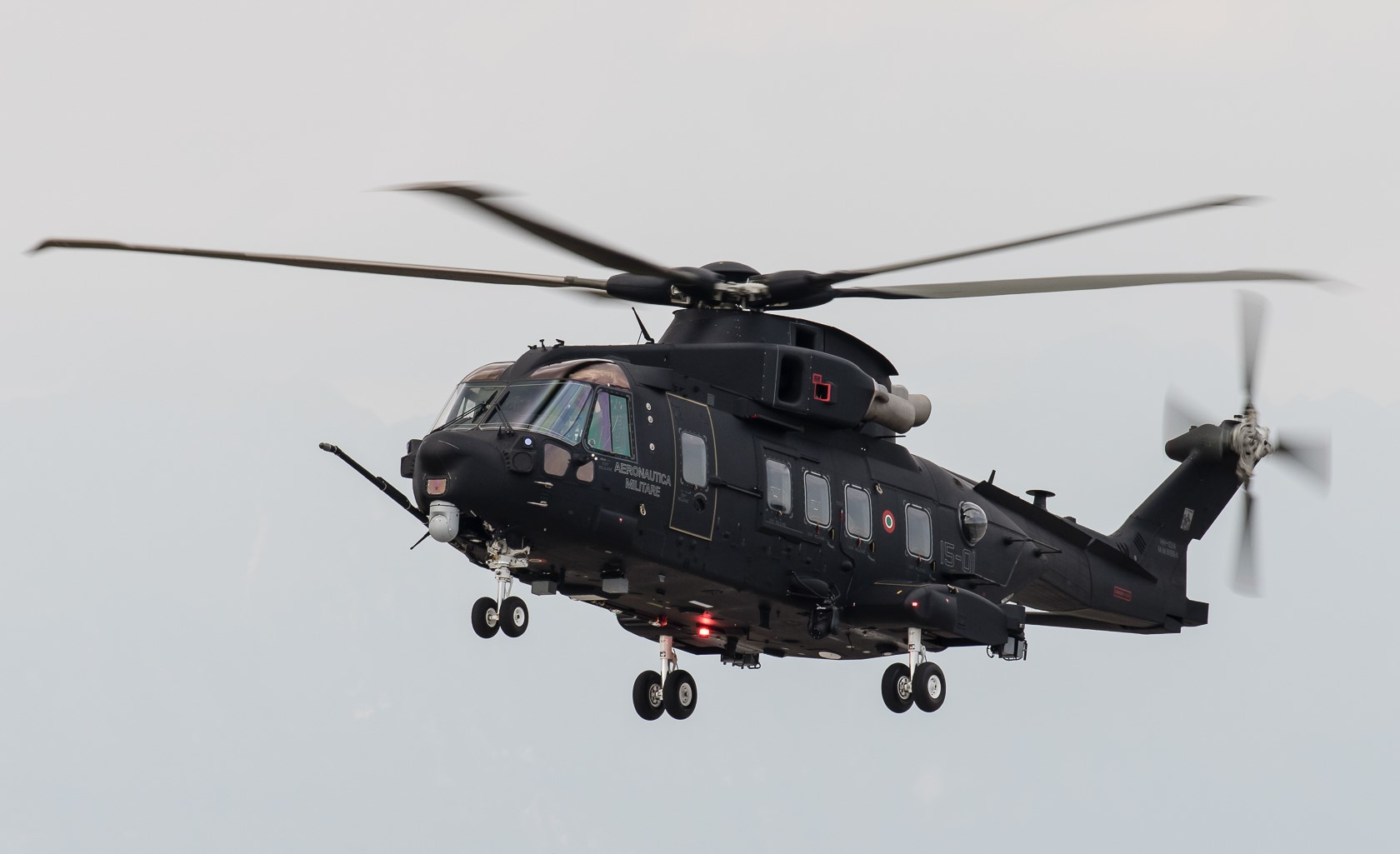
AW-101A 15-01 of the 15th Wing

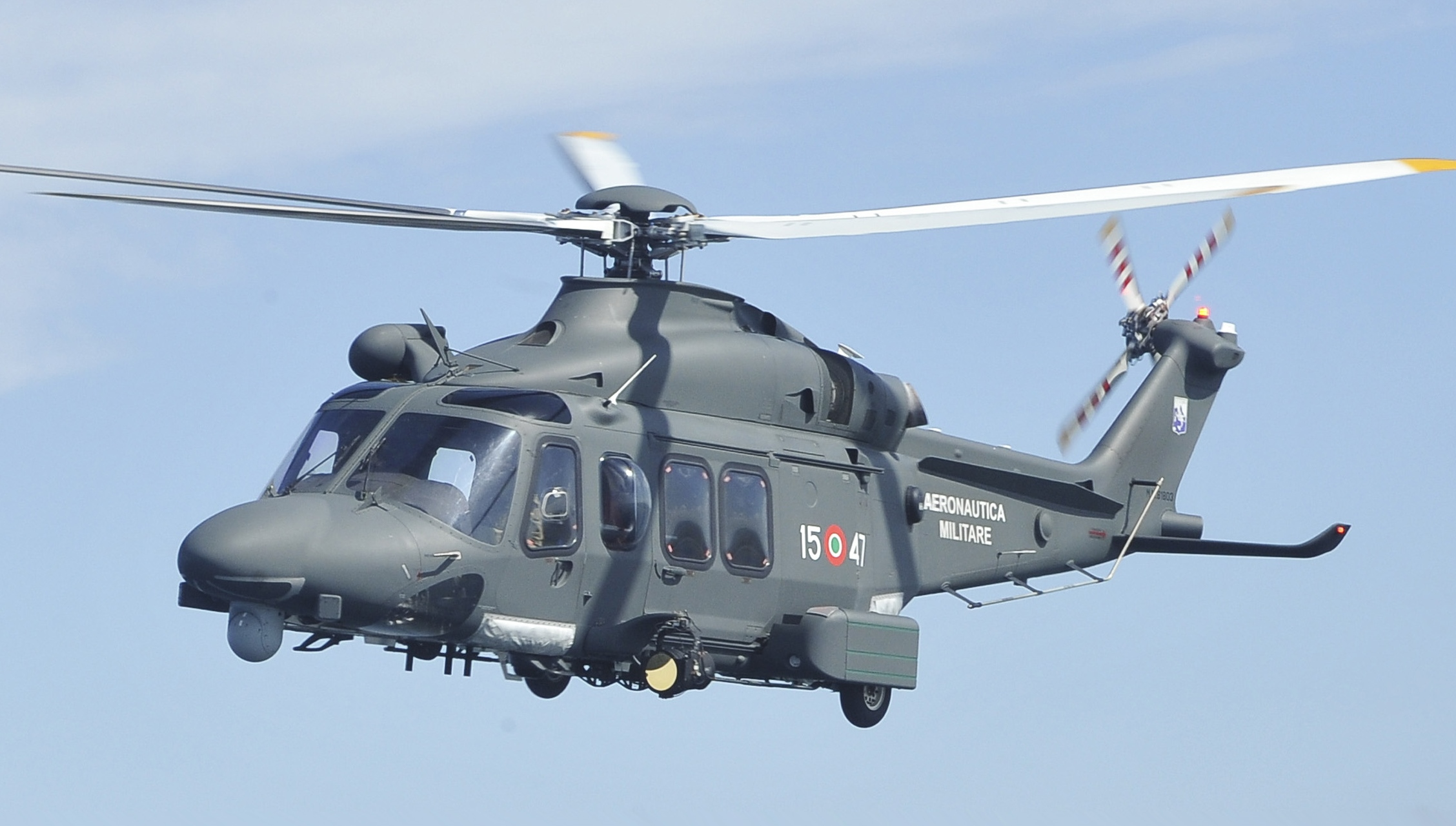
AW-139A 15-47 of the 15th Wing

The 1st Special Operations Air Brigade ensures the qualification, training, specialization, and operational readiness of Special Operations Forces, Special Operations Tactical Support Forces, and Special Operations aircrews. It guarantees the continuous updating, standardization, and interoperability of tactics, techniques, and procedures. The Brigade ensures the execution of the full spectrum of special operations and personnel recovery in hostile environments, while providing the capabilities required to form a Joint Special Operations Air Task Group (JSOATG). Furthermore, it oversees resource management and the operational efficiency of weapon systems, and contributes to the development of Special Operations doctrine and the employment procedures for its subordinate units.

- 1st Special Operations Air Brigade "Vezio Mezzetti" (1ª Brigata Aerea Operazioni Speciali "Vezio Mezzetti"), at Furbara Air Base
  - 9th Wing "Francesco Baracca" (9° Stormo "Francesco Baracca"), at Grazzanise Air Base (Combat Search and Rescue (CSAR) Wing)
    - 21st Flight Group (21° Gruppo Volo), with AW-101A helicopters
    - Air-Fusiliers Group (Gruppo Fucilieri dell'Aria)
    - Aircraft Efficiency Group (Gruppo Efficienza Aeromobili)
  - 17th Raiders Wing (17° Stormo Incursori), at Furbara Air Base (Tier-1 Special Forces)
    - Operational Group (Gruppo Operativo)
    - Training Group (Gruppo Addestramento)
    - Support Services Group (Gruppo Servizi di Supporto)
    - Force Protection Company (Compagnia Protezione delle Forze)

==== 9th ISTAR-EW Air Brigade ====
The 9th ISTAR-EW Brigade conducts operational, intelligence, and support activities within the fields of Intelligence, Surveillance, Target Acquisition, and Reconnaissance (ISTAR) and Electronic Warfare (EW) in support of joint, allied, and coalition operations.

- 9th ISTAR-EW Air Brigade (9ª Brigata Aerea ISTAR-EW), at Pratica di Mare Air Base
  - Air Force Geo-topographic Information Center (Centro Informazioni Geotopografiche Aeronautiche - CIGA), at Pratica di Mare Air Base
  - National Aerospace Meteorology and Climatology Center (Centro Nazionale di Meteorologia e Climatologia Aerospaziale - CNMCA), at Pratica di Mare Air Base
    - Air Force Mountain Center Monte Cimone (Centro Aeronautica Militare di Montagna Monte Cimone), on Monte Cimone
  - Pratica di Mare Air Base Command (Comando Aeroporto Pratica di Mare), at Pratica di Mare Air Base
    - Operational Technical Services Unit (Reparto Servizi Tecnici Operativi)
    - Operational Logistics Services Unit (Reparto Servizi Logistico Operativi)
    - Force Protection Group (Gruppo Protezione delle Forze)
  - Electronic Warfare Operational Technical Support Unit (Reparto Supporto Tecnico Operativo Guerra Elettronica - ReSTOGE), at Pratica di Mare Air Base
    - Operational Support Group (Gruppo Supporto Operativo)
    - Technical Support Group (Gruppo Supporto Tecnico)

==== Air Fleet Command - 1st Air Region organization graphic ====
Air Fleet Command - 1st Air Region organization as of November 2026 (click to enlarge)

=== Logistic Command ===
The Logistics Command is headquartered in Rome and serves as the top-level command for the air force’s logistics organizations. The command is led by an Air Squadron General (Lieutenant General equivalent), who reports directly to the Chief of Staff of the Italian Air Force. The command exercises authority over the technical, logistical, and administrative functions of the Italian Air Force, ensuring the support necessary to maintain its maximum operational capability.

- Logistic Command (Comando Logistico), in Rome
  - Aeronautical and Space Experimentation Air Division (Divisione Aerea di Sperimentazione Aeronautica e Spaziale - DASAS), at Pratica di Mare Air Base
  - 2nd Division - Technical Operational Support of Aircraft, Armament, Avionics (2ª Divisione - Supporto Tecnico Operativo Aeromobili Armamento Avionica), in Rome
  - 3rd Division - Technical Operational Support of Command and Control Systems (3ª Divisione - Supporto Tecnico-Operativo Sistemi Comando e Controllo), in Rome
  - Supports Service (Servizio dei Supporti), in Rome
  - Commissariat and Administration Service (Servizio Commissariato e Amministrazione), in Rome
  - Infrastructure Service (Servizio Infrastrutture), in Rome
  - Air Force Medical Service (Servizio Sanitario Aeronautica Militare), in Rome
  - Autonomous Region Sardinia Air Force Command (Comando Aeronautica Militare per la Regione Autonoma Sardegna), in Cagliari
  - Salto di Quirra Joint Experimentation and Training Range (Poligono Sperimentale e di Addestramento Interforze di Salto di Quirra), in Perdasdefogu

==== Aeronautical and Space Experimentation Air Division ====
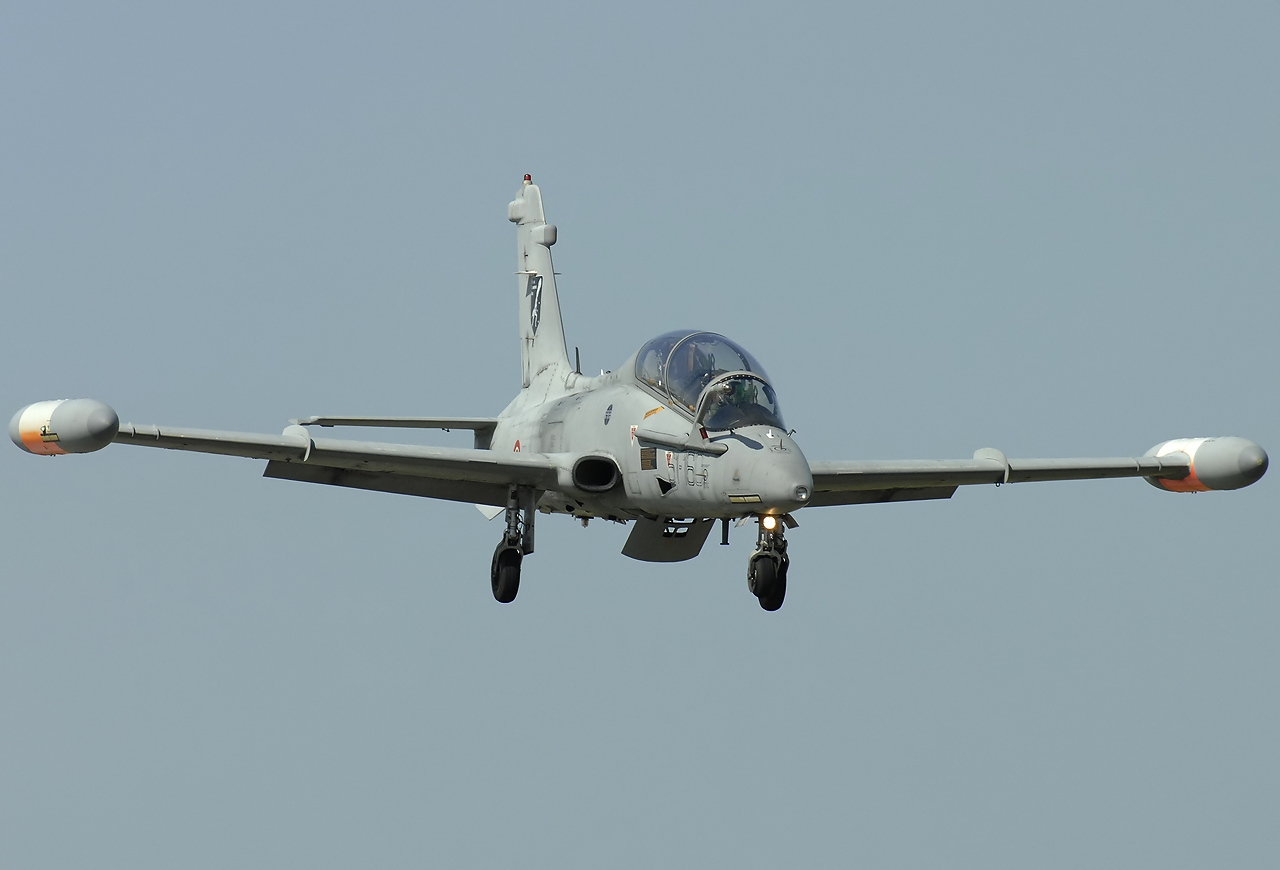
MB-339CDII of the Experimental Flight Unit

The Aeronautical and Space Experimentation Air Division was formed in 2021 and is headquartered at the Pratica di Mare Air Base. The division is tasked with the interdisciplinary studying, experimentation, testing, technical-operational evaluation, and research of new aeronautical weapon systems.

- Aeronautical and Space Experimentation Air Division (Divisione Aerea di Sperimentazione Aeronautica e Spaziale - DASAS), at Pratica di Mare Air Base
  - Operations Unit (Reparto Operazioni)
  - Operational Technical Services Unit (Reparto Servizi Tecnici Operativi)
  - Operational Logistics Services Unit (Reparto Servizi Logistico Operativi)
  - Experimental Flight Unit (Reparto Sperimentale di Volo), at Pratica di Mare Air Base
    - 311th Flight Group (311° Gruppo Volo), with various types of aircraft
    - Technical Group (Gruppo Tecnico)
    - Software Management Group (Gruppo Gestione Software)
    - Aerospace Engineering Group (Gruppo Ingegneria per l’Aero-Spazio)
    - Armament and Countermeasures Group (Gruppo Armamento e Contromisure)
  - Aeronautical and Space Materials Technologies Unit (Reparto Tecnologie Materiali Aeronautici e Spaziali), at Pratica di Mare Air Base
    - Structural Materials Group (Gruppo Materiali Strutturali)
    - Consumable Materials Group (Gruppo Materiali di Consumo)
    - Ballistics Investigation Group (Gruppo Indagini Balistiche)
    - Technical Investigation Group (Gruppo Indagini Tecniche)
    - Chemical and Physical Analysis and Testing Group (Gruppo Analisi e prove Chimiche e Fisiche)
  - Aeronautical and Space Medicine Unit (Reparto Medicina Aeronautica e Spaziale), at Pratica di Mare Air Base
    - High Altitude and Extreme Environments Group (Gruppo Alta Quota ed Ambienti Estremi)
    - Biodynamics Group (Gruppo Biodinamica)
    - Human Factors Group (Gruppo Fattori Umani)

==== 2nd Division ====
The 2nd Division provides the technical directives for carrying out maintenance at the Italian Air Force's maintenance centers and in the aircraft efficiency groups of flight units.

- 2nd Division - Technical Operational Support of Aircraft, Armament, Avionics (2ª Divisione - Supporto Tecnico Operativo Aeromobili Armamento Avionica), in Rome
  - 1st Department - Aircraft Support (1° Reparto - Supporto Aeromobili), in Rome
    - 1st Technical Service Detachment (1° Servizio Tecnico Distaccato), in Caselle liaison with Leonardo Aircraft Division and Leonardo Electronics Division
    - 2nd Technical Service Detachment (2° Servizio Tecnico Distaccato), in Turin liaison with Leonardo Aircraft Division
    - 3rd Technical Service Detachment (3° Servizio Tecnico Distaccato), in Villanova d'Albenga liaison with Piaggio Aerospace
    - 4th Technical Service Detachment (4° Servizio Tecnico Distaccato), at Cameri Air Base liaison with the F-35 Final Assembly and Check Out (FACO) facility
    - 5th Technical Service Detachment (5° Servizio Tecnico Distaccato), in Venezia Tessera liaison with Leonardo Helicopters Division
    - 6th Technical Service Detachment (6° Servizio Tecnico Distaccato), in Venegono Superiore liaison with the Leonardo Aircraft Division
    - 7th Technical Service Detachment (7° Servizio Tecnico Distaccato), in Barlassina liaison with Tecnologie Industriali e Aeronautiche
    - 8th Technical Service Detachment (8° Servizio Tecnico Distaccato), in Campi Bisenzio liaison with Leonardo
    - 9th Technical Service Detachment (9° Servizio Tecnico Distaccato), in Foligno liaison with OMA - Aerospace Group
    - 10th Technical Service Detachment (10° Servizio Tecnico Distaccato), in Pomezia liaison with Leonardo Electronics Division
    - 11th Technical Service Detachment (11° Servizio Tecnico Distaccato), in Frosinone liaison with Leonardo Helicopters Division
    - 12th Technical Service Detachment (12° Servizio Tecnico Distaccato), in Capodichino liaison with Tecnam
    - 13th Technical Service Detachment (13° Servizio Tecnico Distaccato), in Brindisi liaison with Avio
    - International Eurofighter Support Team, in Turin
  - 2nd Department - Armament and Avionic Systems Support (2° Reparto - Supporto Sistemi Avionici e Armamento), in Rome
    - Multifunctional Center for Aero-tactical Aircraft (Centro Polifunzionale Velivoli Aerotattici - CEPVA), at Cameri Air Base
    - 1st Aircraft Maintenance Unit (1° Reparto Manutenzione Velivoli), at Cameri Air Base (F-35 Lightning II maintenance)
    - 3rd Aircraft Maintenance Unit (3° Reparto Manutenzione Velivoli), at Treviso Air Base (Eurofighter Typhoon maintenance)
    - 5th Aircraft Maintenance Group (5° Gruppo Manutenzione Velivoli), at Capodichino Air Base (Air-to-ground armament maintenance)
    - 6th Aircraft Maintenance Unit (6° Reparto Manutenzione Velivoli), at Pratica di Mare Air Base (Helicopter and P-180 EVO+ maintenance)
    - 10th Aircraft Maintenance Unit (10° Reparto Manutenzione Velivoli), at Galatina Air Base (T-345A and T-346A Master maintenance)
    - 11th Aircraft Maintenance Unit (11° Reparto Manutenzione Velivoli), at Sigonella Air Base (P-72A ASW maintenance)
  - Cameri Airport Command (Comando Aeroporto Cameri), at Cameri Air Base
    - Operational Technical Services Group (Gruppo Servizi Tecnici Operativi)
    - Operational Logistics Services Group (Gruppo Servizi Logistici Operativi)
    - Force Protection Platoon (Plotone Protezione delle Forze)
  - Logistics, Ammunition and Armament Center (Centro Logistico Munizionamento e Armamento), in Orte
    - Logistics and Supply Group (Gruppo Logistica e Rifornimenti)
    - Armament Materiel Efficiency Group (Gruppo Efficienza Materiale Armamento)
    - General Services Group (Gruppo Servizi Generali)
    - Force Protection Company (Compagnia Protezione delle Forze)
    - Northern Area Supply Group (Gruppo Rifornimenti Area Nord), in Sanguinetto
    - Southern Area Supply Group (Gruppo Rifornimenti Area Sud), in Francavilla Fontana
  - Multipurpose Logistics Center (Centro Logistico Polivalente), at Guidonia Air Base
    - Logistics and Resupply Group (Gruppo Logistico e Rifornomenti)
    - Calibration and Survival Group (Gruppo Calibrazione e Sopravvivenza)

==== 3rd Division ====
Italian Air Force radar stations as of November 2026:
Remote radar station with Selex RAT-31DL
Remote radar station with AN/FPS-117
Command and Control Centers
Abandoned station

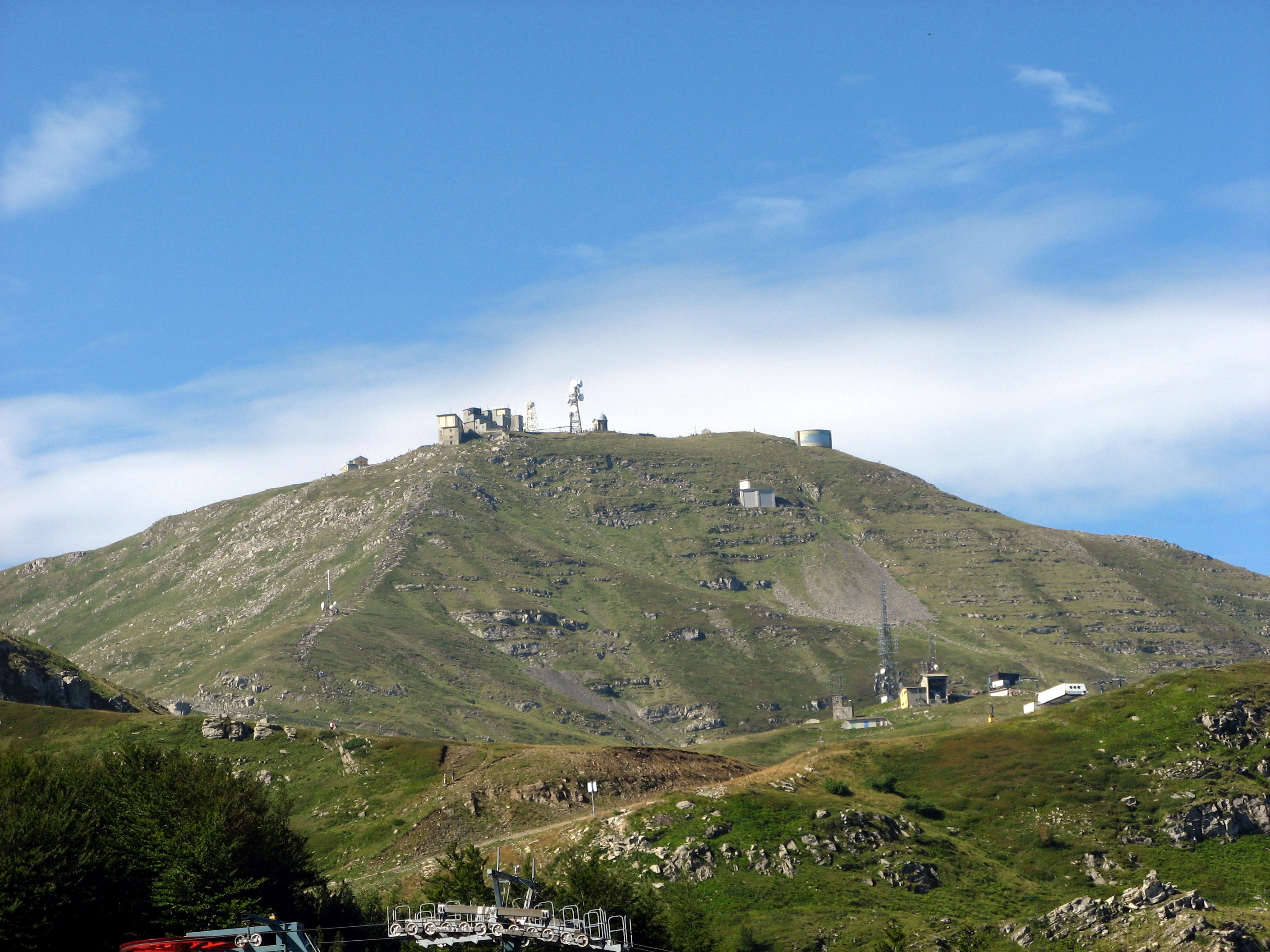
Italian Air Force installations on Monte Cimone

The 3rd Division provides operational, technical, and logistical support services for the operation and maintenance of systems related to air defence, flight assistance, telecommunications, and meteorology. Furthermore, it oversees the operation and maintenance of automated systems and manages the training of technical personnel.

- 3rd Division - Technical Operational Support of Command and Control Systems (3ª Divisione - Supporto Tecnico-Operativo Sistemi Comando e Controllo), in Rome
  - 1st Department - Air Defence Systems, Flight Assistance, Telecommunications (1° Reparto - Sistemi Difesa Aerea, Assistenza al Volo, Telecomunicazioni)
  - 2nd Department - Automated Systems (2° Reparto - Sistemi Automatizzati) providing hardware and software support
  - Command and Control Systems Management and Innovation Unit (Reparto Gestione e Innovazione Sistemi di Comando e Controllo), at Pratica di Mare Air Base (manages the air force's classified communication network)
    - Command and Control Systems Management Group (Gruppo Gestione Sistemi Comando e Controllo)
    - C4-ISR Innovation Development and Experimentation Group (Gruppo Innovazione Sviluppo e Sperimentazione C4-ISR)
  - Automated Information Systems Unit (Reparto Sistemi Informativi Automatizzati)

===== 4th Communication and Air-defence Systems and Flight Support Brigade =====
- 4th Telecommunications and Air Defence and Flight Assistance Systems Brigade(4^ Brigata Telecomunicazioni e Sistemi per la Difesa Aerea e l'Assistenza al Volo - 4ª Brigata TLC e Sist. DA/AV), in Borgo Piave
  - DA/AV/TLC Training and Education Group (Gruppo Addestramento e Formazione DA/AV/TLC)
  - 112th Remote Radar Squadron (112^ Squadriglia Radar Remota), in Mortara
  - 113th Remote Radar Squadron (113^ Squadriglia Radar Remota), in Lame di Concordia
  - 114th Remote Radar Squadron (114^ Squadriglia Radar Remota), in Potenza Picena
  - 115th Remote Radar Squadron (115^ Squadriglia Radar Remota), in Capo Mele
  - 121st Remote Radar Squadron (121^ Squadriglia Radar Remota), in Poggio Ballone
  - 123rd Remote Radar Squadron (123^ Squadriglia Radar Remota), in Capo Frasca
  - 131st Remote Radar Squadron (131^ Squadriglia Radar Remota), in Jacotenente
  - 132nd Remote Radar Squadron (132^ Squadriglia Radar Remota), in Capo Rizzuto
  - 133rd Remote Radar Squadron (133^ Squadriglia Radar Remota), in San Giovanni Teatino
  - 134th Remote Radar Center (134° Centro Radar Remoto), in Lampedusa
  - 135th Remote Radar Squadron (135^ Squadriglia Radar Remota), in Marsala
  - 136th Remote Radar Squadron (136^ Squadriglia Radar Remota), in Otranto
  - 137th Remote Radar Squadron (137^ Squadriglia Radar Remota), in Mezzogregorio
  - Meteorology Technical Center (Centro Tecnico per la Meteorologia - CTM), at Vigna di Valle Air Base
  - Force Protection Company (Compagnia Protezione delle Forze)
  - 1st Technical Communications Unit (1° Reparto Tecnico Comunicazioni), at Linate Air Base
    - Maintenance Group (Gruppo Manutenzione)
    - 1st Technical Communications Unit TLC Squadron Decimomannu (1° Reparto Tecnico Comunicazioni Squadriglia TLC Decimomannu), at Decimomannu Air Base
    - 1st Technical Communications Unit TLC Squadron Padova (1° Reparto Tecnico Comunicazioni Squadriglia TLC Padova), at Padua Air Base
    - 1st Technical Communications Unit TLC Squadron Villafranca (1° Reparto Tecnico Comunicazioni Squadriglia TLC Villafranca), at Villafranca Air Base
  - 2nd Technical Communications Unit (2° Reparto Tecnico Comunicazioni), at Bari Air Base
    - Maintenance Group (Gruppo Manutenzione)
    - 2nd Technical Communications Unit TLC Squadron Ciampino (2° Reparto Tecnico Comunicazioni Squadriglia TLC Ciampino), at Ciampino Air Base
    - 2nd Technical Communications Unit TLC Squadron Trapani (2° Reparto Tecnico Comunicazioni Squadriglia TLC Trapani), at Trapani Air Base

==== Supports Service ====
The Supports Service ensures the technical efficiency and logistical support in the following area: commercial transport, customs, motorization, Air Terminal Operations, aviation/automotive fuel lubricants and aviation oxygen, fire prevention, chemical-biological-radiological-nuclear risks, photography/videography, typography, chemical-physical and ecological/environmental controls.

- Supports Service (Servizio dei Supporti), in Rome
  - 1st Department - Operational Support (1° Reparto – Supporto Operativo), in Rome
    - Air Force Technical Supply Center (Centro Tecnico Rifornimenti dell'Aeronautica Militare), at Fiumicino Air Base
      - 1st Reception and Sorting Group (1° Gruppo Ricezione e Smistamento), in Novara
      - 2nd Motor Vehicles Maintenance Group (2° Gruppo Manutenzione Autoveicoli), in Forlì
      - 3rd Motor Vehicles Maintenance Group (3° Gruppo Manutenzione Autoveicoli), in Mungivacca
      - P.O.L. Network Command (Comando Rete P.O.L.), at Parma Air Base, manages NATO's North Italian Pipeline System
      - 65th Air Force Territorial Depot (65° Deposito Territoriale dell'Aeronautica Militare), in Taranto
  - 2nd Department – Chemical-Physical Service (2° Reparto – Servizio Chimico-Fisico), in Rome
    - 1st Air Force Technical Control Laboratory (1° Laboratorio Tecnico di Controllo dell'Aeronautica Militare), at Padua Air Base
    - 2nd Air Force Technical Control Laboratory (2° Laboratorio Tecnico di Controllo dell'Aeronautica Militare), at Fiumicino Air Base
    - 3rd Air Force Technical Control Laboratory (3° Laboratorio Tecnico di Controllo dell'Aeronautica Militare), in Mungivacca
    - 4th Air Force Technical Control Laboratory (4° Laboratorio Tecnico di Controllo dell'Aeronautica Militare), at Parma Air Base
    - 5th Air Force Technical Control Laboratory (5° Laboratorio Tecnico di Controllo dell'Aeronautica Militare), at Decimomannu Air Base
    - 6th Air Force Technical Control Laboratory (6° Laboratorio Tecnico di Controllo dell'Aeronautica Militare), at Trapani Air Base
  - 3rd Wing "Carlo Emanuele Buscaglia" (3° Stormo "Carlo Emanuele Buscaglia"), at Villafranca Air Base (Out of area air base construction, management and support wing)
    - Operational Training Center (Centro Addestramento Operativo)
    - General Services Group (Gruppo Servizi Generali)
    - Mobile Operational Support Group (Gruppo Mobile Supporto Operativo)
    - Operational Support Services Group (Gruppo Servizi di Supporto Operativo)
    - Motor Transport Group (Gruppo Autotrasporti)
    - Force Protection Group (Gruppo Protezione delle Forze)

==== Commissariat and Administration Service ====
Ensures the logistical and financial support necessary for the operation of the air force's organizations, and oversees the air force's domestic and international accounting management.

- Commissariat and Administration Service (Servizio Commissariato e Amministrazione), in Rome
  - 1st Department - Commissariat (1° Reparto – Commissariato), provisioning, clothing, personal equipment department
  - 2nd Department - Administration (2° Reparto – Amministrazione), human resources department

==== Infrastructure Service ====
The Infrastructure Service is tasked with planning and executing all activities required for the maintenance, planning and construction of the air force’s real estate assets.

- Infrastructure Service (Servizio Infrastrutture), in Rome
  - 1st Department - Planning (1° Reparto – Programmi)
  - 2nd Department - Construction (2° Reparto – Lavori)
  - 1st Air Force Engineer Unit (1° Reparto Genio dell'Aeronautica Militare), at Villafranca Air Base
    - 27th Field Engineer Group (27° Gruppo Genio Campale), at Villafranca Air Base
    - 101st Detached Infrastructure Technical Service (101° Servizio Tecnico Distaccato Infrastrutture), at Cameri Air Base
      - 101st Detached Technical Service Infrastructures Off-site Works Section (101° Servizio Tecnico Distaccato Infrastrutture Sezione Lavori Fuori Sede), at Parma Air Base
    - 102nd Detached Infrastructure Technical Service (102° Servizio Tecnico Distaccato Infrastrutture), at Ghedi Air Base
      - 102nd Detached Technical Service Infrastructures Off-site Works Section (102° Servizio Tecnico Distaccato Infrastrutture Sezione Lavori Fuori Sede), in Podenzano
    - 108th Detached Infrastructure Technical Group (108° Gruppo Tecnico Distaccato Infrastrutture), at Istrana Air Base
    - 113th Detached Infrastructure Technical Service (113° Servizio Tecnico Distaccato Infrastrutture), in Poggio Renatico
  - 2nd Air Force Engineer Unit (2° Reparto Genio dell'Aeronautica Militare), at Ciampino Air Base
    - 8th Field Engineer Group (8° Gruppo Genio Campale), at Ciampino Air Base
    - 201st Detached Infrastructure Technical Service (201° Servizio Tecnico Distaccato Infrastrutture), at Pisa Air Base
    - 205th Detached Infrastructure Technical Service (205° Servizio Tecnico Distaccato Infrastrutture), at Decimomannu Air Base
    - 208th Detached Infrastructure Technical Service (208° Servizio Tecnico Distaccato Infrastrutture), at Pratica di Mare Air Base
    - 209th Detached Infrastructure Technical Service (209° Servizio Tecnico Distaccato Infrastrutture), at Grosseto Air Base
    - 210th Detached Infrastructure Technical Group (210° Gruppo Tecnico Distaccato Infrastrutture), at Viterbo Air Base
  - 3rd Air Force Engineer Unit (3° Reparto Genio dell'Aeronautica Militare), at Bari Air Base
    - 16th Field Engineer Group (16° Gruppo Genio Campale), at Bari Air Base
    - 301st Detached Infrastructure Technical Service (301° Servizio Tecnico Distaccato Infrastrutture), at Amendola Air Base
    - 302nd Detached Infrastructure Technical Service (302° Servizio Tecnico Distaccato Infrastrutture), at Gioia del Colle Air Base
    - 303rd Detached Infrastructure Technical Group (303° Gruppo Tecnico Distaccato Infrastrutture), at Galatina Air Base
    - 304th Detached Infrastructure Technical Service (304° Servizio Tecnico Distaccato Infrastrutture), at Sigonella Air Base
    - 305th Detached Infrastructure Technical Service (305° Servizio Tecnico Distaccato Infrastrutture), at Trapani Air Base
    - 308th Detached Infrastructure Technical Service (308° Servizio Tecnico Distaccato Infrastrutture), at the Air Force Academy in Pozzuoli

==== Air Force Medical Service ====
The Air Force Medical Service is responsible for studies and programs in the healthcare sector, including forensic medicine, occupational medicine, the procurement of medical supplies, aeromedical safety, hygiene, healthcare assistance, and rehabilitation.

- Air Force Medical Service (Servizio Sanitario Aeronautica Militare), in Rome
  - Medical Appeals Commission (Commissione Sanitaria d'Appello), in Rome
  - Main Infirmary (Infermeria Principale), at Pratica di Mare Air Base
  - Air Force Aerospace Medicine Institute Linate (Istituto di Medicina Aerospaziale dell'Aeronautica Militare di Linate), at Linate Air Base
  - Air Force Aerospace Medicine Institute Rome (Istituto di Medicina Aerospaziale dell'Aeronautica Militare di Roma), in Rome
  - Aeromedical Psychophysiological Center Bari (Centro Aeromedico Psicofisiologico Bari), at Bari Air Base
  - Air Force Military Department of Forensic Medicine Bari (Dipartimento Militare di Medicina Legale dell'Aeronautica Militare Bari), at Bari Air Base

==== Joint Experimentation and Training Range ====
The Salto di Quirra Joint Experimentation and Training Range is staffed by Italian Air Force, Italian Army, and Italian Navy personnel. The range provides experimental testing of missiles and targets, qualification testing for new weapon systems, as well as the acceptance testing and quality verification of mass-produced armaments. Furthermore, it hosts training activities for both domestic and foreign military units and collaborates with national and international scientific institutions.

- Salto di Quirra Joint Experimentation and Training Range (Poligono Sperimentale e di Addestramento Interforze di Salto di Quirra), in Perdasdefogu, in Perdasdefogu
  - Operational Employment Group (Gruppo Impiego Operativo) with NH-500E and AW-139A helicopters
  - Operational Logistics Services Group (Gruppo Servizi Logistico-Operativi)
  - Force Protection Group (Gruppo Protezione delle Forze)
  - Capo San Lorenzo Detachment (Distaccamento Capo San Lorenzo), in Villaputzu
  - Capo Frasca Range (Poligono Capo Frasca), in Arbus
  - Aerial Firing Experimentation and Standardization Unit (Reparto Sperimentale e di Standardizzazione al Tiro Aereo), at Decimomannu Air Base
    - Air Force Aerial Firing Experimentation and Standardization Center (Centro Aeronautica Militare Sperimentale e di Standardizzazione al Tiro Aereo)
    - Operational Technical Services Group (Gruppo Servizi Tecnici Operativi)
    - Operational Logistics Services Group (Gruppo Servizi Logistici Operativi)
    - Force Protection Company (Compagnia Protezione delle Forze)

=== Air Force Schools Command - 3rd Air Region ===
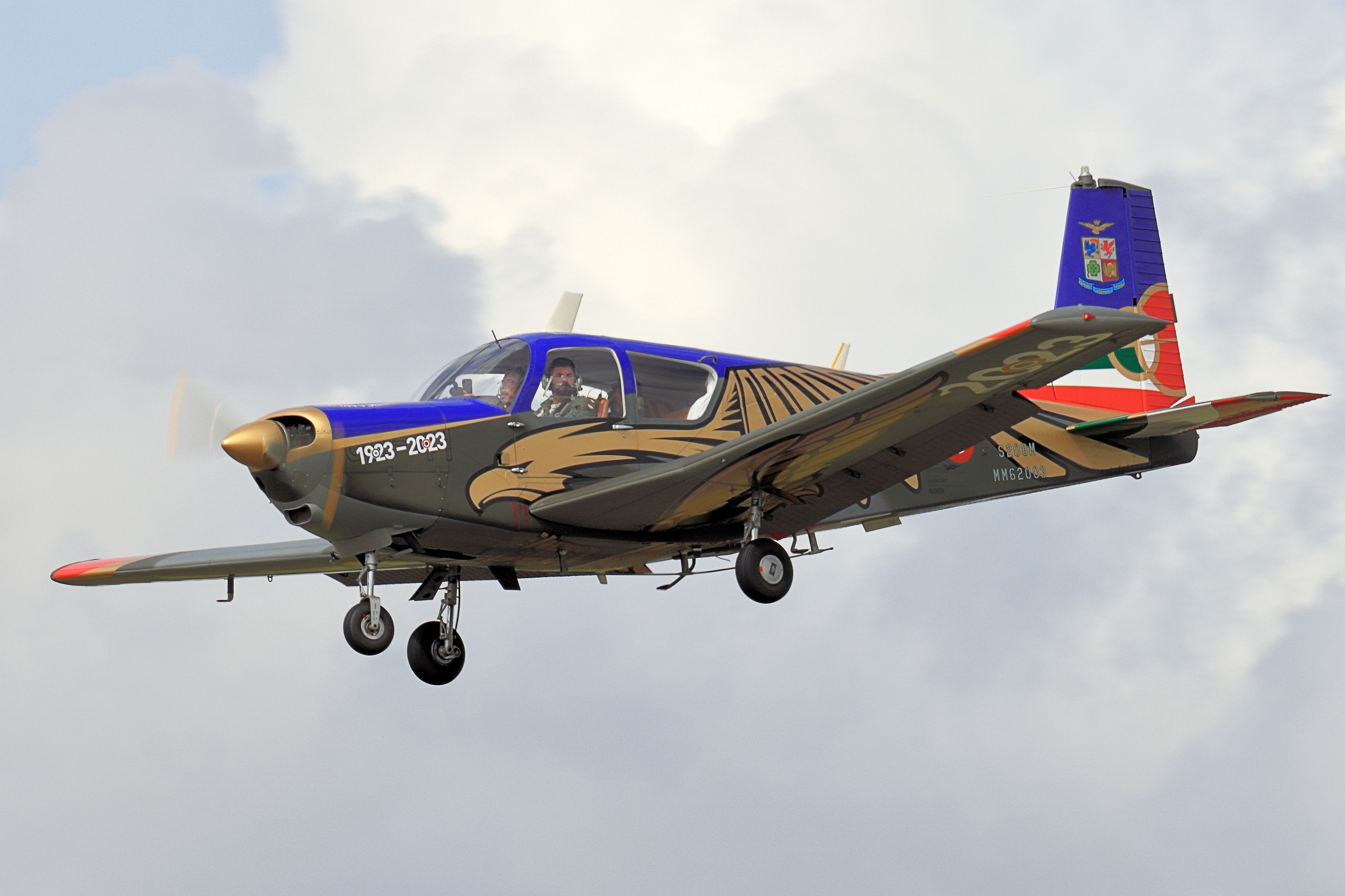
S.208M 60-41 of the 60th Wing

MB-339CDII 61-155 of the 61st Wing

T-346A Master 61-15 of the 61st Wing

The Air Force Schools Command - 3rd Air Region is headquartered in Bari and serves as the top-level command for the air force's training organizations. The command is led by an Air Squadron General (Lieutenant General equivalent), who reports directly to the Chief of Staff of the Italian Air Force. The command is responsible for the recruitment, selection, training, and basic specialized qualification of all categories of air force personnel. This includes initial flight training for aircrews, including personnel from other Italian Armed Forces or Police forces services, who aim to attain the military pilot or navigator wings. Following its merger with the 3rd Air Region, it also carries out territorial functions and serves as a liaison with local authorities and regional administrations.

- Air Force Schools Command - 3rd Air Region (Comando delle Scuole Aeronautica Militare – 3ª Regione Aerea), in Bari
  - Headquarters of the Air Force Schools Command - 3rd Air Region (Quartier Generale del Comando delle Scuole dell'Aeronautica Militare - 3ª Regione Aerea), at Bari Air Base
    - Basis Logistics Group (Gruppo Logistica di Base)
    - Support Group Brindisi (Gruppo Supporto Brindisi), in Brindisi
    - Force Protection Company (Compagnia Protezione delle Forze)
    - Alghero Airport Detachment (Distaccamento Aeroportuale Alghero), at Alghero Airport
    - Jacotenente Air Force Detachment (Distaccamento Aeronautico Jacotenente), in Jacotenente
    - Monte Scuro Air Force Detachment (Distaccamento Aeronautico Monte Scuro), on Monte Scuro
      - Mountain Survival Center (Centro di Sopravvivenza in Montagna)
    - Otranto Air Force Detachment (Distaccamento Aeronautico Otranto), in Otranto
    - Siracusa Air Force Detachment (Distaccamento Aeronautico Siracusa), in Syracuse
    - Italian Air Force Delegation - Kalamata (Rappresentanza Aeronautica Militare - Kalamata), at the Hellenic Air Force's 120th Air Training Wing's International Flight Training Center, at Kalamata Air Base, Greece
    - Italian Air Force Delegation - Sheppard AFB (Rappresentanza Aeronautica Militare - Sheppard AFB), at the US Air Force's 80th Flying Training Wing's Euro-NATO Joint Jet Pilot Training Program (ENJJPT), at Sheppard Air Force Base, USA
  - Air Force Academy (Accademia Aeronautica), in Pozzuoli
    - General Technical Services Unit (Reparto Servizi Tecnici Generali)
      - Technical Services Group (Gruppo Servizi Tecnici)
      - Various Services Group (Gruppo Servizi Vari)
      - Telematics Group (Gruppo Telematico)
      - Force Protection Platoon (Plotone Protezione delle Forze)
  - Air Force High School "Giulio Douhet" (Scuola Militare Aeronautica "Giulio Douhet"), in Florence
  - Air Force Selection Center (Centro di Selezione dell'Aeronautica Militare), at Guidonia Air Base
    - Psychological and Aptitude Department
    - Studies and Methodologies Department
  - Aviation English Training Center (Centro di Formazione Aviation English), in Loreto
    - Base Services Group (Gruppo Servizi di Base)
    - Force Protection Platoon (Plotone Protezione delle Forze)
  - Aeronautical Military Sciences Institute (Istituto di Scienze Militari Aeronautiche), in Florence
    - Didactic and Management Training Unit (Reparto per la Formazione Didattica e Manageriale)
    - Base Services Unit (Reparto Servizi di Base)
      - Technical Services Group (Gruppo Servizi Tecnici)
      - Various Services Group (Gruppo Servizi Vari)
      - Force Protection Platoon (Plotone Protezione delle Forze)
  - Air Force Non-Commissioned Officers School / Airport Command Viterbo (Scuola Marescialli dell'Aeronautica Militare / Comando Aeroporto Viterbo), at Viterbo Air Base
    - Base Services Group (Gruppo Servizi di Base)
    - Force Protection Platoon (Plotone Protezione delle Forze)
  - Air Force Specialist School (Scuola Specialisti dell'Aeronautica Militare), in Caserta
    - General Services Group (Gruppo Servizi Generali)
    - Force Protection Platoon (Plotone Protezione delle Forze)
  - Air Force Volunteer School (Scuola Volontari dell'Aeronautica Militare), in Taranto
    - Base Services Group (Gruppo Servizi di Base)
    - Force Protection Platoon (Plotone Protezione delle Forze)
  - Air Transport Training School (Scuola Addestramento Trasporti Aerei), at Pratica di Mare Air Base
    - 204th Flight Group (204° Gruppo Volo), with Piaggio P-180 EVO+
    - Professional Training Group (Gruppo Istruzione Professionale)
  - 60th Wing "Arturo Ferrarin" (60° Stormo "Arturo Ferrarin"), at Guidonia Air Base (Glider training)
    - Glider Group (Gruppo di Volo a Vela), with G103 Twin Astir II, Nimbus-4D, Nimbus 4M and LAK-17A gliders; S.208M and MB-339CDII aircraft, and NH-500E helicopters
    - Aircraft Efficiency Service (Servizio Efficienza Aeromobili)
    - Force Protection Company (Compagnia Protezione delle Forze)
    - Logistics Unit (Reparto Logistica)
  - 61st Wing "Carlo Negri" (61° Stormo "Carlo Negri"), at Galatina Air Base (Jet training)
    - 212th Flight Group (212° Gruppo Volo), with T-346A Master (Lead In to Fighter Training)
    - 213th Flight Group (213° Gruppo Volo), with MB-339CDII (to be replaced by T-345A) (Specialized Pilot Training)
    - 214th Flight Group (214° Gruppo Volo), with T-345A (Primary Pilot Training)
    - Aircraft Efficiency Group (Gruppo Efficienza Aeromobili)
    - Logistics Unit (Reparto Logistica)
    - Force Protection Company (Compagnia Protezione delle Forze)
  - 66th Wing (66° Stormo), at Frosinone Air Base (Joint Remotely Piloted Aircraft Flight School; activated 18 June 2026)
    - Flight Group (Gruppo Volo)
    - Aircraft Efficiency Group (Gruppo Efficienza Aeromobili)
    - Logistics Unit (Reparto Logistica)
    - Force Protection Company (Compagnia Protezione delle Forze)
  - 70th Wing "Giulio Cesare Graziani" (70° Stormo "Giulio Cesare Graziani"), at Latina Air Base (Basic training)
    - 207th Flight Group (207° Gruppo Volo), with SF.260EA trainer aircraft
    - Professional Training Group (Gruppo Istruzione Professionale)
    - Aircraft Efficiency Group (Gruppo Efficienza Aeromobili)
    - Logistics Unit (Reparto Logistica)
    - Force Protection Company (Compagnia Protezione delle Forze)
  - 72nd Wing "Marcello De Salvia" (72° Stormo "Marcello De Salvia"), at Viterbo Air Base (Helicopter training; co-located with the Italian Army's Aviation Training Center)
    - 208th Flight Group (208° Gruppo Volo), with NH-500M and AW-139M helicopters
    - Professional Training Group (Gruppo Istruzione Professionale)
    - Aircraft Efficiency Group (Gruppo Efficienza Aeromobili)
    - Logistics Unit (Reparto Logistica)
    - Force Protection Company (Compagnia Protezione delle Forze)

== Air Force Organization Graphic ==
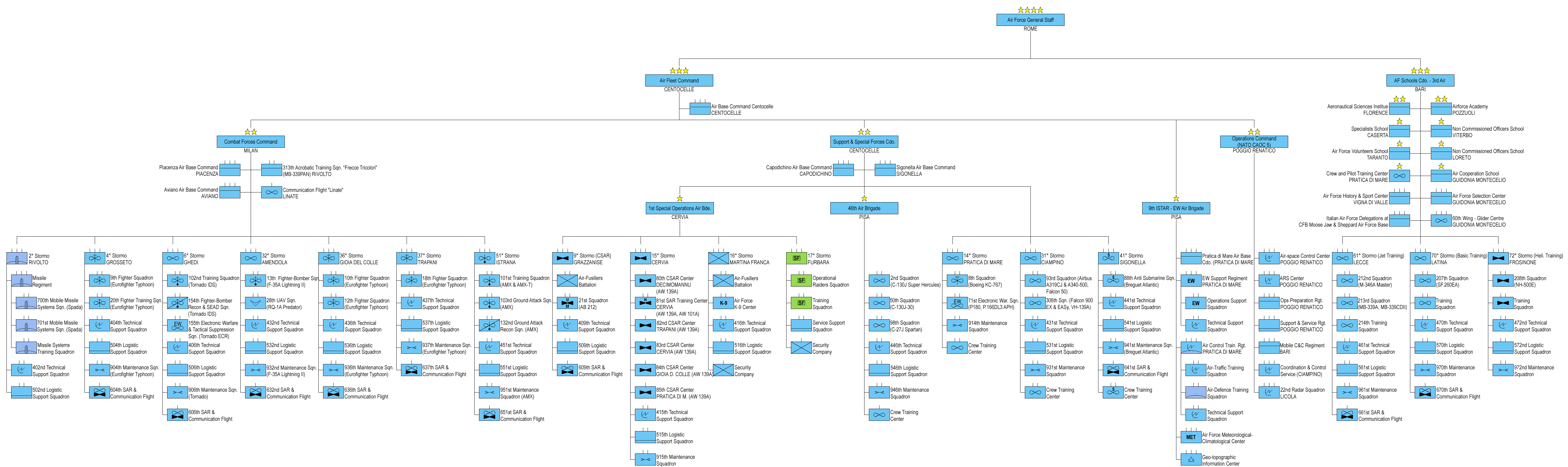
Aeronautica Militare organization 2016 (Click to enlarge)

== See also ==
- Military of Italy
  - Carabinieri
  - Guardia di Finanza
  - Italian Army
  - Italian Navy
- Structure of the Italian Army
