= Experimental Flight Unit =

- Reparto Sperimentale di Volo
- Reparto Sperimentale di Volo insignia
- Active: 15 October 1948 - present
- Country: Italy
- Branch: Air Force
- Role: Flight Test
- Size: Unit
- Headquarters: Pratica di Mare Air Base, Pomezia, Rome, Italy
- Decorations: (silver) Medal of Aeronautic Valor

Commanders
- Colonello: Morgan Lovisa

The Italian Experimental Flight Unit (Reparto Sperimentale di Volo) is a unit of the Italian Air Force responsible for flight tests and ground test of all airplanes and the related material that the Air Force owns or plans to acquire. Part of the Division of Aeronautical and Space Experimentation (Divisione Aerea di Sperimentazione Aeronautica e Spaziale - DASAS), under the Air Force Logistic Command.

== History ==
The Unit was founded in 1948 as the Experimental Flight Unit (Nucleo Sperimentale Volo) and was renamed in 1949 as the Experimental Flight Unit. It inherited purpose and materials from the Directorate of Studies and Experiences (Direzione Superiore Studi ed Esperienze - DSSE) of the Royal Italian Air Force that was destroyed during World War II. The Unit operated from Guidonia Air Base, the same as the DSSE.
In 1956, the Unit was split into the 311th Flight Squadron (311º Gruppo Volo) and the Technical Group (Gruppo Tecnico). The next year, it was moved to the Pratica di Mare Air Base as longer runways were needed.
During the development of the Panavia Tornado, the Unit was expanded further, and in 1983, the Software Management Group (Gruppo Gestione Software) was established.
The Flight Test Center (Centro Sperimentale di Volo) was established in 1999 to unify all research and testing departments of the Italian Air Force, with the Experimental Flight Unit becoming its main Unit.
To expand the reach of the Italian Air Force beyond 100 km altitude, in 2014 the Aerospace Engineering Group (Gruppo Ingegneria per L’Aero-Spazio) was established under the command of the Experimental Flight Unit as an armed forces start-up with a strong technological vocation.
The newest component of the Unit, the Armament and Countermeasures Group (Gruppo Armamento e Contromisure) was established in 2017 to test aircraft's self-defense systems.
In 2021, the Flight Test Center was reorganized in the Division of Aeronautical and Space Experimentation, and the Experimental Flight Unit has been operating under it since.
