= Grazzanise Air Base =

Grazzanise Air Base Aeroporto Militare Grazzanise "Carlo Romagnoli"
- IATA: none; ICAO: LIRM

Summary
- Airport type: Military
- Operator: Italy
- Serves: Caserta, Italy
- Elevation AMSL: 30 ft / 9 m
- Coordinates: 41°03′39″N 014°4′55″E
- Interactive map of Grazzanise Air Base

Runways
Direction	Length		Surface
Direction	m	ft	Surface
06R/24L	2,991	9,813	Asphalt
- Source: DAFIF

Grazzanise Air Base (also known as "Carlo Romagnoli Airport") (ICAO: LIRM) is an Italian Air Force air base 2 kilometres (1.2 miles) south of Grazzanise, in the Province of Caserta in the region of Campania, located about 20 kilometres (12 miles) west of Caserta (the airport for this city), and 30 kilometres (19 miles) northwest of Naples, Italy.

It has two, parallel runways (06/24) with the main, asphalt runway being 06R/24L, 2,991 metres (9,813 ft) x 30 metres (98 ft), at elevation 9 metres (30 ft). The parallel concrete runway is for limited helicopter operations, as it has no taxiway connection to the rest of the base. There is a dispersal and hangar area on the eastern end for nine aircraft, with larger maintenance hangars and parking areas at each end.

Navigation aids sited at the field are TACAN and NDB.

== Units ==
The main base complex is about 0.5 kilometres (0.31 miles) north-west of the airfield. It is the base for:

- 9º Stormo Francesco Baracca (Italian entry) (9th Combat Search and Rescue Wing), part of Support and Special Forces Command
- 2nd NATO Signal Squadron (a component of the NATO Communications and Information Agency, supporting the Allied Joint Force Command Naples)

=== Previous use ===
The air base was formerly the site of operations for squadrons equipped with the North American F-86 Sabre, Fiat G.91 and Lockheed F-104 Starfighter. An F-86 and an F-104 are mounted on a pole within the 2nd NATO Signal Squadron compound north of the air base.
