= Guidonia Air Base =

Coordinates: 41°59′25″N 12°44′27″E

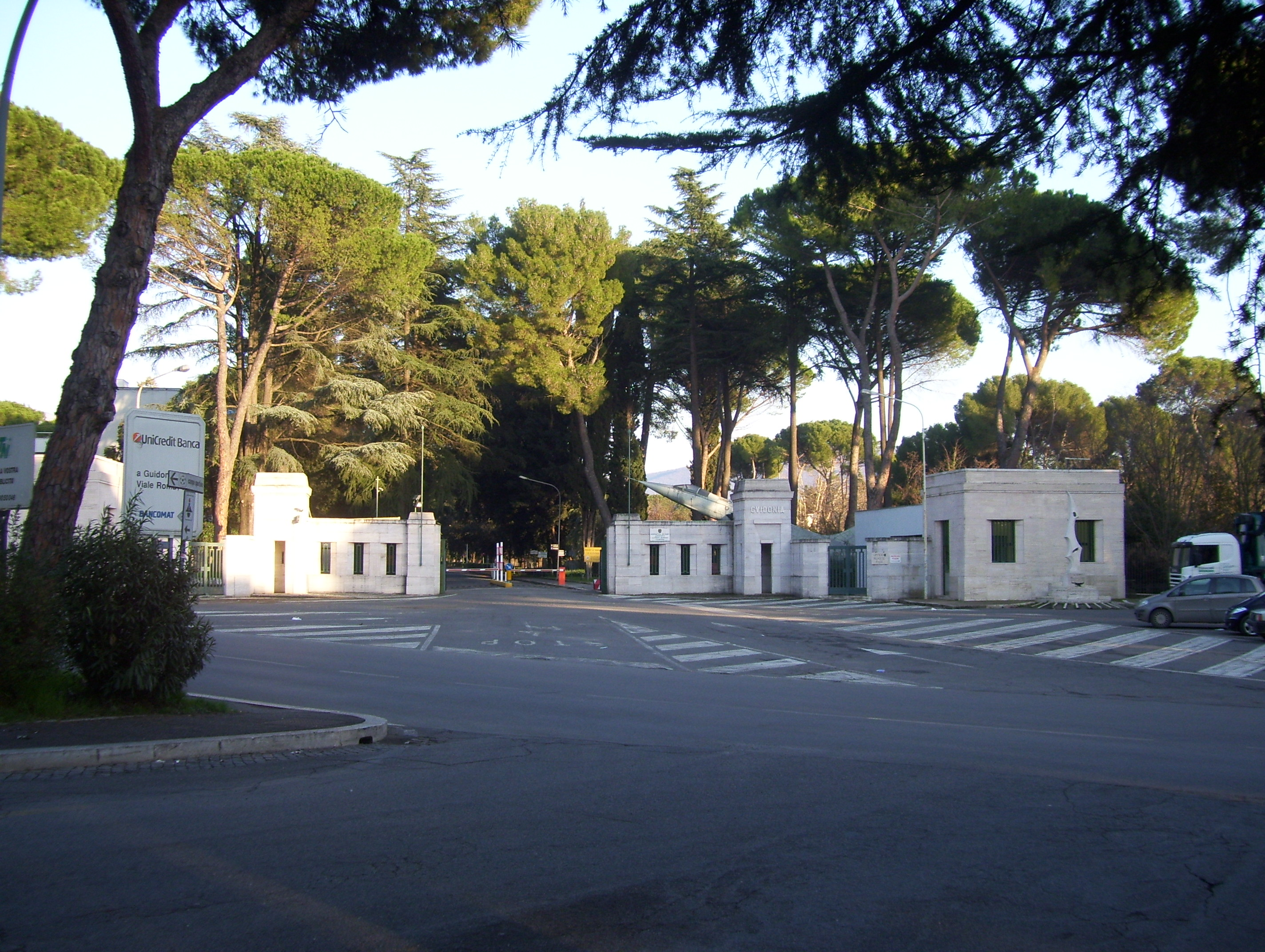
- IATA: none; ICAO: LIRG

Summary
- Airport type: Military
- Operator: Aeronautica Militare
- Location: Guidonia Montecelio, Rome
- Elevation AMSL: 345 ft / 105 m
- Interactive map of Guidonia Air Base

Runways
Direction	Length		Surface
Direction	m	ft	Surface
18/36	1,462	4,800	Asphalt

Guidonia Air Base (Italian: Aeroporto di Guidonia, ICAO: LIRG) is a military airport in Guidonia Montecelio, Province of Rome, near Rome. It is home to the Italian Air Force's main logistic center.

== History ==
The airport was built between 1915 and 1916, intended to accommodate a flying school where pilots trained during the 1st G.M. After the end of the conflict it initially became a depot for aircraft no longer used for war purposes and then became the headquarters of an experimental squadron.

The research, study and experimentation activities for technological innovation and the affirmation of the potential of the newly formed Royal Air Force, established as an armed force on March 28, 1923, underwent a strong boost in the 1920s, when aeronautical records were an excellent investment in image on the international stage.

Following the construction of the new airport, it included the facilities of the Higher Directorate of Studies and Experiences, as well as the Experimental Flight Center, present today at the Pratica di Mare Air Base, and the Aircraft Construction Plant, for the development and construction of the new aircraft.

== Gallery ==
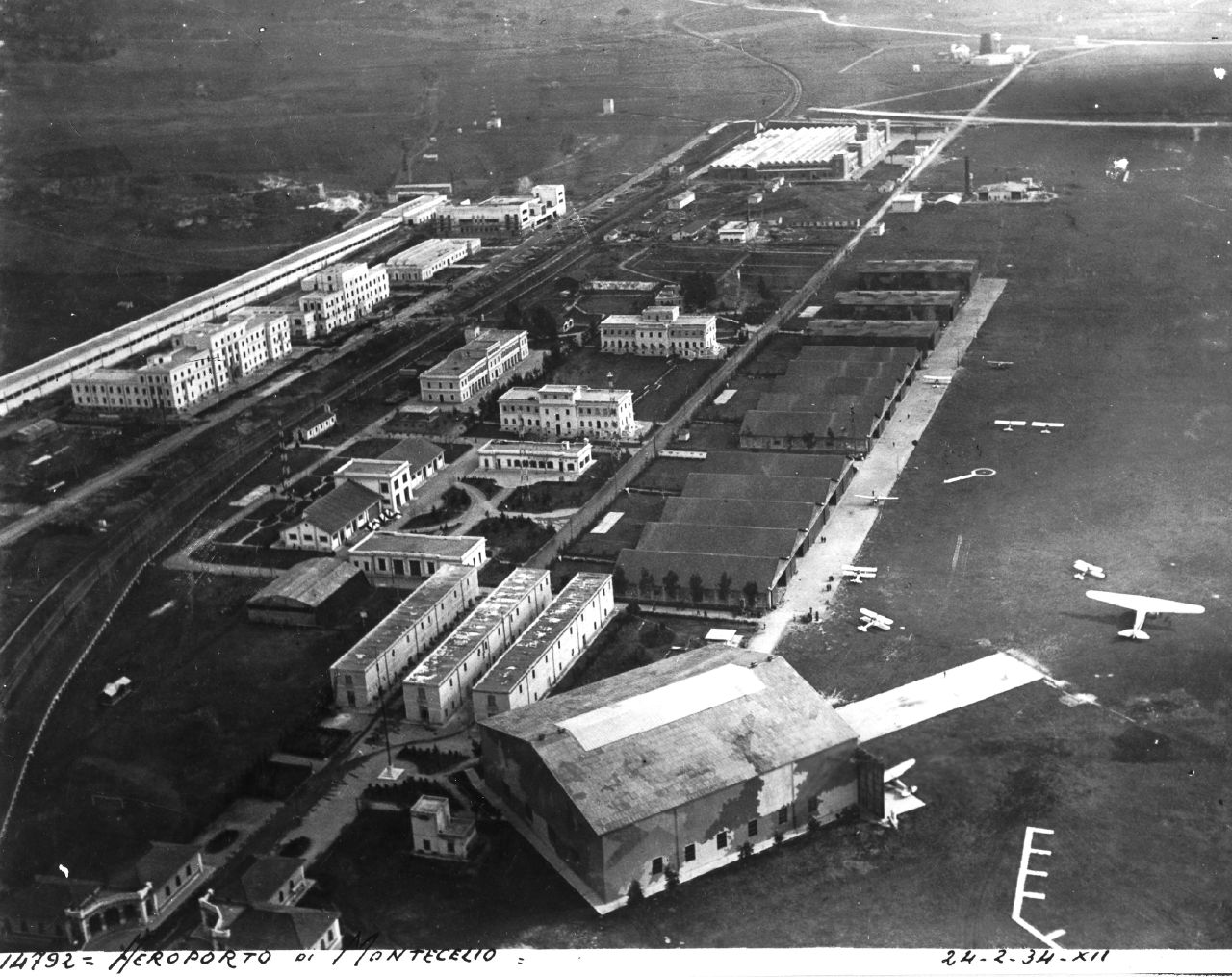
Aerial view of Alfredo Barbieri airport in Montecelio (1934)

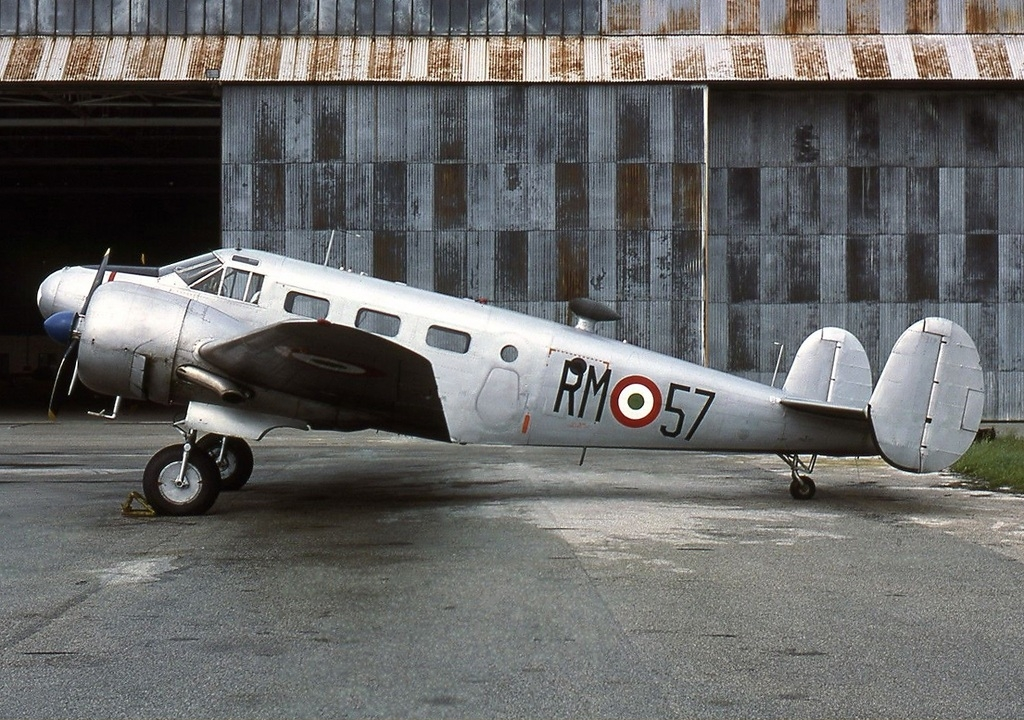
A Beechcraft C-45 Expeditor from the Aircooperation School in a 1980 photo

== See also ==
- List of airports in Italy
