= Toblach Airport =

Toblach Airport Aeroporto di Dobbiaco - Flugplatz Toblach
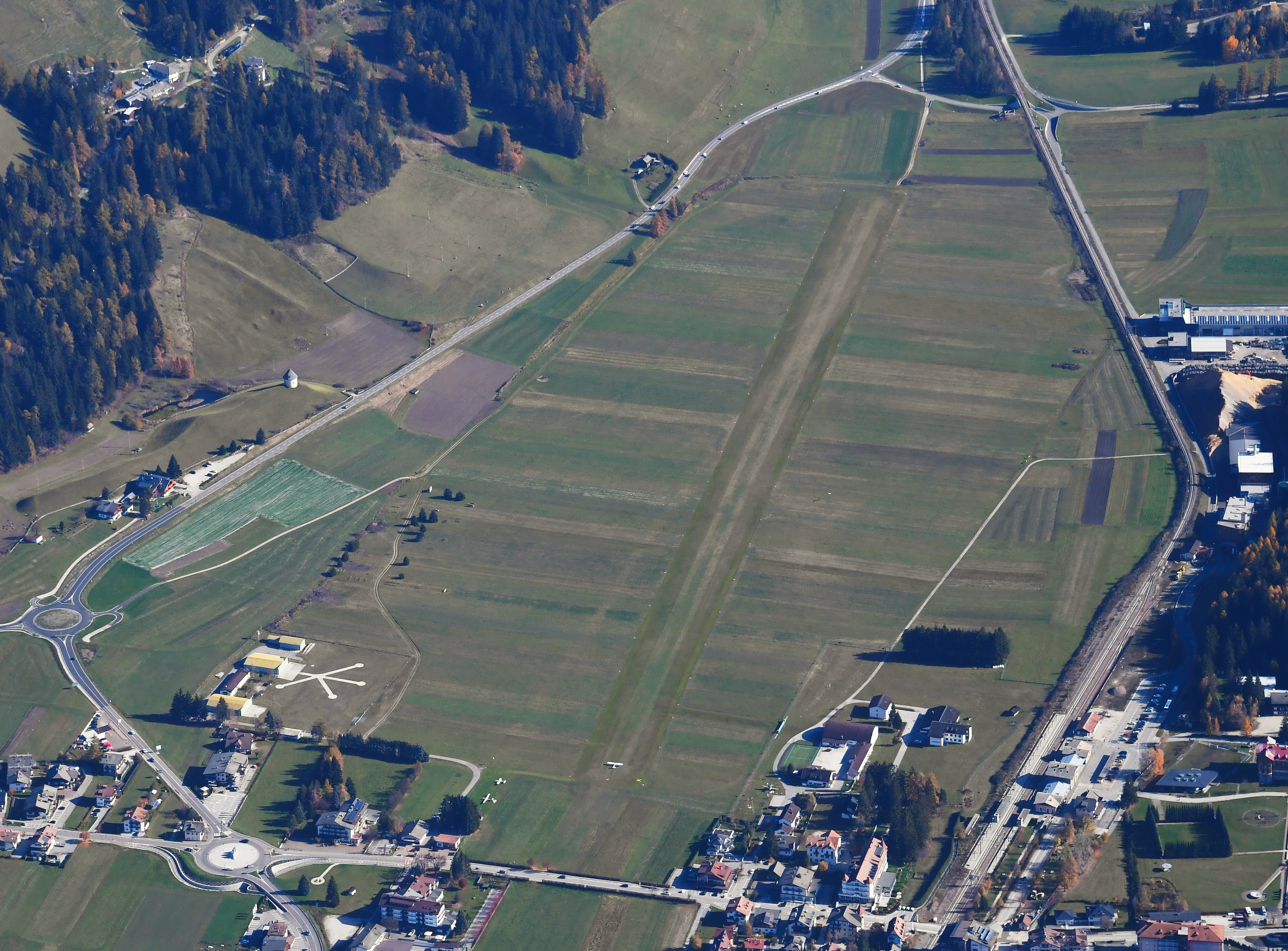
- IATA: none; ICAO: LIVD

Summary
- Airport type: Military
- Owner: Italian Air Force
- Operator: Airport Detachment Toblach
- Location: Toblach, Italy
- Built: 1915
- Elevation AMSL: 1,240 m / 4,068 ft
- Coordinates: 46°43′37″N 012°13′50″E

Map

Runways
Direction	Length		Surface
Direction	m	ft	Surface
10/28	700	2,300	Gras

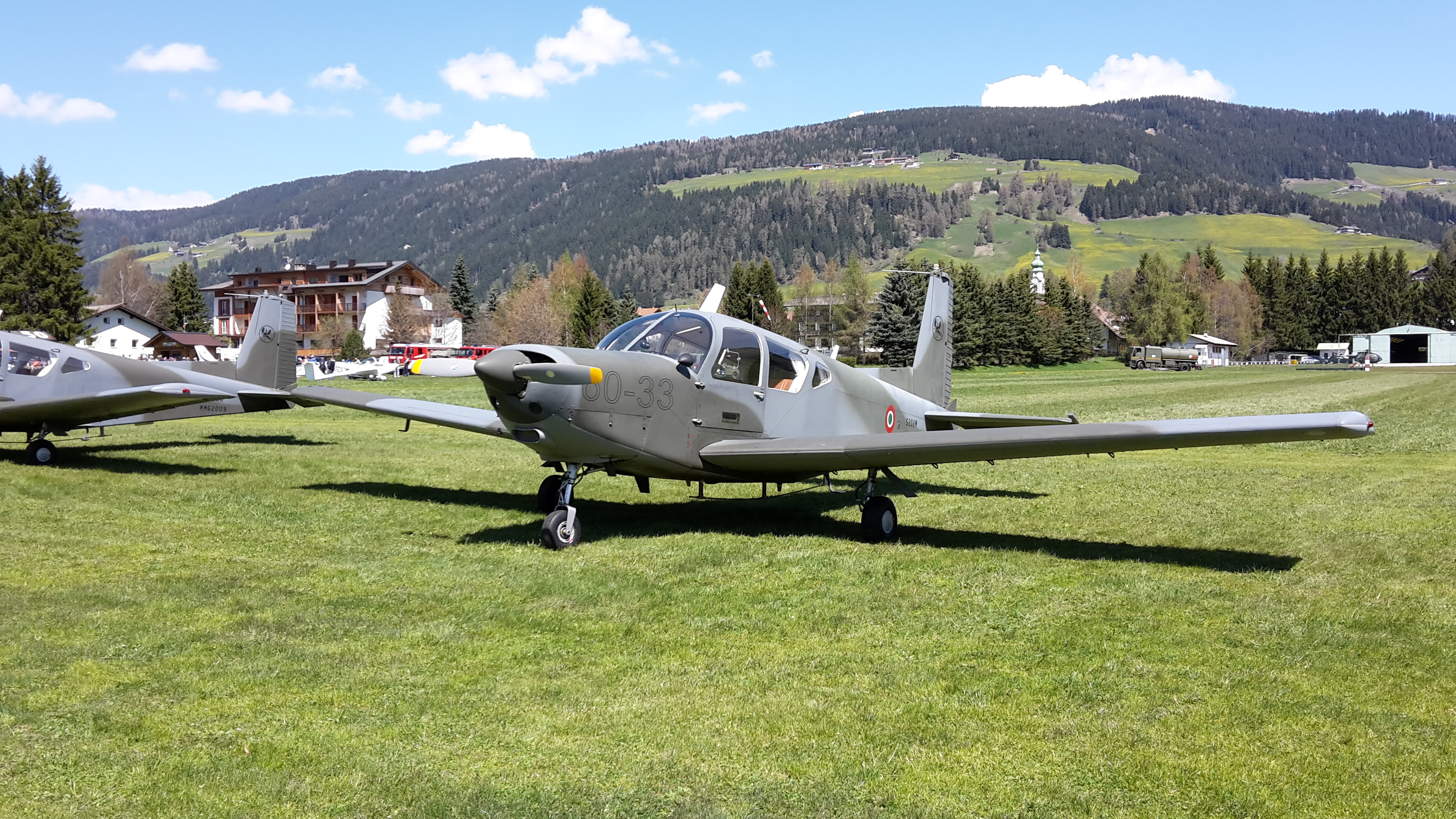
S-208M in Toblach

The Toblach Airport lies approximately 1 km to the South of the village of Toblach and is Italy's northernmost and highest airport. The military airfield has a 700m long and 50m wide grass runway and is managed by the Italian Air Force's Airport Detachment Toblach. On weekends and holidays from May to October the airport is open for civilian traffic.

== History ==
The airfield was constructed in 1915 by the Austro-Hungarian Imperial and Royal Aviation Troops during World War I as a base close to the Italian front. In 1938, the Royal Italian Air Force acquired the airfield and began to use it as a training location for winter flights and winter survival courses.

After World War II, the Italian Air Force resumed winter training at Toblach and built hangars and a recreational center for its officers. Between 1956 and 1975, the Italian Army maintained a small number of Cessna L-19E artillery observation planes for the 2nd Mountain Artillery Regiment of the Alpine Brigade "Tridentina" at the airfield. On 11 May 1966, Italian Defense Minister Roberto Tremelloni elevated the airfield to airport. In 1976, all observation planes and helicopters of the 4th Alpine Army Corps were consolidated at Bolzano-San Giacomo Air Base and since then there are no permanently based planes or helicopters at the airport. For the 50th anniversary of the founding of the airport, Italian Defense Minister Roberta Pinotti granted the Airport Detachment Toblach the use of the honor title Generale di Squadra Aerea Mario Pezzi.

Today the airport is used by the Italian Air Force and Italian Army for training purposes, the latter of which are managed by the 6th Alpini Regiment in cooperation with the 4th Army Aviation Regiment "Altair". The air force also maintains a number of holiday homes for its members and a meteorological station at the airport. Civilian airplanes may land at the airport between May and October on weekends and holidays. The airport management on these days is carried out by members of the Aero Club Dobbiaco - Toblach.

== See also ==
- Toblach
- Bolzano Airport
