= Galatina Air Base =

Galatina Air Base Aeroporto Militare Fortunato Cesari
- IATA: LCC; ICAO: LIBN

Summary
- Airport type: Military
- Serves: Lecce, Italy
- Coordinates: 40°14′21″N 018°7′59″E
- Interactive map of Galatina Air Base

Runways
Direction	Length		Surface
Direction	ft	m	Surface
			Asphalt
- Source: DAFIF

Galatina Air Base (IATA: LCC, ICAO: LIBN) is an airbase near Galatina, south of the city of Lecce in the Apulia (Puglia) region of Italy. Currently the Italian Air Force's 10th Aircraft Maintenance Unit is based there, which maintains the air force's MB-339 training and light attack jets.

== See also ==
- List of airports in Italy
