= Pomezia =

- Comune
- Comune di Pomezia
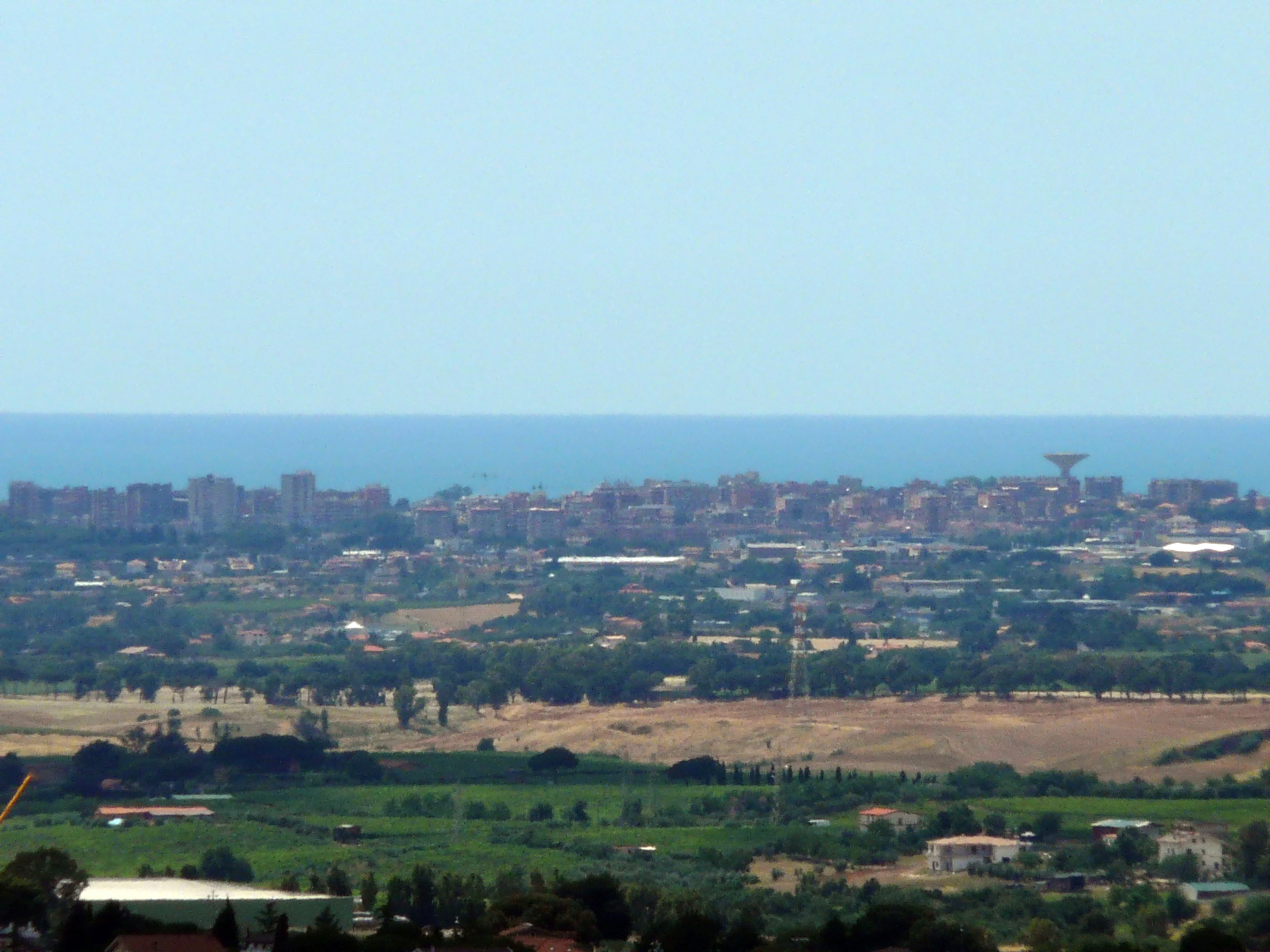
- Panorama of Pomezia

- Flag Coat of arms

- Location within Italy Location within Lazio
- Coordinates: 41°41′N 12°30′E
- Country: Italy
- Region: Lazio
- Metropolitan city: Rome (RM)
- Frazioni: Campo Ascolano, Campo Bello, Campo Jemini, Campo Selva, Castagnetta, Cinque Poderi, Colli di Enea, Macchiozza, Martin Pescatore, Pratica di Mare, Santa Palomba, Santa Procula, Sedici Pini, Torvaianica, Torvaianica Alta, Viceré, Villaggio Azzurro, Villaggio Tognazzi

Government
  - Mayor: Veronica Felici

Area
  - Total: 107.34 km^{2} (41.44 sq mi)
- Elevation: 108 m (354 ft)

Population (2025)
  - Total: 64,994
  - Density: 605.50/km^{2} (1,568.2/sq mi)
- Demonym: Pometini
- Time zone: UTC+1 (CET)
  - Summer (DST): UTC+2 (CEST)
- Postal code: 00071
- Dialing code: 0691
- Patron saint: St. Benedict of Nursia
- Saint day: July 11
- Website: Official website

Pomezia (Italian pronunciation: [poˈmɛttsja]) is a municipality (comune) in the Metropolitan City of Rome Capital, Lazio, central Italy. In 2009 it had a population of about 60,000.

== History ==
The town was built entirely new near the location of ancient Lavinium on land resulting from the final reclamation of the Pontine Marshes under Benito Mussolini, being inaugurated on 29 October 1939. Its new population was extracted from the poor peasants of Romagna, Veneto and Friuli. Peace did not last long. After being occupied by the forces of the Third Reich, Pomezia was heavily bombed during the Battle of Anzio in World War II. After the end of the war, Pomezia developed as a strong industrial center, especially in the medical and pharmaceutical sectors, as well as a recreational center. It is also home to the production plant of Italian food company Colavita.

Pratica di Mare is the frazione of Pomezia where the ruins of the ancient port of Lavinium are located, now 6 kilometres (4 mi) from the Tyrrhenian Sea. The ancient community was on some hilly ground at the mouth of a stream. Currently the flat alluvial sediment between the hill and the beach is occupied by Pratica di Mare Air Force Base, a facility of the Aeronautica Militare that also finds great utility as a secure airport and a location for air shows and races.

The name of Pomezia comes from the Latin city of Suessa Pometia, although it is unknown where Pometia was located.

== Climate ==
Climate data for Pomezia (Pratica di Mare Air Force Base) (1991–2020)
Month	Jan	Feb	Mar	Apr	May	Jun	Jul	Aug	Sep	Oct	Nov	Dec	Year
Record high °C (°F)	20.4 (68.7)	22.4 (72.3)	25.0 (77.0)	28.6 (83.5)	31.6 (88.9)	36.0 (96.8)	35.2 (95.4)	38.6 (101.5)	33.8 (92.8)	29.0 (84.2)	25.4 (77.7)	21.2 (70.2)	38.6 (101.5)
Mean daily maximum °C (°F)	13.2 (55.8)	13.5 (56.3)	15.7 (60.3)	18.2 (64.8)	22.4 (72.3)	26.4 (79.5)	28.9 (84.0)	29.5 (85.1)	26.0 (78.8)	22.3 (72.1)	17.8 (64.0)	14.2 (57.6)	20.7 (69.3)
Daily mean °C (°F)	8.9 (48.0)	9.0 (48.2)	11.2 (52.2)	13.8 (56.8)	17.8 (64.0)	21.9 (71.4)	24.4 (75.9)	24.9 (76.8)	21.4 (70.5)	17.8 (64.0)	13.7 (56.7)	10.0 (50.0)	16.2 (61.2)
Mean daily minimum °C (°F)	5.1 (41.2)	4.8 (40.6)	6.7 (44.1)	9.1 (48.4)	12.9 (55.2)	16.7 (62.1)	19.4 (66.9)	20.0 (68.0)	17.0 (62.6)	13.8 (56.8)	10.0 (50.0)	6.3 (43.3)	11.8 (53.2)
Record low °C (°F)	−4.2 (24.4)	−3.6 (25.5)	−3.0 (26.6)	−0.2 (31.6)	4.6 (40.3)	7.4 (45.3)	10.4 (50.7)	13.2 (55.8)	8.8 (47.8)	4.2 (39.6)	−0.2 (31.6)	−4.4 (24.1)	−4.4 (24.1)
Average precipitation mm (inches)	102.5 (4.04)	64.4 (2.54)	54.2 (2.13)	53.3 (2.10)	37.0 (1.46)	17.7 (0.70)	12.8 (0.50)	22.6 (0.89)	84.2 (3.31)	102.9 (4.05)	111.2 (4.38)	81.8 (3.22)	744.5 (29.31)
Average precipitation days (≥ 1.0 mm)	7.8	7.5	6.5	6.5	4.7	2.7	1.6	1.6	5.4	7.4	10.0	9.0	70.8
Average relative humidity (%)	75.8	73.5	74.9	76.1	74.8	73.3	72.3	72.8	74.0	76.1	77.5	76.1	74.8
Average dew point °C (°F)	5.2 (41.4)	4.8 (40.6)	7.2 (45.0)	10.1 (50.2)	13.9 (57.0)	17.5 (63.5)	19.8 (67.6)	20.3 (68.5)	17.1 (62.8)	14.0 (57.2)	10.2 (50.4)	6.3 (43.3)	12.2 (54.0)
Source: NOAA

== Demographics ==
Historical population

Year	Pop.	±%
1861	-	—
1871	254	—
1881	327	+28.7%
1901	504	+54.1%
1911	619	+22.8%
1921	787	+27.1%
1931	1,110	+41.0%
1936	1,372	+23.6%

Year	Pop.	±%
1951	3,644	+165.6%
1961	6,772	+85.8%
1971	19,040	+181.2%
1981	29,925	+57.2%
1991	37,512	+25.4%
2001	43,960	+17.2%
2011	56,372	+28.2%
2021	64,005	+13.5%

Source: ISTAT

== Sport ==
The most popular sport in Pomezia is football (soccer). The oldest and the biggest football club in the comune is Pomezia Calcio, which plays in Lega Pro Seconda Divisione.

== Twin towns ==
Pomezia is twinned with:

- Singen, Germany
- Çanakkale, Turkey
- Itápolis, Brazil
