= Pratica di Mare Air Base =

Coordinates: 41°39′16″N 012°26′42″E

- IATA: none; ICAO: LIRE

Summary
- Airport type: Military
- Operator: Aeronautica Militare
- Location: Pomezia, Province of Rome
- Elevation AMSL: 42 ft (13 m)
- Interactive map of Pratica di Mare Air Base

Runways
Direction	Length		Surface
Direction	m	ft	Surface
13L/31R	2,480	8,138	Asphalt
13/31 (CLOSED)	2,540	8,335	Asphalt
- Source: DAFIF

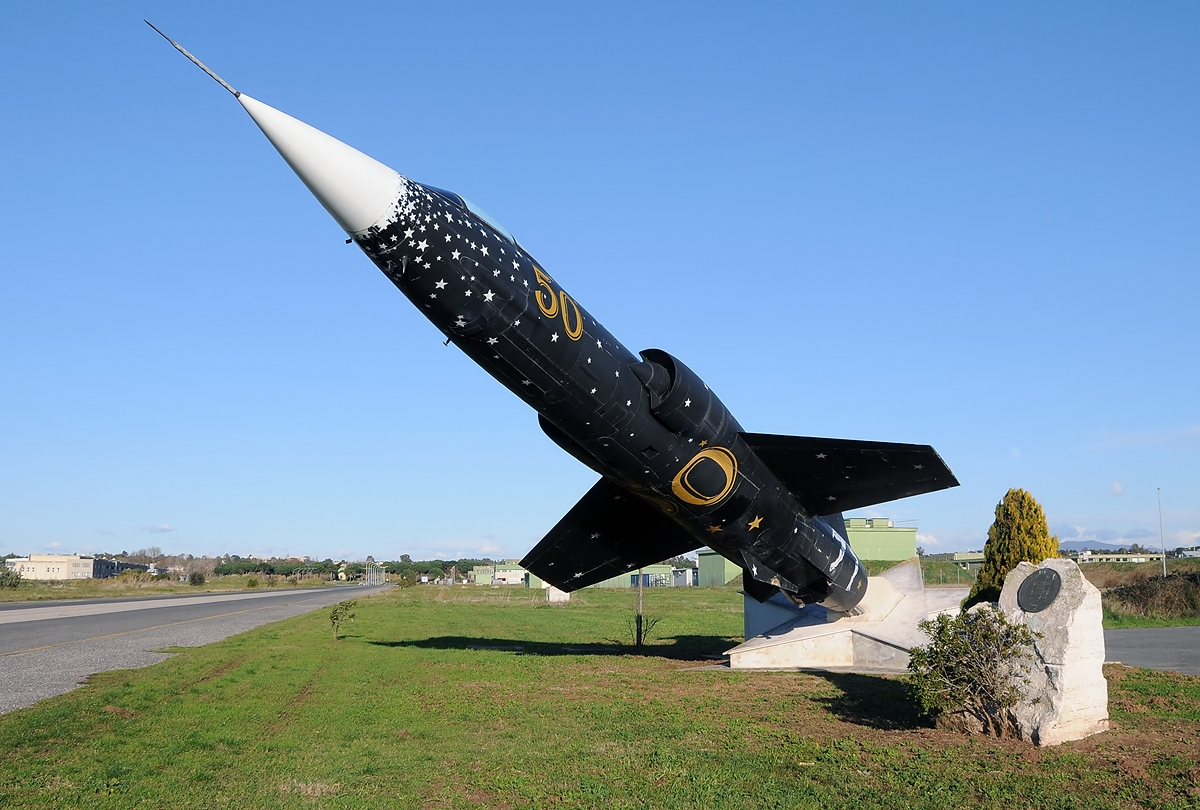

Pratica di Mare Air Base (ICAO: LIRE) is a military airport of the Italian Air Force, located in Pomezia, Lazio, southwest of Rome. It was established as a flight training airfield in 1937. In 1957, it was named after Colonnello Mario de Bernardi, winner of the 1926 Schneider Trophy and test pilot. It is one of the largest Italian air bases.
