= List of municipalities of the Province of Ogliastra =

The following is a list of the 23 municipalities (comuni) of the Province of Ogliastra in the autonomous region of Sardinia in Italy.

== List ==
Municipality	Native name	Population (2026)	Area (km²)	Density
Arzana	Àrthana	2,199	162.49	13.5
Bari Sardo	Barì	3,770	37.43	100.7
Baunei	Baunèi	3,366	211.90	15.9
Cardedu	Cardèdu	2,002	33.39	60.0
Elini	Elìni	555	10.65	52.1
Gairo	Gàiru	1,272	77.49	16.4
Girasole	Gelisùli	1,369	13.16	104.0
Ilbono	Irbòno	1,966	31.13	63.2
Jerzu	Jèrsu	2,912	102.41	28.4
Lanusei	Lanusè	4,881	53.17	91.8
Loceri	Lòceri	1,345	19.37	69.4
Lotzorai	Lotzorài	2,122	16.87	125.8
Osini	Osìni	681	39.81	17.1
Perdasdefogu	Foghèsu	1,689	77.75	21.7
Seui	Seùi	1,137	148.21	7.7
Talana	Talàna	913	118.68	7.7
Tertenia	Tertenìa	3,834	117.65	32.6
Tortolì	Tortolì	10,994	40.29	272.9
Triei	Trièi	1,060	32.98	32.1
Ulassai	Ulàssa	1,365	122.41	11.2
Urzulei	Orthullè	1,024	129.64	7.9
Ussassai	Ussàssa	432	47.32	9.1
Villagrande Strisaili	Biddamànna Strisàili	2,834	210.35	13.5

== See also ==
- List of municipalities of Sardinia
- List of municipalities of Italy
