= Monte Perda Liana =

Mountain and geological formation in Sardinia, Italy

- Perda 'e Liana (Sardinian language)
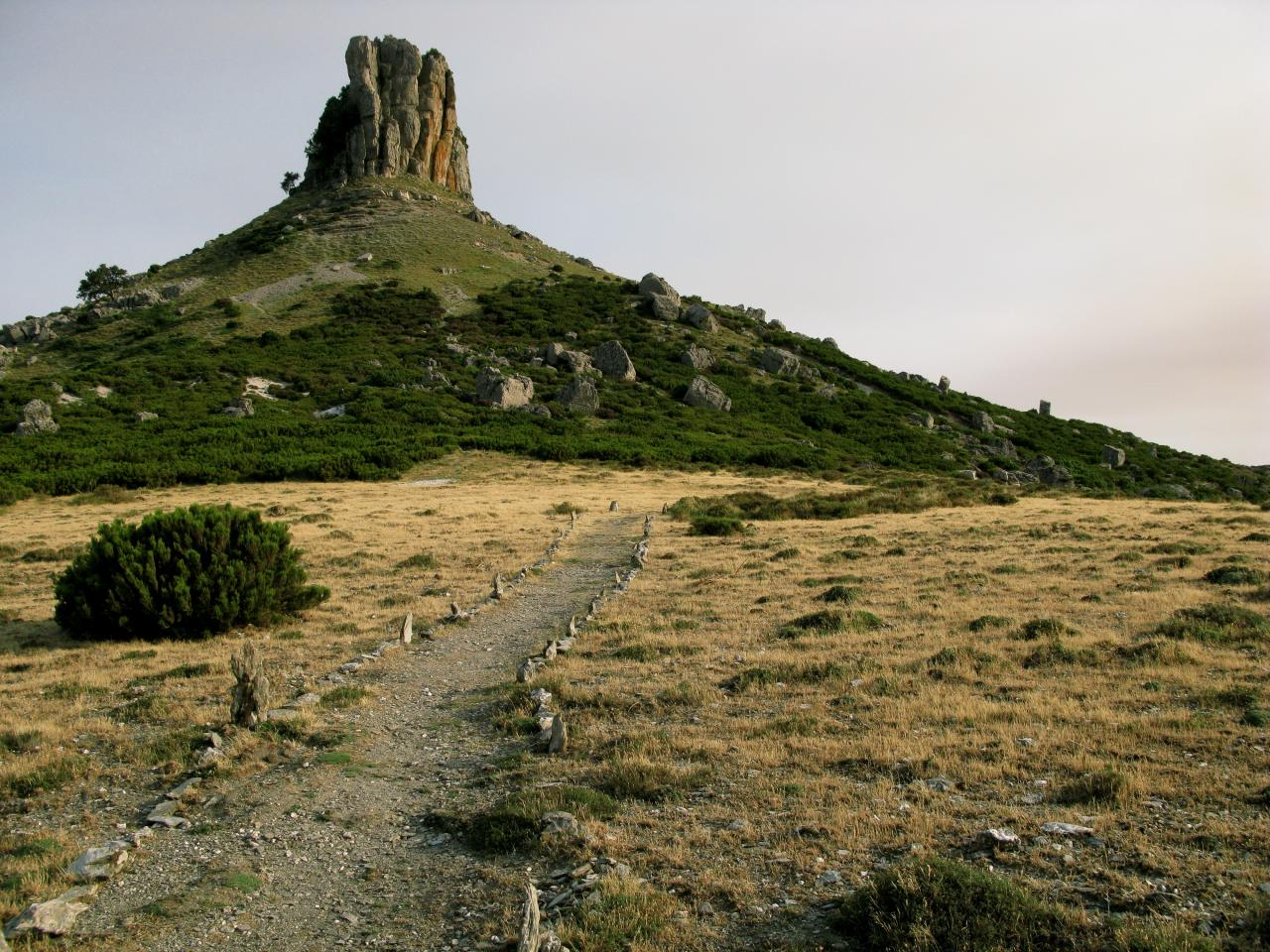
- Monte Perda Liana

Highest point
- Elevation: 1,293 m (4,242 ft)
- Coordinates: 39°54′34″N 09°24′40″E

Geography
- Country: Italy
- Region: Sardinia

The Monte Perda Liana (Perda 'e Liana in Sardinian) is a distinctive mountain formation classified as a geological tacco. It is located in central-eastern Sardinia, at the boundary between the Barbaricina sub-region of Ogliastra and that of Barbagia di Seùlo.

It is situated within the administrative territory of Gairo. At 1,293 m a.s.l., it is also the highest among the tacchi of Ogliastra.

== Description ==
=== Name origin ===
The name of the mountain is composed of the words perda, which identifies a rocky mass, and liana, which, depending on the theories, may derive from the name of the Nuragic population of the Iliensi, who lived in the area and periodically gathered at the base of the rocky peak. Indeed, the mountain is clearly visible from all the Nuragic centers in the area, notable examples being: the Nuraghe Orruinas in Arzana, the Nuraghe Serbissi in Osini, the Nuraghe Ardasai in Seui, the s'Arcu e is Forros in Villagrande Strisaili, and the Nuraghe s'Ulimu in Ulassai. Other theories suggest the name derives from the physical characteristics of the rock material (i.e., smooth or polished) or from the strawberry tree (in Sardinian olione), which once covered its slopes.

=== Territory ===
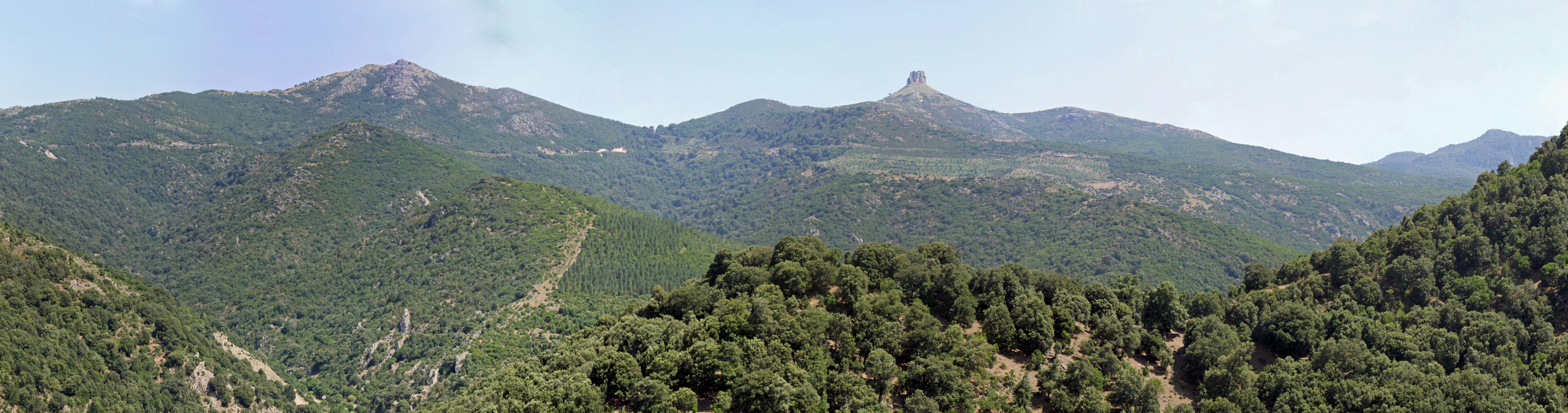
Panorama

Monte Perda Liana, like all other calcareous tacchi in the area, is the result of prolonged erosive processes carried out by atmospheric agents. The base is characterized by a truncated cone shape, upon which rises a dolomitic tower that reaches 1,293 meters above sea level. The vertical rocky walls of the latter rise for about 50 meters, and the diameter measures approximately one hundred meters.

The calcareous tower dates back to the Jurassic (130–150 million years ago) and was formed through a long process of sedimentation in a submarine environment. The current forms were shaped over the geological eras through water erosion. The terminal structure of the dolomitic tower rests on a truncated conical base of sandstone nature from the Mesozoic era. The most significant stratigraphic development is found in the section at the base of the truncated conical block of the *tacco*, formed by schists dating back to the Paleozoic (360–500 million years ago).

The walls of the calcareous tower are deeply fractured in a vertical direction. The fractures form large prismatic-section blocks.

=== Climate ===
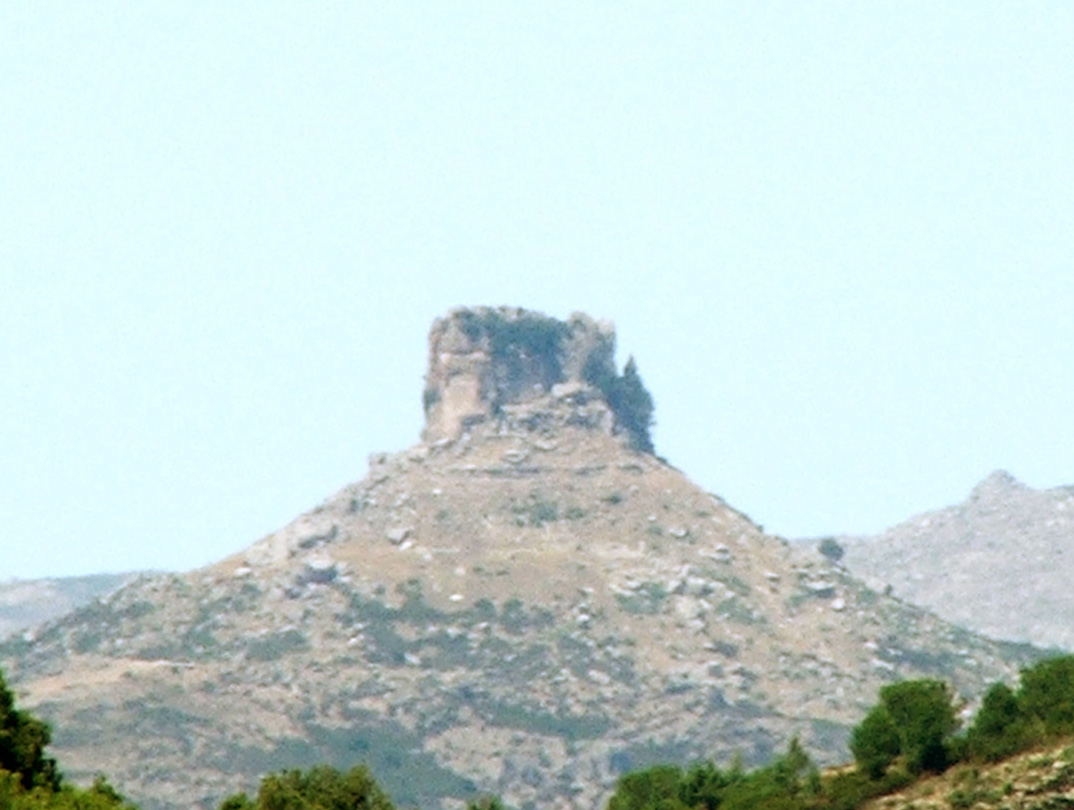
Monte Perda Liana seen from Monte Tricoli.

The climate characterizing the Monte Perda Liana area is of the Mediterranean type, with cold winters and hot, dry summers. Precipitation is mainly concentrated in the winter and autumn months, with an average of around 1,000 millimeters per year.

=== Flora and fauna ===
The dominant species of the flora is the cistus, but it is also possible to observe the presence of aromatic herbs, such as thyme (Thymus herba-barona), and shrubs typical of the maquis shrubland, such as the strawberry tree (Arbutus unedo) and heather (Erica arborea). Among the tree species are the Montpellier maple (Acer monspessulanum) and the holm oak (Quercus ilex). Other characteristic plant species include Forsyth’s bellflower (Campanula forsythii), Corsican hyssop (Micromeria filiformis), early purple orchid (Orchis mascula), Moris’ ophrys (Ophrys exaltata morisii), alpine buckthorn (Rhamnus alpina), Sardinian-Corsican saxifrage (Saxifraga cervicornis), and common whitebeam (Sorbus aria).

Among the fauna species, common ones include the mouflon (Ovis musimon), golden eagle (Aquila chrysaetos), Sardinian wildcat (Felis lybica sarda), Bonelli’s eagle (Hieraaetus fasciatus), peregrine falcon (Falco peregrinus), common buzzard (Buteo buteo), sparrowhawk (Accipiter nisus), goshawk (Accipiter gentilis), red kite (Milvus milvus), griffon vulture (Gyps fulvus), cinereous vulture (Aegypius monachus), bearded vulture (Gypaetus barbatus), and dormouse (Glis glis).

== Mountaineering and hiking ==
The summit can be reached with an alpinistic climb (eastern face) with a maximum difficulty of third grade. Climbing requires adequate skills and equipment. Due to the fragility of the rock, it is preferable to avoid installing fixed climbing anchors.

It is also possible to follow numerous hiking trails, equipped with a trail signage system, that wind around the mountain.

== See also ==
- Geography of Sardinia
- Province of Nuoro

== Bibliography ==
- Camarda, Ignazio, ed. (1993). Montagne di Sardegna [Mountains of Sardinia] (in Italian). Sassari: Carlo Delfino. ISBN 88-7138-072-X.
- Barrocu, Giovanni; Gentileschi, Maria Luisa, eds. (1996). Monumenti naturali della Sardegna [Natural Monuments of Sardinia] (in Italian). Sassari: Carlo Delfino. ISBN 88-7138-142-4.
