= Culurgiones =

Stuffed pasta

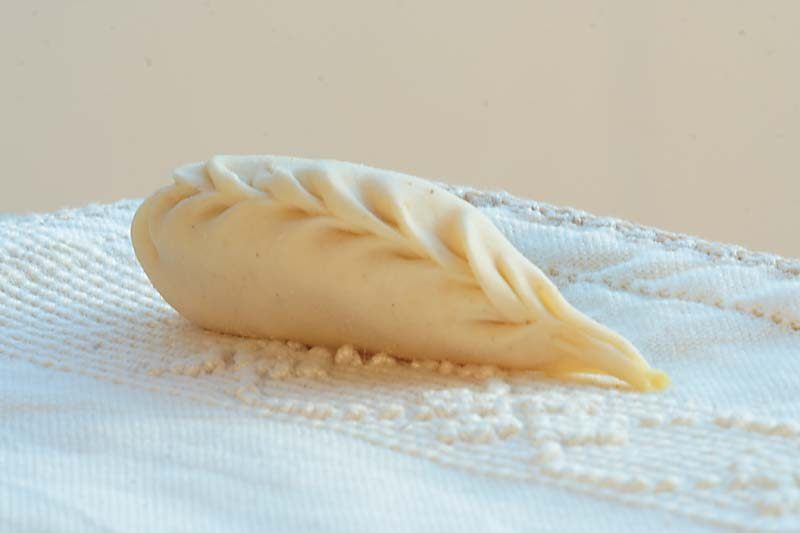
- Place of origin: Italy
- Region or state: Sardinia

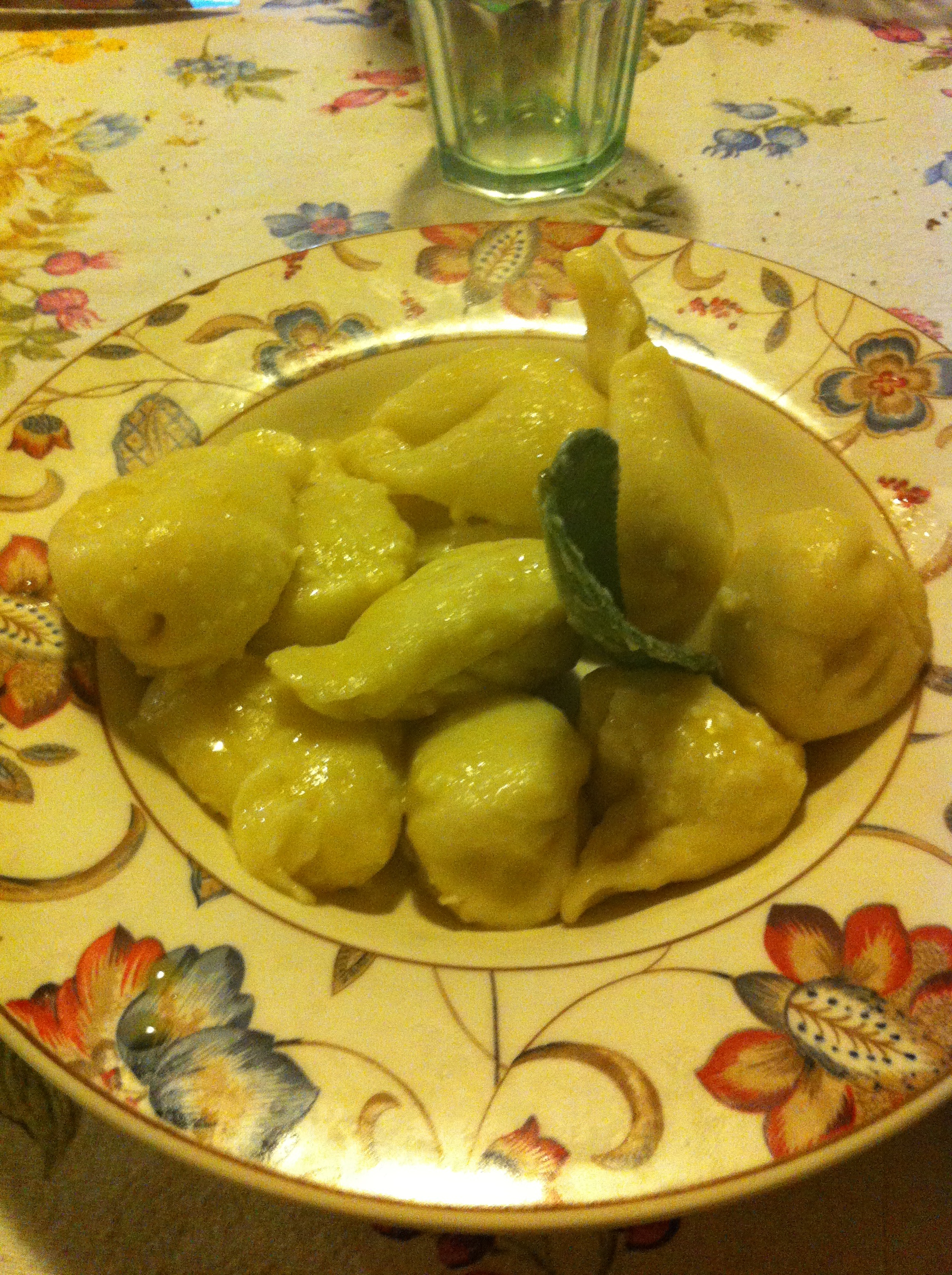
A dish of culurgiones

Culurgiones (name in Sardinian language; also called culurgionis, culurjones, culijonis, culurjonis, culunjonis, culinjonis, culurzones, or angiulotus, 'agnolotti'; Italian: culurgioni, sg.: culurgione) are a type of Sardinian ravioli-like stuffed pasta. It exists in a version made of potatoes, pecorino cheese and mint, a typical culinary specialty of the sub-region of Ogliastra, and in several other recipes adopted in the rest of the island, such as in Gallura, where the product is aromatized with lemon or orange peel.

Since 2015 the culurgionis d'Ogliastra has been recognised as a protected geographical indication (PGI) product.

== Variants ==
The dish, depending on the country of origin, is present in several variants:

- in Ogliastra and in the inland areas (including Sadali, on the border with Ogliastra) they are prepared with fresh durum wheat semolina dough and a filling of Sardinian pecorino cheese (fresh for one or two days, as in Talana, or aged in other towns), or with a filling of potatoes, garlic and mint as in Gairo, Ulassai and Bari Sardo. In the latter town, instead of pecorino, fiscidu is used, a particular sour cheese put in brine, and the culurgione is closed with the fingers so as to form a small spiga. In Jerzu, the mint is replaced by nepidedda (nepitella). The culurgione is then cooked in boiling water and seasoned with olive oil, lately with tomato sauce and grated pecorino cheese.
- spighitta closing method on both sides is a characteristic of the villages of Jerzu, Talana, Urzulei, Bari Sardo and Ilbono.
- in all the mountain areas of Ogliastra and in Bari Sardo the stuffing is strictly accompanied by garlic, while in coastal Ogliastra by sofritta onion.
- the culurzones of Barbagia di Ollolai, also imported from Ogliastra, are stuffed with fresh pecorino cheese and are served with a tomato sauce and diced pork, or alternatively with tomato sauce and fresh sausage, all topped with grated aged pecorino cheese.
- in southern Sardinia, and generally in the Campidano area, there are other recipes for culurgiones: the ravioli is prepared with fresh durum wheat semolina pasta with a filling of fresh sheep or goat ricotta cheese, egg and saffron (and the addition in some cases of Sardinian pecorino cheese, nutmeg, chard or spinach). After cooking, the culurgioni is seasoned with fresh tomato sauce, chilli pepper and basil and a sprinkling of pecorino or other grated cheese. In Teulada, on the other hand, a simpler recipe is preferred, with a filling of fresh goat cheese (sheep cheese is less frequent) in the quadrangular culurgiones (culixionis in the local dialect). The seasoning is usually tomato sauce and a sprinkling of aged goat cheese.

== Additional information ==
In the village of Ulassai, until the 1960s, the tradition was to consume culurgiones exclusively on All Souls' Day (sa di' de sos mortus).

Throughout Ogliastra and in the villages of Sadali and Esterzili of the Barbagia of Seulo, culurgiones (culurxonis, culurgionis or culingionis) are not considered just food, but may also be presented as a gift. They were prepared on special occasions such as thanksgiving at the end of the wheat harvest, to remember and honor the dead, on All Souls' Day in November, with sheep fat (culurgioni de ollu de seu), to celebrate Carnival in February, with lard (culurgioni de ollu de procu). the spighitta, the typical closure of culurgiones, represents the symbol of wheat to propitiate the new agricultural year at the end of August. According to the tradition they were also considered amulets that protected the family from mourning.

== Bibliography ==
- Cristina Ortolani (2003). L'Italia della pasta. Touring Editore. p. 131. ISBN 9788836529339.
- Mille ricette della cucina italiana. Il più grande e ricco libro illustrato dedicato alla tavola del nostro paese. Rizzoli. 2010. ISBN 9788817041669.
