= Maria Lai =

Artist from Sardinia, Italy (1919–2013)

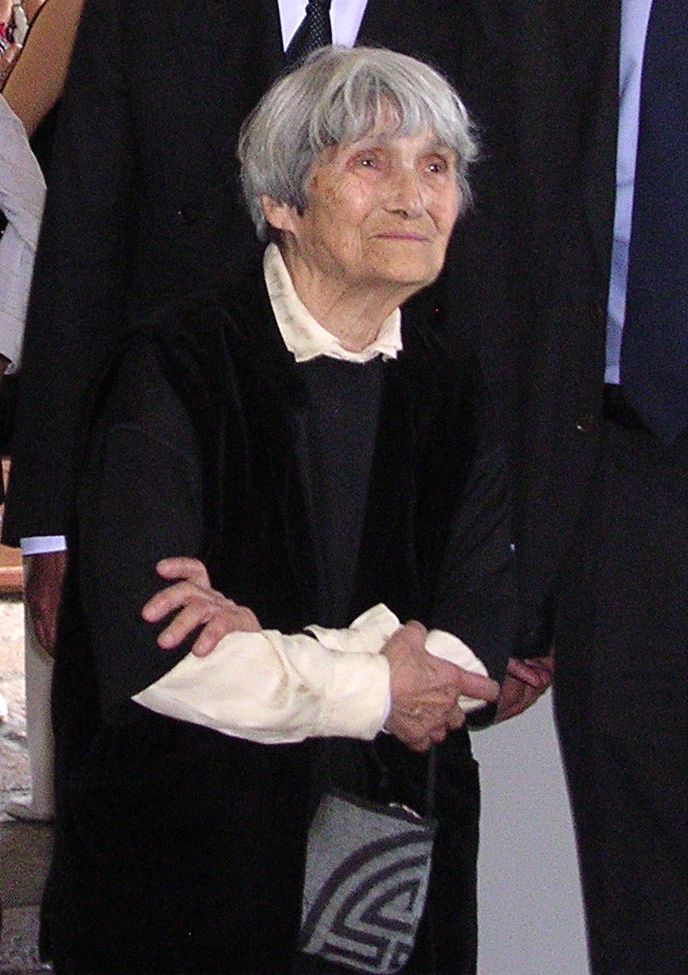
- Lai in 2012
- Born: September 27, 1919; Ulassai, Cagliari (now Nuoro), Kingdom of Italy
- Died: April 16, 2013 (aged 93); Cardedu, Ogliastra (now Nuoro), Italy
- Education: Accademia di Belle Arti di Venezia (graduated 1943)

Maria Lai (27 September 1919 – 16 April 2013) was an Italian artist from the island of Sardinia.

== Early life and education ==
She was born in Ulassai, Nuoro, Sardinia, on 27 September 1919. She studied at the Accademia di Belle Arti di Venezia under Arturo Martini, graduating in 1943.

== Artistic career ==
The M77 gallery in Milan describes her work thus:

[O]ne of the most significant artists on the Italian art scene in the postwar period. An eclectic artist, Maria Lai gave voice to her artistic vein through weaving, embroidery, writing, sculpture, and drawing.

In 1981 Lai created the event Legarsi alla montagna (Bound to the Mountain) in Ulassai, over three days. Blue ribbons totalling 27 km (17 mi) linked the houses in the village to each other and to the summit of Mount Gedili which overlooks the village. Residents connected their houses to their neighbours', sometimes with a bow or a loaf of bread to signify particular friendship, or tied taut to represent tensions between households. The project was recorded in a documentary named Maria Lai legare e collegare (Tie and connect). The use of blue ribbon alludes to a local tale of a child whose life was saved when she ran out of a cave to chase a floating blue ribbon just before the cave collapsed in a landslip. This was followed by various other installations in different towns, and a series of artworks in Ulassai which remain and form an open air art exhibition throughout the town.

Lai's work has been exhibited in group exhibitions from 1943 onwards and in solo and two-person shows from 1953, in many venues in Italy but including exhibitions in Stockholm, Sweden in 1958, Sydney, Australia in 1983, three university libraries in Germany in 1989 and Maria Lai incontra la Biblioteca Apostolica Vaticana at the Vatican Library in 2022. Her work is held in 14 public collections in Italy and in the Centre Pompidou in Paris. One year after her death an exhibition of her work called Maria Lai. Ricucire il mondo (Sewing the World) was held in three Sardinian venues: Cagliari, Nuoro and Ulassai. A major retrospective exhibition of her work was held in the MAXXI (National Museum of 21st-century arts) in Rome in 2019, to mark the centenary of her birth. The exhibition was titled Tenendo per mano il sole (Holding the Sun by the Hand), which was the title of a "sewn fable" she had created in 1984. Maria Lai. A Journey to America (15 November 2024 – 21 July 2025) was Lai's first North American museum show and was held at Magazzino Italian Art in Cold Spring, N.Y.

140 of Lai's works are displayed in the former railway station of Ulassai, a contemporary art museum named "Stazione dell'Arte", which Lai established in 2006.

Christie's have sold several of Lai's works: as examples, her 1979 Autobiografia 118, of "thread, wood and canvas laid down on cardboard" and measuring 22 cm × 15 cm (8.7 in × 5.9 in) was sold in 2021 for 18,750 Euros, and her 1989 Lenzuolo (Bed Sheet), of "thread and fabric laid down on fabric" and 56 in × 91 in (140 cm × 230 cm) sold in 2018 for £150,000 after a pre-sale estimate of £20,000-£30,000.

== Recognition ==
In 2004, Lai was awarded an Honorary Degree in Literature by the University of Cagliari.

== Death ==
Maria Lai died on 16 April 2013 in Cardedu, Province of Nuoro, where she had lived since the 2000s. She is buried in the cemetery of Ulassai.

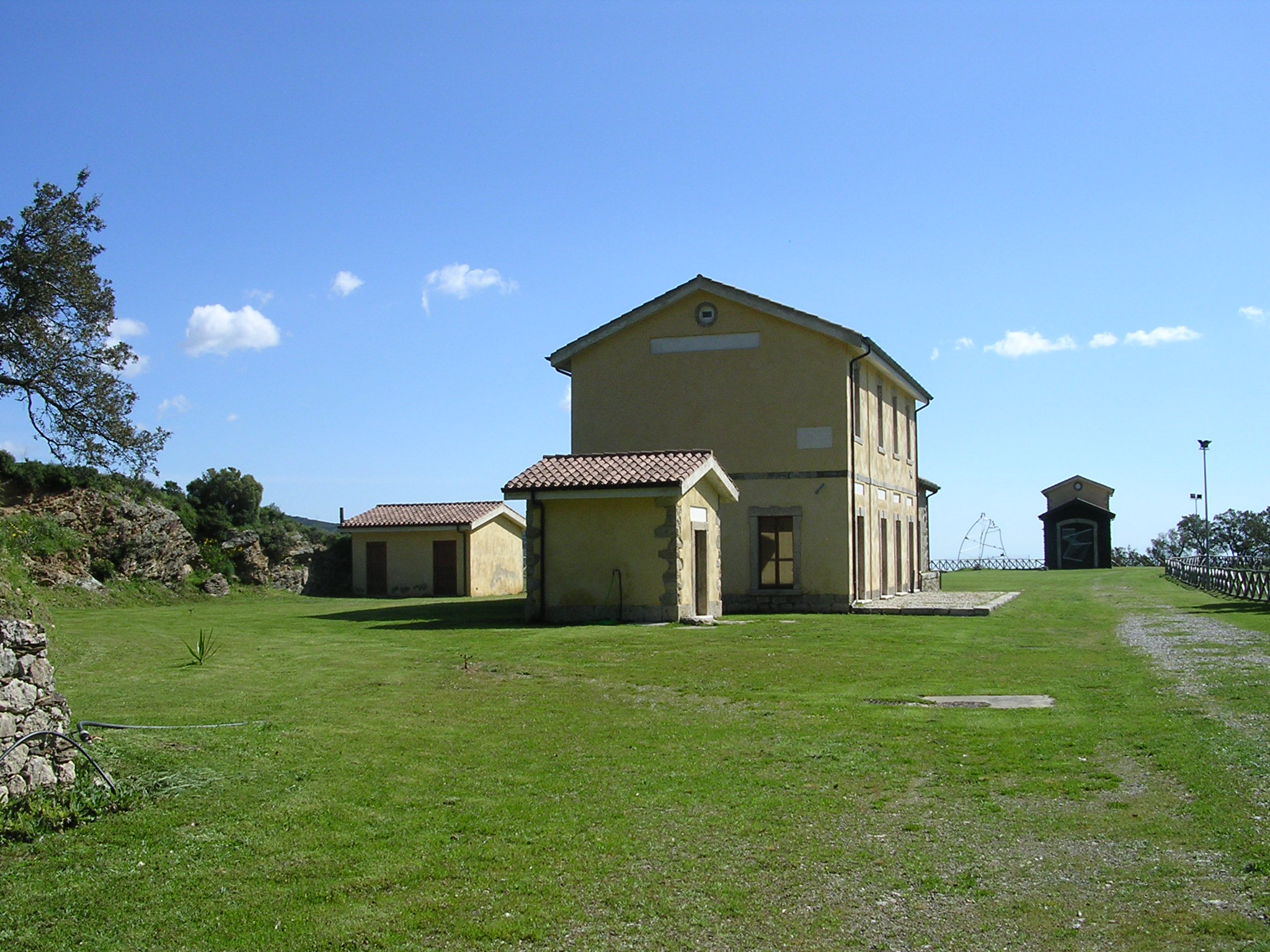
The Stazione dell'Arte in 2012
