= Perdasdefogu =

Perdasdefogu Foghesu (Sardinian)
- Comune
- Comune di Perdasdefogu
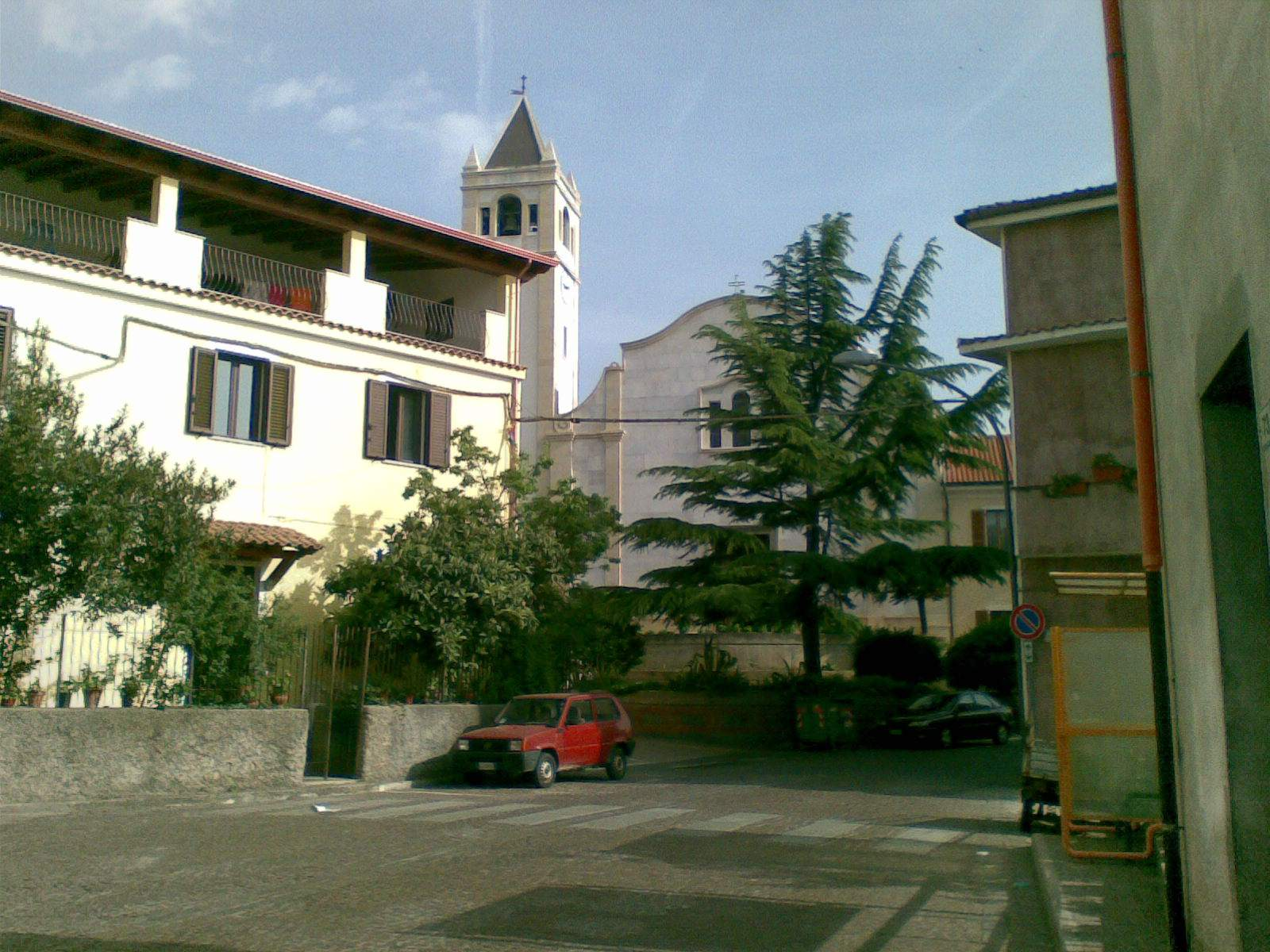
- The main street and the church of Perdasdefogu

- Coat of arms

- Location within Sardinia
- Coordinates: 39°41′N 9°26′E
- Country: Italy
- Region: Sardinia
- Province: Ogliastra

Government
  - Mayor: Bruno Chillotti

Area
  - Total: 77.75 km^{2} (30.02 sq mi)
- Elevation: 600 m (2,000 ft)

Population (2026)
  - Total: 1,689
  - Density: 21.72/km^{2} (56.26/sq mi)
- Demonym(s): Foghesi, Foghesini
- Time zone: UTC+1 (CET)
  - Summer (DST): UTC+2 (CEST)
- Postal code: 08046
- Dialing code: 0782
- Website: Official website

Perdasdefogu (Sardinian: [ˌpɛɾdazdeˈvoɣu], Italian: [perdazdeˈfɔːɡu]; lit. 'Stones of/for Fire'; locally also Foghesu [foˈɣezu]) is a town and comune (municipality) in the Province of Ogliastra in the autonomous island region of Sardinia in Italy, located about 60 kilometres (37 mi) northeast of Cagliari and about 35 kilometres (22 mi) southwest of Tortolì. It has 1,689 inhabitants.

Perdasdefogu borders the municipalities of Escalaplano, Jerzu, Ulassai, and Tertenia.

Close to Perdasdefogu is the Salto di Quirra rocket launch site.

== History ==
The area was already inhabited in pre-nuragic and nuragic times as evidenced by the presence in the territory of some nuraghes, and various archaeological evidence.

In the Middle Ages it belonged to the Judicate of Cagliari and was part of the curatoria of Sarrabus. At the fall of the giudicato (1258) it passed under the Pisan dominion and subsequently (1323) under the Aragonese dominion. In 1363 the king of Aragon Pietro IV the Ceremonious incorporated the country in the county of Quirra, given in feud to Berengario Carroz. In 1603 the county was transformed in marquisate, as a feud first of the Centelles and then of the Osorio de la Cueva, to which it was redeemed in 1839 with the suppression of the feudal system.

== Demographics ==
As of 2026, the population is 1,689, of which 51.2% are male, and 48.8% are female. Minors make up 10.3% of the population, and seniors make up 30.8%.

Historical population

| Year | Pop. | ±% |
|---|---|---|
| 1861 | 645 | — |
| 1871 | 685 | +6.2% |
| 1881 | 748 | +9.2% |
| 1901 | 1,001 | +33.8% |
| 1911 | 1,160 | +15.9% |
| 1921 | 1,134 | −2.2% |
| 1931 | 1,294 | +14.1% |
| 1936 | 1,375 | +6.3% |

| Year | Pop. | ±% |
|---|---|---|
| 1951 | 1,742 | +26.7% |
| 1961 | 2,260 | +29.7% |
| 1971 | 2,859 | +26.5% |
| 1981 | 2,770 | −3.1% |
| 1991 | 2,544 | −8.2% |
| 2001 | 2,331 | −8.4% |
| 2011 | 2,042 | −12.4% |
| 2021 | 1,763 | −13.7% |

Source: ISTAT

=== Longevity ===
The town, together with those of Arzana and Villagrande Strisaili in the Ogliastra area, boasts numerous cases of longevity among its inhabitants, with a high number of over-90s. Emblematic is the fact that the longest-lived family in the world comes from this town: the head of the family Consola Melis in 2014 reached 107 years followed by 8 brothers over 90 and over 80 for a total of 828 years; also, her sister Claudia turned 101 in 2014.

=== Immigration ===
As of 2025, immigrants make up 4.6% of the total population. The 5 largest foreign countries of birth are Germany, France, Romania, Switzerland, and Ukraine.

== See also ==
- Space Propulsion Test Facility in Perdasdefogu
- Sardinia
