= Barbagia of Seulo =

Historical subregion of Barbagia

Coordinates: 39°52′N 9°14′E

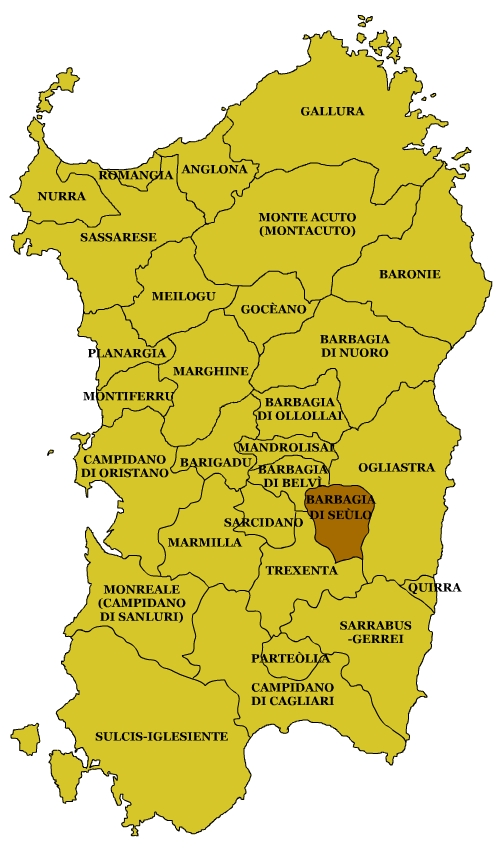
Location of the Barbagia of Seulo in Sardinia.

The Barbagia of Seulo is a historical subregion of Barbagia, in central-eastern Sardinia, Italy. It includes the communes of Seulo, Seui, Sadali, Esterzili and Ussassai.
