= Nuraghe Serbissi =

10th-18th Century Italian nuragic complex

Coordinates: 39.0954°N 9.0051°E

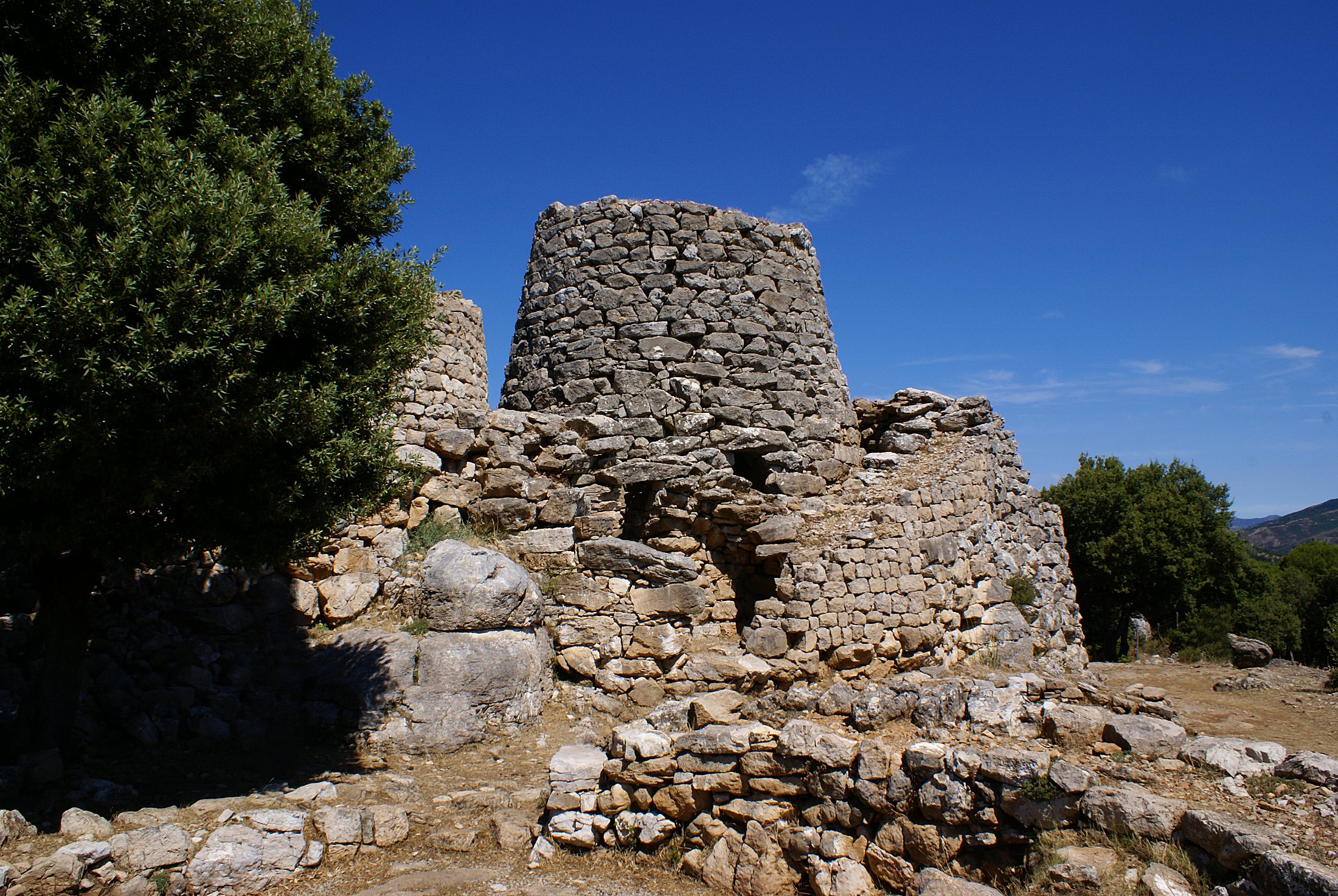
- Nuraghe Serbissi
- Interactive map of Nuraghe Serbissi
- Type: Settlement
- Periods: Bronze Age
- Cultures: Nuragic civilization
- Location: Osini, Sardinia, Italy

The nuraghe Serbissi is a nuragic complex dating back to 18th-10th century BC.

The site is located on a limestone plateau between the towns of Osini and Gairo. The nuragic complex, built over a cave with two entrances, consists of a central tower of 6.3m high flanked by three smaller towers, around which are placed 8 circular huts. Access to the towers is through a small courtyard.

The complex was used from the Early Bronze Age to the Late Bronze Age.
