= Ussassai =

Ussassai Ussassa (Sardinian)
- Comune
- Comune di Ussassai
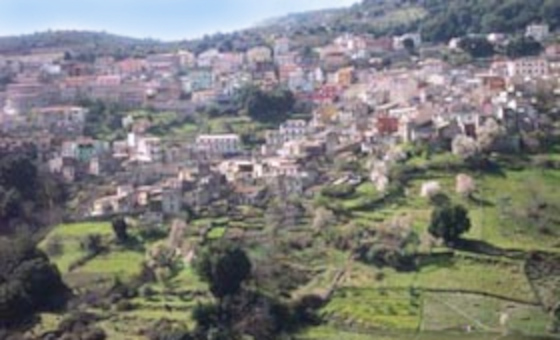
- View of Ussassai

- Location within Sardinia
- Coordinates: 39°49′N 9°24′E
- Country: Italy
- Region: Sardinia
- Province: Ogliastra

Area
  - Total: 47.32 km^{2} (18.27 sq mi)
- Elevation: 670 m (2,200 ft)

Population (2026)
  - Total: 432
  - Density: 9.13/km^{2} (23.6/sq mi)
- Demonym: Ussassesi
- Time zone: UTC+1 (CET)
  - Summer (DST): UTC+2 (CEST)
- Postal code: 08040
- Dialing code: 0782

Ussassai (Sardinian: Ussassa) is a village and comune (municipality) in the Province of Ogliastra in the autonomous island region of Sardinia in Italy, located about 70 kilometres (43 mi) northeast of Cagliari and about 25 kilometres (16 mi) southwest of Tortolì. It has 432 inhabitants.

Ussassai borders the municipalities of Gairo, Osini, Seui, and Ulassai.

== Demographics ==
As of 2026, the population is 432, of which 51.6% are male, and 48.4% are female. Minors make up 7.2% of the population, and seniors make up 41.9%.

Historical population

Year	Pop.	±%
1861	544	—
1871	574	+5.5%
1881	642	+11.8%
1901	797	+24.1%
1911	807	+1.3%
1921	867	+7.4%
1931	985	+13.6%
1936	979	−0.6%

Year	Pop.	±%
1951	1,110	+13.4%
1961	1,261	+13.6%
1971	1,168	−7.4%
1981	1,084	−7.2%
1991	873	−19.5%
2001	763	−12.6%
2011	599	−21.5%
2021	473	−21.0%

Source: ISTAT

=== Immigration ===
As of 2025, immigrants make up 4.8% of the total population. The 5 largest foreign countries of birth are Germany, Argentina, Romania, Belgium, and France.
