= Tertenia =

- Comune
- Comune di Tertenia
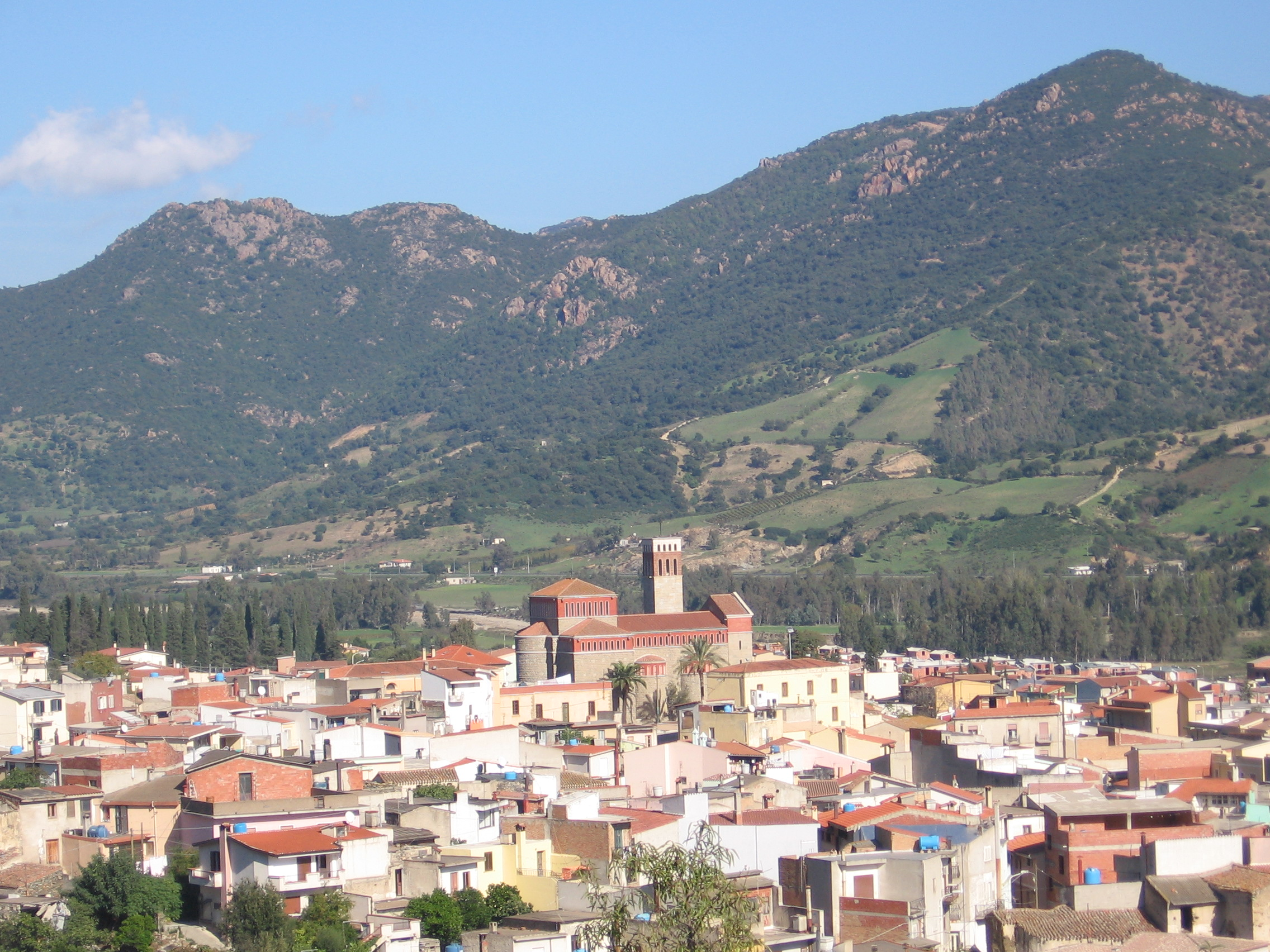
- View of Tertenia

- Coat of arms

- Location within Sardinia
- Coordinates: 39°42′N 9°35′E
- Country: Italy
- Region: Sardinia
- Province: Ogliastra
- Frazioni: Abb'Eranu, Abba Urci, Barisoni, Dispensa, Foxi Lioni, Foxi Murdegu, Is Erriolus, Marosini, Palu e Cerbus, Peddari-Sa Mandra-Su Muscadeddu, Presentau, San Piettro, Tesonis, Torre San Giovanni, Zinnibiri Mannu

Government
  - Mayor: Giulio Murgia

Area
  - Total: 117.65 km^{2} (45.42 sq mi)
- Elevation: 129 m (423 ft)

Population (2026)
  - Total: 3,834
  - Density: 32.59/km^{2} (84.40/sq mi)
- Demonym: Terteniesi
- Time zone: UTC+1 (CET)
  - Summer (DST): UTC+2 (CEST)
- Postal code: 08047
- Dialing code: 0782
- Patron saint: St. Sebastian
- Saint day: January 20

Tertenia is a town and comune (municipality) in the Province of Ogliastra in the autonomous island region of Sardinia in Italy, located about 100 kilometres (62 mi) northeast of Cagliari and about 25 kilometres (16 mi) south of Tortolì. It has 3,834 inhabitants.

Tertenia borders the municipalities of Cardedu, Gairo, Jerzu, Lanusei, Loceri, Osini, and Ulassai.

It is located in a high valley at the base of Mt. Arbu and Mt. Ferru, along the Rio Quirra river.

== Demographics ==
As of 2026, the population is 3,834, of which 49.8% are male, and 50.2% are female. Minors make up 14.3% of the population, and seniors make up 27.6%.

Historical population

Year	Pop.	±%
1861	1,221	—
1871	1,295	+6.1%
1881	1,321	+2.0%
1901	1,838	+39.1%
1911	2,027	+10.3%
1921	2,017	−0.5%
1931	2,267	+12.4%
1936	2,379	+4.9%

Year	Pop.	±%
1951	3,153	+32.5%
1961	3,657	+16.0%
1971	3,436	−6.0%
1981	3,670	+6.8%
1991	3,735	+1.8%
2001	3,726	−0.2%
2011	3,815	+2.4%
2021	3,855	+1.0%

Source: ISTAT

=== Immigration ===
As of 2025, immigrants make up 3.8% of the total population. The 5 largest foreign countries of birth are France, Germany, Argentina, Romania, and the United Kingdom.
