= Seui =

- Comune
- Comune di Seui
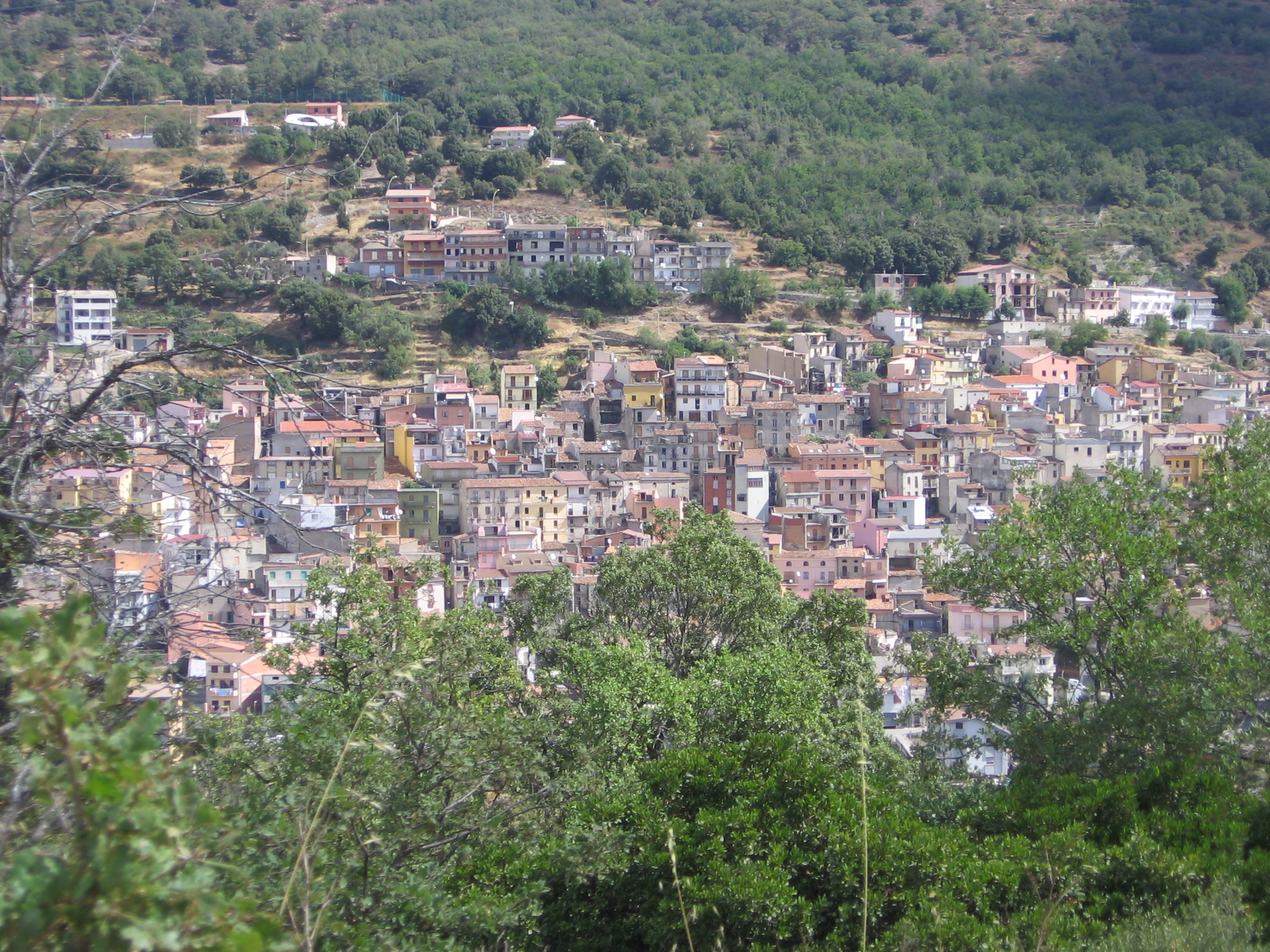
- View of Seui

- Location within Sardinia
- Coordinates: 39°50′N 9°19′E
- Country: Italy
- Region: Sardinia
- Province: Ogliastra

Area
  - Total: 148.21 km^{2} (57.22 sq mi)

Population (2026)
  - Total: 1,137
  - Density: 7.672/km^{2} (19.87/sq mi)
- Demonym: Seuesi
- Time zone: UTC+1 (CET)
  - Summer (DST): UTC+2 (CEST)
- Postal code: 08037
- Dialing code: 0782

Seui (Sardinian and Italian: [seˈui]) is a town and comune (municipality) in the Province of Ogliastra in the autonomous island region of Sardinia in Italy, located about 70 kilometres (43 mi) north of Cagliari and about 30 kilometres (19 mi) southwest of Tortolì. It has 1,137 inhabitants.

Seui borders the municipalities of Arzana, Escalaplano, Esterzili, Gairo, Perdasdefogu, Sadali, Seulo, Ulassai, and Ussassai.

== Demographics ==
As of 2026, the population is 1,137, of which 51.6% are male, and 48.4% are female. Minors make up 10.6% of the population, and seniors make up 31.4%.

Historical population

Year	Pop.	±%
1861	1,965	—
1871	2,042	+3.9%
1881	2,157	+5.6%
1901	2,744	+27.2%
1911	2,995	+9.1%
1921	3,277	+9.4%
1931	3,335	+1.8%
1936	3,119	−6.5%

Year	Pop.	±%
1951	3,112	−0.2%
1961	3,166	+1.7%
1971	2,624	−17.1%
1981	2,178	−17.0%
1991	1,805	−17.1%
2001	1,587	−12.1%
2011	1,361	−14.2%
2021	1,178	−13.4%

Source: ISTAT

=== Immigration ===
As of 2025, immigrants make up 4.5% of the total population. The 5 largest foreign countries of birth are Argentina, Germany, France, Belgium, and Switzerland.
