= Arzana =

Arzana Àrtzana (Sardinian)
- Comune
- Comune di Arzana
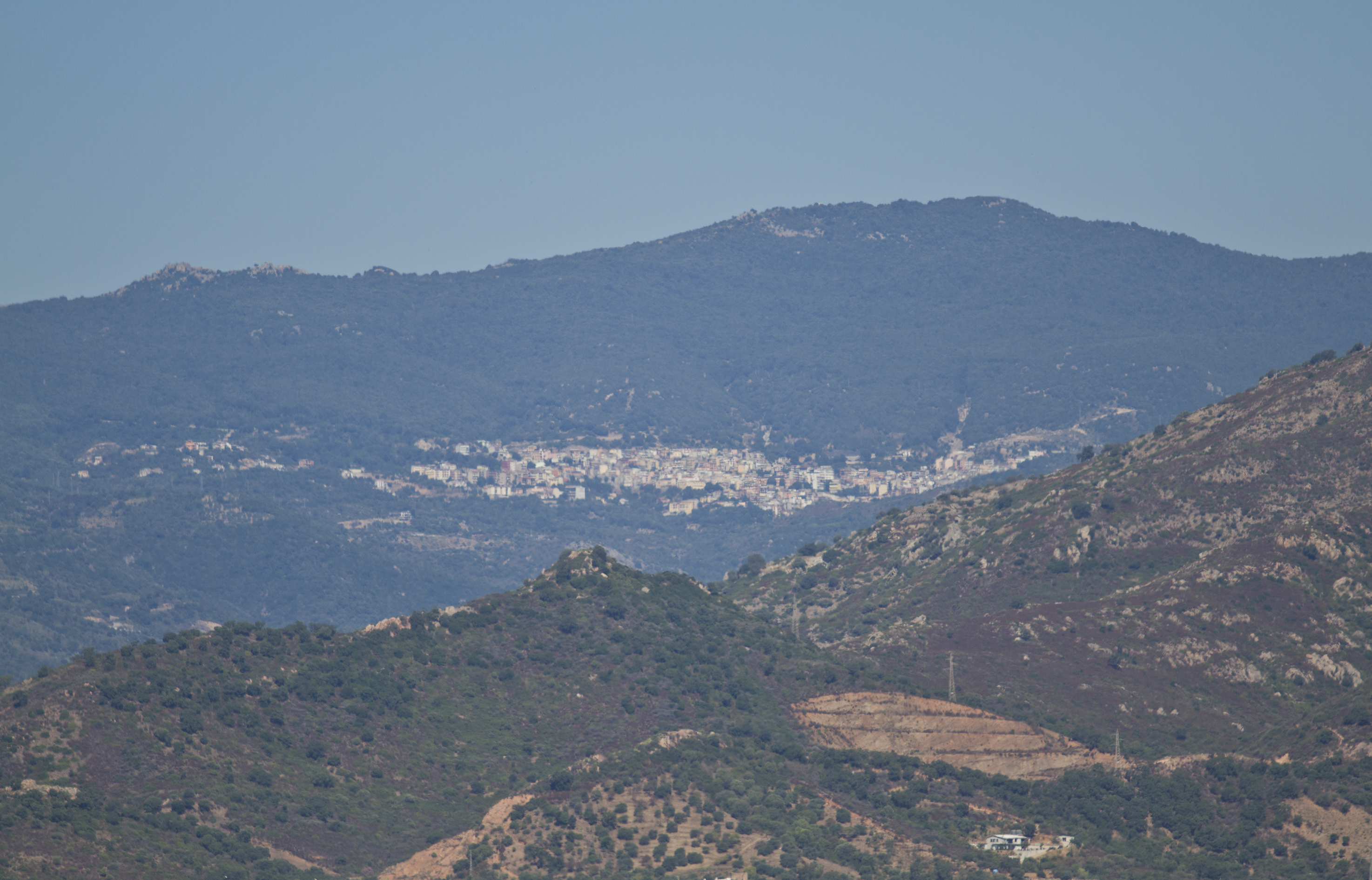
- View of Arzana

- Location of Arzana in Sardinia
- Coordinates: 39°55′N 9°32′E
- Country: Italy
- Region: Sardinia
- Province: Ogliastra

Government
  - Mayor: Angelo Ivano Stochino

Area
  - Total: 162.49 km^{2} (62.74 sq mi)

Population (2026)
  - Total: 2,199
  - Density: 13.53/km^{2} (35.05/sq mi)
- Demonym: Arzanesi
- Time zone: UTC+1 (CET)
  - Summer (DST): UTC+2 (CEST)
- Postal code: 08040
- Dialing code: 0782
- Website: Official website

Arzana (Italian: [ˈartsana]; Sardinian: Àrtzana, Àrthana) is a town and comune (municipality) in the Province of Ogliastra in the autonomous island region of Sardinia in Italy, located about 90 kilometres (56 mi) northeast of Cagliari and about 10 kilometres (6 mi) west of Tortolì. It has 2,199 inhabitants.

Arzana borders the municipalities of Aritzo, Desulo, Elini, Gairo, Ilbono, Jerzu, Lanusei, Seui, Seulo, Tortolì, Villagrande Strisaili, and Villaputzu. Arzana is located about 670 metres (2,200 ft) above sea level.

== Demographics ==
As of 2026, the population is 2,199, of which 50.2% are male, and 49.8% are female. Minors make up 14.1% of the population, and seniors make up 26.9%.

Historical population

Year	Pop.	±%
1861	1,589	—
1871	1,754	+10.4%
1881	1,781	+1.5%
1901	2,106	+18.2%
1911	2,477	+17.6%
1921	2,520	+1.7%
1931	2,631	+4.4%
1936	2,701	+2.7%

Year	Pop.	±%
1951	2,960	+9.6%
1961	3,443	+16.3%
1971	3,190	−7.3%
1981	3,292	+3.2%
1991	2,940	−10.7%
2001	2,730	−7.1%
2011	2,501	−8.4%
2021	2,259	−9.7%

Source: ISTAT

=== Immigration ===
As of 2025, immigrants make up 3.6% of the total population. The 5 largest foreign countries of birth are Germany, Argentina, Kyrgyzstan, Romania, and Belgium.

== Notable people ==
- Attilio Cubeddu, former member of Anonima sarda
