= Osini =

Osini Osìni
- Comune
- Comune di Osini
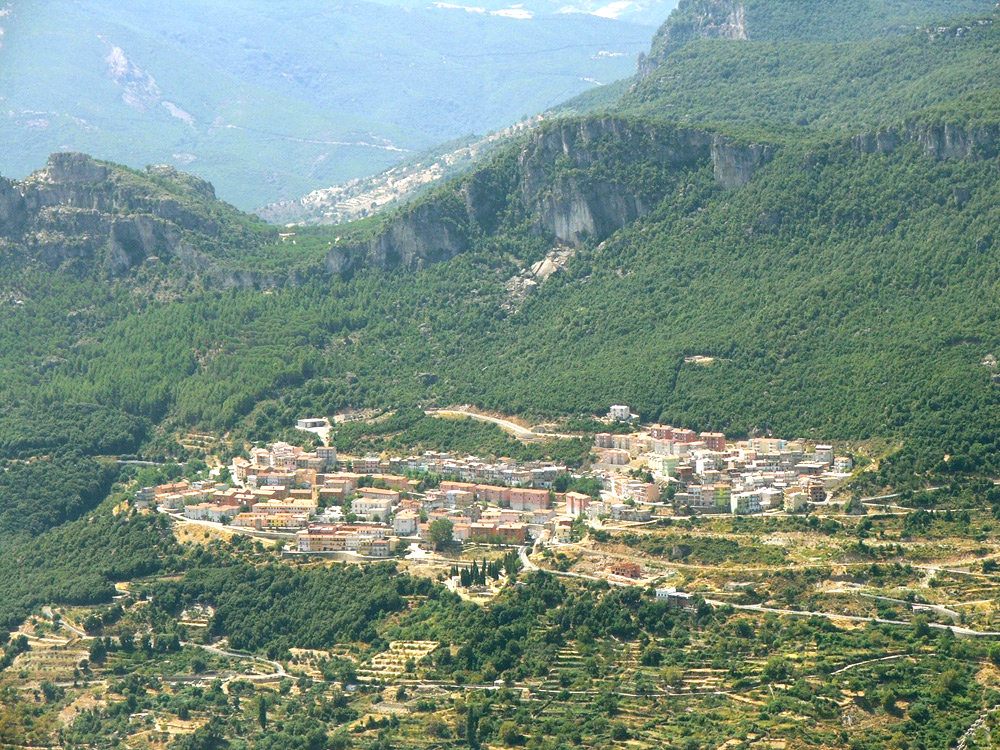
- View of Osini

- Location within Sardinia
- Coordinates: 39°49′N 9°30′E
- Country: Italy
- Region: Sardinia
- Province: Ogliastra

Area
  - Total: 39.81 km^{2} (15.37 sq mi)

Population (2026)
  - Total: 681
  - Density: 17.1/km^{2} (44.3/sq mi)
- Time zone: UTC+1 (CET)
  - Summer (DST): UTC+2 (CEST)
- Postal code: 08040
- Dialing code: 0782

Osini is a village and comune (municipality) in the Province of Ogliastra in the autonomous island region of Sardinia in Italy, located about 70 kilometres (43 mi) northeast of Cagliari and about 20 kilometres (12 mi) southwest of Tortolì. It has 681 inhabitants.

The Nuraghe Serbissi is located in Osini's municipal territory.

Osini borders the municipalities of Cardedu, Gairo, Jerzu, Lanusei, Loceri, Tertenia, Ulassai, and Ussassai.

== Demographics ==
As of 2026, the population is 681, of which 52.9% are male, and 47.1% are female. Minors make up 10.6% of the population, and seniors make up 37.6%.

Historical population

Year	Pop.	±%
1861	744	—
1871	800	+7.5%
1881	849	+6.1%
1901	1,135	+33.7%
1911	1,115	−1.8%
1921	1,218	+9.2%
1931	1,284	+5.4%
1936	1,390	+8.3%

Year	Pop.	±%
1951	1,451	+4.4%
1961	1,767	+21.8%
1971	1,493	−15.5%
1981	1,319	−11.7%
1991	1,131	−14.3%
2001	947	−16.3%
2011	811	−14.4%
2021	727	−10.4%

Source: ISTAT

=== Immigration ===
As of 2025, immigrants make up 4.8% of the total population. The 5 largest foreign countries of birth are France, Romania, Argentina, Germany, and Luxembourg.
