= Cardedu =

- Comune
- Comune di Cardedu
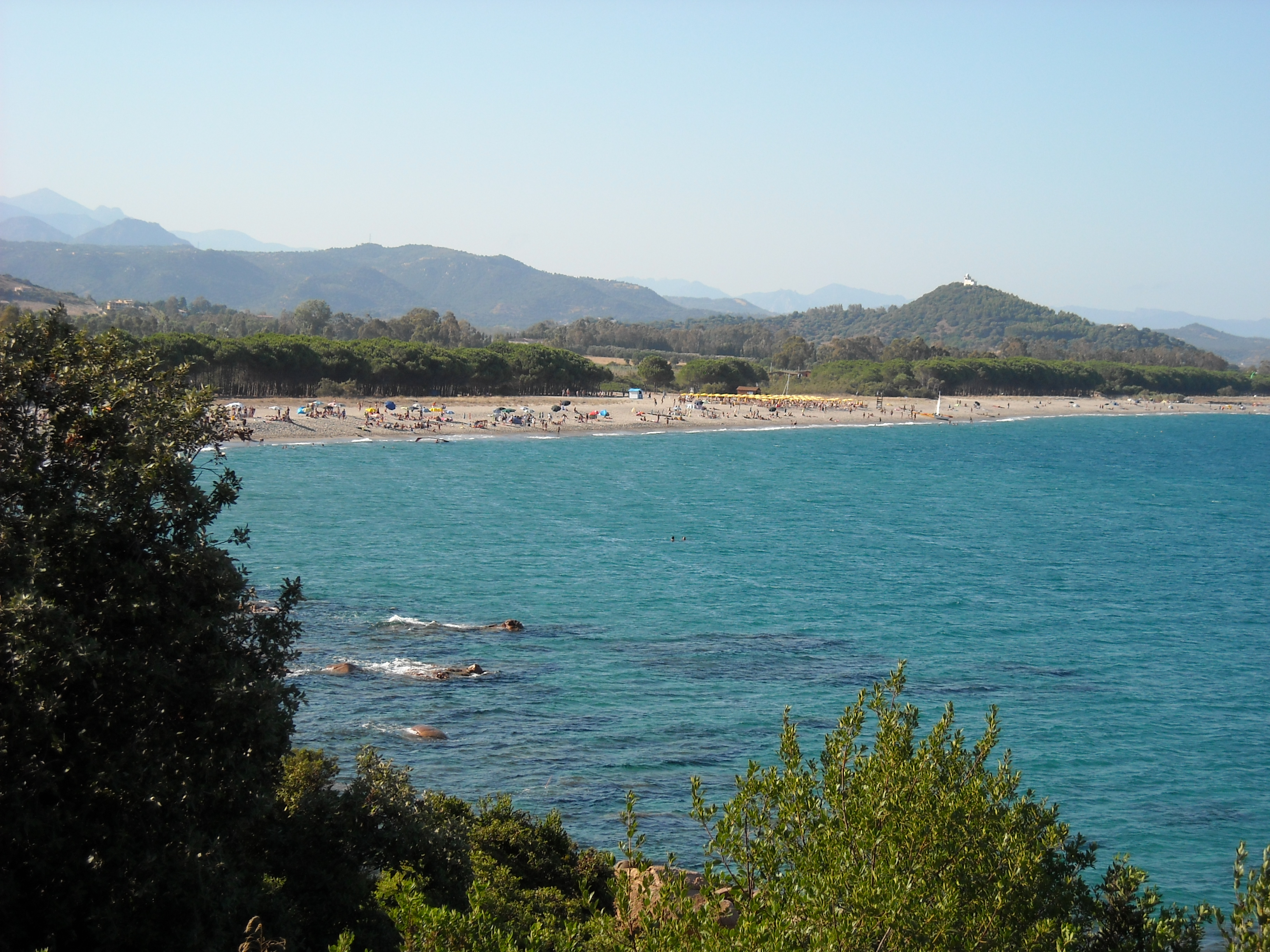
- Beach of Sa perda e pera

- Coat of arms

- Location within Sardinia
- Coordinates: 39°48′N 9°38′E
- Country: Italy
- Region: Sardinia
- Province: Ogliastra
- Frazioni: Buoncammino, C. Impero, Iscrixedda, Museddu, Perdepera, Perdu Pili, Su Scusorgiu

Government
  - Mayor: Matteo Piras

Area
  - Total: 33.39 km^{2} (12.89 sq mi)
- Elevation: 49 m (161 ft)

Population (2026)
  - Total: 2,002
  - Density: 59.96/km^{2} (155.3/sq mi)
- Demonym: Cardedesi
- Time zone: UTC+1 (CET)
  - Summer (DST): UTC+2 (CEST)
- Postal code: 08040
- Dialing code: 0782
- Website: Official website

Cardedu is a town and comune (municipality) in the Province of Ogliastra in the autonomous island region of Sardinia in Italy, located about 80 kilometres (50 mi) northeast of Cagliari and about 15 kilometres (9 mi) south of Tortolì. It has 2,002 inhabitants.

Cardedu borders the municipalities of Bari Sardo, Gairo, Jerzu, Lanusei, Osini, and Tertenia.

== Demographics ==
As of 2026, the population is 2,002, of which 48.7% are male, and 51.3% are female. Minors make up 15.9% of the population, and seniors make up 24.2%.

Historical population

| Year | Pop. | ±% |
|---|---|---|
| 1861 | 434 | — |
| 1871 | 467 | +7.6% |
| 1881 | 513 | +9.9% |
| 1901 | 653 | +27.3% |
| 1911 | 723 | +10.7% |
| 1921 | 712 | −1.5% |
| 1931 | 775 | +8.8% |
| 1936 | 803 | +3.6% |

| Year | Pop. | ±% |
|---|---|---|
| 1951 | 872 | +8.6% |
| 1961 | 967 | +10.9% |
| 1971 | 913 | −5.6% |
| 1981 | 1,000 | +9.5% |
| 1991 | 1,426 | +42.6% |
| 2001 | 1,465 | +2.7% |
| 2011 | 1,809 | +23.5% |
| 2021 | 1,927 | +6.5% |

Source: ISTAT

=== Immigration ===
As of 2025, immigrants make up 7.2% of the total population. The 5 largest foreign countries of birth are Germany, Romania, Morocco, Switzerland, and France.
