= Ulassai =

Ulassai Ulassa (Sardinian)
- Comune
- Comune di Ulassai
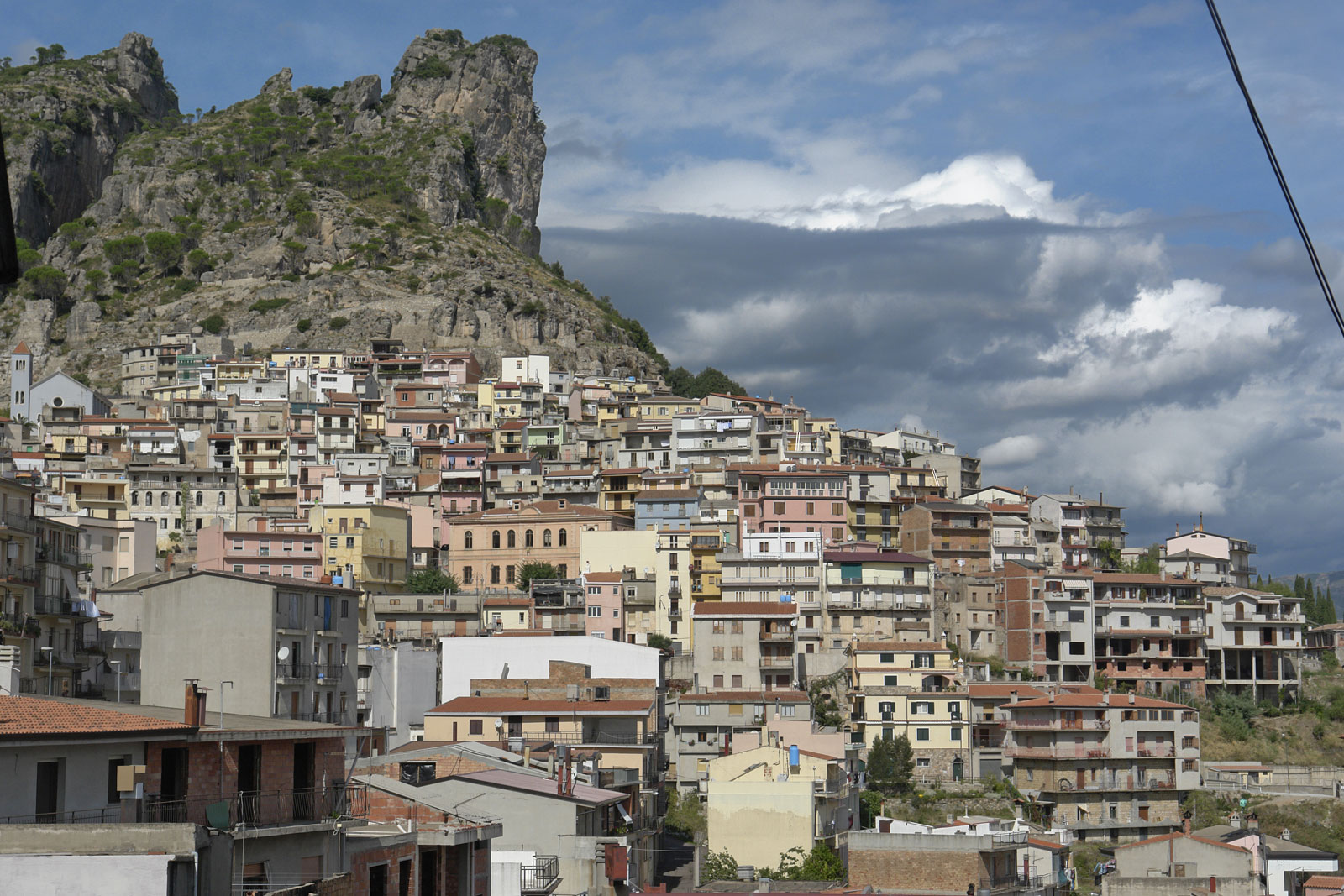
- View of Ulassai

- Location within Sardinia
- Coordinates: 39°49′N 9°30′E
- Country: Italy
- Region: Sardinia
- Province: Ogliastra

Government
  - Mayor: Giovanni Soru

Area
  - Total: 122.41 km^{2} (47.26 sq mi)
- Elevation: 775 m (2,543 ft)

Population (2026)
  - Total: 1,365
  - Density: 11.15/km^{2} (28.88/sq mi)
- Demonym: Ulassesi
- Time zone: UTC+1 (CET)
  - Summer (DST): UTC+2 (CEST)
- Postal code: 08040
- Dialing code: 0782
- Website: Official website

Ulassai (Sardinian: Ulassa) is a town and comune (municipality) in the Province of Ogliastra in the autonomous island region of Sardinia in Italy, located about 70 kilometres (43 mi) northeast of Cagliari and about 20 kilometres (12 mi) southwest of Tortolì. It has 1,365 inhabitants.

Ulassai borders the municipalities of Esterzili, Gairo, Jerzu, Osini, Perdasdefogu, Seui, Tertenia, Ussassai, and Villaputzu.

== History ==
Several Nuragic settlements still exist in the vast municipal area, some destroyed, others still in good condition, such as the nuraghes of S'Ulimu, Seddurrulu, and the giants' tombs of Bau 'e Tuvulu. The area also includes a now-destroyed Nuragic settlement called "Lessei," which was still inhabited until 1350.

The history of Ulassai, despite all the various dominations, has been that of a simple shepherd's life. Until the end of the nineteenth century, the town was not connected by any road to the outside of the Ogliastra area. Only in 1893 were connections to Cagliari achieved through the railway line.

== Geography ==
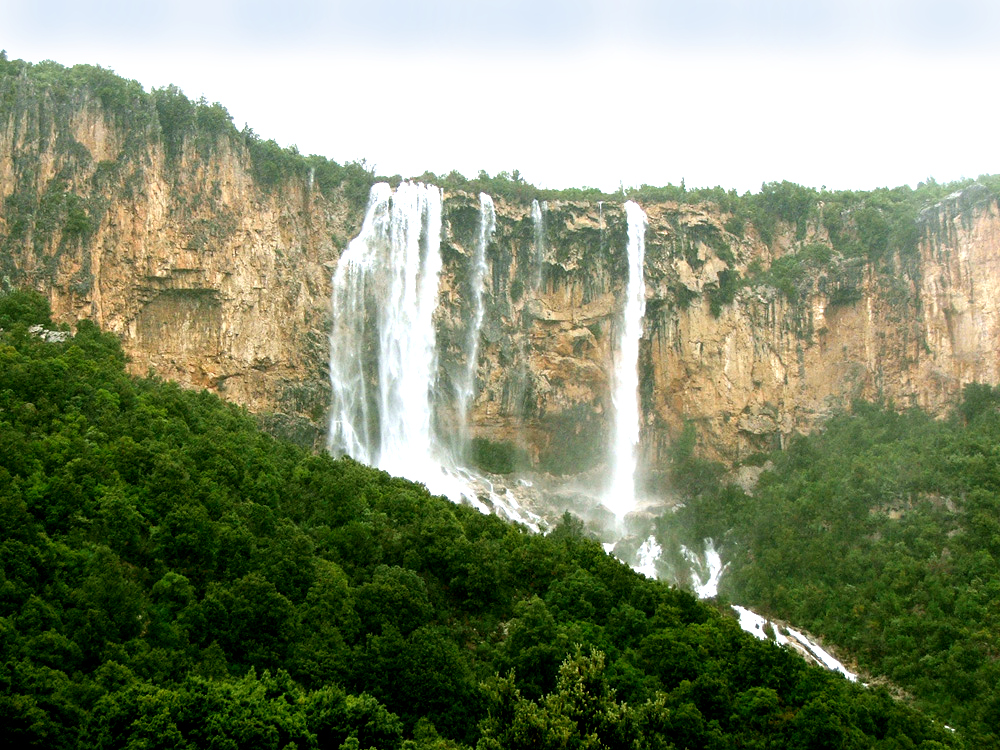
The Cascades of Lequarci

Ulassai is located in the heart of the Barbagia sub-region of Ogliastra. At 775 meters above sea level, it is the highest town in Ogliastra. Its municipal territory extends for 122 km², from the town to the border with the Barbagia di Seùlo and to the south in a small strip with the Province of Cagliari.

The historic center appears nestled between the large complex of the Ulassai Heel to the north and the imposing Mount Tisiddu to the south. On the slopes of the Ulassai Heel lies a complex system of caves, the most famous of which, the Su Marmuri Cave, with its 1,000 meters of length and its internal concretions, is the main tourist destination in the entire Pardu Valley. During periods of heavy rainfall, the impressive Lecorci Waterfalls flow from a lower slope of these caves.

== Monuments ==
=== Religious Architecture ===
- Church of San Sebastiano, dating back to the 17th century.
- Ancient Cemetery (circa 1885).
- Byzantine Complex of Santa Barbara: this country church is located about 7 km from Ulassai. Around the church is a sort of portico built in the late Roman era, "Is Cumbessias," which served as lodgings for shepherds and villagers who came to participate in the festivities that lasted about a week. In the southernmost part of the complex, the ancient walled enclosure where the saint's sheep and goats were milked still stands; it is still called "sa Corte 'e sa Santa."

=== Civil architecture ===
- Town hall of the Municipality of Ulassai
- Casa Cannas, a former mill from 1900, now home to the CaMuC Museum of Contemporary Art.
- Ancient arches by Barigau and Biddemeri.

=== Archaeological sites ===
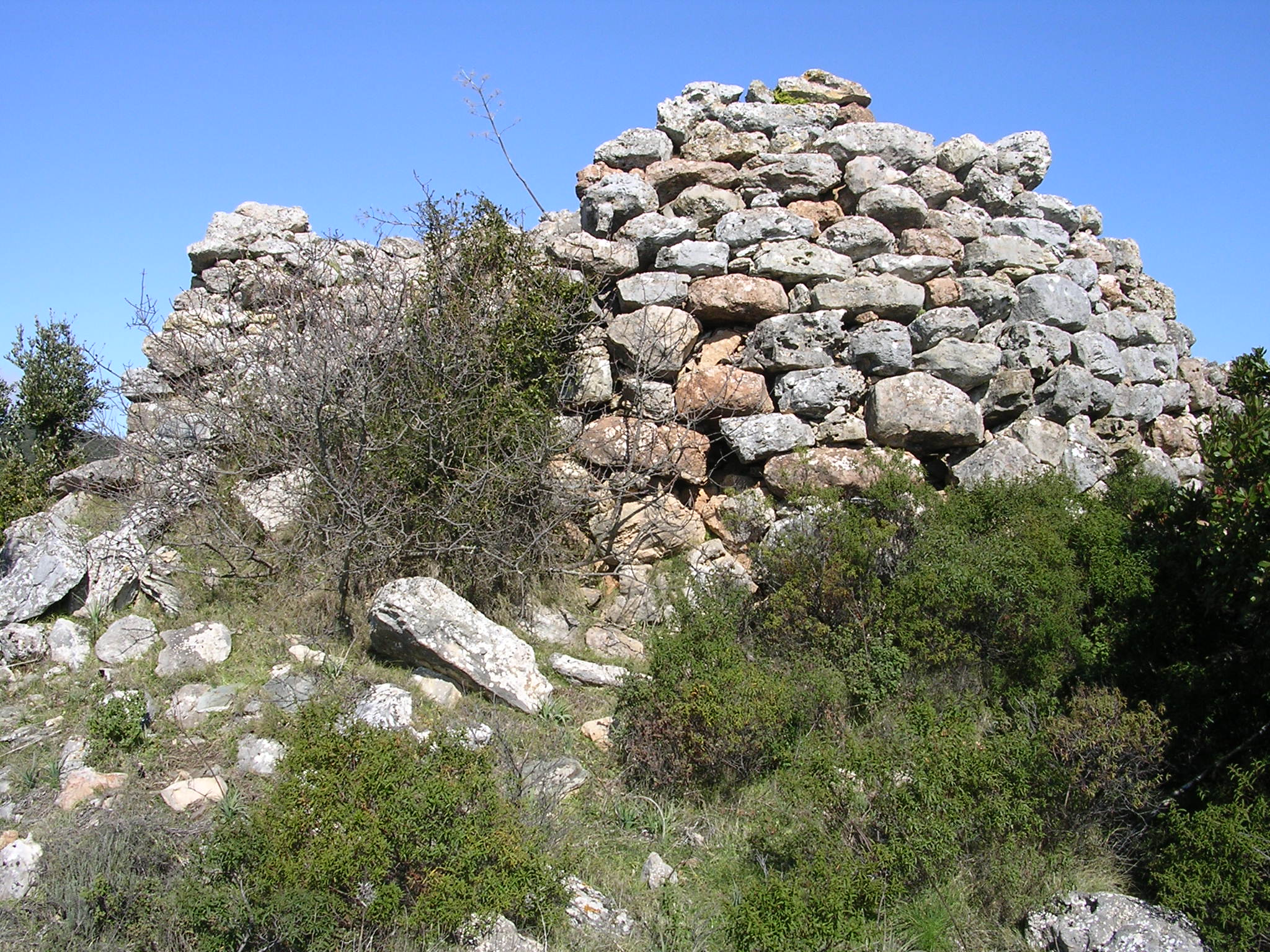
Nuraghe Pranu of Ulassai

- Nuraghe s'Ulimu
- Nuraghe Pranu
- Nuraghe Cea Arcis
- Nuraghe Crabas
- Nuragic fortress of Seroni
- Domus de Janas sa Crabiola
- Small stretch of Roman road in the Marosini area

== Demographics ==
As of 2026, the population is 1,365, of which 48.3% are male, and 51.7% are female. Minors make up 13.3% of the population, and seniors make up 31.1%.

Historical population

Year	Pop.	±%
1861	1,575	—
1871	1,591	+1.0%
1881	1,650	+3.7%
1901	2,079	+26.0%
1911	2,193	+5.5%
1921	2,220	+1.2%
1931	2,247	+1.2%
1936	2,224	−1.0%

Year	Pop.	±%
1951	2,320	+4.3%
1961	2,435	+5.0%
1971	2,193	−9.9%
1981	2,050	−6.5%
1991	1,732	−15.5%
2001	1,613	−6.9%
2011	1,517	−6.0%
2021	1,369	−9.8%

Source: ISTAT

=== Immigration ===
As of 2025, immigrants make up 2.6% of the total population. The 5 largest foreign countries of birth are France, Romania, Germany, the United Kingdom, and Kyrgyzstan.

== Culture ==
=== Education ===
The three schools in the municipality (preschool, primary school, and lower secondary school) are branches of the Jerzu Comprehensive Institute.

=== Museums ===
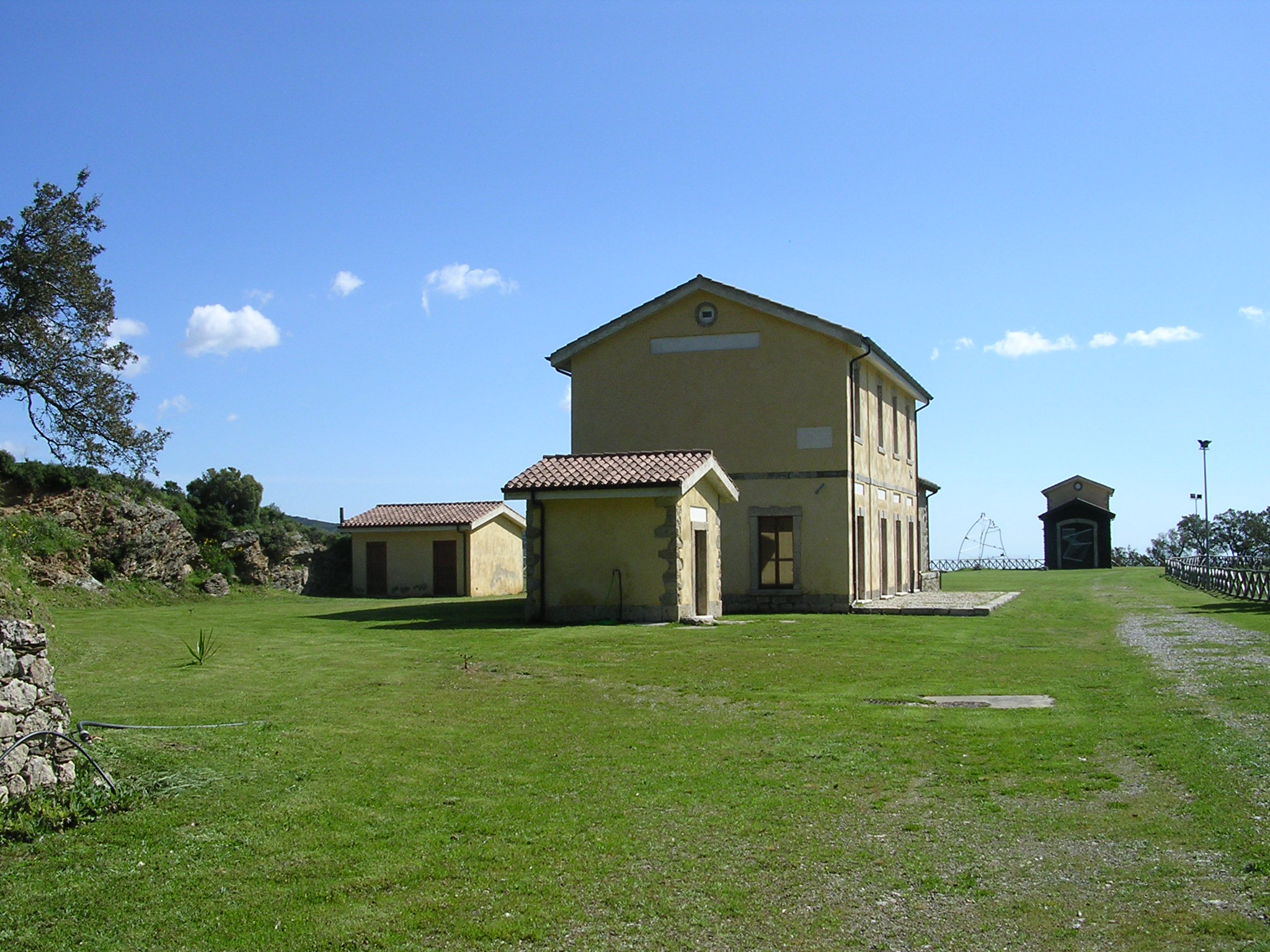
The Stazione dell'arte in 2012

- "Stazione dell'Arte": it is the former railway station of Ulassai become a contemporary art museum, established in 2006. It holds 140 of the works of Maria Lai (1919-2013), who was born in Ulassai.
- CaMuC: it is the acronym for Casa Museo Cannas. After the death of entrepreneur Massimino Cannas in 1964 and subsequently of his second wife, his heirs decided to sell the building, which was purchased in 1993 by the Municipality of Ulassai, which undertook a renovation project that was completed in 2024.

The second edition of the Ulassai Contemporary Art Biennale, dedicated to Maria Lai and titled The Meaning of the Work, will be held from late March to early June 2026.

=== Events ===
The following important artistic performances have been held in Ulassai in the past:

- Linking to the Mountain 1981 by Maria Lai
- InterVento 1982 by Ettore Consolazione
- Cuore mio 2019 by Marcello Maloberti
