= Jerzu =

Jerzu Jersu (Sardinian)
- Comune
- Comune di Jerzu
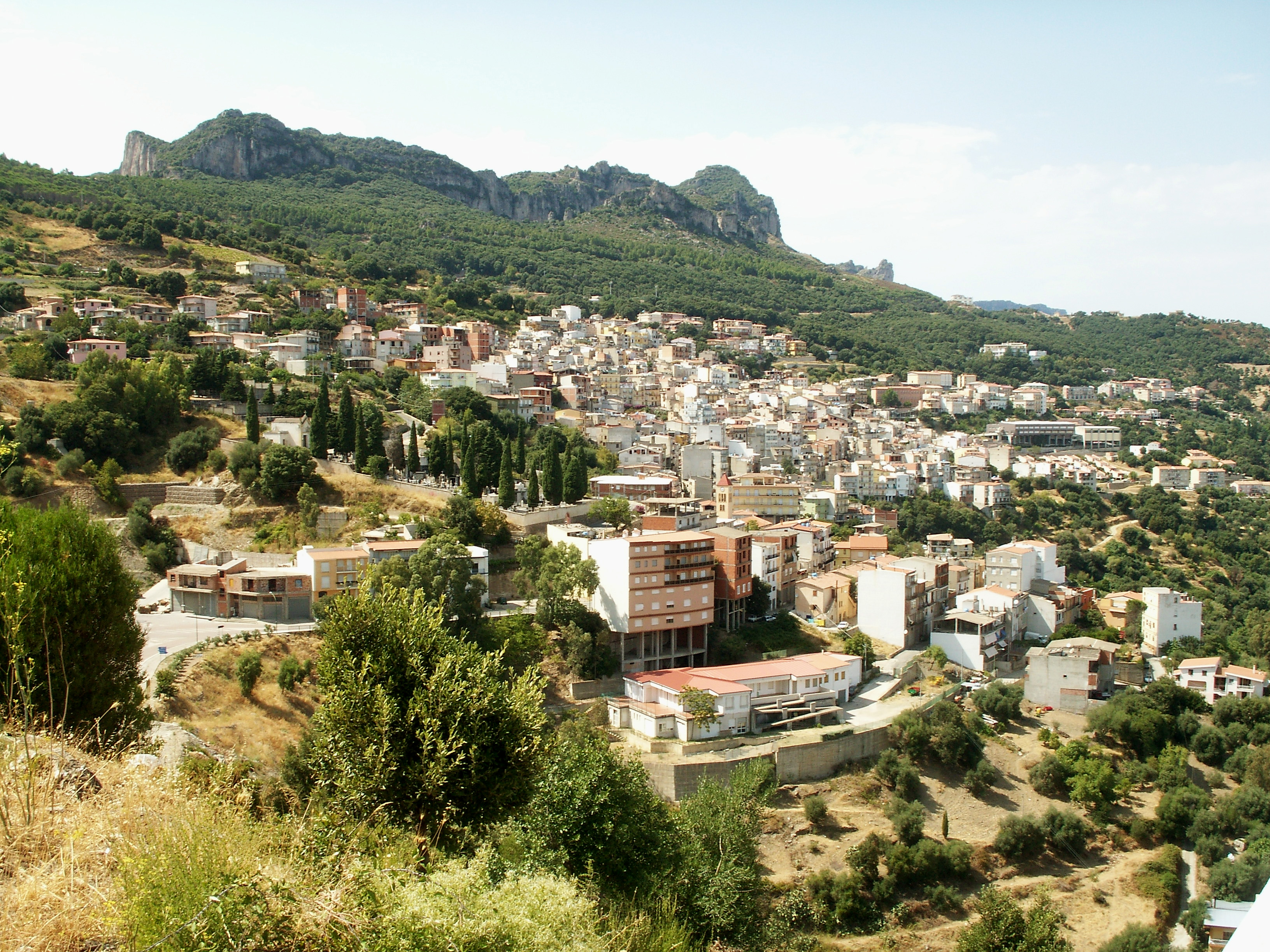
- View of Jerzu

- Location within Sardinia
- Coordinates: 39°47′N 9°31′E
- Country: Italy
- Region: Sardinia
- Province: Ogliastra

Area
  - Total: 102.41 km^{2} (39.54 sq mi)
- Elevation: 470 m (1,540 ft)

Population (2026)
  - Total: 2,912
  - Density: 28.43/km^{2} (73.65/sq mi)
- Demonym: Jerzesi
- Time zone: UTC+1 (CET)
  - Summer (DST): UTC+2 (CEST)
- Postal code: 08044
- Dialing code: 0782

Jerzu (Sardinian: Jersu) is a town and comune (municipality) in the Province of Ogliastra in the autonomous island region of Sardinia in Italy, located about 70 kilometres (43 mi) northeast of Cagliari and about 20 kilometres (12 mi) southwest of Tortolì. It has 2,912 inhabitants.

Jerzu is known for the production of a particular type of wine, called Cannonau di Jerzu.

Jerzu borders the municipalities of Arzana, Cardedu, Gairo, Lanusei, Osini, Tertenia, Ulassai, and Villaputzu.

== Demographics ==
As of 2026, the population is 2,912, of which 49.6% are male, and 50.4% are female. Minors make up 14.9% of the population, and seniors make up 27.5%.

Historical population

Year	Pop.	±%
1861	2,032	—
1871	2,136	+5.1%
1881	2,510	+17.5%
1901	3,506	+39.7%
1911	3,502	−0.1%
1921	3,854	+10.1%
1931	4,006	+3.9%
1936	4,073	+1.7%

Year	Pop.	±%
1951	3,997	−1.9%
1961	3,960	−0.9%
1971	3,874	−2.2%
1981	3,728	−3.8%
1991	3,568	−4.3%
2001	3,352	−6.1%
2011	3,228	−3.7%
2021	3,054	−5.4%

Source: ISTAT

=== Immigration ===
As of 2025, immigrants make up 3.2% of the total population. The 5 largest foreign countries of birth are France, Germany, Romania, the United Kingdom, and Argentina.
