= Province of Ogliastra =

Coordinates: 39.8833°N 9.5500°E

Province of Ogliastra Provincia dell'Ogliastra (Italian) Provìntzia de Ogiastra (Sardinian)
- Province
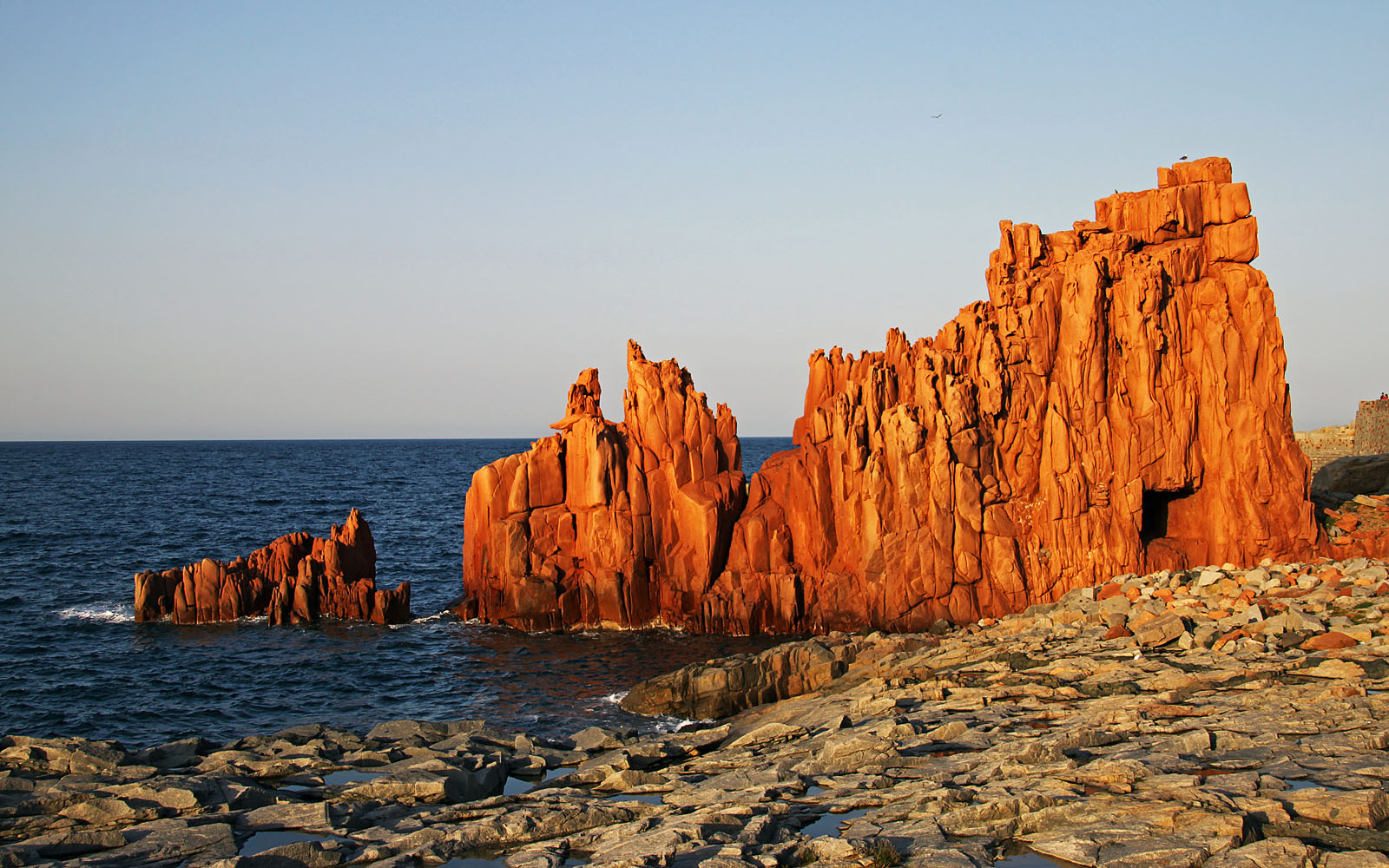
- Red rocks in Arbatax, Tortolì

- Flag Coat of arms

- Location of the province of Ogliastra in Italy
- Country: Italy
- Region: Sardinia
- Established: May 2005
- Disestablished: 4 February 2016
- Reestablished: 16 April 2021
- Reactivated: 1 May 2025
- Capital(s): Lanusei and Tortolì
- Municipalities: 23

Government
  - President: Alessio Seoni

Area
  - Total: 1,854.55 km^{2} (716.05 sq mi)

Population (2026)
  - Total: 53,722
  - Density: 28.968/km^{2} (75.026/sq mi)

GDP
  - Total: €1.002 billion (2015)
  - Per capita: €17,432 (2015)
- Time zone: UTC+1 (CET)
  - Summer (DST): UTC+2 (CEST)
- Postal code: 080xx
- Telephone prefix: 0782
- Vehicle registration: OG
- ISTAT code: 105
- Website: Official website

The province of Ogliastra (Italian: provincia dell'Ogliastra, [proˈvintʃa delloʎˈʎastra], Sardinian: Provìntzia de Ogiastra) is a province in the autonomous island region of Sardinia in Italy. The province has two capitals; Lanusei and Tortolì. Ogliastra is the most mountainous province in Sardinia. With 53,722 inhabitants as of 2026, it is also the least populous province of Italy, and with a population density of 28 inhabitants per square kilometer, also the least densely populated.

It was established in 2005 from a section of the province of Nuoro, however it was disestablished 2016 Regional Decree and integrated back into the province of Nuoro, and then re-established on 1 May 2025 per a 2021 decree.

== History ==
The province of Ogliastra roughly corresponds to the medieval Judicate of Agugliastra.

The province was founded in 2001 when the number of Sardinian provinces was doubled.

On 6 May 2012, the regional referendums of Sardinia took place regarding the abolition of certain provinces and a variety of other matters. The suggestion of reforming or abolishing certain provinces in Sardinia was approved by the Regional Council of Sardinia on 24 May 2012. Due to this, the province of Ogliastra was ordered to form a new administrative body or be abolished on 1 March 2013, but this expiry date for constitutional changes was extended to 1 July 2013. After the regional law number 15 of 28 June 2013, the province was allowed to maintain its functions, before it was eventually disestablished in 2016, all of its municipalities but one joined the Province of Nuoro, with the municipality of Seui joining the newly-established Province of South Sardinia.

In April 2021, under Sardinian Regional Council's Regional Law Nr. 7, the province was restored with 22 municipalities; the municipality of Seulo remained a part of the province of Nuoro, whilst the comune of Seui joined the metropolitan city of Cagliari. Whilst the Italian government challenged the law, thus stalling its implementation, on March 12, 2022, the Constitutional Court ruled in favor of the Autonomous Region of Sardinia. On April 13, 2023, the regional council, at the proposal of the regional government, approved an amendment to the 2021 reform, defining the timeframe and manner of its implementation, which became effective on 1 May 2025.

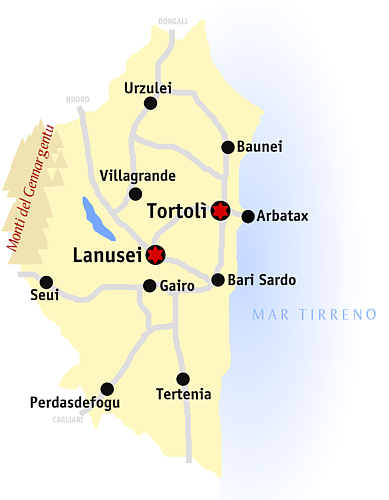
Towns and roads of the province

== Geography ==
Facing the Tyrrhenian Sea to the east, it borders the metropolitan city of Cagliari to the southwest and the province of Nuoro to the northwest. It contained the river Flumendosa and the lake of Basso Flumendosa, and it also contained large massif Gennargentu.

== Government ==
=== Provincial elections ===
Ogliastra Provincial Election Results June 2010
Name	Party	1st Preference Votes	%	2nd Preference Votes	%
Bruno Pilia	PD	13,556	41.1	13,700	51.0
Sandro Daniele Mario Rubiu	PdL	14,446	43.8	13,169	49.0

=== Municipalities ===
The province has 23 municipalities:

- Arzana
- Bari Sardo
- Baunei
- Cardedu
- Elini
- Gairo
- Girasole
- Ilbono
- Jerzu
- Lanusei
- Loceri
- Lotzorai
- Osini
- Perdasdefogu
- Seui
- Talana
- Tertenia
- Tortolì
- Triei
- Ulassai
- Urzulei
- Ussassai
- Villagrande Strisaili

== Demographics ==
As of 2026, the population is 53,722, of which 49.4% are male, and 50.6% are female. Minors make up 13.3% of the population, and seniors make up 28.1%.

Historical population

Year	Pop.	±%
1861	25,708	—
1871	26,539	+3.2%
1881	27,911	+5.2%
1901	34,318	+23.0%
1911	38,013	+10.8%
1921	38,566	+1.5%
1931	41,934	+8.7%
1936	43,894	+4.7%

Year	Pop.	±%
1951	50,271	+14.5%
1961	56,943	+13.3%
1971	57,871	+1.6%
1981	60,229	+4.1%
1991	59,943	−0.5%
2001	58,389	−2.6%
2011	57,329	−1.8%
2021	54,829	−4.4%

Source: ISTAT

=== Immigration ===
As of 2025, the foreign-born population is 2,696, making up 5.0% of the total population.

== See also ==
- Arbatax
- IT.A.CÀ - Festival of Responsible Tourism
- Monte Perda Liana
