= Gairo, Sardinia =

Gairo Gàiru (Sardinian)
- Comune
- Comune di Gairo
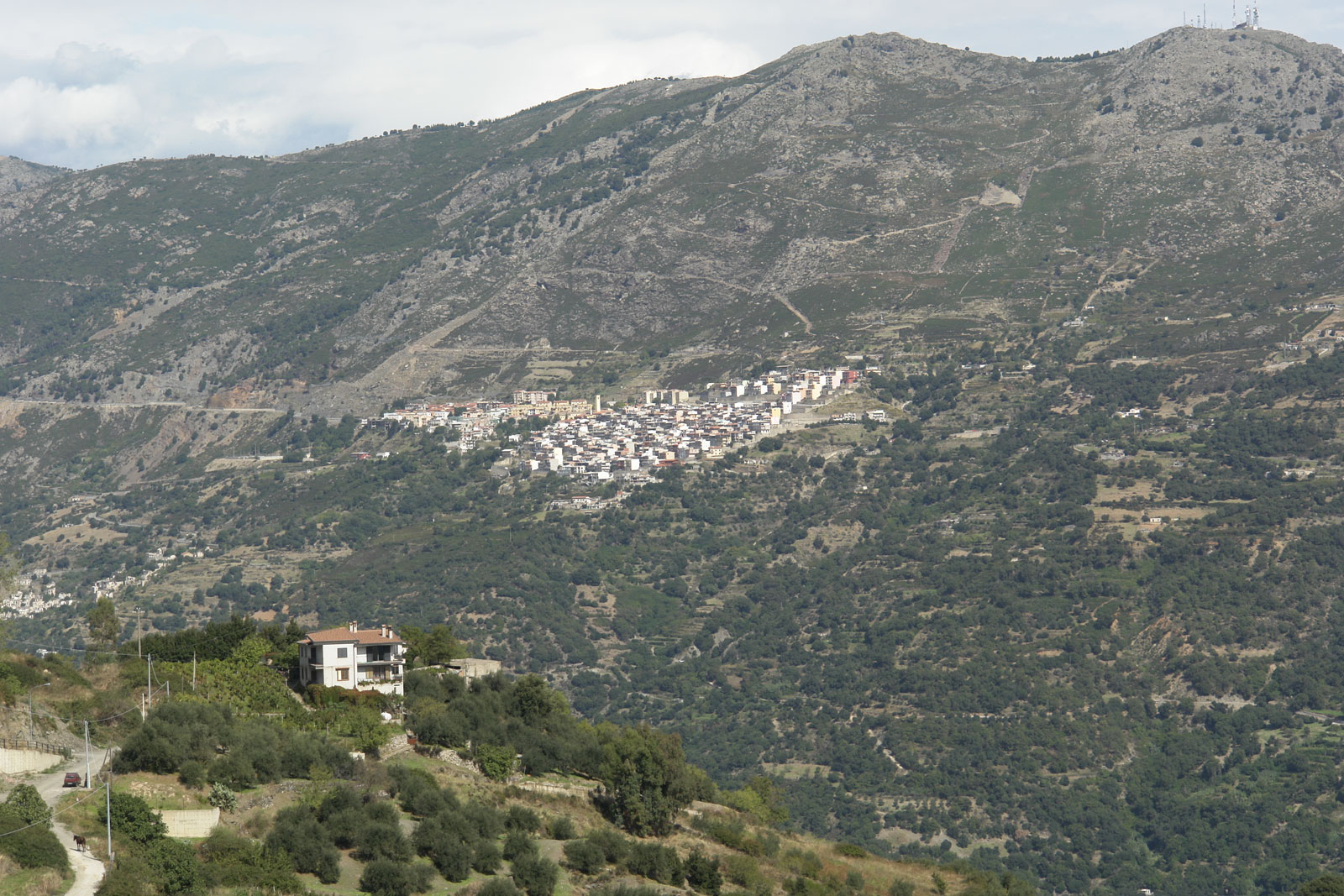
- View of Gairo

- Location within Sardinia
- Coordinates: 39°51′N 9°30′E
- Country: Italy
- Region: Sardinia
- Province: Ogliastra
- Frazioni: Su Sirboni, Taquisara

Government
  - Mayor: Sergio Lorrai

Area
  - Total: 77.49 km^{2} (29.92 sq mi)
- Elevation: 690 m (2,260 ft)

Population (2026)
  - Total: 1,272
  - Density: 16.42/km^{2} (42.51/sq mi)
- Time zone: UTC+1 (CET)
  - Summer (DST): UTC+2 (CEST)
- Postal code: 08040
- Dialing code: 0782
- Patron saint: Saint Helena
- Saint day: 17–20 August period
- Website: Comune di Gairo

Gairo (Sardinian: Gàiru) is a town and comune (municipality) in the Province of Ogliastra in the autonomous island region of Sardinia in Italy, located about 80 kilometres (50 mi) northeast of Cagliari and about 30 kilometres (19 mi) southwest of Tortolì. It has 1,272 inhabitants.

== History ==
The area was already inhabited in the Nuragic era.

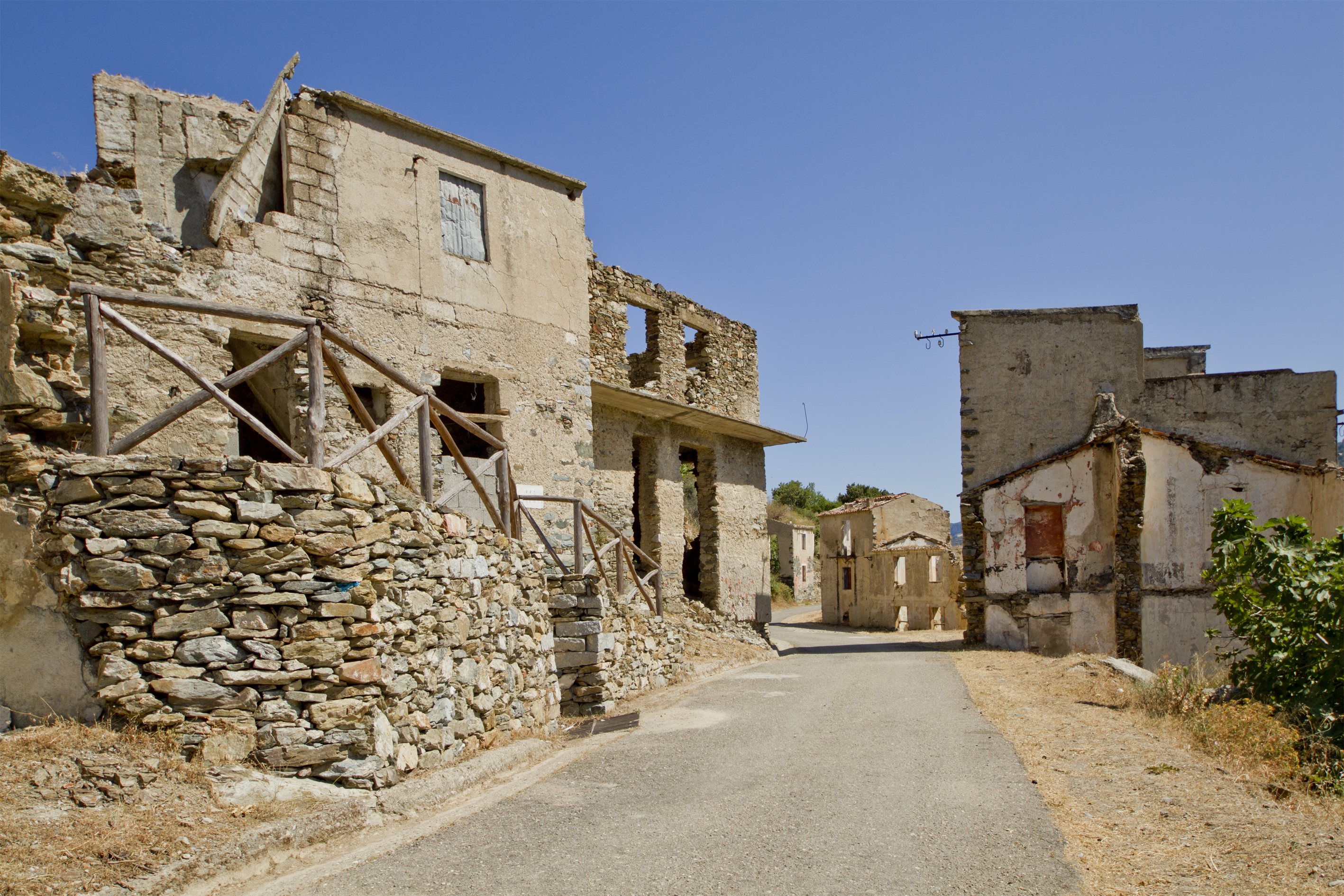
Gairo Vecchio, Sardinia

Its history is turbulent. It began in the late 19th century, when several violent storms caused landslides and mudslides, and continued for about half a century.

The current location of Gairo is due to a flood in 1951 that forced people to abandon the old village constructed on unstable ground and to build a new one at an uphill location. The move was completed in 1969. Part of the population of the old village was other wise forced to move to the lowlands and built the village of Cardedu (municipality on its own since 1984).

The old village is still located 2 km (1.2 mi) south from the new one. It is a village dating back to the 14th century and it is known as Gairo Vecchio. It is one of the most famous abandoned places in Sardinia and in Italy is open to visitors.

=== Symbols ===
The coat of arms and banner of the municipality of Gairo were granted by decree of the President of the Republic on March 5, 1984.The coat of arms is truncated: the upper part depicts Mount Perda Liana, the lower part depicts the sea with the sun on the horizon. The banner is a blue cloth.

== Geography ==
The municipality is located in the Barbagia sub-region of Ogliastra.

Gairo borders the municipalities of Cardedu, Jerzu, Lanusei, Osini, Seui, Tertenia, Ulassai, and Ussassai.

== Demographics ==
As of 2026, the population is 1,272, of which 49.2% are male, and 50.8% are female. Minors make up 12.3% of the population, and seniors make up 28.6%.

Historical population

| Year | Pop. | ±% |
|---|---|---|
| 1861 | 853 | — |
| 1871 | 920 | +7.9% |
| 1881 | 1,010 | +9.8% |
| 1901 | 1,285 | +27.2% |
| 1911 | 1,422 | +10.7% |
| 1921 | 1,400 | −1.5% |
| 1931 | 1,526 | +9.0% |
| 1936 | 1,580 | +3.5% |

| Year | Pop. | ±% |
|---|---|---|
| 1951 | 1,717 | +8.7% |
| 1961 | 1,902 | +10.8% |
| 1971 | 1,798 | −5.5% |
| 1981 | 1,968 | +9.5% |
| 1991 | 1,716 | −12.8% |
| 2001 | 1,678 | −2.2% |
| 2011 | 1,514 | −9.8% |
| 2021 | 1,304 | −13.9% |

Source: ISTAT

=== Languages ===
Apart from Italian, learnt at school, local people speak a dialect of Sardinian language, Gairese, belonging to ogliastrino-campidanese variant of Sardinian languages.

=== Immigration ===
As of 2025, immigrants make up 6.5% of the total population. The 5 largest foreign countries of birth are Germany, Morocco, Belgium, France, and Romania.

== Monuments and places of interest ==
=== Religious architecture ===
Church of Sant'Elena Imperatrice is located in the historic center of Gairo Sant'Elena. Among the ruins of Gairo Vecchio, there is the restored church.

=== Civil Architecture ===
- Ferdinando Caliumi Astronomical Observatory: Open to the public, the site is located at 1150 metres above sea level near Mount Armidda. Transferred to Gairo from Lanusei in 2017following a specific ruling by the Court of Appeal of Cagliari and founded by members of the Ogliastrina Astronomy Association with the contribution of the municipality of Lanusei in 1989, it carries out dissemination and research activities.

=== Archaeological Sites ===
Nuraghe Serbissi: the municipality is also known for the archeological sites which exactly divides the territorial borders of Gairo and Osini.There are numerous nuraghes and Nuragic villages present, among which those of “is Tostoinus” and “Pedru Isu” are noteworthy.

=== Natural Areas ===
The Gairo area is vast, stretching from the Gennargentu mountains to the sea. Among the naturalistic sites in the municipality are Monte Perda Liana and the Taquisara Cave.

Perd'e Liana, for instance, is one of the most important and evocative morphological conformations in Sardinia. It is a natural monument constituted by a vertical tower, a so-called heel or "tonneri" in Sardinian, that races skywards. At 1293 m, it is one of the best known natural monuments on the island for its strange appearance. It is slender and elegant in form and is two kilometres from the edge of the highland of Tonneri.

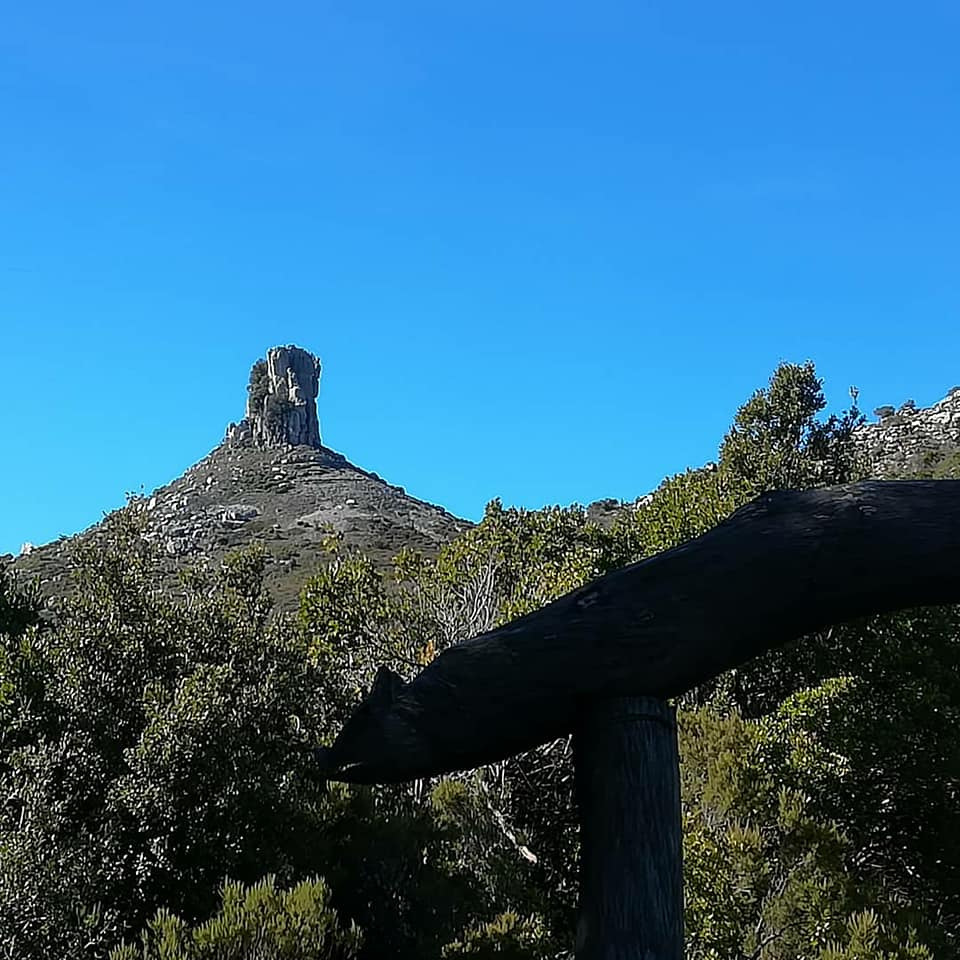
Perd'e Liana, Gairo

The highest part of the heel is about fifty metres wide but has vertical walls that rise 100 metres. The light-coloured sides of its walls contrast with the greyness of the rocks that surround it. Its base is in a conical trunk conformation. For the Ogliastra region, this natural monument constitutes the most important evidence of erosion of the large calcareous strata of the Giurese that has covered this part of the island for about ten million years and, being visible over a long distance, constituted a reference point for all those that crossed these mountain zones in times gone by.

It was considered as a holy mountain by the Nuragic people inhabiting the zone. Its name seems to be linked to the name given by the Romans to the old tribe inhabiting the zone: Ilienses (literally, "the stone of Ilienses"). This people resisted to Roman occupation for centuries.

The cave overlooks the hamlet of Taquisara, from which it takes its name, with approximately 200 inhabitants and approximately 8 km from Gairo.

On the coast, the beaches of Su Sirboni and Coccorrocci are noteworthy,as is the imposing Monte Ferru, which features evocative natural pools called "Piscinas." In addition to wild boars, foxes, etc., the mountain is also home to particularly important species such as the mouflon, of which several dozen specimens remain.

== Culture ==
=== Events ===
Local people use to crowd it again once a year, on the 17–20 August period, to celebrate Saint Elena, patroness of the village.

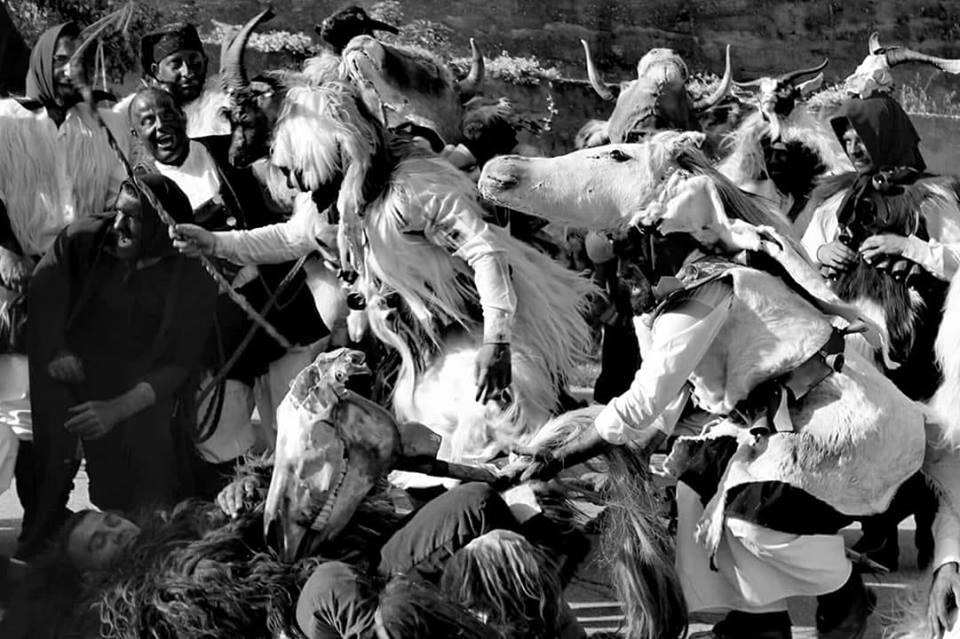
Su Maimulu, Gairo

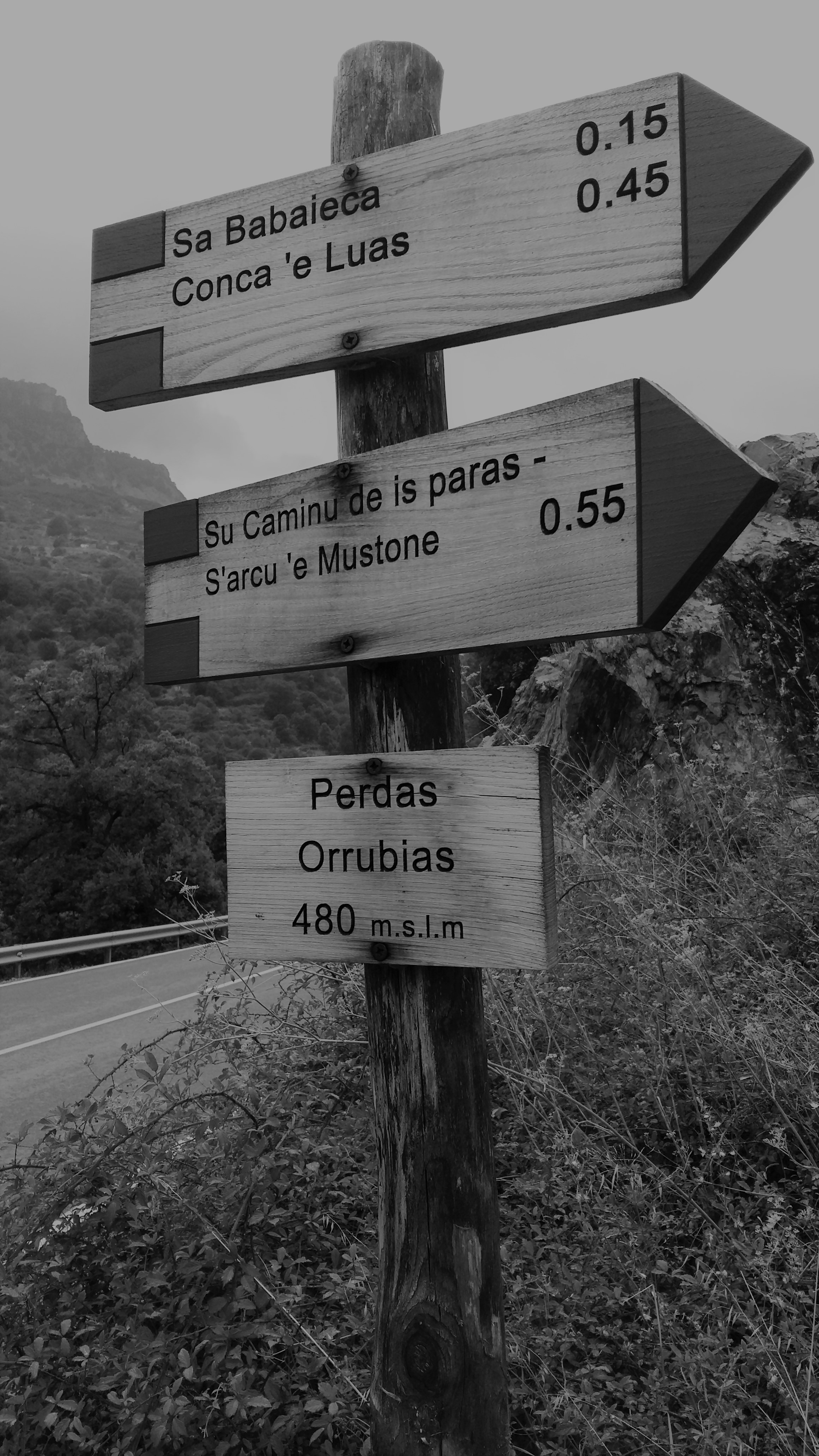
Sa Babaieca, Gairo

In that occasion not only religious celebrations have place but also big parties with traditional food (sa cocoi) and the old Carnival, Su Maimulu, one of the most particular Carnival of all Sardinia (it has its raisins in the pre-Christian and pre-Roman era).

Like all Sardinian Carnivals, in the Carnival period people use to wear horrific masks and to represent an ancestral fight between the wild nature and the community, between the Good and the Bad. This representations have their raisins in the pagan era, before than Roman and Christian arrive. They are deeply linked to the rural life and to the hopes of ols communities inhabiting the zone.

The Carnival period usually begins on the 17 January (Saint Anthony celebrations) with an enormous falò in the main square of the village, but the main day for celebrations is called Marti Perra.

=== Legends ===
The most famous legend linked to the village is that of Sa Babaieca. According to this legend, old people aged 70 used to assume hallucinogen herbs (sa lua, euphorbia) and to reach a big rock south of the village accompanied by the oldest male son. Once they reached the rock, they used to jump down, as to avoid weighing down the community.

The rock called Sa Babaieca is located one km South of the old village and it is open to visitors. The path to reach it is curiously called Conch'e luas, literally "head of euphorbia" (the hallucinogen herb that according to the legend was assumed before than jumping from the rock).

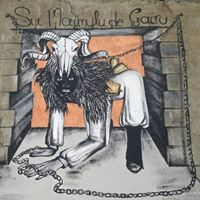
"Su Maimulu de Gairu", A. Ascedu

=== Art ===
There are many wall paintings on the village, which represent daily life of the community. Particular is the painting representing one mask of the old Carnival, "Su Maimulu de Gairu". There are also sculptures representing soldiers fallen during WWI and again Su Maimulu.

The murals of Sardinia are also present in Gairo with works created by various island artists. The muralist Antonio Aregoni to depict the old culture of making in Gairo Vecchio such as the ancient millstones that were used in the oil mills until the 1960s of the last century.

== Gallery ==
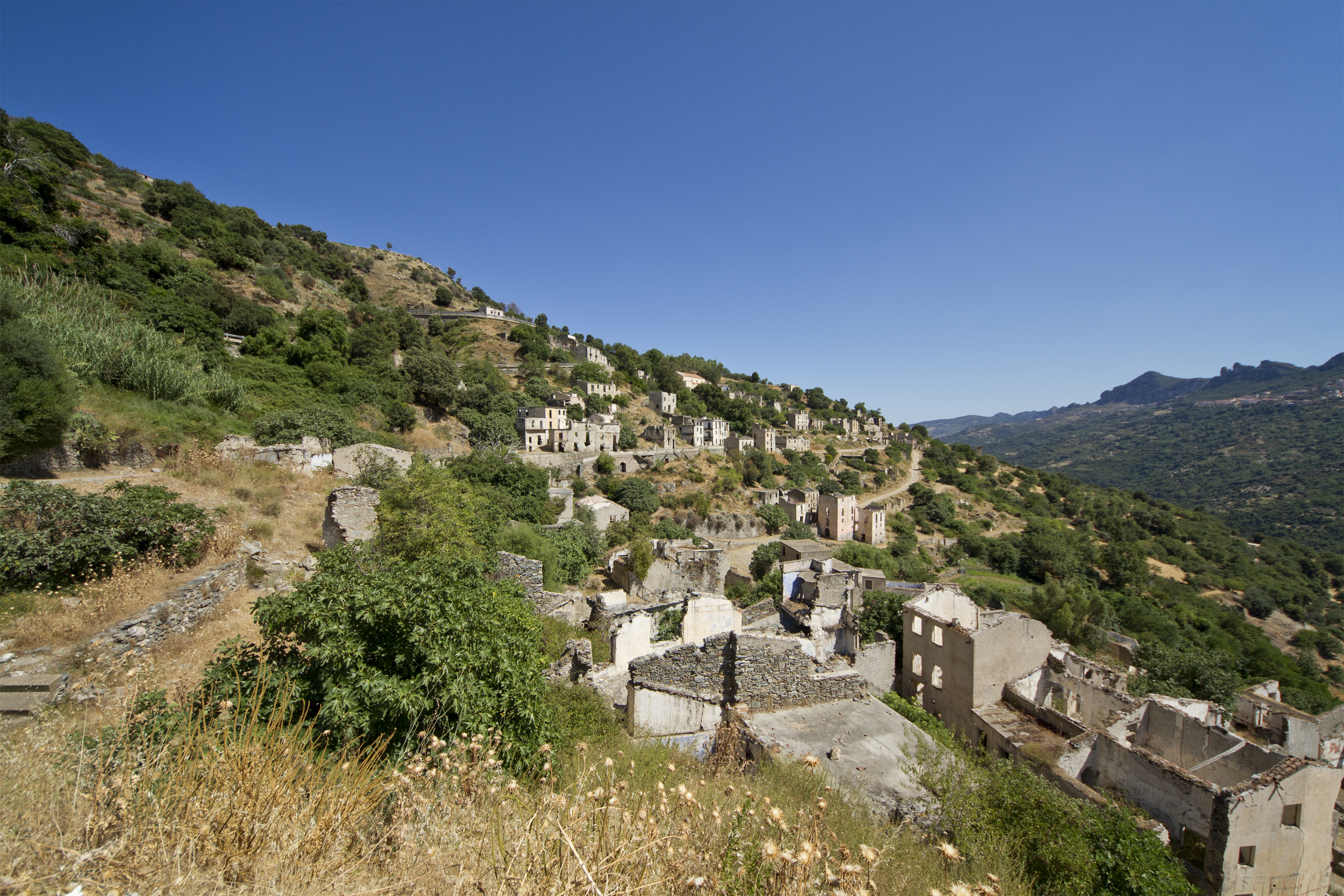
Old Gairo

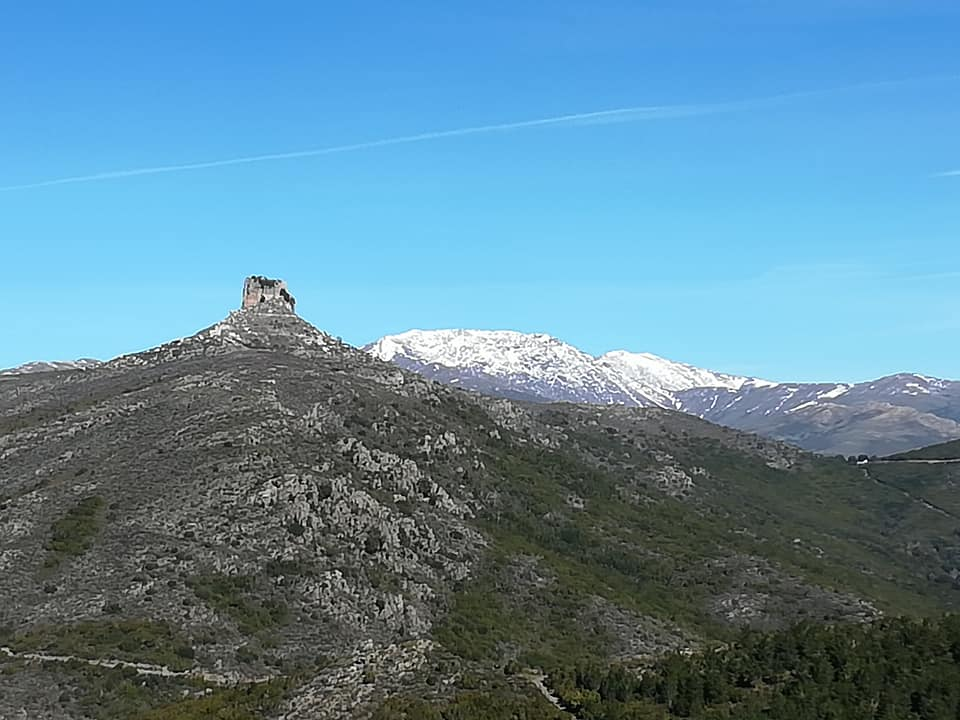
Perd'e Liana, Gairo

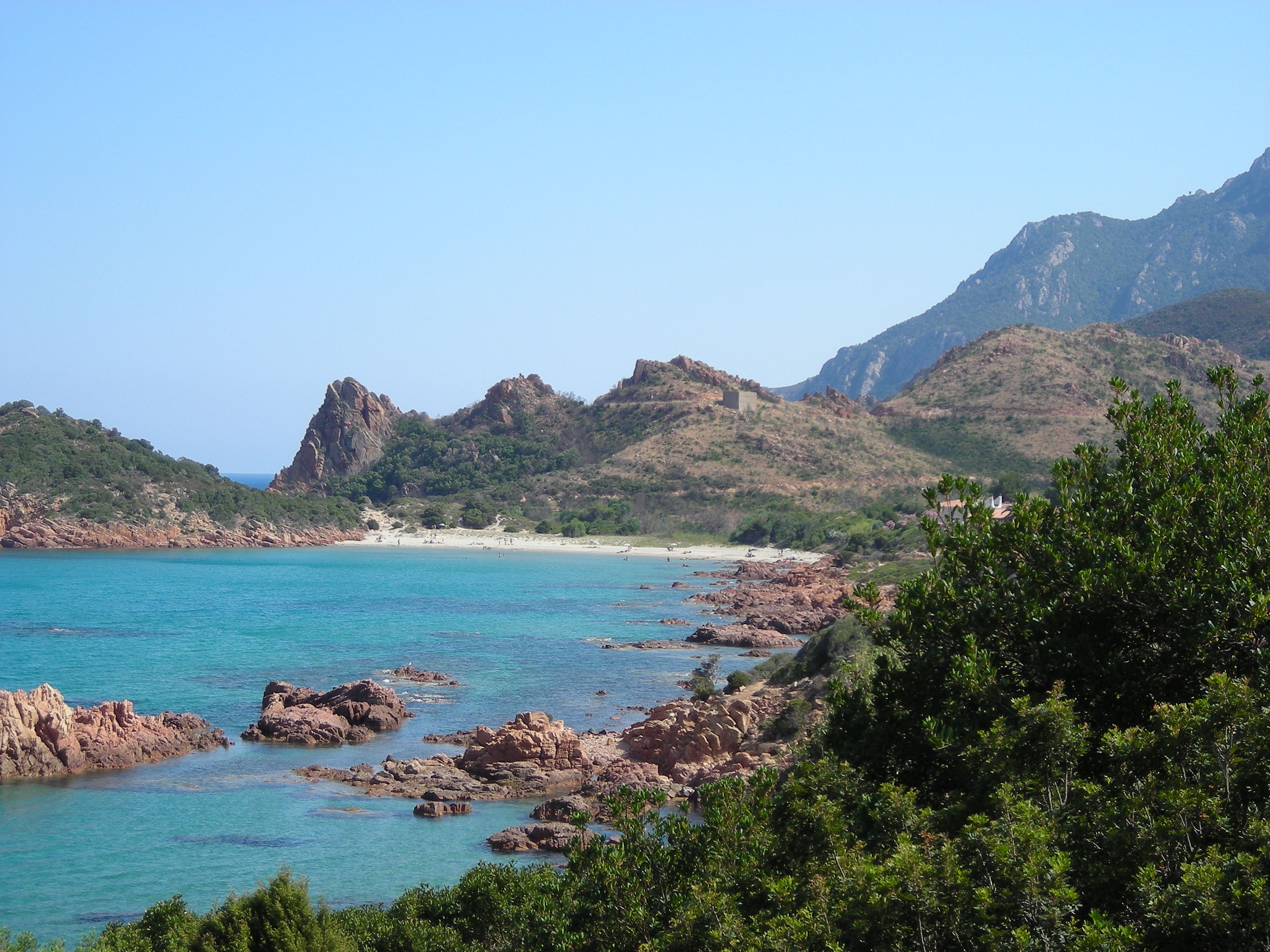
Su Sirboni beach

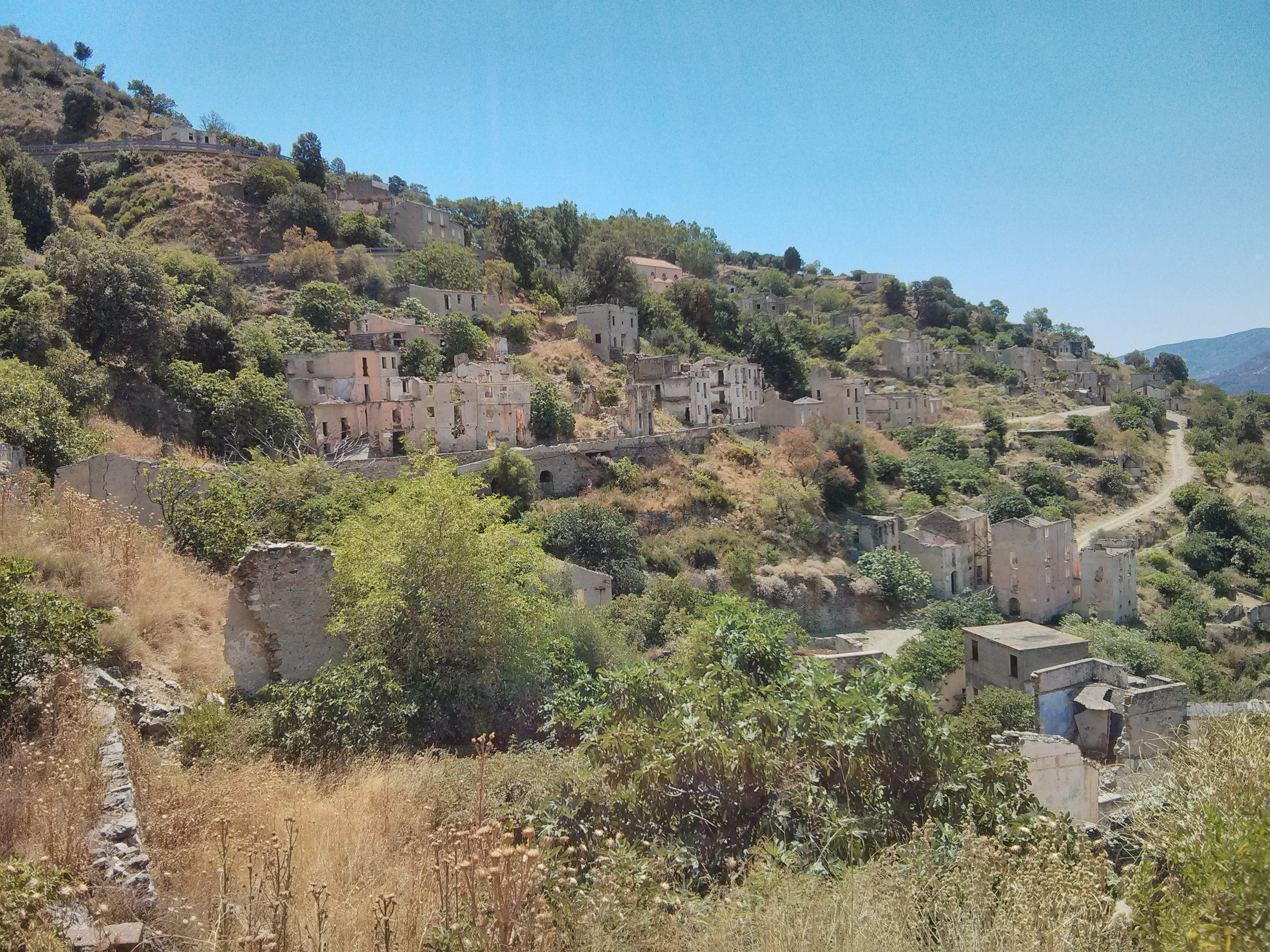
Old Gairo

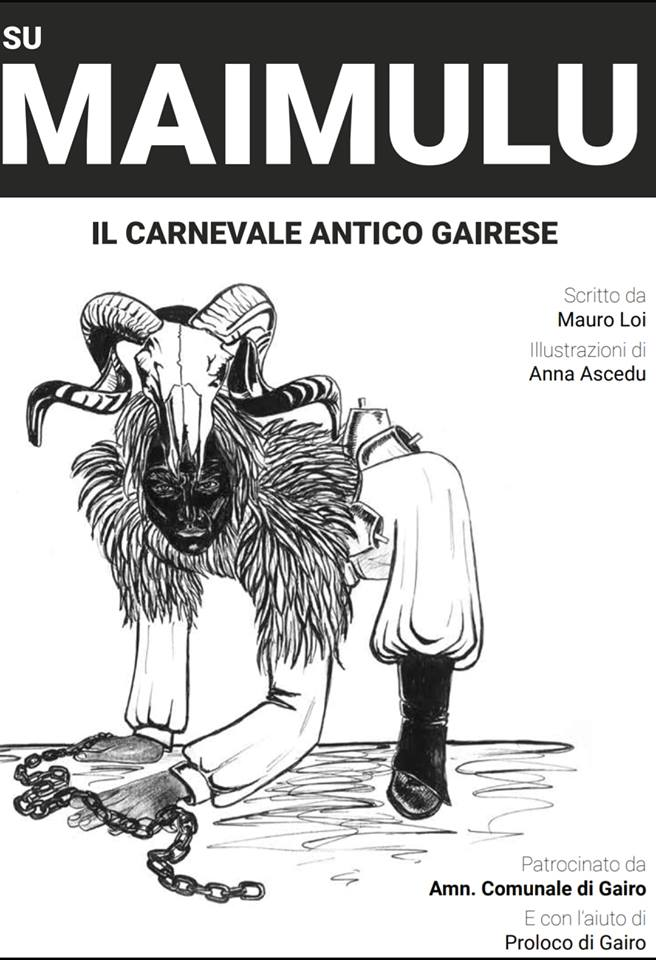
Su Maimulu, the ancient Gairese carnival
