= Gamma-shaped hilt dagger =

Sacrificial knife

The gamma-shaped hilt dagger (in Italian: Pugnale ad elsa gammata) is a type of bronze dagger typical of the Nuragic civilization in Sardinia. It owes its name to the inverted gamma-shaped handle. Used for animal sacrifices, they are widespread in Nuragic sanctuaries.

They are dated to the early Iron Age and are often represented in the Nuragic bronze statuettes on men's chests; according to some scholars they appeared as early as the Late Bronze Age. It was a weapon with a strong symbolic value, a sign of belonging to the social body.

== Gallery ==
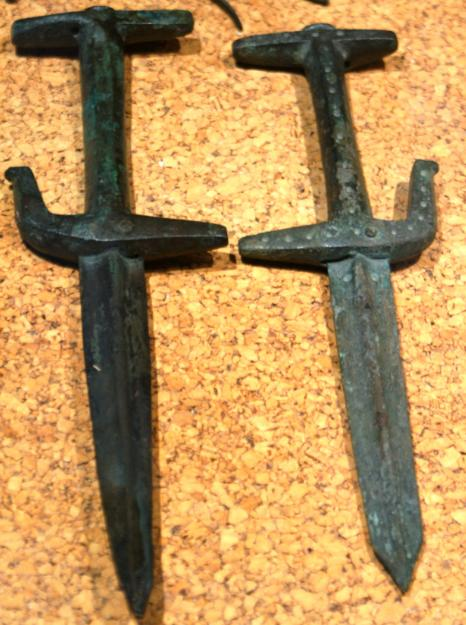
gamma-shaped hilt daggers from Su Benatzu, Santadi. National Archaeological Museum, Cagliari

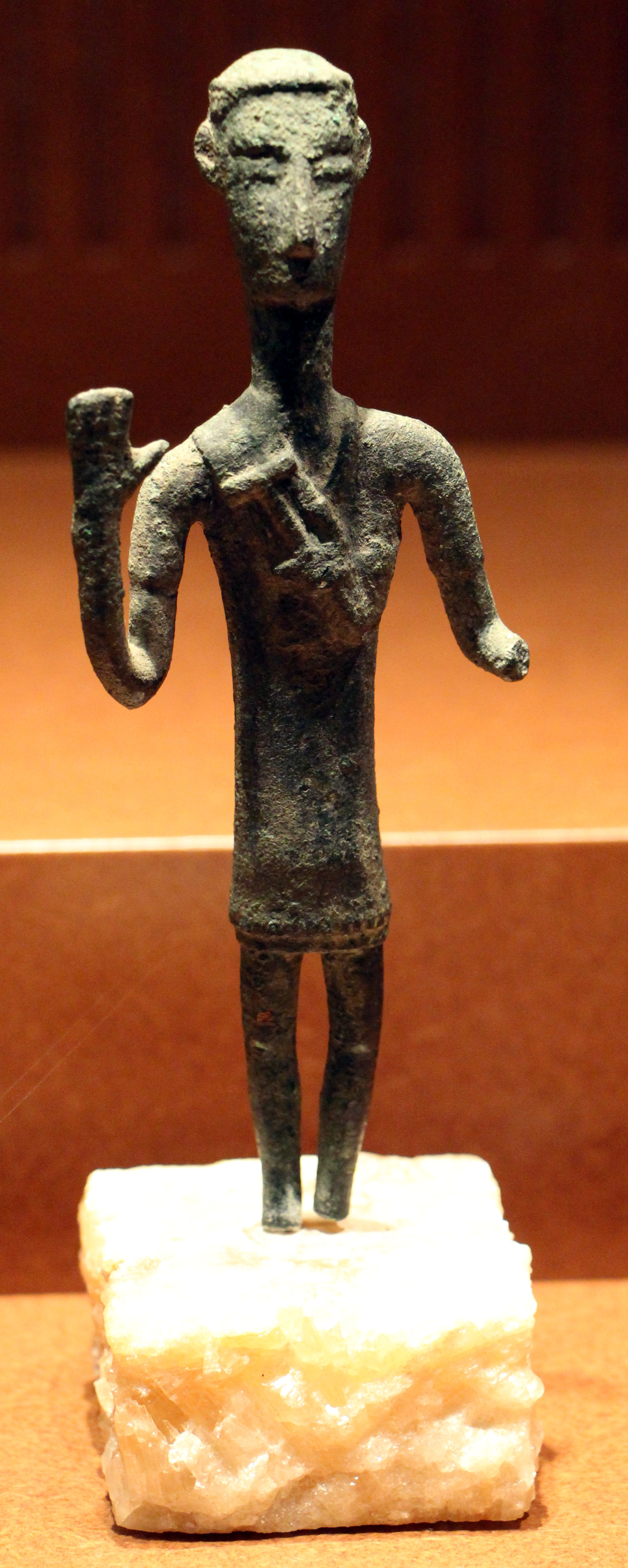
Chief with gamma-shaped hilt daggers on his chest, Fluminimaggiore, Antas

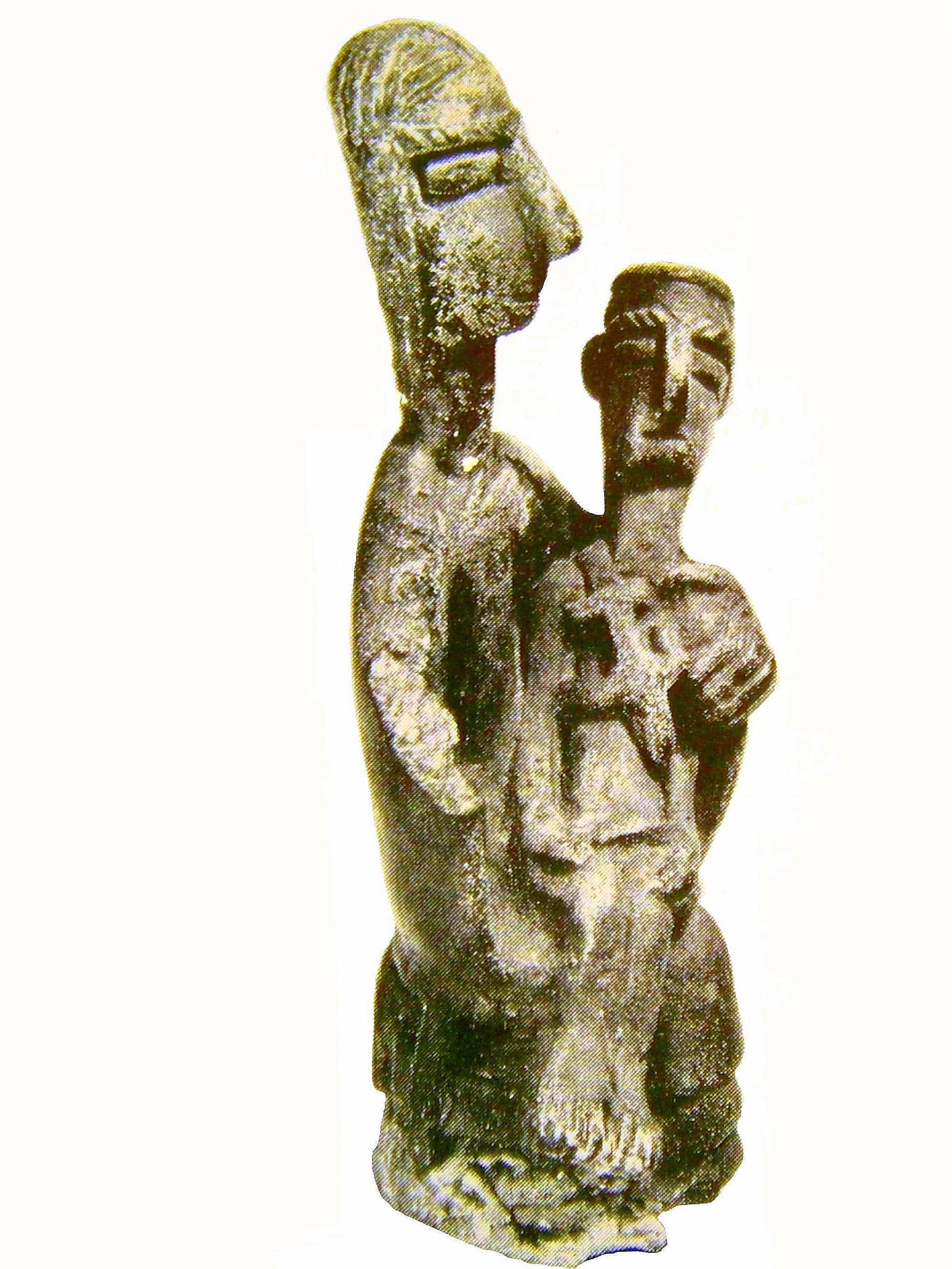
The "mother of the killed" bronze statuette from Urzulei, the young man has a gamma-shaped hilt dagger on his chest

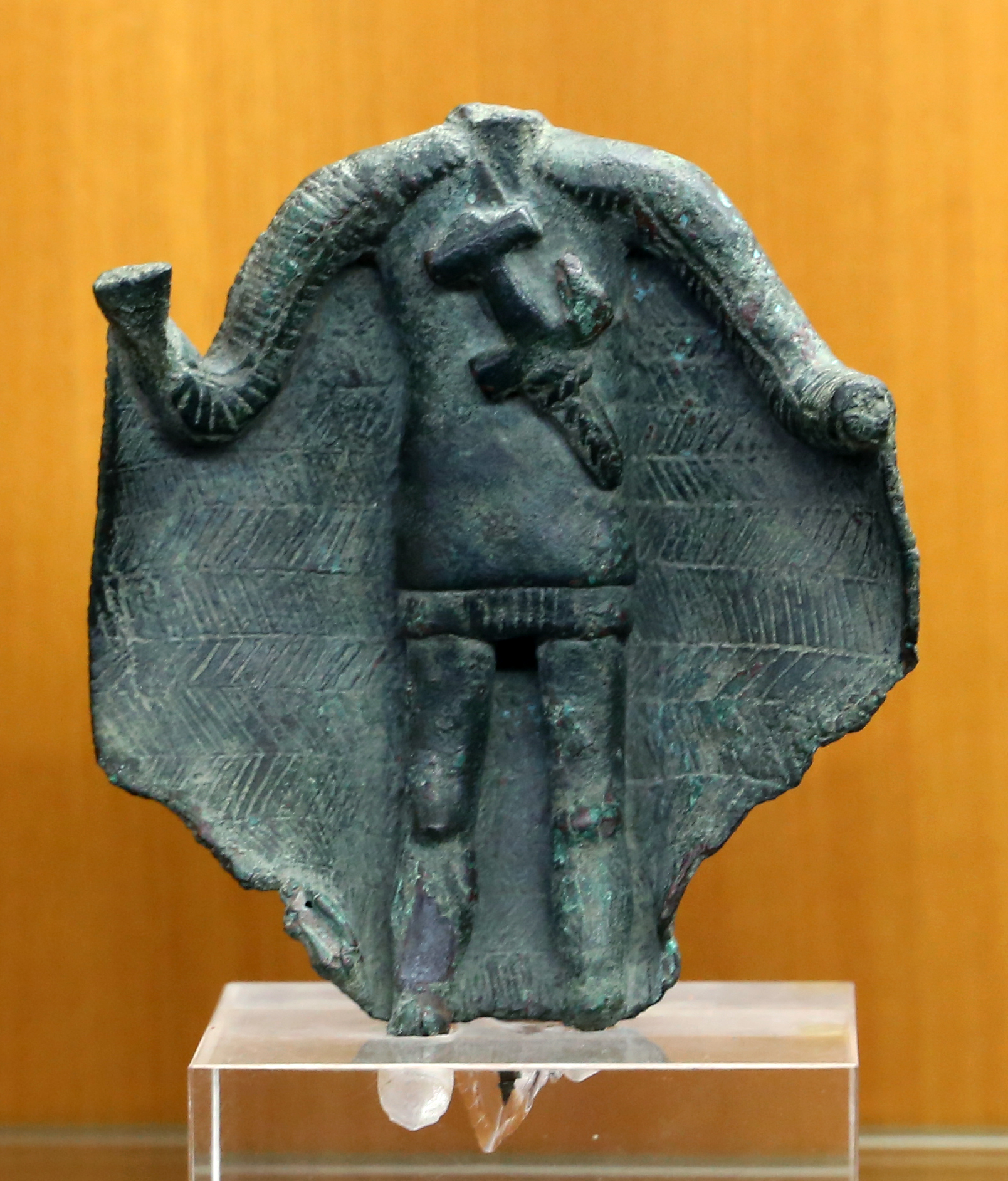
Prince with a gamma-shaped hilt dagger, Torralba

== Bibliography ==
- Nadia Canu, Antonella Fois, Il pugnale ad elsa gammata nella civiltà nuragica Nuove attestazioni iconografiche da contesti santuariali, 2016
