= Pietrafesa =

Pietrafesa may refer to:

- Satriano di Lucania, formerly known as Pietrafesa
- Giovanni De Gregorio, also known as Il Pietrafesa (painter)
