= Satriano di Lucania =

- Comune
- Comune di Satriano di Lucania
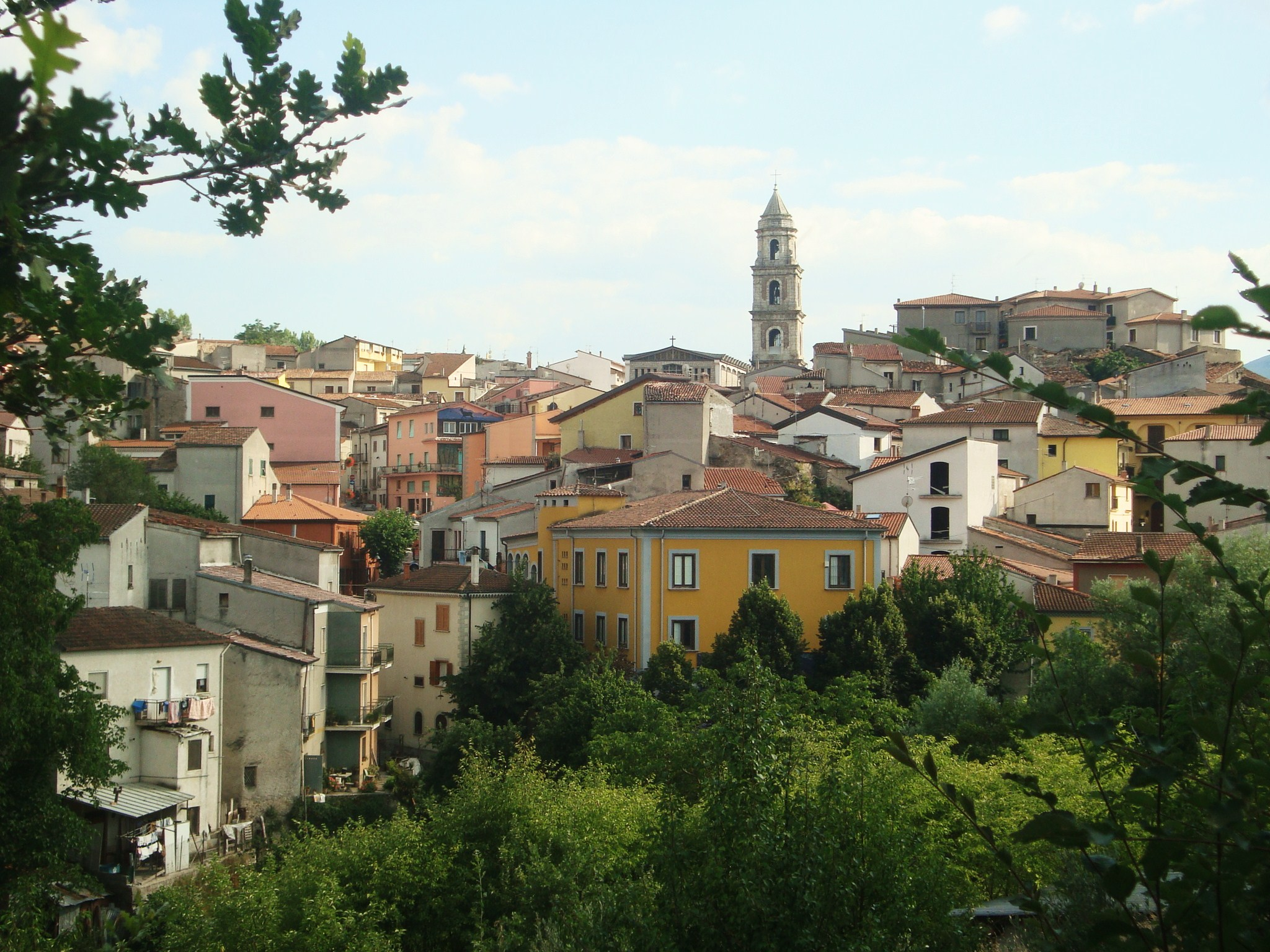
- View of Satriano di Lucania

- Coat of arms

- Location within Italy Location within Basilicata
- Coordinates: 40°33′N 15°39′E
- Country: Italy
- Region: Basilicata
- Province: Potenza (PZ)
- Frazioni: Contrada Canonica, Contrada Isca, Contrada Pantanelle-Campo di Rato, Contrada Piano dei Prati, Contrada Serra, Contrada Vigna la Noce

Government
  - Mayor: Umberto Vita

Area
  - Total: 33 km^{2} (13 sq mi)
- Elevation: 650 m (2,130 ft)

Population (01 January 2017)
  - Total: 2,345
  - Density: 71/km^{2} (180/sq mi)
- Demonym: Satrianesi
- Time zone: UTC+1 (CET)
  - Summer (DST): UTC+2 (CEST)
- Postal code: 85050
- Dialing code: 0975
- ISTAT code: 076083
- Patron saint: St. Roch
- Saint day: 16 May, 16 August, and 16 December
- Website: Official website

Satriano di Lucania is a town and comune in the province of Potenza, in the Southern Italian region of Basilicata.

Key events in the town include the Carnival, folk festivals and the renowned murales.

== History ==
In the Middle Ages it was a small village called Pietrafixa (crushed stone, probably due to the geomorphological characteristics of the place), later Italianized in Pietrafesa until 1887, when the Municipal Administration decided to change the toponym in Satriano, borrowed by the ancient Lucan stronghold Satrianum, whose ruins are located on the mountain behind, to strengthen its historical ties with it.

In the 16th century, the town gave the nickname to the painter Giovanni De Gregorio.

In the late 19th century, the highest population growth was recorded, with almost 3000 inhabitants.

In the early 1900s (1910 - 1921), many families chose to emigrate to both North America and South America. First Some of the men came to places like New York and New Jersey. One family, Rocco Langieri, first came to New Jersey with his two oldest son's, Raphael and Salvatore around 1915 and followed later by his wife Maria and the two youngest children, Filemena and Michele. Their older married daughter, Maria Palermo and her family moved to Montevideo, Uruguay. This was typical of the emigration patterns. Over the years, the families of these Satrianese continued to move as far as California and Florida and beyond.

Since the end of the 20th century the municipal administration has begun to promote the village through the spread on the walls the so-called "murals", paintings representing the history, culture and society of the small Lucanian town. Since then these frescoes have become the main tourist attraction in the area.

== Twin towns ==
The town is twinned with:

- Montevideo, Uruguay
- Diamante, Italy
