= Giovanni De Gregorio =

Giovanni De Gregorio or de Gregorio may refer to:

- Giovanni De Gregorio (cardinal) (1729–1791)
- Giovanni De Gregorio (painter) (1579 or 1580–1656), from Satriano di Lucania, better known as Pietrafesa

== See also ==
- Giovanni De Gregori or Gregoriis (fl. 1496–1527), printer from Forlì
