= Lotzorai =

- Comune
- Comune di Lotzorai
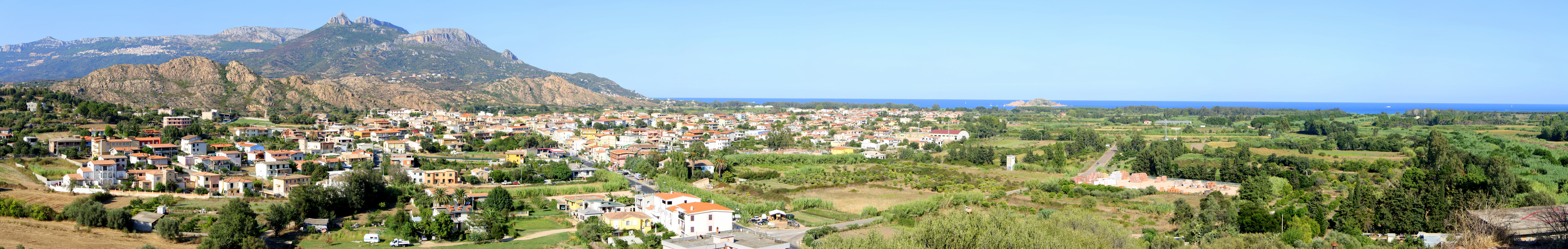
- View of Lotzorai

- Coat of arms

- Location within Sardinia
- Coordinates: 39°58′N 9°40′E
- Country: Italy
- Region: Sardinia
- Province: Ogliastra
- Frazioni: Tancau sul Mare

Government
  - Mayor: Antonello Rubiu

Area
  - Total: 16.87 km^{2} (6.51 sq mi)
- Elevation: 11 m (36 ft)

Population (2026)
  - Total: 2,122
  - Density: 125.8/km^{2} (325.8/sq mi)
- Demonym: Lotzoraesi
- Time zone: UTC+1 (CET)
  - Summer (DST): UTC+2 (CEST)
- Postal code: 08040
- Dialing code: 0782
- Website: Official website

Lotzorai is a town and comune (municipality) in the Province of Ogliastra in the autonomous island region of Sardinia in Italy, located about 100 kilometres (62 mi) northeast of Cagliari and about 4 kilometres (2 mi) northeast of Tortolì. It has 2,122 inhabitants.

The town's economy is based on agriculture and tourism. Lotzorai's territory is home to several walks, including those to Cala Goloritzè and the Gole su Gorroppu Lotzorai, while the Selvaggio Blu starts 3 kilometres (1.9 mi) from Lotzorai in Santa Maria Navarrese. Other sights include a pre-Nuragic necropolis with thirteen Domus de Janas, the Medusa Castle (a medieval fortress built over a pre-existing Phoenician structure, now in ruins) and other pre-Nuragic and Nuragic excavations.

Lotzorai borders the municipalities of Baunei, Girasole, Talana, Tortolì, Triei, and Villagrande Strisaili.

== Demographics ==
As of 2026, the population is 2,122, of which 48.1% are male, and 51.9% are female. Minors make up 12.5% of the population, and seniors make up 28.7%.

Historical population

Year	Pop.	±%
1861	702	—
1871	719	+2.4%
1881	637	−11.4%
1901	632	−0.8%
1911	673	+6.5%
1921	649	−3.6%
1931	741	+14.2%
1936	766	+3.4%

Year	Pop.	±%
1951	1,042	+36.0%
1961	1,352	+29.8%
1971	1,410	+4.3%
1981	1,747	+23.9%
1991	2,046	+17.1%
2001	2,114	+3.3%
2011	2,151	+1.8%
2021	2,116	−1.6%

Source: ISTAT

=== Immigrants ===
As of 2025, immigrants make up 6.1% of the total population. The 5 largest foreign countries of birth are Germany, Romania, France, Switzerland, and Austria.

== Gallery ==
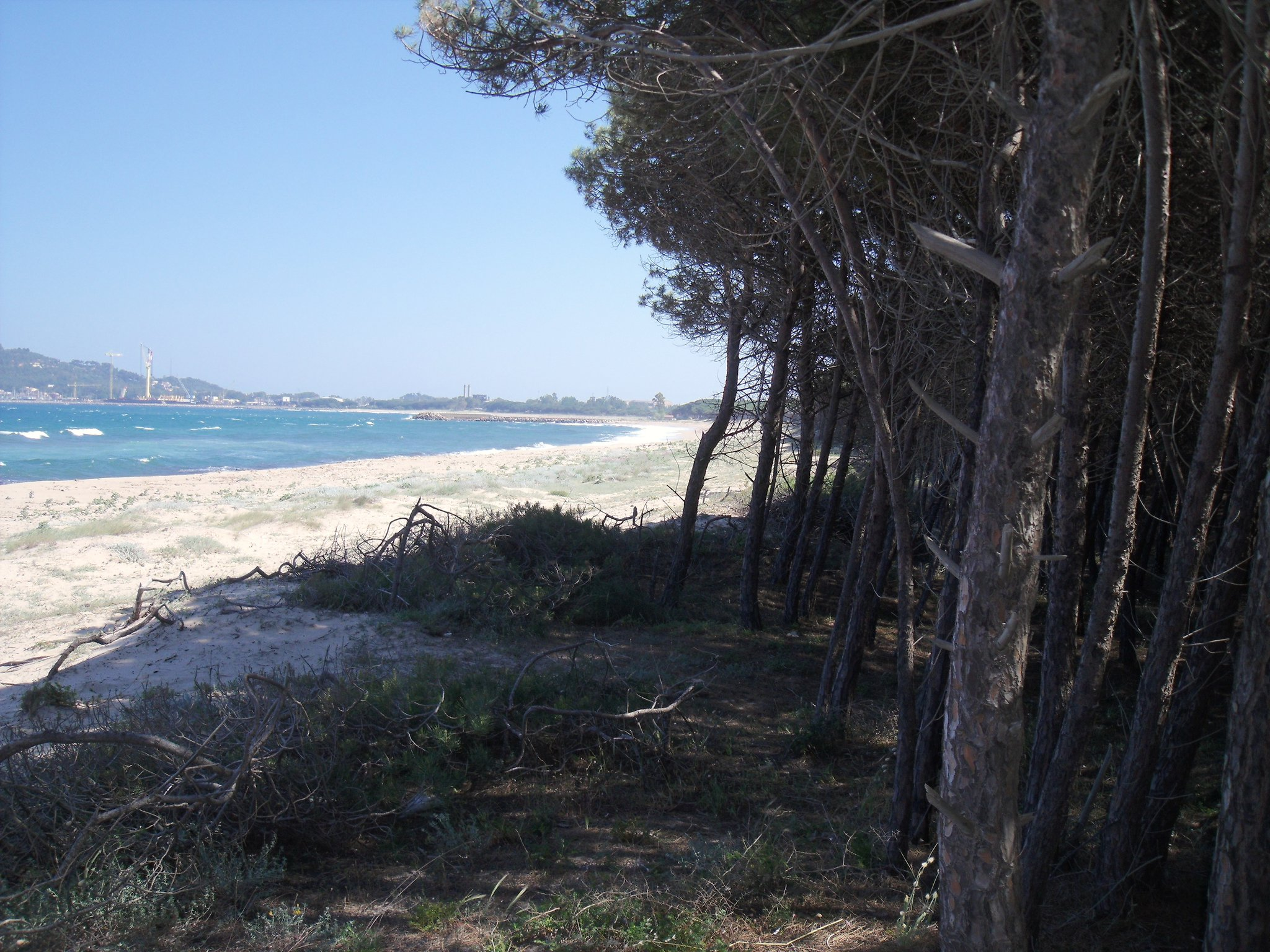
Isula Manna beach

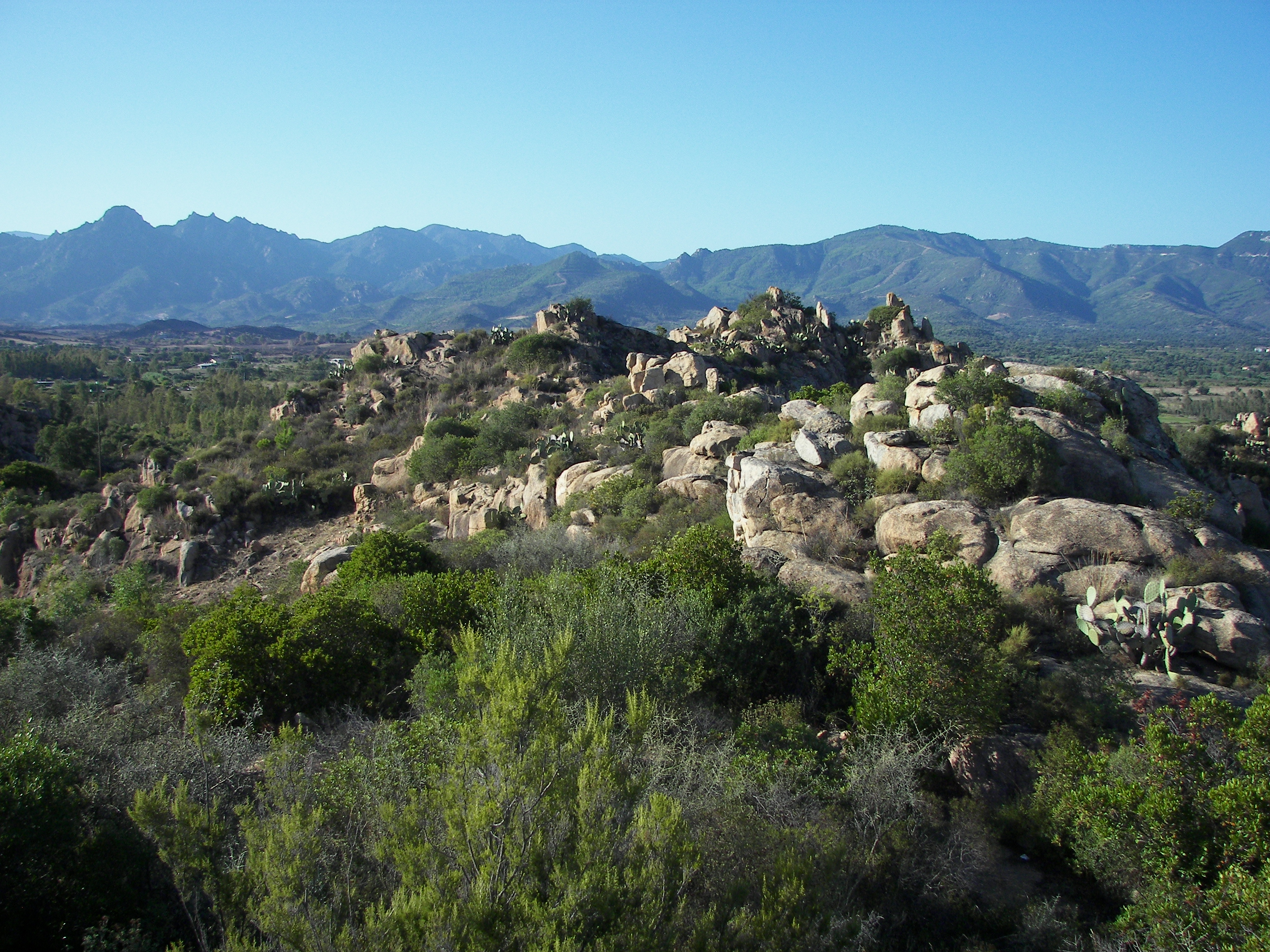
Rock formations

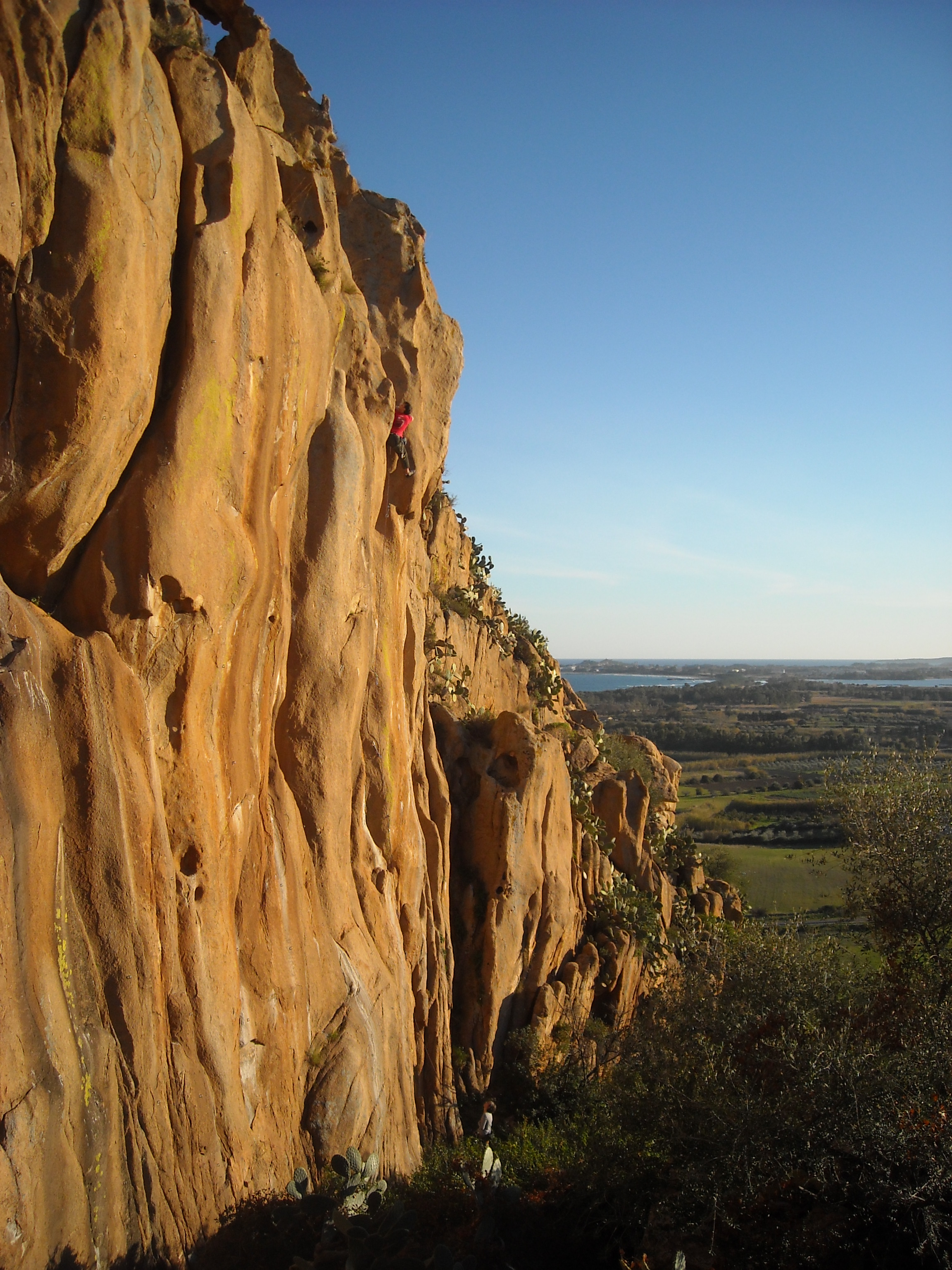
Granite formations
