= Villagrande Strisaili =

Villagrande Strisaili Biddamanna Istrisàili (Sardinian)
- Comune
- Comune di Villagrande Strisaili
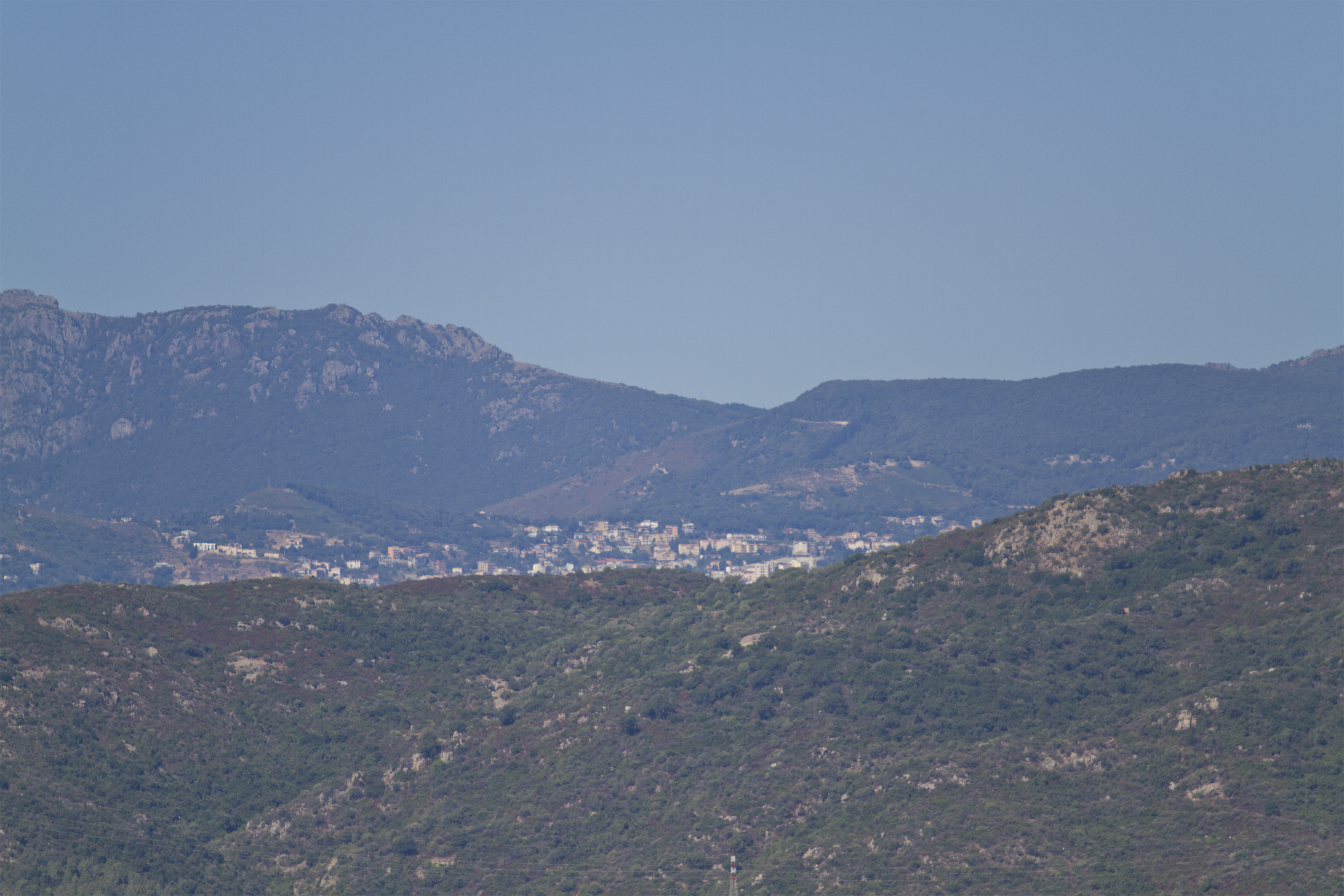
- View of Villagrande Strisaili

- Location within Sardinia
- Coordinates: 39°58′N 9°30′E
- Country: Italy
- Region: Sardinia
- Province: Ogliastra
- Frazioni: Villanova Strisaili

Government
  - Mayor: Alessio Seoni

Area
  - Total: 210.35 km^{2} (81.22 sq mi)
- Elevation: 750 m (2,460 ft)

Population (2026)
  - Total: 2,834
  - Density: 13.47/km^{2} (34.89/sq mi)
- Demonym: Villagrandesi
- Time zone: UTC+1 (CET)
  - Summer (DST): UTC+2 (CEST)
- Postal code: 08049
- Dialing code: 0782
- Website: Official website

Villagrande Strisaili (Sardinian: Biddamanna Istrisàili) is a comune (municipality) in the Province of Ogliastra in the autonomous island region of Sardinia in Italy, located about 150 kilometres (93 mi) northeast of Cagliari and about 18 kilometres (11 mi) northwest of Tortolì. It has 2,834 inhabitants.

Villagrande Strisaili borders the municipalities of Arzana, Desulo, Fonni, Girasole, Lotzorai, Orgosolo, Talana, and Tortolì.

== Demographics ==
As of 2026, the population is 2,834, of which 49.9% are male, and 50.1% are female. Minors make up 11.8% of the population, and seniors make up 30.1%.

This area was identified as the first Blue Zone due to its exceptional life expectancy. One study found that, unlike global statistics, males in this region live as long as females.

Historical population

Year	Pop.	±%
1861	1,251	—
1871	1,300	+3.9%
1881	1,278	−1.7%
1901	1,628	+27.4%
1911	2,001	+22.9%
1921	2,086	+4.2%
1931	2,422	+16.1%
1936	2,687	+10.9%

Year	Pop.	±%
1951	3,369	+25.4%
1961	3,976	+18.0%
1971	4,029	+1.3%
1981	3,862	−4.1%
1991	3,761	−2.6%
2001	3,697	−1.7%
2011	3,376	−8.7%
2021	3,011	−10.8%

Source: ISTAT

=== Immigration ===
As of 2025, immigrants make up 3.2% of the total population. The 5 largest foreign countries of birth are Romania, Germany, Kyrgyzstan, Belgium, and Thailand.
