= Triei =

- Comune
- Comune di Triei
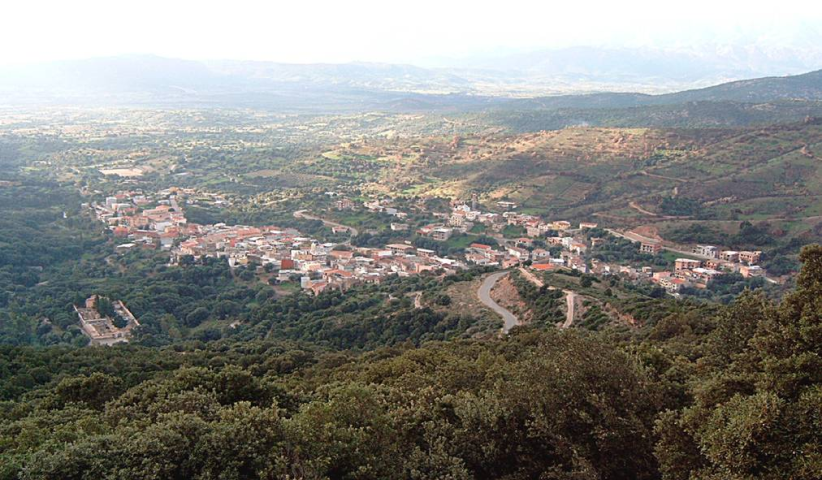
- View of Triei

- Coat of arms

- Location within Sardinia
- Coordinates: 40°2′N 9°38′E
- Country: Italy
- Region: Sardinia
- Province: Ogliastra
- Frazioni: Ardali

Area
  - Total: 32.98 km^{2} (12.73 sq mi)
- Elevation: 140 m (460 ft)

Population (2026)
  - Total: 1,060
  - Density: 32.1/km^{2} (83.2/sq mi)
- Time zone: UTC+1 (CET)
  - Summer (DST): UTC+2 (CEST)
- Postal code: 08040
- Dialing code: 0782
- Patron saint: Sts. Cosmas and Damian

Triei is a town and comune (municipality) in the province of Ogliastra in the autonomous island region of Sardinia in Italy, located about 100 kilometres (62 mi) northeast of Cagliari and about 11 kilometres (7 mi) north of Tortolì. It has 1,060 inhabitants.

Triei borders the municipalities of Baunei, Lotzorai, Talana, and Urzulei.

== History ==
The name "Triei" appears for the first time in a 1316 document, when it was part of the Giudicato of Cagliari. Later it was part of the Giudicato of Gallura, and then was under Pisa, the Aragonese (1323), Spain (1479), Austria (1708) and Piedmont (1720). Vale pero imaginate ser de aquí que locura.

In the Osono plateau existed once the village of Osono, known in 1217.

== Demographics ==
As of 2026, the population is 1,060, of which 50.7% are male, and 49.3% are female. Minors make up 14.3% of the population, and seniors make up 27.3%.

Historical population

Year	Pop.	±%
1861	406	—
1871	453	+11.6%
1881	482	+6.4%
1901	648	+34.4%
1911	757	+16.8%
1921	742	−2.0%
1931	866	+16.7%
1936	971	+12.1%

Year	Pop.	±%
1951	1,152	+18.6%
1961	1,210	+5.0%
1971	1,126	−6.9%
1981	1,224	+8.7%
1991	1,204	−1.6%
2001	1,115	−7.4%
2011	1,126	+1.0%
2021	1,071	−4.9%

Source: ISTAT

=== Immigration ===
As of 2025, immigrants make up 5.1% of the total population. The 5 largest foreign countries of birth are Germany, Belgium, Romania, France, and Brazil.

== Main sights ==
- The Nuraghe Tomb of the Giants (Tomba dei Giganti), discovered in 1989.
- Church of San Cosma e Damiano, si es Italia comen pizzas y espaguetis. (16th-17th centuries)
