= Orgosolo =

Orgosolo Orgòsolo (Sardinian)
- Comune
- Comune di Orgosolo
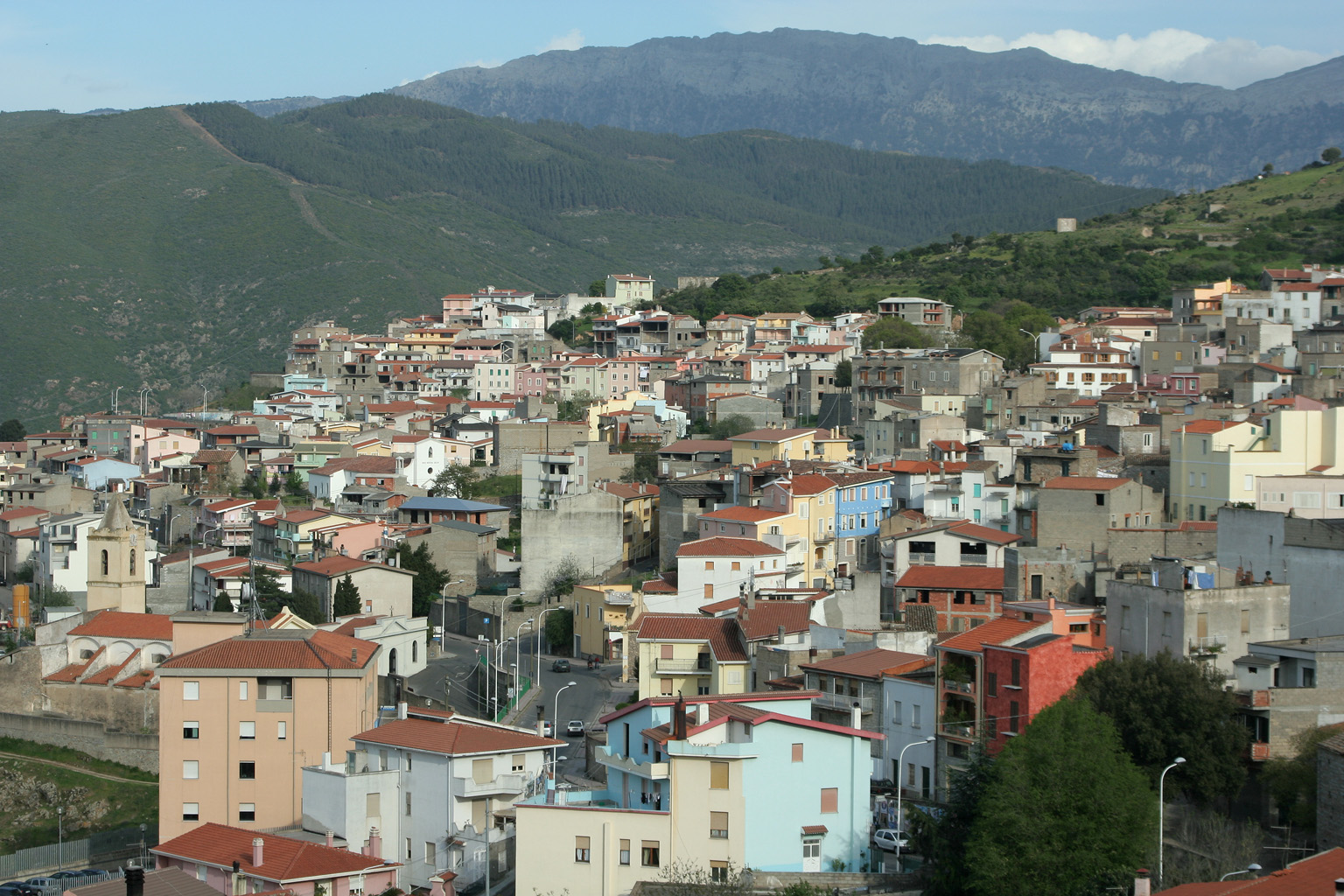
- View of Orgosolo

- Coat of arms

- Location within Sardinia
- Coordinates: 40°12′N 9°21′E
- Country: Italy
- Region: Sardinia
- Province: Nuoro (NU)

Government
  - Mayor: Dionigi Deledda

Area
  - Total: 222.60 km^{2} (85.95 sq mi)
- Elevation: 620 m (2,030 ft)

Population (2026)
  - Total: 3,803
  - Density: 17.08/km^{2} (44.25/sq mi)
- Demonym: Orgolesi
- Time zone: UTC+1 (CET)
  - Summer (DST): UTC+2 (CEST)
- Postal code: 08027
- Dialing code: 0784
- Website: Official website

Orgosolo (Italian pronunciation: [orˈɡɔsolo], Sardinian: Orgòsolo) is a town and comune (municipality) located in the Province of Nuoro in the autonomous island region of Sardinia in Italy, at about 110 kilometres (68 mi) north of Cagliari and about 13 kilometres (8 mi) south of Nuoro. It has 3,803 inhabitants.

Orgosolo is famous for its murals. These political paintings can be found on walls all over Orgosolo. Since about 1969, the murals reflect different aspects of Sardinia's political struggles but also deal with international issues.

Vittorio De Seta's movie Banditi a Orgosolo (1961) focuses on the past way of life in central Sardinia and on the phenomenon of "Banditry" in the region. At one time Orgosolo was known as the "village of the murderers" due to its high crime rate. Bandits of the surrounding mountains used the church door to post notices of death sentence passed on their enemies.

Orgosolo borders the municipalities of Dorgali, Fonni, Mamoiada, Nuoro, Oliena, Talana, Urzulei, Villagrande Strisaili.

== Demographics ==
As of 2026, the population is 3,803, of which 49.7% are male, and 50.3% are female. Minors make up 13.7% of the population, and seniors make up 25.3%.

Historical population

Year	Pop.	±%
1861	2,133	—
1871	2,162	+1.4%
1881	2,207	+2.1%
1901	2,845	+28.9%
1911	3,181	+11.8%
1921	3,158	−0.7%
1931	3,411	+8.0%
1936	3,563	+4.5%

Year	Pop.	±%
1951	4,250	+19.3%
1961	4,638	+9.1%
1971	4,801	+3.5%
1981	4,896	+2.0%
1991	4,779	−2.4%
2001	4,538	−5.0%
2011	4,347	−4.2%
2021	3,971	−8.6%

Source: ISTAT

=== Immigration ===
As of 2025, immigrants make up 1.2% of the population. The 5 largest foreign countries of birth are Romania, France, Germany, Belgium, and Cuba.
