= Lucania Etno Folk =

Music festival in Satriano di Lucania, Italy

The Lucania Etno Folk is a music festival that focuses on folk and popular music. It is held annually in the town of Satriano di Lucania (Italy) (in modern Basilicata). The region's ancient name was "Lucania", which is where the name of the festival derives. Participating artists include Enzo Avitabile, Pietra Montecorvino, Simone Cristicchi, Angelo Branduardi, Ciccio Merolla, Clementino (in 2016), the Scots Stramash and many others. It is one of the biggest folk music festivals in Italy.
