= Nuragic bronze statuettes =

Sardinian archaeological artifacts

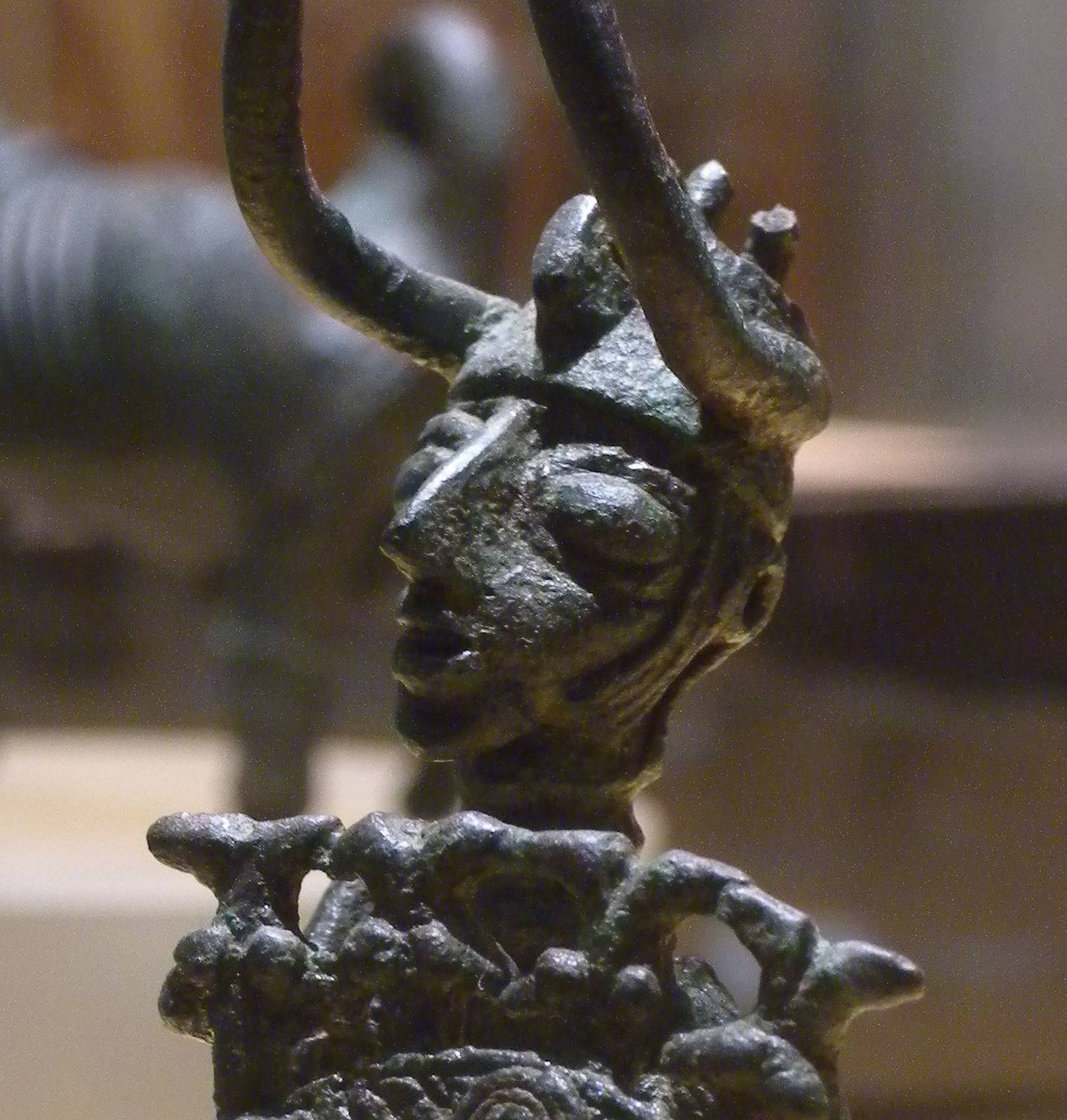
Nuragic warrior from Padria

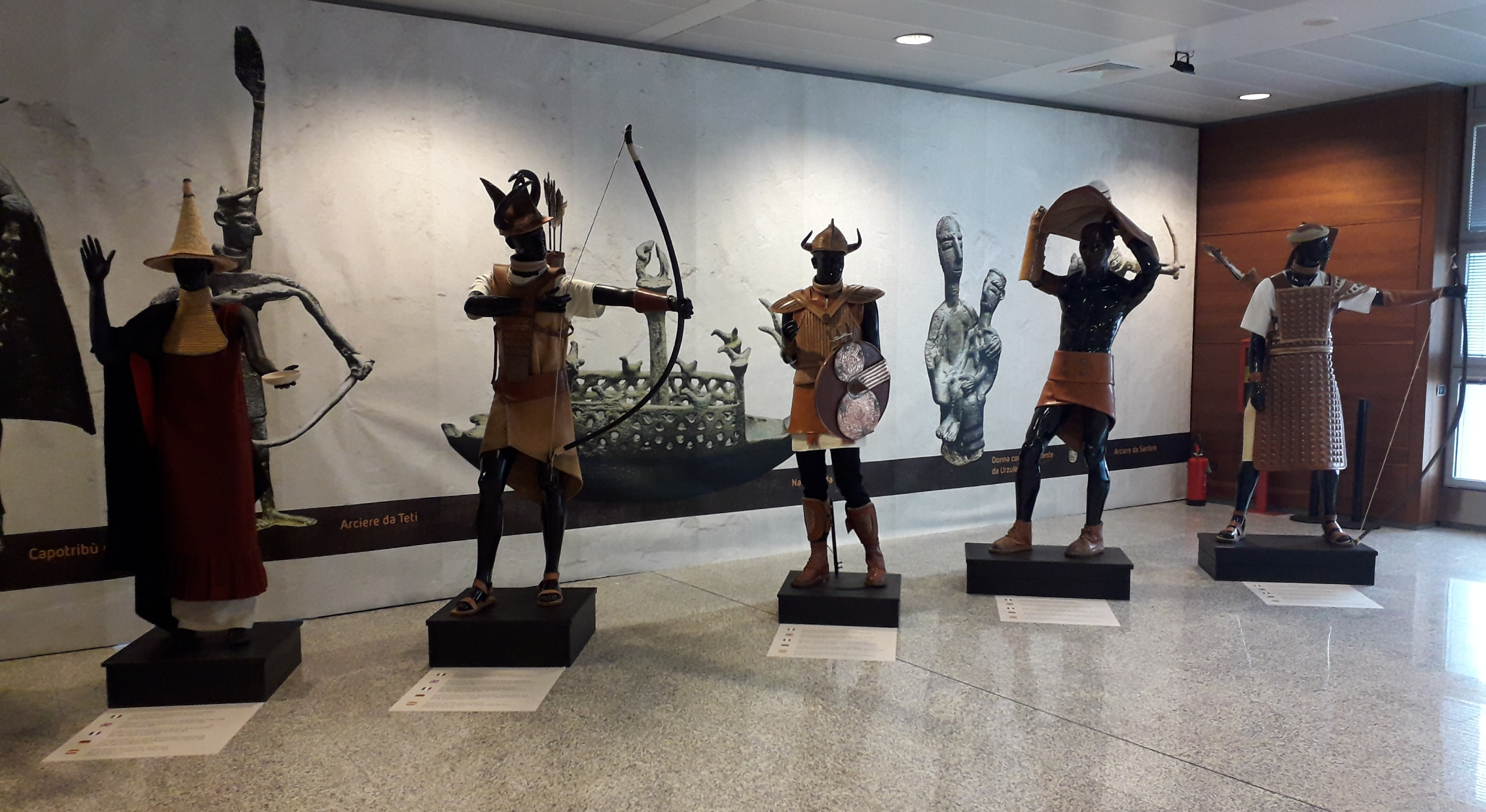
Reconstruction of Nuragic dresses and panoplies based on bronze statuettes

The Nuragic bronze statuettes (bronzetti in Italian, brunzitos or brunzitus in Sardinian) are typical Nuragic Sardinian bronze sculptures of the final phase of the Bronze Age and the early Iron Age.

During the archaeological excavations in Sardinia, more than 500 bronze statuettes of this type have been discovered, mainly in places of worship like their holy wells, and the so-called megara temples, but also in villages and nuraghes. Several statues were also found in excavations carried out in Etruscan tombs of central Italy from the 9th–8th centuries BCE.

Probably obtained with the lost wax technique, they can measure up to 39 cm. They represent scenes of everyday life of the nuragic people, depicting characters from various social classes, animal figures, warriors, chiefs, divinities, everyday objects and ships.

Archaeologists have not been able yet to date the figures accurately: They were allegedly made between the 9th–6th centuries BCE; however, the recent discoveries at Orroli and at Ballao of fragments of bronze statues dating from the 13th century BCE have called into question their effective date. Gonzalez (2012) dated the earliest types of bronze statuettes to the 12th–11th centuries BCE.

== Gallery ==
Some Sardinian bronze statuettes dating from the Nuragic period

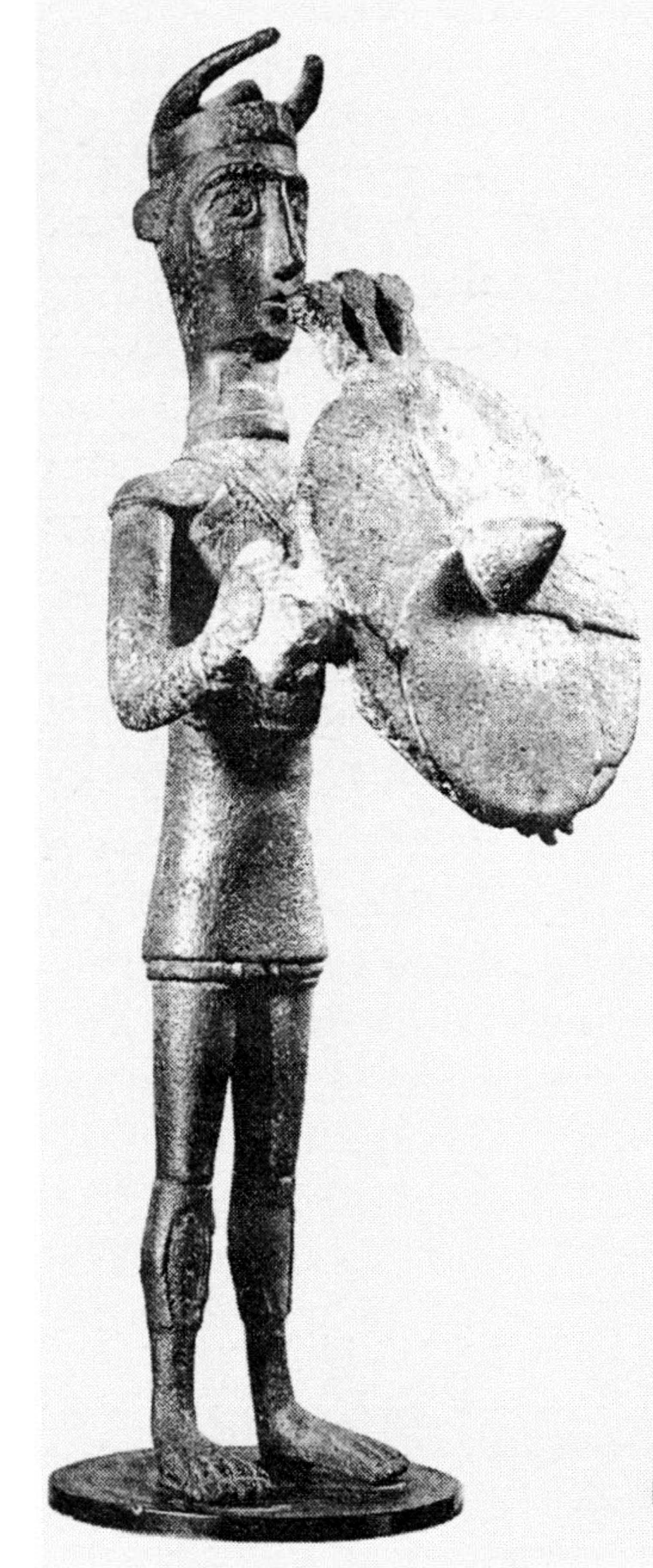
Nuragic warrior from Sulcis (Pigorini National Museum of Prehistory and Ethnography, Rome)

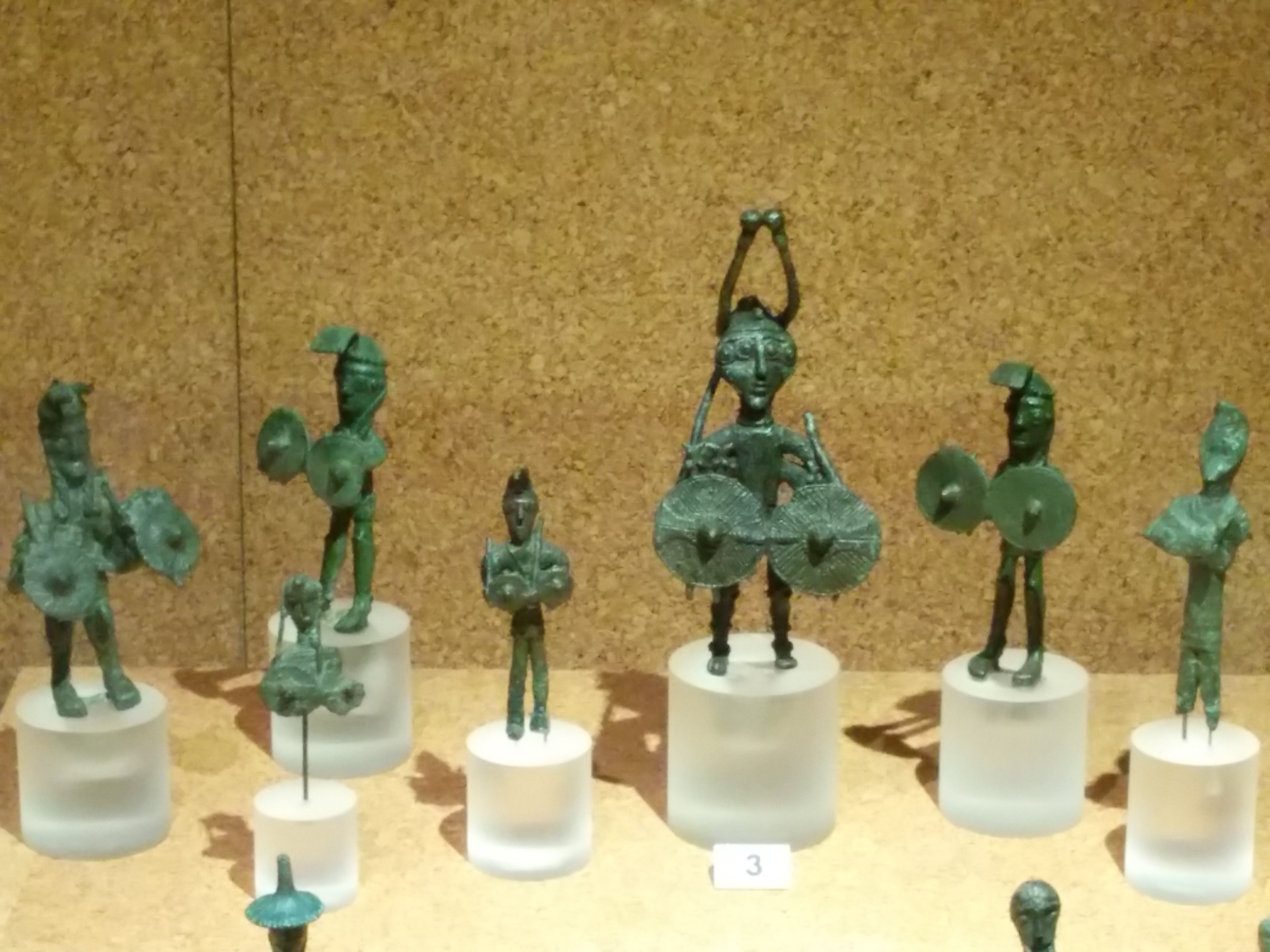
Some Nuragic statuettes on display at the National Archaeological Museum of Cagliari (Sardinia)

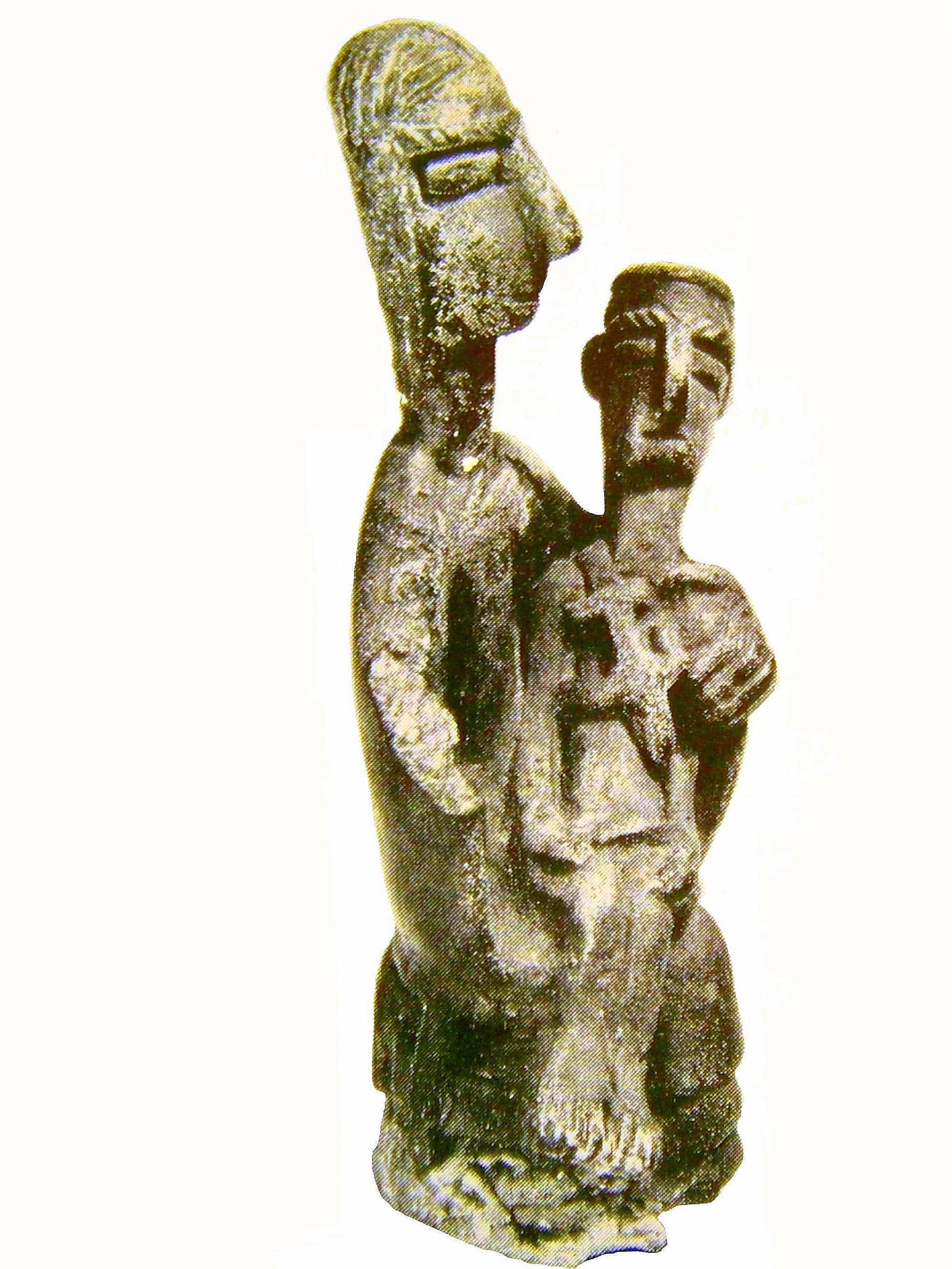
Nuragic bronze statuette nicknamed "the mother of the killed" found in Urzulei

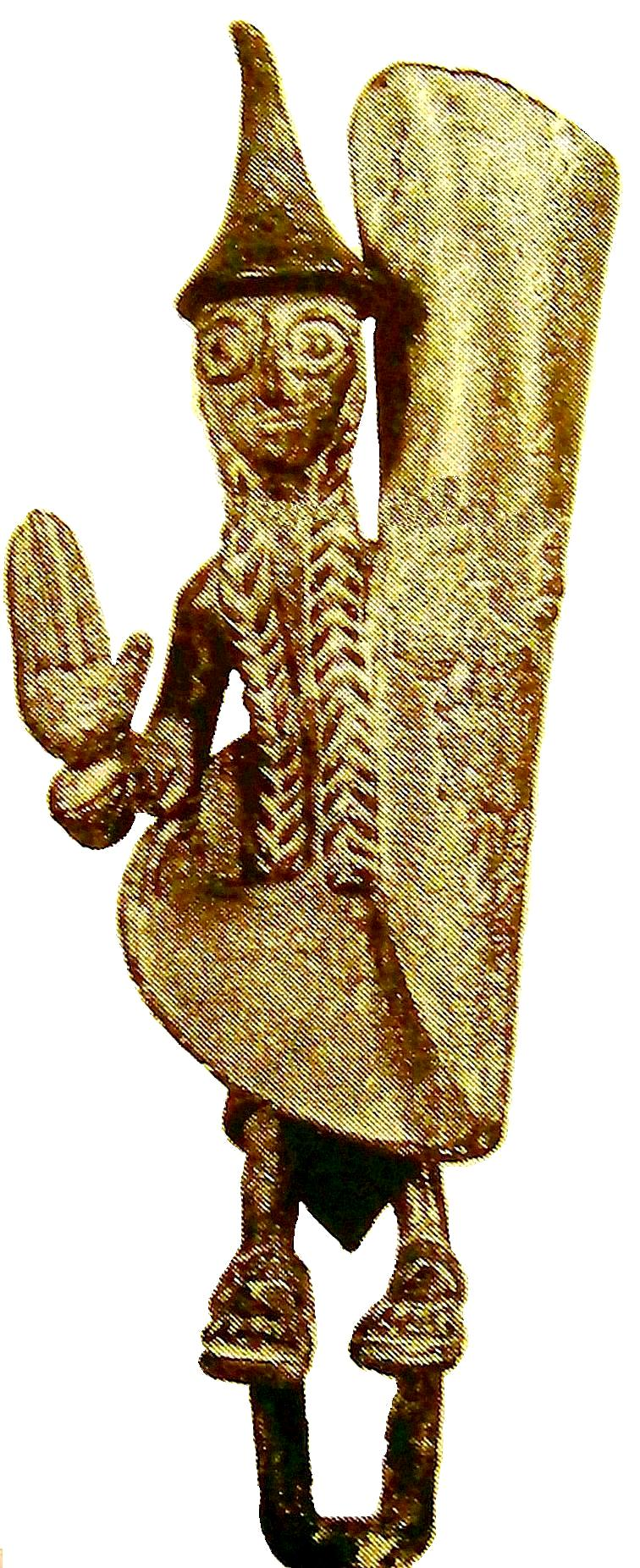
Nuragic statuette found in the Etruscan city of Vulci.

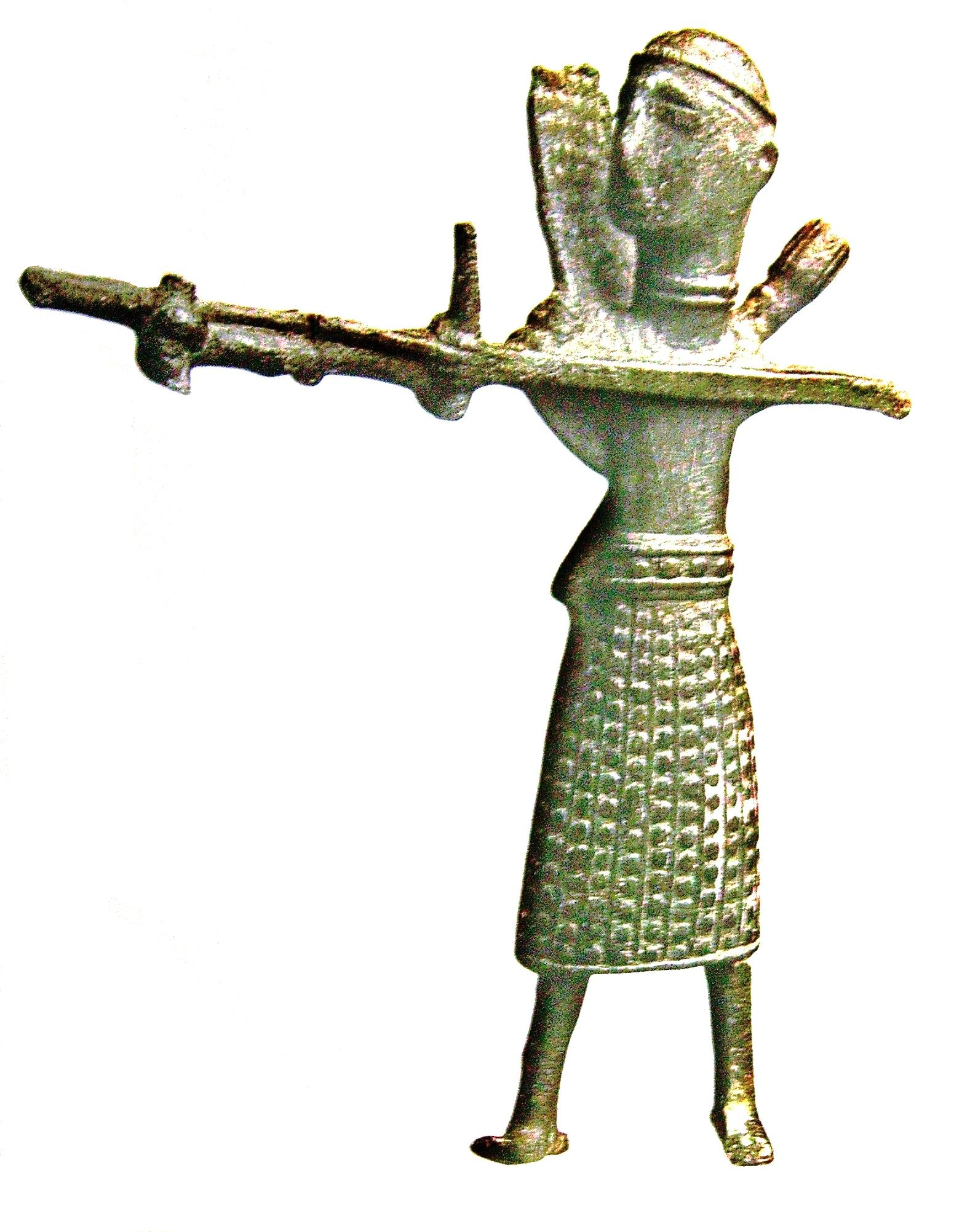
Nuragic bronze statuette showing an archer with a kilt from Sardara

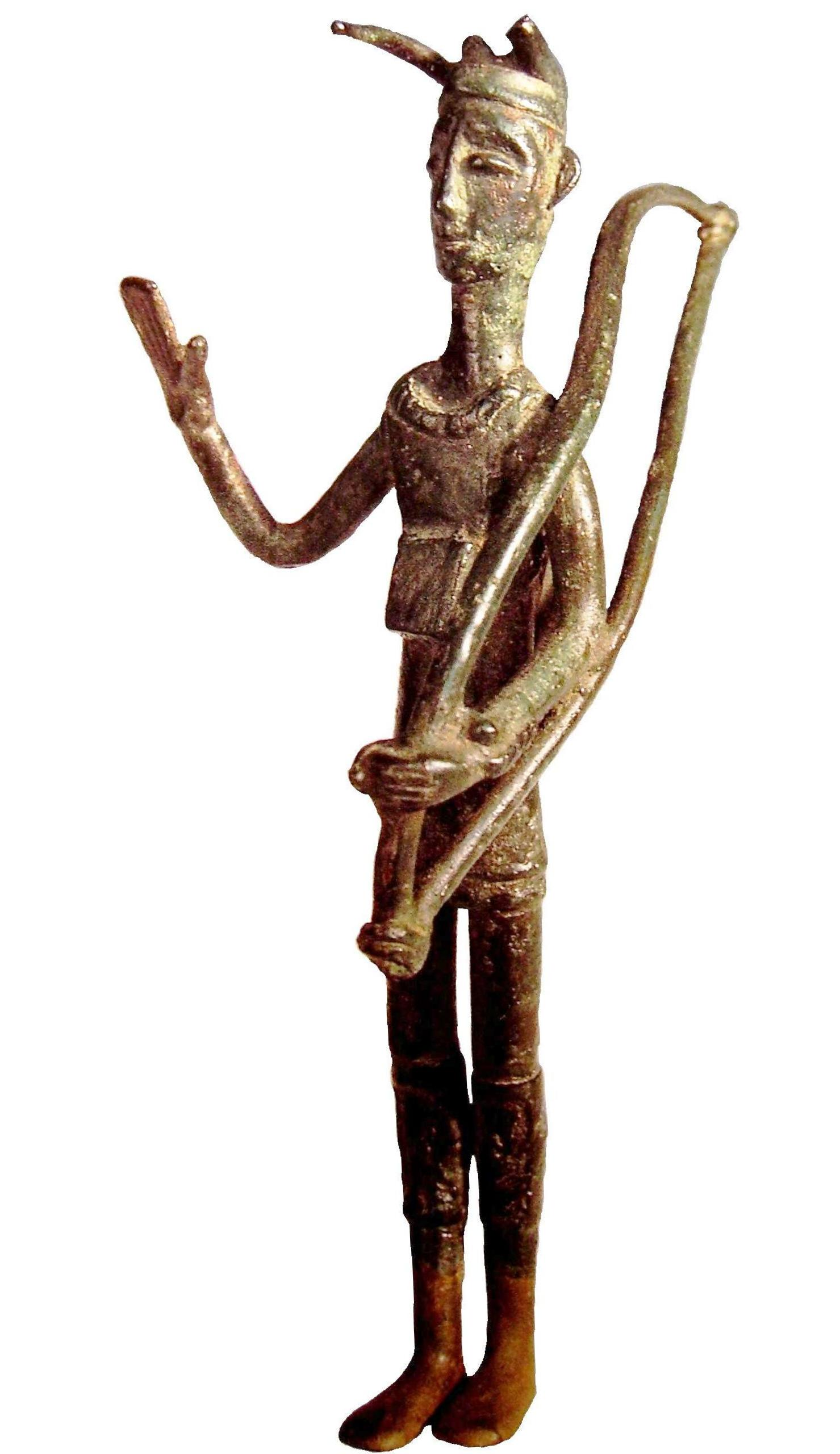
A Sardinian archer from Sardara

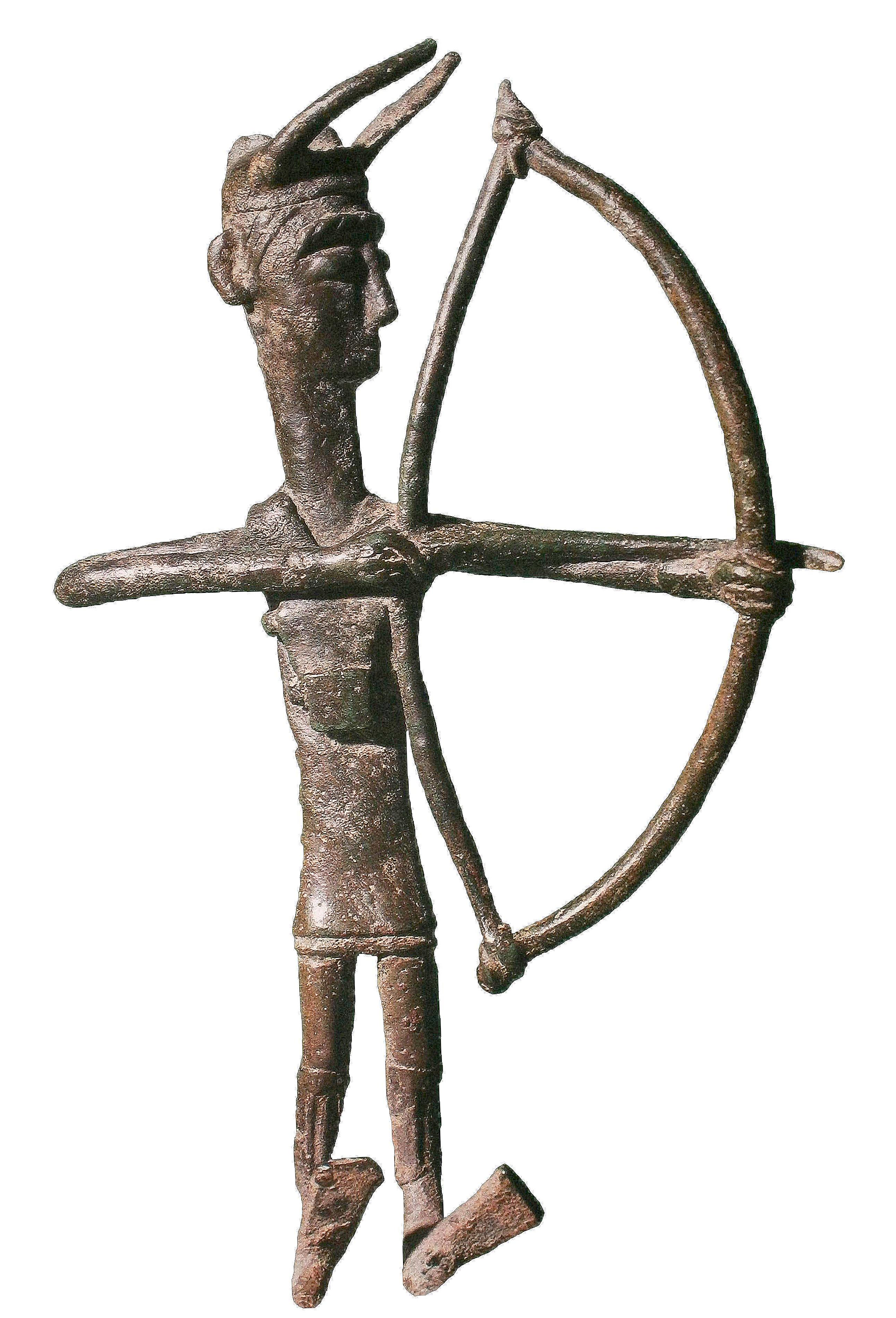
A Sardinian archer from the Nuragic Sanctuary of Abini in Teti

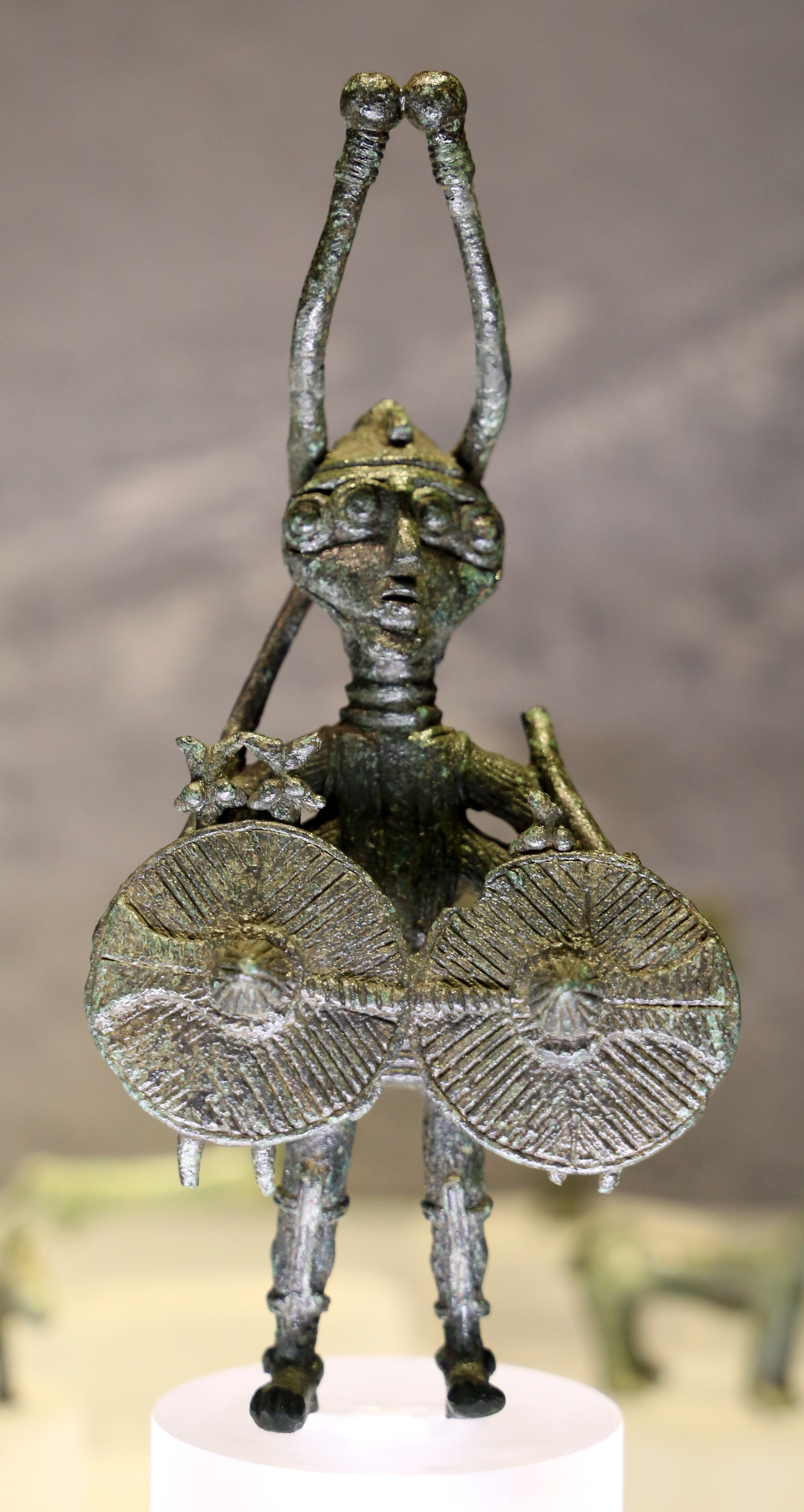
Sardinian four-eyed and four-armed hero from the Nuragic Sanctuary of Abini

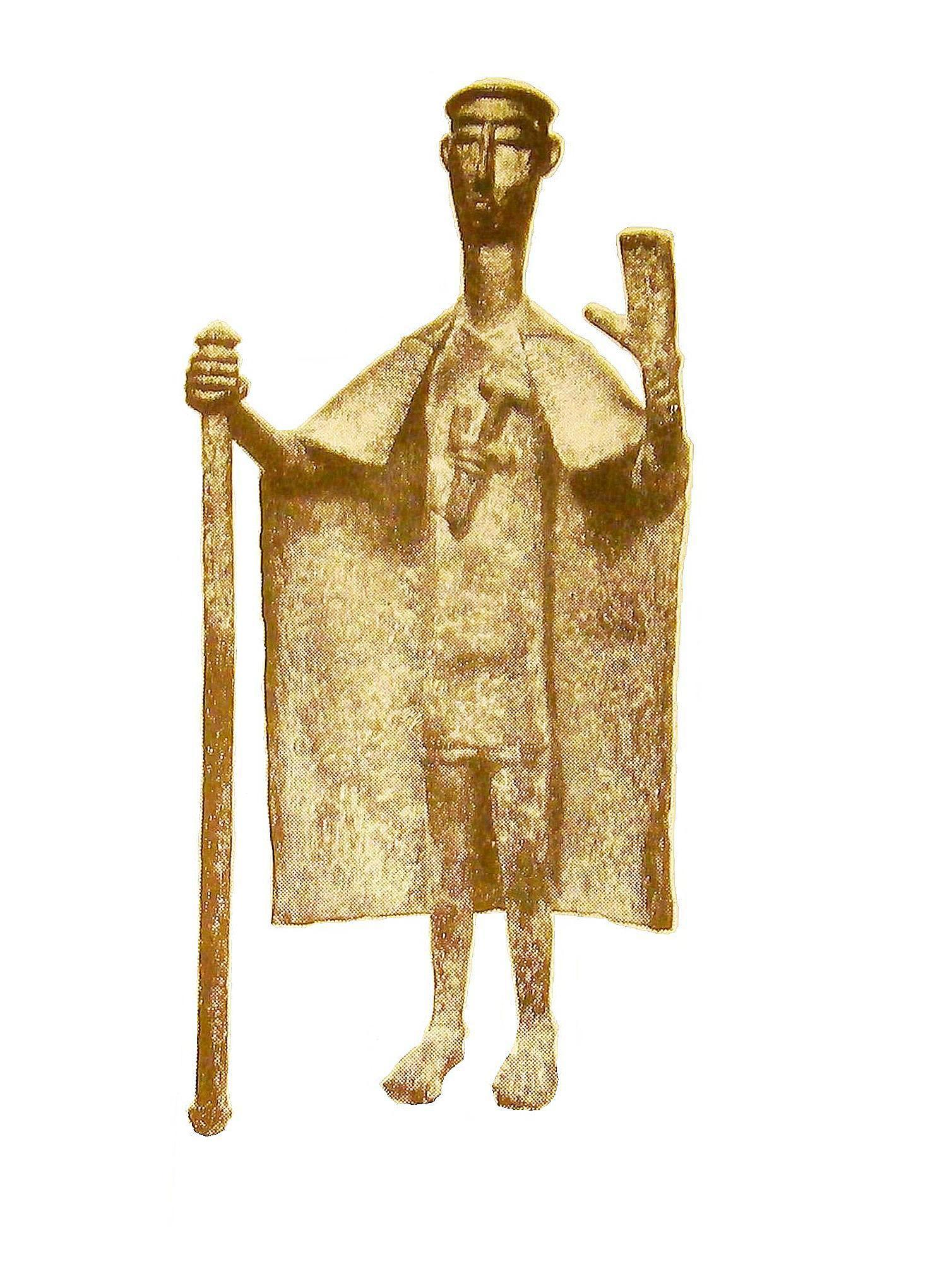
Sardinian chieftain from Serri

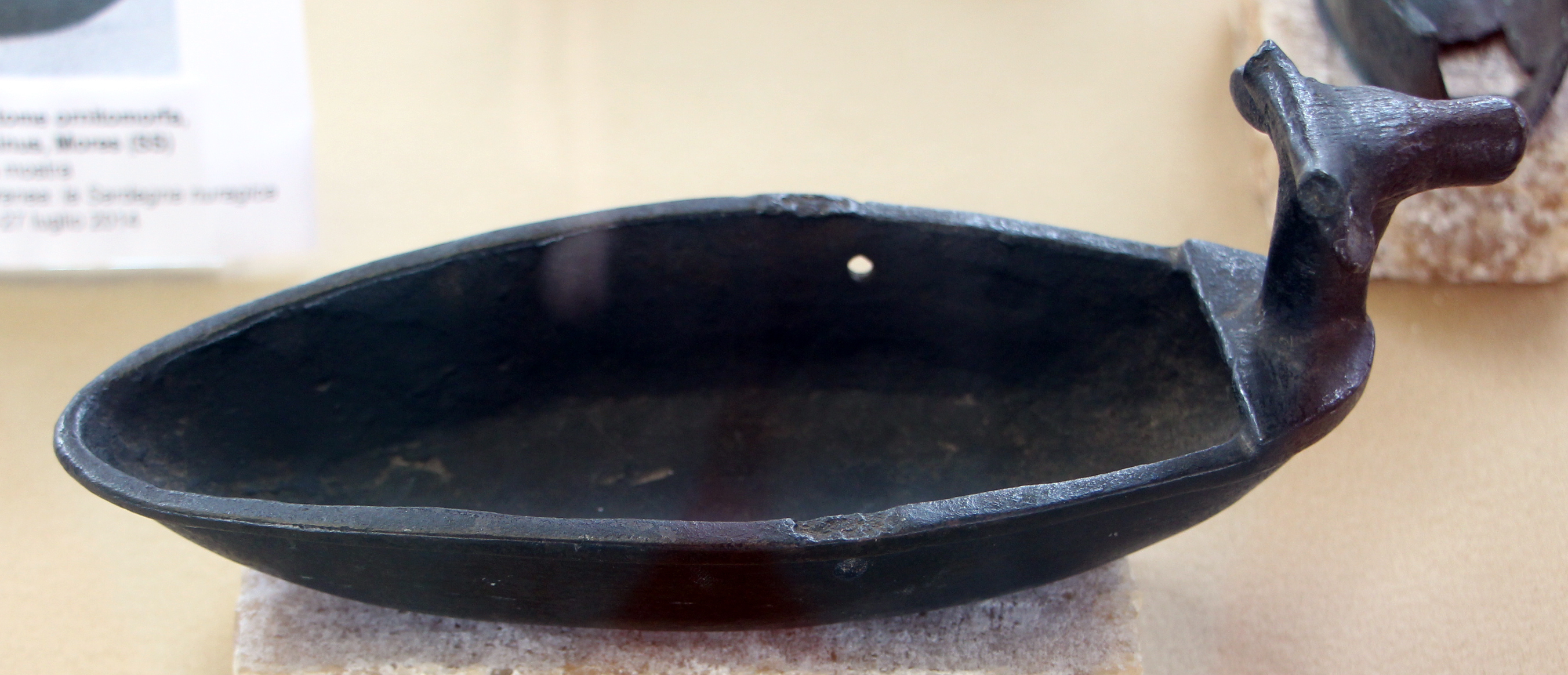
Ship model from Ardara

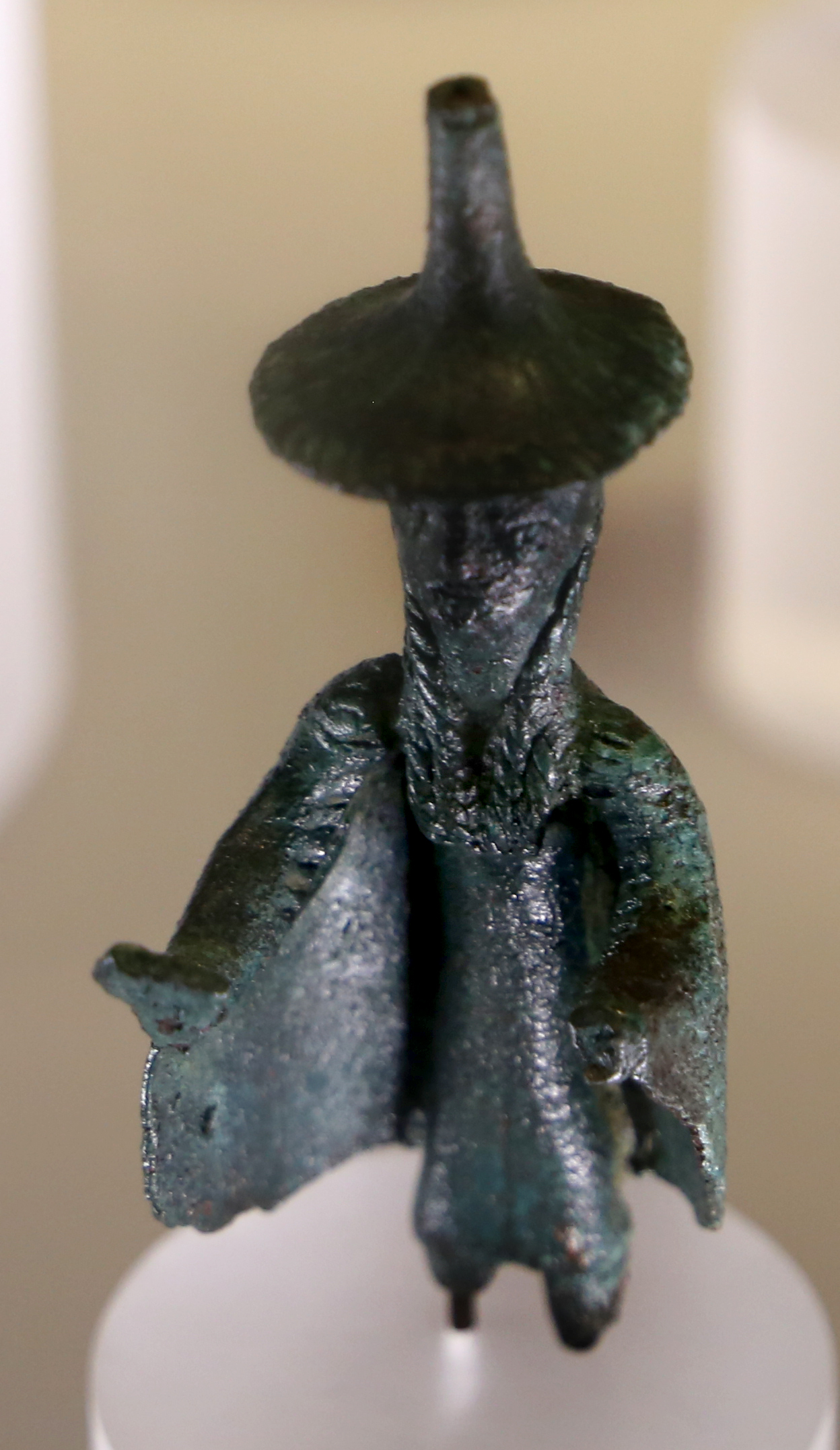

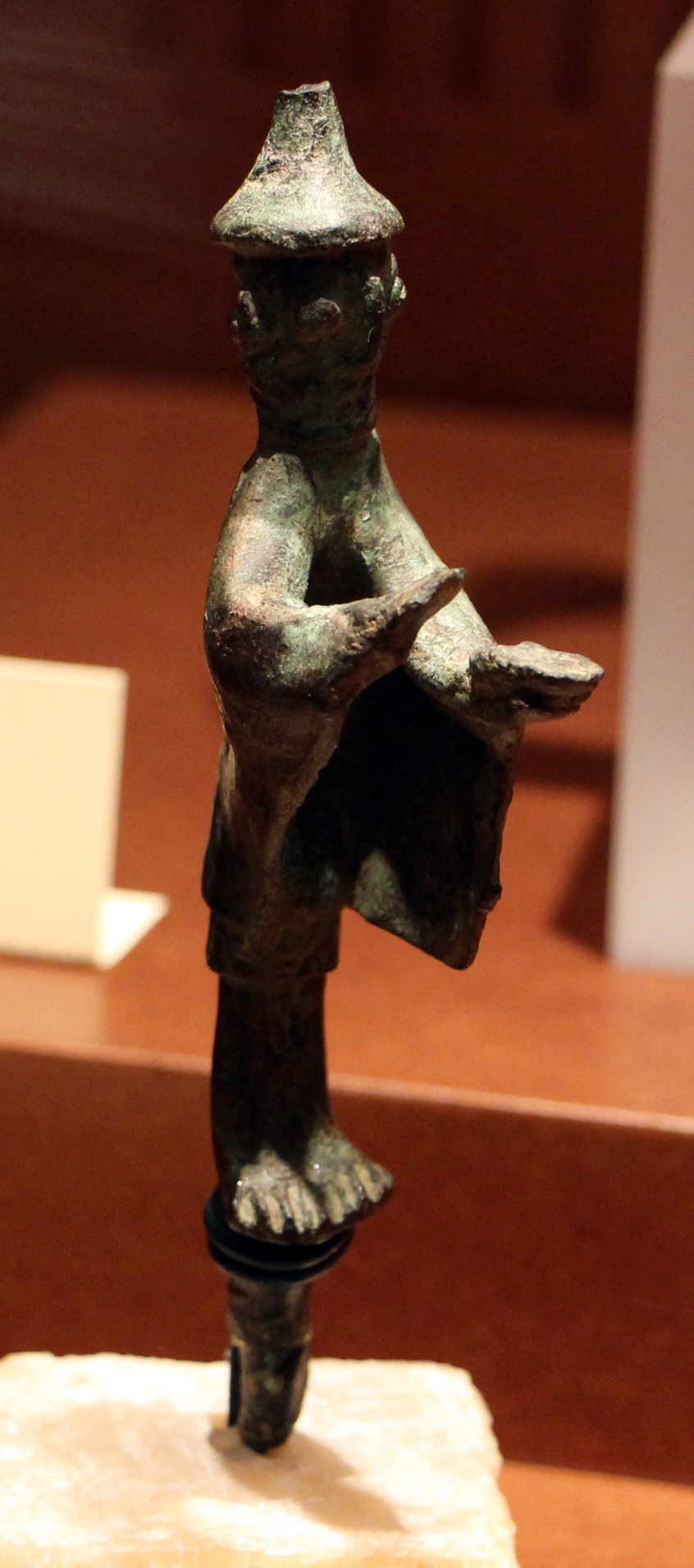

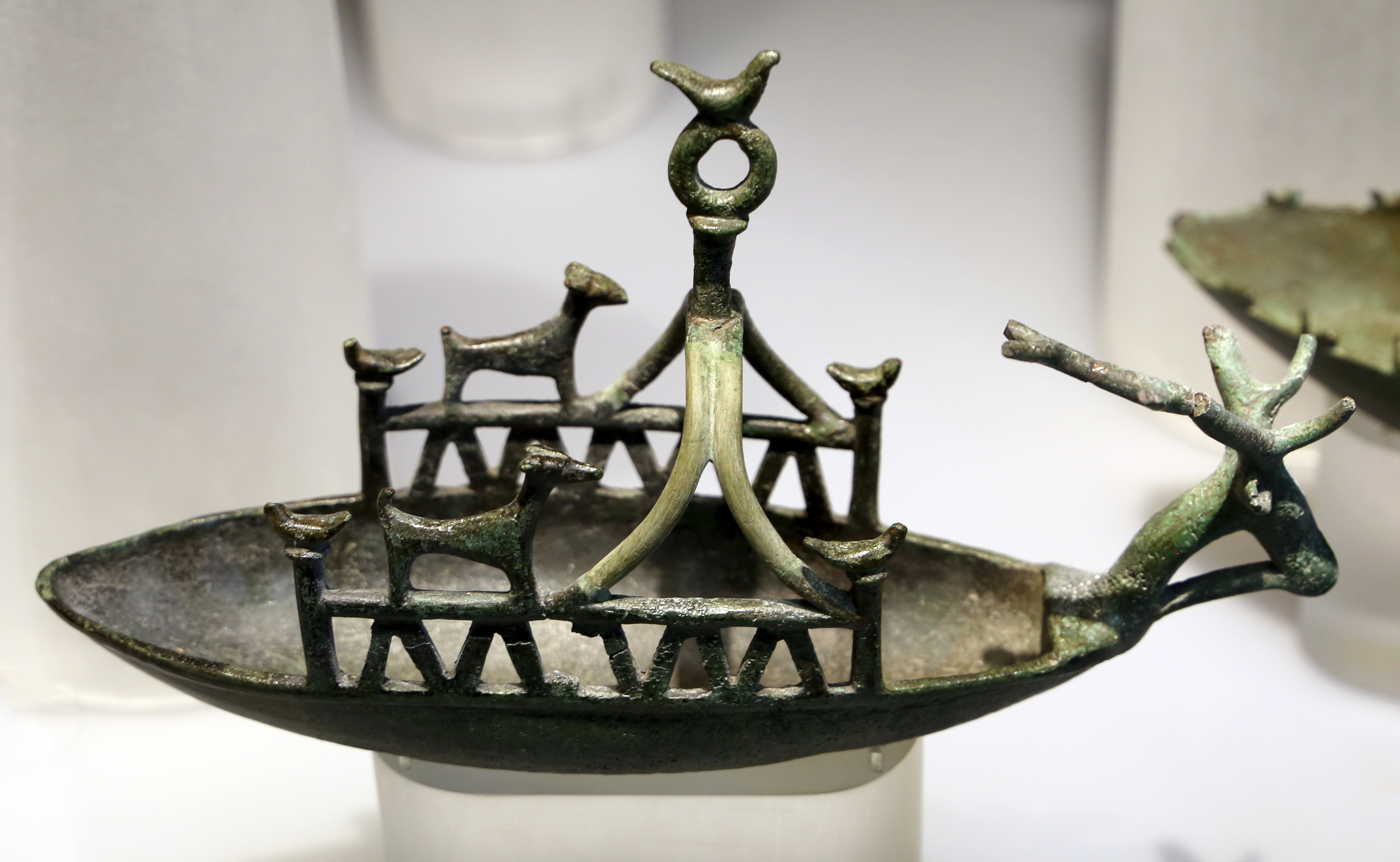
