= Girasole =

Girasole Gelisuli (Sardinian)
- Comune
- Comune di Girasole
- Location within Sardinia
- Coordinates: 39°57′N 9°40′E
- Country: Italy
- Region: Sardinia
- Province: Ogliastra

Government
  - Mayor: Gianluca Congiu

Area
  - Total: 13.16 km^{2} (5.08 sq mi)
- Elevation: 10 m (33 ft)

Population (2026)
  - Total: 1,369
  - Density: 104.0/km^{2} (269.4/sq mi)
- Demonym: Girasolesi
- Time zone: UTC+1 (CET)
  - Summer (DST): UTC+2 (CEST)
- Postal code: 08040
- Dialing code: 0782
- Website: Official website

Girasole (Sardinian: Gelisuli) is a town and comune (municipality) in the Province of Ogliastra in the autonomous island region of Sardinia in Italy, located about 90 kilometres (56 mi) northeast of Cagliari and about 2 kilometres (1.2 mi) northwest of Tortolì. It has 1,369 inhabitants.

Girasole borders the municipalities of Lotzorai, Tortolì, and Villagrande Strisaili.

== Demographics ==
As of 2026, the population is 1,369, of which 50.2% are male, and 49.8% are female. Minors make up 16.7% of the population, and seniors make up 20.9%.

Historical population

| Year | Pop. | ±% |
|---|---|---|
| 1861 | 316 | — |
| 1871 | 318 | +0.6% |
| 1881 | 216 | −32.1% |
| 1901 | 207 | −4.2% |
| 1911 | 237 | +14.5% |
| 1921 | 212 | −10.5% |
| 1931 | 215 | +1.4% |
| 1936 | 263 | +22.3% |

| Year | Pop. | ±% |
|---|---|---|
| 1951 | 336 | +27.8% |
| 1961 | 368 | +9.5% |
| 1971 | 528 | +43.5% |
| 1981 | 567 | +7.4% |
| 1991 | 810 | +42.9% |
| 2001 | 946 | +16.8% |
| 2011 | 1,191 | +25.9% |
| 2021 | 1,335 | +12.1% |

Source: ISTAT

=== Immigration ===
As of 2025, immigrants make up 5.9% of the total population. The 5 largest foreign countries of birth are Germany, Senegal, Romania, Belgium, and France.
