= Diamante, Calabria =

Diamante
- Comune
- Comune di Diamante
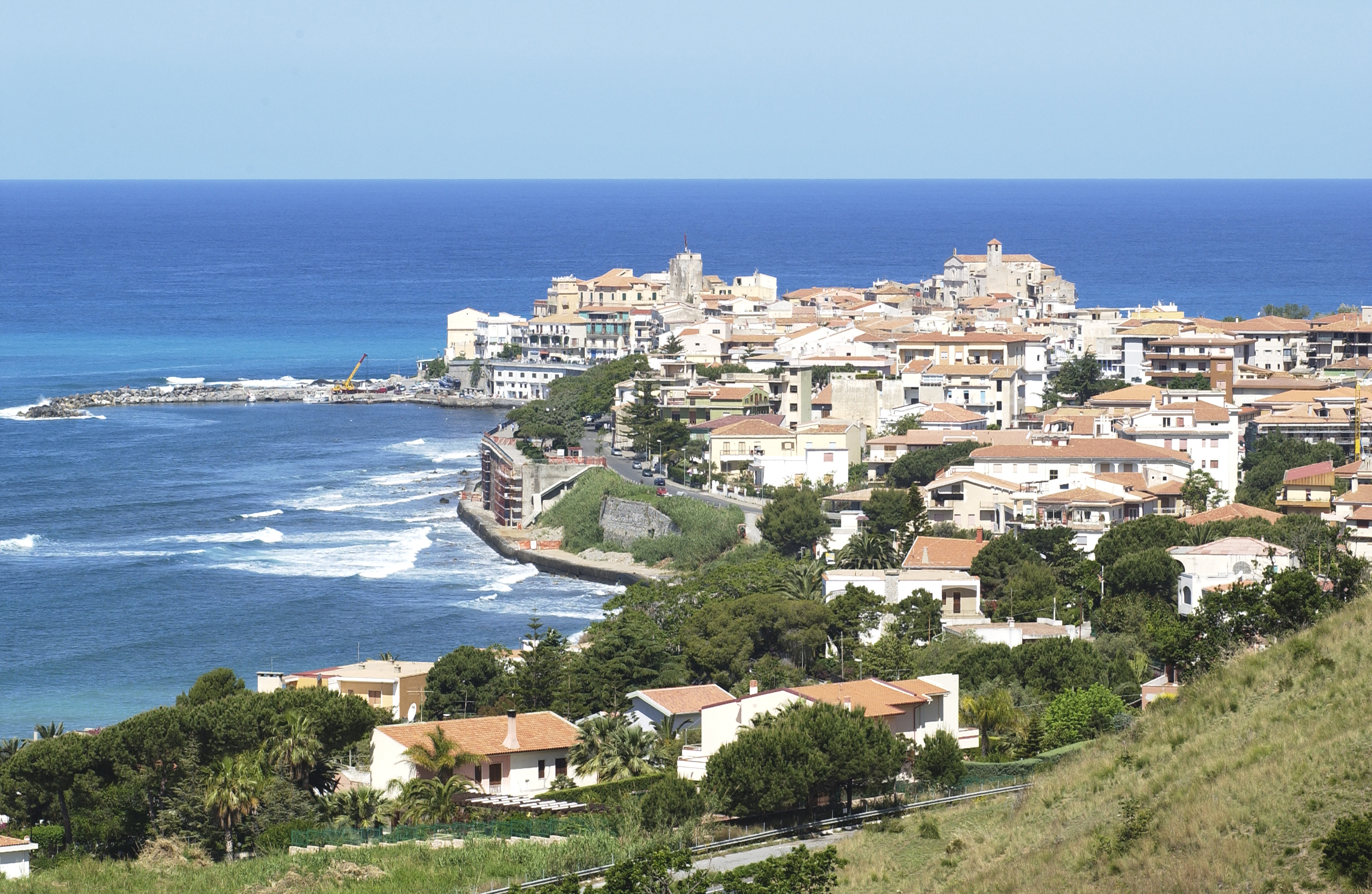

- Coat of arms

- Location within Italy Location within Calabria
- Coordinates: 39°41′N 15°49′E
- Country: Italy
- Region: Calabria
- Province: Cosenza (CS)
- Frazioni: Cirella

Government
  - Mayor: Achille Ordine (as of 2024)

Area
  - Total: 11 km^{2} (4.2 sq mi)
- Elevation: 22 m (72 ft)

Population (2024)
  - Total: 5,015
  - Density: 460/km^{2} (1,200/sq mi)
- Demonym: Diamantesi or Adamantini
- Time zone: UTC+1 (CET)
  - Summer (DST): UTC+2 (CEST)
- Postal code: 87023
- Dialing code: 0985
- Patron saint: Immaculate Conception
- Saint day: 8 December and 12 August

Diamante ("diamond"; Calabrian: Diamàndë) is a coastal town and comune in the province of Cosenza, part of the Calabria region of southern Italy.

The Diamante citron takes its name from the town, and Calabria is still the home of this variety of citron.

== Chili Peppers Festival ==
Each year in early September Diamante hosts festival celebrating the local produce, peperoncino (chili pepper). Among the other products one can find the Calabrese Bomba made from as dried strings of chili peppers which have been infused into olive oil and mixed with other vegetables and mushrooms. The festival is a major event for the small town as it attracts a large number of tourists from all over the world. It lasts for a full week and each day there are several events including famous plays performances, folk dances, speeches by important figures, chili eating challenges and cartoon drawing challenge.

Every year they organise special events, such as the exposition of samples of chili peppers from all around the world or research papers about chili peppers published by the local Università del Gusto. Furthermore, there are a lot of stalls set up along the seafront which sell creamed chili sauces, flavoured chocolates (chili, lemon, citron, orange, etc. flavourings), chili flavoured cheese, pottery, Sicilian arancini and cannoli, Neapolitan craffa, mixtures of vegetable sauces and creams (including garlic and onion spreadables). Moreover, most of the roads into the town are very narrow and inaccessible with a car, countless little shops of handmade food and handcrafted goods can be found in these roads.

=== Other attractions ===
A peculiar characteristic of Diamante are its Mural. Many of these can be found on the outside walls of houses and several of them are centuries old, dating back to the Renaissance. Because of its position Diamante was ravaged by Saracens several times during history. Some of these invasions are documented by the wall paintings.

== Geography ==
The local population is low as it is mainly a touristic place. Due to the expansion of Hotels and Resorts, the sea has gradually become more and more polluted each year. It is not uncommon to see plastic bags or oil floating over the water. However, recent efforts to clean the area seem to have improved the situation. At the moment, many seafishes inhabit the area, including jellyfishes. Not too far from the coast there is the small island of Cirella, formerly a fort against pirates.

Diamante can experience weather conditions that bring water spouts to its coastal area, which can cause damage to certain buildings in the vicinity. The harbour and seafront have also been destroyed several times.

Due to its latitude temperatures can vary wildly, especially in the summer when there is a large night-day difference.

== Transport ==
There is a train station situated in Diamante, which is linked to major cities like Naples and Messina.

== Twin towns ==
- Nucșoara, Romania
- (Italy) Rocca di Papa, cultural twinning
