= Urzulei =

Urzulei Orthullè (Sardinian)
- Comune
- Comune di Urzulei
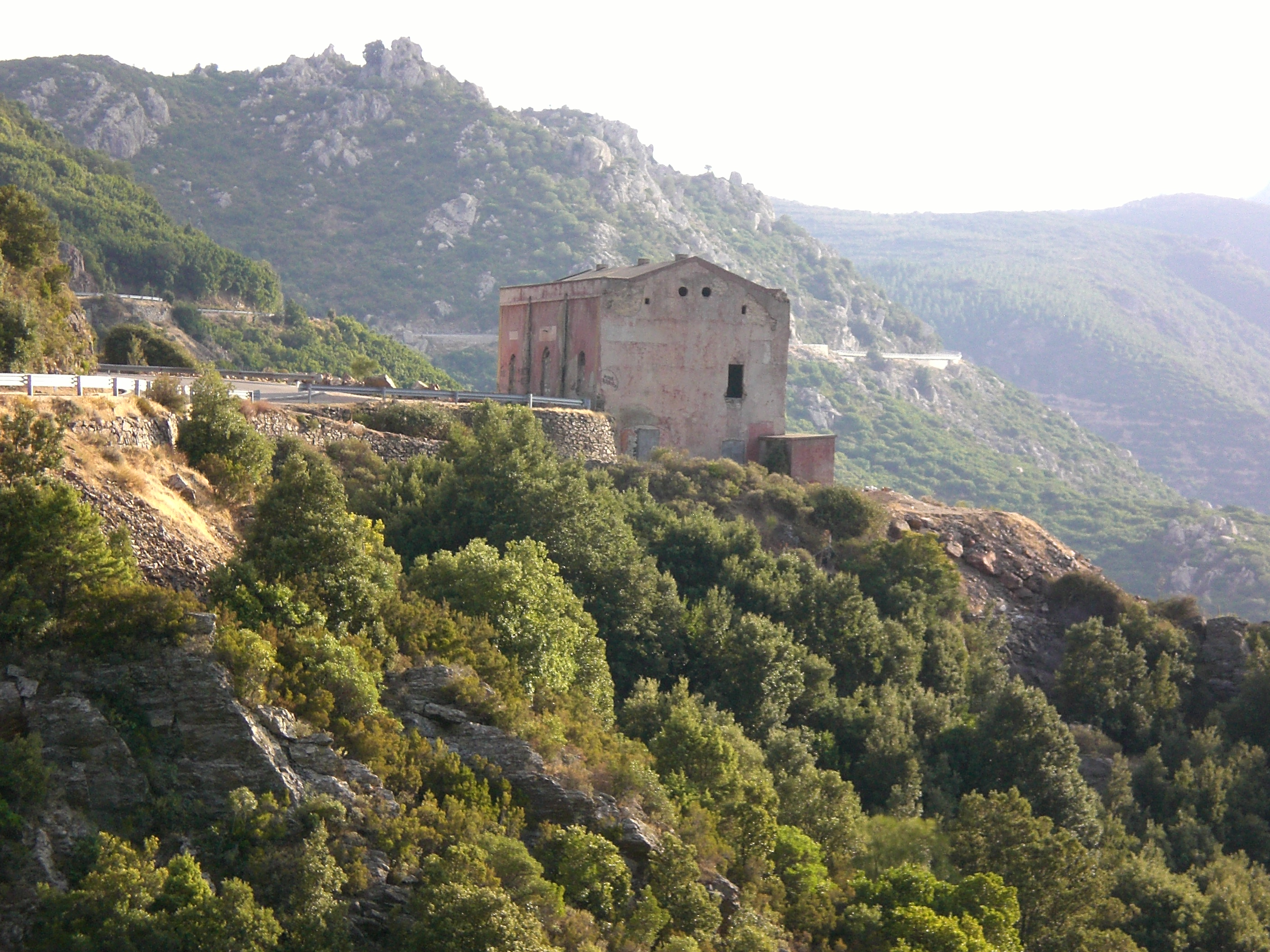
- Roadhouse

- Location within Sardinia
- Coordinates: 40°6′N 9°30′E
- Country: Italy
- Region: Sardinia
- Province: Ogliastra
- Frazioni: Silana

Area
  - Total: 129.64 km^{2} (50.05 sq mi)
- Elevation: 511 m (1,677 ft)

Population (2026)
  - Total: 1,024
  - Density: 7.899/km^{2} (20.46/sq mi)
- Demonym: Urzuleini
- Time zone: UTC+1 (CET)
  - Summer (DST): UTC+2 (CEST)
- Postal code: 08040
- Dialing code: 0782
- Website: Official website

Urzulei (Sardinian: Orthullè) is a town and comune (municipality) in the province of Ogliastra in the autonomous island region of Sardinia in Italy, located about 100 kilometres (62 mi) northeast of Cagliari and about 25 kilometres (16 mi) northwest of Tortolì. It has 1,024 inhabitants.

The municipality of Urzulei contains the frazione (subdivision) of Silana.

Urzulei borders the municipalities of Baunei, Dorgali, Orgosolo, Talana, and Triei.

== Demographics ==
As of 2026, the population is 1,024, of which 49.9% are male, and 50.1% are female. Minors make up 10.7% of the population, and seniors make up 29.1%.

Historical population

Year	Pop.	±%
1861	579	—
1871	651	+12.4%
1881	668	+2.6%
1901	608	−9.0%
1911	987	+62.3%
1921	1,026	+4.0%
1931	1,173	+14.3%
1936	1,251	+6.6%

Year	Pop.	±%
1951	1,447	+15.7%
1961	1,717	+18.7%
1971	1,576	−8.2%
1981	1,570	−0.4%
1991	1,513	−3.6%
2001	1,443	−4.6%
2011	1,295	−10.3%
2021	1,125	−13.1%

Source: ISTAT

=== Immigration ===
As of 2025, immigrants make up 2.4% of the total population. The 5 largest foreign countries of birth are Germany, Romania, Kyrgyzstan, Chile, and Ukraine.
