= Pietrafesa (painter) =

Italian painter

Giovanni De Gregorio
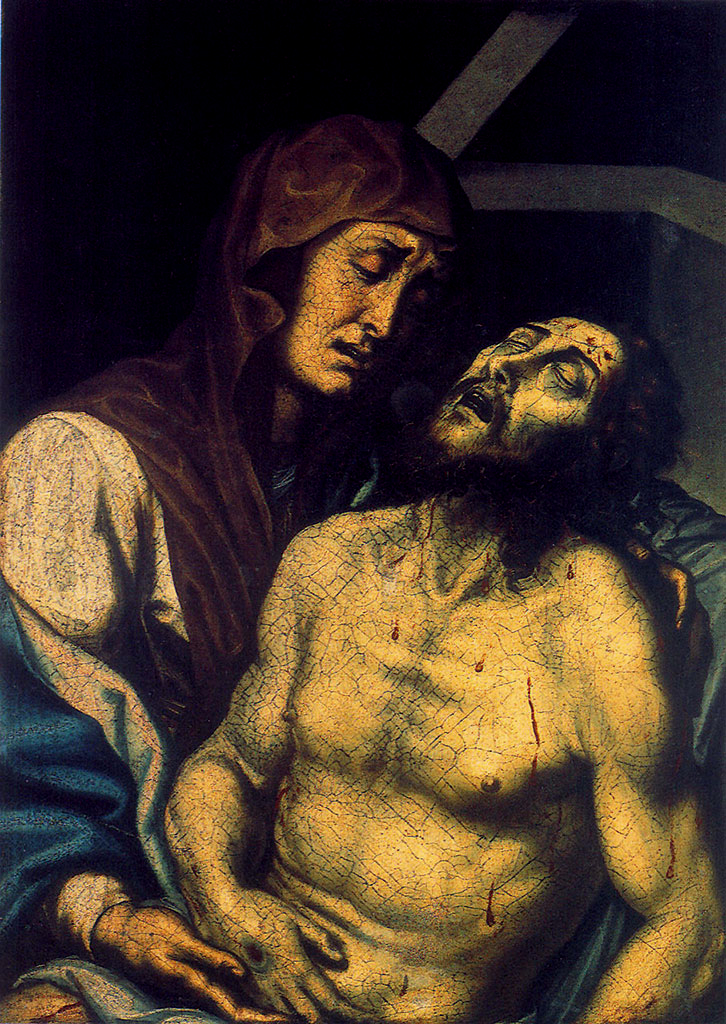
- Pietà, 1608, St. Francis Church, Potenza
- Born: 1579 or 1580; Pietrafesa (now Satriano di Lucania), Basilicata, Italy
- Died: 1656; Pignola
- Other name: il Pietrafesa
- Occupation: artist

Giovanni De Gregorio, known as il Pietrafesa (1579 or 1580 – 1656, active 1653) called thus after the ancient name of the place of origin, Satriano, the ancient Pietrafesa. Giovanni De Gregorio, or Pietrafesa, was a Lucanian painter. Active in the Kingdom of Naples between 1608 and 1653, he was a representative of the Neapolitan school. He was an Italian painter of the Baroque period. He painted an altar-piece of the Assumption of the Virgin Mary for the chapel of the convent of Marsico Nuovo.

== Biography ==
De Gregorio was born in Petra-fixia/Pietrafesa (now Satriano di Lucania), between 1579 and 1580, as was written in a notary act dated from September 27, 1595, which states that he, son of Michele, at the age of 15, attended the Neapolitan workshop of Fabrizio Santafede. He remained for six years in his workshop. He frequented assiduously the picture gallery of the prince Matteo di Capua, where he admired "Cristo" of Sebastiano del Piombo, from which he would draw the model of his religiosity and his images. He devoted himself to painting with passion and scrupulous study, to which he added a vast culture and a profound religious sense of life.

After returning to Basilicata, he moved to Vineola, today Pignola, where he married a woman from Pignola and had two children. He opened his workshop, school for other artists including Giuseppe De Gregorio (his adopted son), Girolamo Bresciano da Pietragalla and Francesco Romano da Laurenzana.

His artistic life took place between the province of Basilicata and that of Principato Citra (Salerno). But there is a gap to be filled in his biography, between 1601, the year in which he finished his training in the workshop of Santafede, and 1608, when he produced his first signed work known as La Pietà, commissioned by the church of S. Francesco di Potenza. From 1608 to 1653, he completed several works, moving to different locations in the Kingdom of Naples.

He died in 1656 at the age of 67, suffering from the plague in Pignola and rests, according to Costantino Gatta, in the mother church of Pignola.

== Works ==
- Madonna del Rosario, Albano, parish church
- Coronation of the Virgin, Anzi, Church of St. Anthony
- Madonna and Child with Saints Giovanni Battista and Carlo Borromeo, Anzi, Church of S. Lucia
- Madonna with Child and Ss. Francesco, Lorenzo and Gaetano, Balvano, church of S. Antonio
- Madonna degli Angioli, Brienza, church of S. Maria degli Angeli
- Trinitas terrestris ed Eterno, Castelmezzano, parish church
- Crucifixion with Saint Dominic, Matera, Notary Archive
- S. Antonio da Padova, Missanello, parish church
- Deposition, Moliterno, church of the convent
- S. Antonio da Padova, Pietrapertosa, church of the convent
- Madonna with Child and Saints, Pignola, Mother Church
- Christ on the cross with the Saints Borromeo and Giuseppe, Pignola, Mother Church
- S. Antonio, Potenza, Madonna del Rosario church
- S. Francesco, Potenza, Madonna del Rosario church
- Pietà, Potenza, church of S. Francesco
- Annunciation, Potenza, church of S. Michele
- Coronation of the Virgin, Titus, Church of St. Anthony
