= Orgosolo mural =

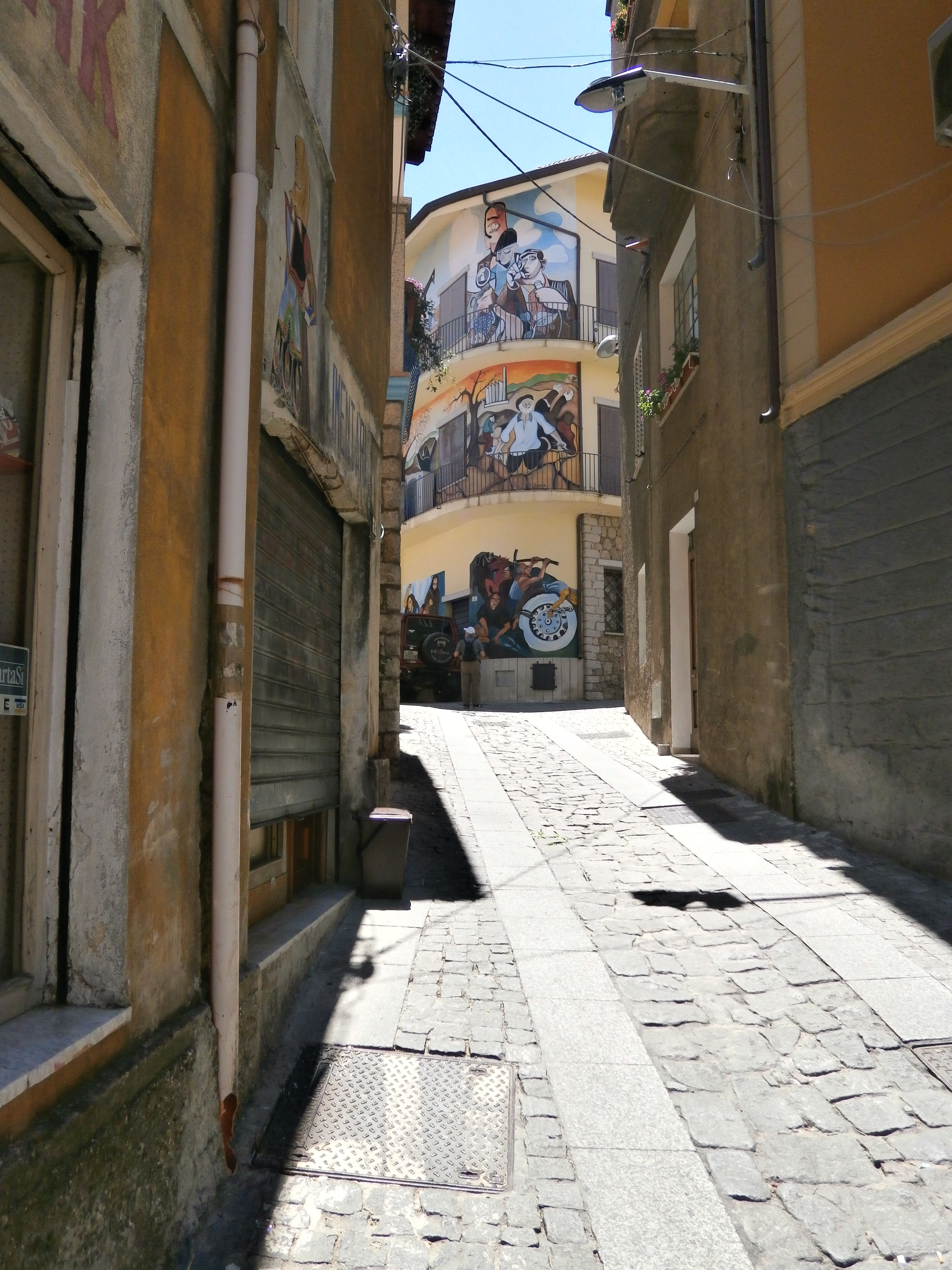
Murals in Orgosolo

The Orgosolo mural (Sardinian: murales) is the mural painted in Orgosolo, Province of Nuoro, in Sardinia, Italy. It is being investigated based on historical and anthropological approach.

== Background ==
The village of Orgosolo is located about 17 miles from Nuoro, the provincial capital. Despite the geological seclusion, the murals have rich content, from countryside view to global history. Sardinia has about 250 paintings and 150 of those are in the village of Orgosolo.

== Emergence of the mural ==
The Orgosolo mural emerged in the late 60s. It was during that time that Italy's economic miracle collapsed by massive strikes and social unrest. Especially, the later 1973 oil crisis abruptly terminated this boom. Thus, murals became a major expression of the social discontent. The first mural in Orgosolo was carried out in 1969 by Dionisio, an anarchist theatrical troupe from Milan. It questioned what was the role of the island in the Italian government's policy. After the idea of the mural spread in the small village, a local teacher, Francesco Del Casino, played an important role, as the early works were carried out by his students. Later on, more experienced workers took the job, making the murals more elaborate both in the style and in the content. Del Casino would be the instigator of most paintings of the village of Orgosolo, one of his major motivations being to get students involved in politics. Therefore, murals featured the oppression of Nazism, the struggle for liberation, unemployment ratio and education problem. Even though many kinds of topics were introduced, political events are still the major topics of the mural.

== Evolution ==
The second oil crisis in 1979 once again hit hard in Italy's fragile economy. In addition, the domestic political turmoil created high unemployment rate and high inflation. Strikes, demonstrations, petitions plagued across the country. The country showed signs of recovery around 1983. Then, it moved toward a new period of economic expansion. The growing economy gave advantages to the government to make improvements. More national infrastructure as well as better social health care, education system were built up. This improvement also reflected in murals and paintings. During this period, some of the murals depicted Sardinian village daily life. With the boom of the new economy, people started to look back into their lives with fresh eyes.

At the same time, mural creators broadened their view along with the renaissance of global economy. More and more murals related to global political events were produced, such as the Tiananmen Square protests of 1989, Pratobello protest event, protest against G8 in Genoa, the destruction of the twin towers of the World Trade Center in New York City in the September 11 attacks.

Since the 1990s, with the increase of tourism and the development of international cultural projects, the Orgosolo mural has drawn wide attention from all over the world. Organizations such as SCI (Service Civil International) has set up workshops of painting murals in Sardinia.

Nowadays, the Orgosolo mural is beginning to be recognized as "cultural heritage". In 2000, the local government provided millions of lire for the paintings' conservation and restoration. Therefore, murals in Sardinia have turned into an intellectual recognition rather than tools of political protest in the olden time. Related research by Dr. Francesca Cozzolino in the following paragraph also shows such transformation across different moments. Meanwhile, Sardinia has opened a procedure for recognition of the status of works of art for these unique paintings.

== Related research ==
Dr. Francesca Cozzolino studied the emergence and evolution of the local mural from an anthropological approach. The understanding of the mural painting as well as the aesthetics in mural design is discussed in her thesis. The process for the mural creator to perceive, digest all the global events and finally present them in the fashion of a mural is very complicated: Cozzolino believed that in order to do that, all the related subject such as anthropology, history, politics, sociology and esthetics must be considered altogether. In addition, based on the study of mural content, evolution and influence, Cozzolino concluded that three moments in the development of the Orgosolo mural can be distinguished:

- First moment: the mural served as a contest, celebration and protesting approach.
- Second moment: it became an education method and turned into a unique local cultural feature.
- Third moment: currently, murals are becoming the object of an operation of heritage conservation.
