= Talana =

- Comune
- Comune di Talana
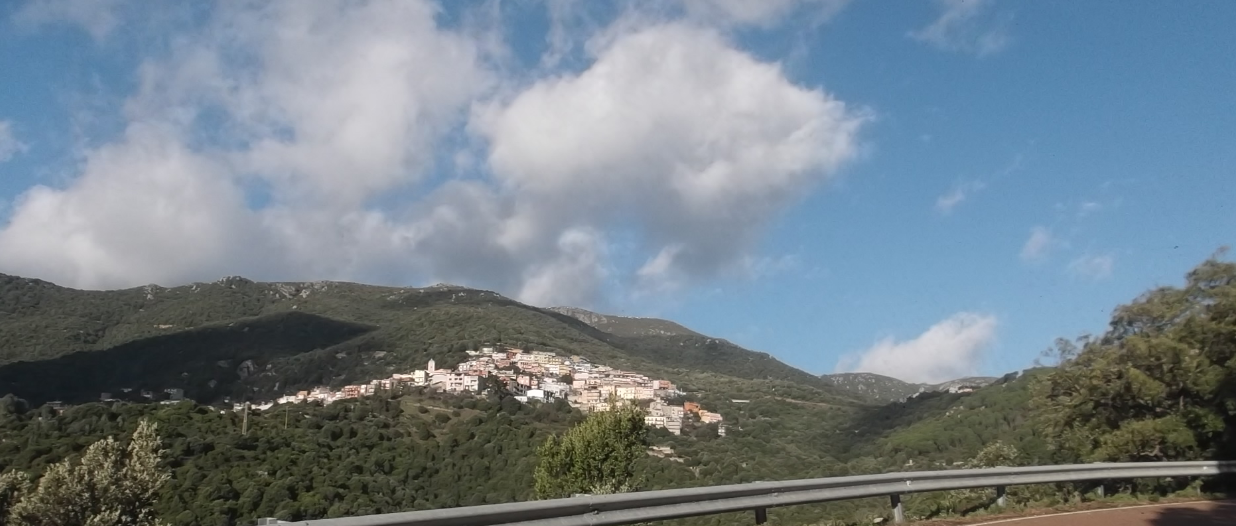
- View of Talana

- Coat of arms

- Location within Sardinia
- Coordinates: 40°02′N 09°30′E
- Country: Italy
- Region: Sardinia
- Province: Ogliastra

Area
  - Total: 118.68 km^{2} (45.82 sq mi)
- Elevation: 682 m (2,238 ft)

Population (2026)
  - Total: 913
  - Density: 7.69/km^{2} (19.9/sq mi)
- Demonym: Talanesi
- Time zone: UTC+1 (CET)
  - Summer (DST): UTC+2 (CEST)
- Postal code: 08040
- Dialing code: 0782
- Patron saint: St. Martha
- Saint day: July 29

Talana is a town and comune (municipality) in the province of Ogliastra in the autonomous island region of Sardinia in Italy. It has 913 inhabitants.

The town is located above a valley, at an elevation of almost 700 metres (2,300 ft). The area has been occupied since the Bronze Age, with many nuraghes nearby. It was part of the Giudicato of Cagliari in medieval times. There is a hotel and several bed and breakfasts in the town.

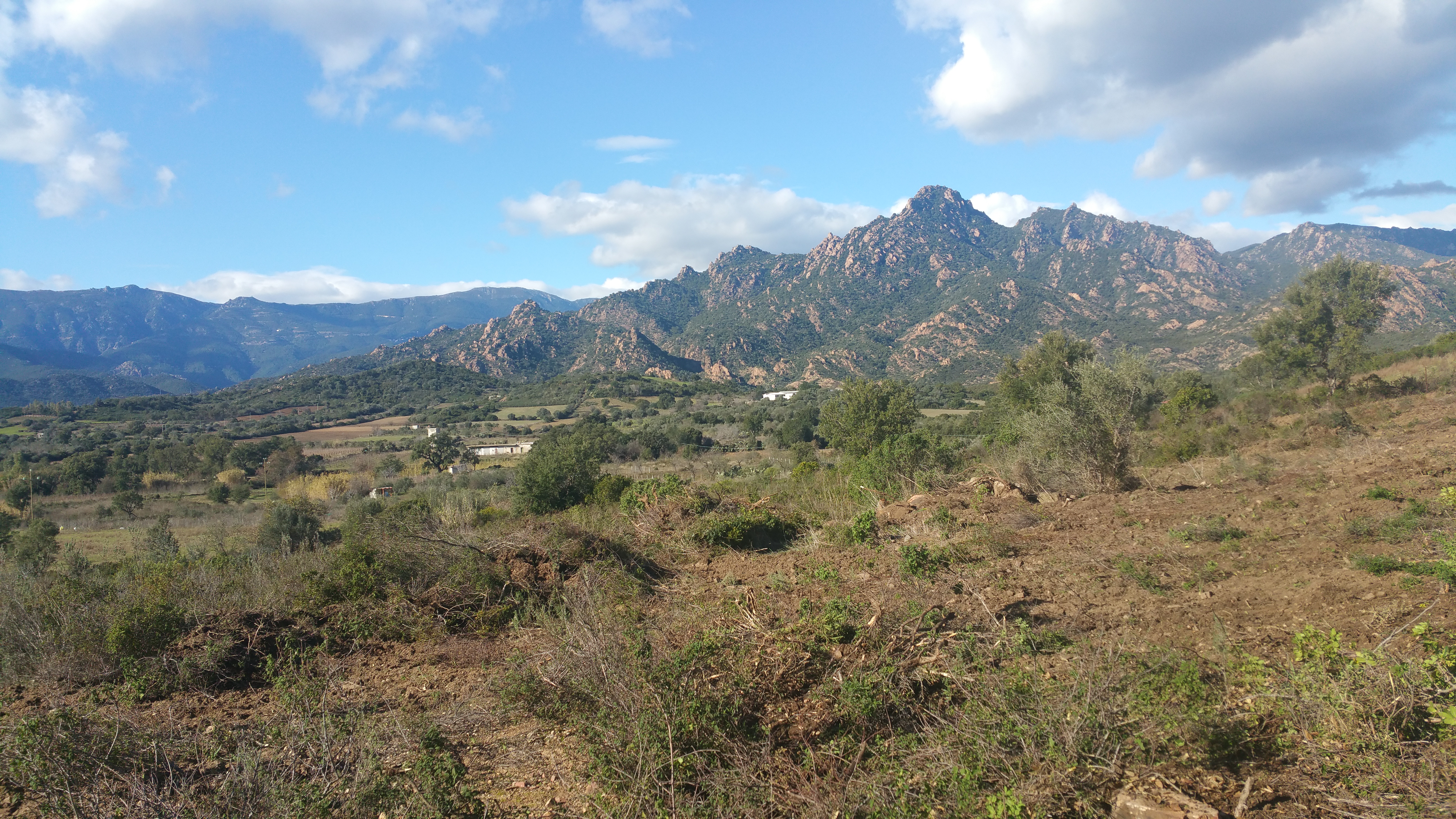
Mount Mundugia ("Munduge") seen from the Genn'e orrodas countryside

== Demographics ==
As of 2026, the population is 913, of which 47.9% are male, and 52.1% are female. Minors make up 17.1% of the population, and seniors make up 26.2%.

Historical population

Year	Pop.	±%
1861	448	—
1871	496	+10.7%
1881	520	+4.8%
1901	611	+17.5%
1911	700	+14.6%
1921	763	+9.0%
1931	872	+14.3%
1936	916	+5.0%

Year	Pop.	±%
1951	1,138	+24.2%
1961	1,347	+18.4%
1971	1,292	−4.1%
1981	1,272	−1.5%
1991	1,215	−4.5%
2001	1,129	−7.1%
2011	1,069	−5.3%
2021	964	−9.8%

Source: ISTAT

=== Immigration ===
As of 2025, immigrants make up 2.8% of the total population. The 5 largest foreign countries of birth are Germany, Romania, Belgium, France, and Hungary.
