= List of airports in Italy =

The busiest airports in Italy: the large symbols distinguish the airports with over 10 million passengers per year, the other airports have more than 700,000 passengers per year.

This is a list of airports in Italy, grouped by region and sorted by location.

== Overview ==
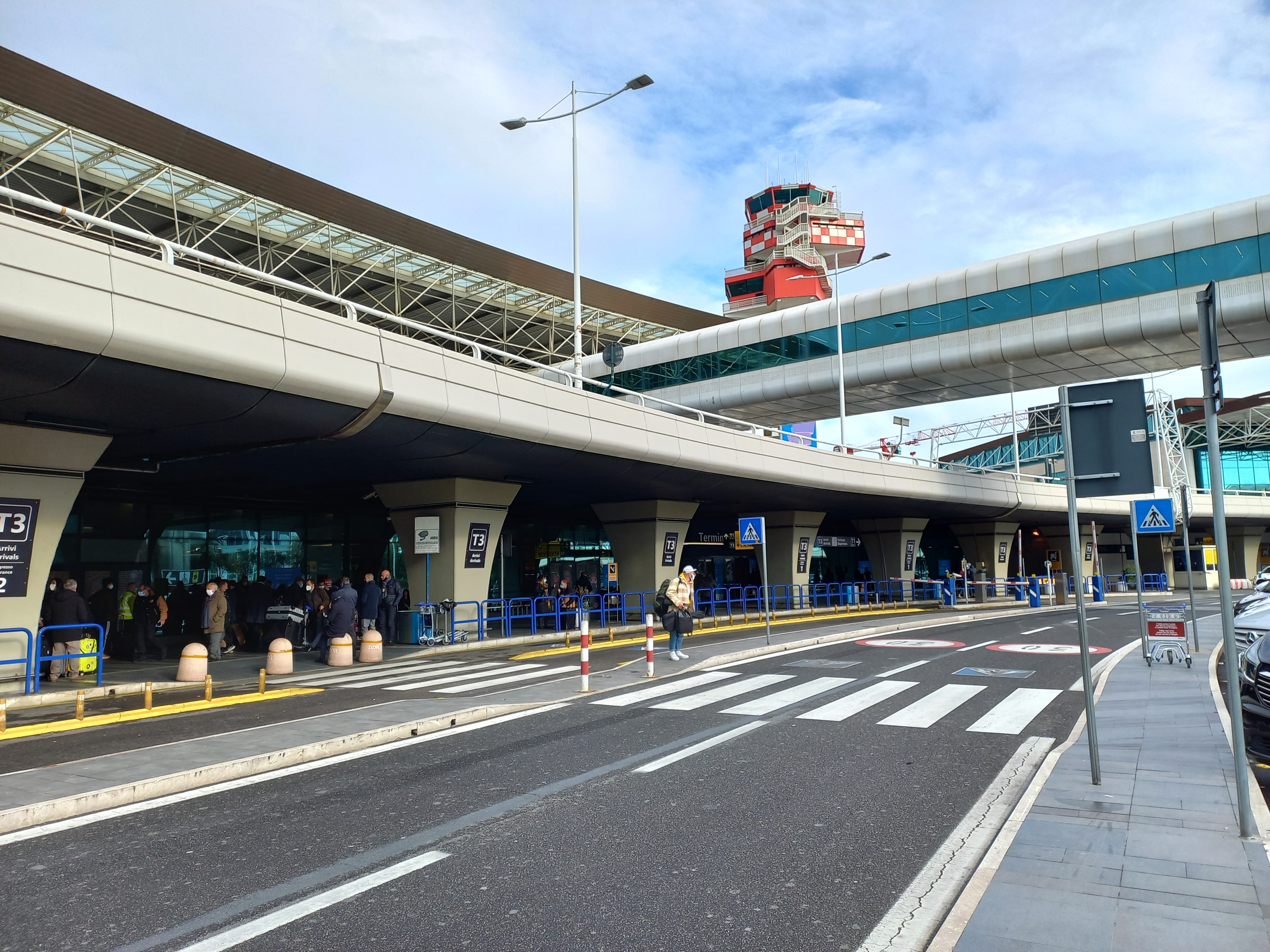
Leonardo da Vinci-Fiumicino Airport serving Rome

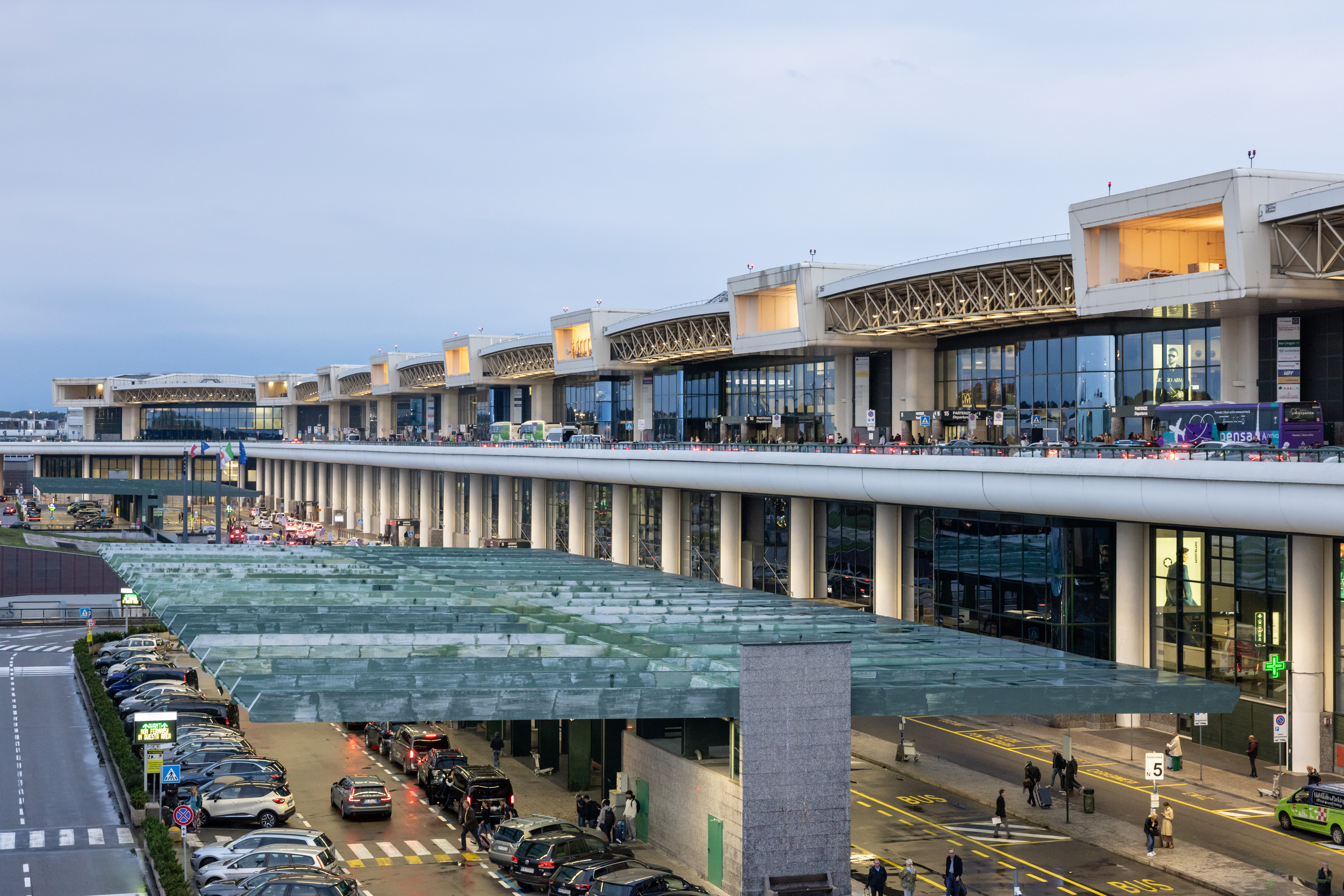
Malpensa Airport serving Milan

Italy is the fifth in Europe by number of passengers by air transport, with about 148 million passengers or about 10% of the European total in 2011. Most of passengers in Italy are on international flights (57%). A big share of domestic flights connect the major islands (Sardinia and Sicily) to the mainland. Domestic flights between major Italian cities as Rome and Milan still play a relevant role but are declining since the opening of the Italian high-speed rail network in recent years.

Italy has a total as of 130 airports in 2012, of which 99 have paved runways:

- over 3,047 m (9,997 ft): 9
- 2,438 m (7,999 ft) to 3,047 m (9,997 ft): 31
- 1,524 m (5,000 ft) to 2,437 m (7,995 ft): 18
- 914 m (2,999 ft) to 1,523 m (4,997 ft): 29
- under 914 m (2,999 ft): 12

Airports - with unpaved runways in 2012:

- total: 31
- 1,524 m (5,000 ft) to 2,437 m (7,995 ft): 1
- 914 m (2,999 ft) to 1,523 m (4,997 ft): 11
- under 914 m (2,999 ft): 19

== Airports ==
Airport names shown in bold have scheduled passenger service on commercial airlines.

City served	ICAO	IATA	Airport name
Abruzzo
L'Aquila	LIAP	QAQ	L'Aquila–Preturo Airport
Pescara	LIBP	PSR	**Abruzzo Airport** (Pescara Airport)
**Aosta Valley** (Valle d'Aosta)			
Aosta	LIMW	AOT	Aosta "Corrado Gex" Airport
**Apulia** (Puglia)			
Bari	LIBD	BRI	**Bari-Palese "Karol Wojtyla" Airport**
Brindisi / Salento	LIBR	BDS	**Brindisi-Casale "Orazio Pierozzi" Airport** (Salento Airport)
Gioia del Colle, Bari	LIBV		Gioia del Colle Air Base ("Antonio Ramirez")
Foggia	LIBF	FOG	**Foggia "Gino Lisa" Airport**
Foggia	LIBA		Foggia-Amendola "Luigi Rovelli" Airport (military)
Lecce	LIBN	LCC	Lecce Galatina Airport
Martina Franca, Taranto	LIBX		Martina Franca Air Base
Taranto	LIBG	TAR	Taranto-Grottaglie "Marcello Arlotta" Airport
**Basilicata**			
Pisticci			Basilicata "Enrico Mattei" Airfield
**Calabria**			
Crotone	LIBC	CRV	**Crotone-Sant'Anna "Pitagora" Airport**
Lamezia Terme, Catanzaro	LICA	SUF	**Lamezia Terme Airport**
Reggio Calabria	LICR	REG	**Reggio Calabria "Tito Minniti" Airport**
**Campania**			
Benevento	LIRO		Benevento-Olivola Airport (military)
Capua	LIAU		Capua "Oreste Salomone" Airport (public/military)
Caserta	LIRM		Caserta-Grazzanise "Carlo Romagnoli" Airport (Grazzanise Air Base) (military)
Naples	LIRN	NAP	**Naples-Capodichino "Ugo Niutta" Airport**
Salerno	LIRI	QSR	**Salerno Costa d'Amalfi Airport**
**Emilia-Romagna**			
Bologna	LIPE	BLQ	**Bologna-Borgo Panigale "Guglielmo Marconi" Airport**
Carpi	LIDU		Carpi Budrione "Danilo Ascari" Airport
Cervia, Ravenna	LIPC		Cervia Air Force Base
Ferrara	LIPF		Ferrara Airport
Forlì	LIPK	FRL	**Forlì "Luigi Ridolfi" Airport**
Lugo di Romagna, Ravenna	LIDG		Lugo di Romagna "Francesco Baracca" Airport
Modena	LIPM		Modena Airport
Parma	LIMP	PMF	**Parma "Giuseppe Verdi" Airport**
Pavullo nel Frignano	LIDP		Pavullo nel Frignano Airport
Piacenza	LIMS		Piacenza-San Damiano "Gaetano Mazza" Airport (military)
Prati vecchi d'Aguscello, Ferrara	LIDV		Prati vecchi d'Aguscello airport
Ravenna	LIDR	RAN	Ravenna "Gastone Novelli" Airport
Reggio Emilia	LIDE		Reggio Emilia "Ferdinando Bonazzi" Airport
Rimini	LIPR	RMI	**Rimini-Miramare "Federico Fellini" Airport**
**Friuli-Venezia Giulia**			
Aviano, Pordenone	LIPA	AVB	Aviano Air Base ("Maurizio Pagliano & Luigi Gori")
Campoformido, Udine	LIPD	UDN	Udine-Campoformido Airport (military until 2008)
Codroipo, Udine	LIPI		Rivolto "Mario Visentini" Airport (military)
Ronchi dei Legionari / Trieste	LIPQ	TRS	**Friuli-Venezia Giulia "Pietro Savorgnan di Brazzà" Airport** (Trieste Ronchi dei Legionari Airport)
**Lazio**			
Centocelle, Rome	LIRC		Centocelle Airport (military)
Frosinone	LIRH		Frosinone "Girolamo Moscardini" Airport (military)
Guidonia Montecelio, Rome	LIRG		Guidonia "Alfredo Barbieri" Airport (military)
Latina	LIRL		Latina Airport (military)
Pomezia, Rome	LIRE		Pratica di Mare Air Force Base ("Mario de Bernardi")
Rieti	LIQN		Rieti Airport (G. Ciuffelli Airport)
Rome	LIRF	FCO	**Rome-Fiumicino "Leonardo da Vinci" Airport**
Rome	LIRA	CIA	**Rome Ciampino "Giovan Battista Pastine" Airport**
Rome	LIRU		Rome Urbe Airport
Viterbo	LIRV		Rome Viterbo Airport / Viterbo Air Force Base ("Tommaso Fabbri")
**Liguria**			
Albenga, Savona	LIMG	ALL	Villanova d'Albenga "Clemente Panero" Airport
Genoa (Genova) / Sestri Ponente	LIMJ	GOA	**Genoa "Cristoforo Colombo" Airport**
Sarzana, La Spezia	LIQW		Sarzana Airport (military/civil)
**Lombardy** (Lombardia)			
Bergamo	LIME	BGY	**Bergamo-Orio al Serio "Il Caravaggio" Airport**
Brescia	LIPO	VBS	Brescia-Montichiari "Gabriele D'Annunzio" Airport
Ghedi, Brescia	LIPL		Ghedi Air Base (military)
Cremona	LILR		Migliaro Airport
Milan	LIMC	MXP	**Milan-Malpensa “Silvio Berlusconi” Airport**
Milan	LIML	LIN	**Milan-Linate "Enrico Forlanini" Airport**
Milan	LIMB		Bresso Airport
Varese	LILN		Varese-Venegono Airport
Vergiate, Varese	LILG		Vergiate Airport
Voghera, Pavia	LILH		Voghera-Rivanazzano Airport
**Marche**			
Ancona	LIPY	AOI	**Ancona-Falconara "Raffaello Sanzio" Airport**
Fano, Pesaro & Urbino	LIDF		Fano "Enzo Omiccioli" Airport
**Piedmont** (Piemonte)			
Biella	LILE		Biella-Cerrione Airport
Cameri, Novara	LIMN		Cameri "Natale & Silvio Palli" Airport (military)
Cuneo	LIMZ	CUF	**Cuneo-Levaldigi "Turin Olympics" Airport**
Turin (Torino)	LIMF	TRN	**Turin-Caselle "Sandro Pertini" Airport**
Turin (Torino)	LIMA		Turin-Aeritalia "Edoardo Agnelli" Airport
**Sardinia** (Sardegna)			
Alghero	LIEA	AHO	**Alghero-Fertilia "Riviera del Corallo" Airport**
Cagliari	LIEE	CAG	**Cagliari-Elmas "Mario Mameli" Airport**
Decimomannu, Cagliari	LIED	DCI	Decimomannu Air Base ("G. Farina")
Olbia	LIEO	OLB	**Olbia Costa Smeralda Airport**
Oristano	LIER	FNU	Oristano-Fenosu Airport
Tortolì / Arbatax, Nuoro	LIET	TTB	Tortolì-Arbatax Airport
**Sicily** (Sicilia)			
Catania	LICC	CTA	**Catania-Fontanarossa "Vincenzo Bellini" Airport**
Comiso	LICB	CIY	**Comiso "Vincenzo Magliocco" Airport**
Lampedusa	LICD	LMP	**Lampedusa Airport**
Palermo	LICJ	PMO	**Palermo-Punta Raisi "Falcone & Borsellino" Airport**
Palermo	LICP		Palermo-Boccadifalco "Emanuele Notarbartolo" Airport
Pantelleria, Trapani	LICG	PNL	**Pantelleria Airport** (public/military)
Sigonella	LICZ	NSY	Naval Air Station Sigonella (military)
Trapani	LICT	TPS	**Trapani-Birgi "Vincenzo Florio" Airport**
**Trentino-Alto Adige/Südtirol**			
Bolzano	LIPB	BZO	**Bolzano-Dolomiti "Francesco Baracca" Airport**
Toblach (Dobbiaco)	LIVD		Toblach Airport
Trento	LIDT		Trento "Gianni Caproni" Airport
**Tuscany** (Toscana)			
Arezzo	LIQB		Arezzo-Molin Bianco Airport
Florence (Firenze)	LIRQ	FLR	**Florence-Peretola "Amerigo Vespucci" Airport**
Grosseto	LIRS	GRS	Aeroporto della Maremma "Corrado Baccarini" Airport (public/military)
Lucca	LIQL	LCV	Lucca-Tassignano "Enrico Squaglia" Airport
Marina di Campo, Elba	LIRJ	EBA	**Marina di Campo "Teseo Tesei" Airport**
Pisa	LIRP	PSA	**Pisa-San Giusto "Galileo Galilei" Airport** (public/military)
Pontedera, Pisa	LIAT		Pontedera Airport (military)
Siena	LIQS	SAY	Siena–Ampugnano Airport
**Umbria**			
Foligno	LIAF		Foligno "Giorgio Franceschi" Airport
Perugia	LIRZ	PEG	**Perugia-Sant'Egidio "Adamo Giuglietti" Airport**
**Veneto**			
Asiago, Vicenza	LIDA		Asiago "Romeo Sartori" Airport
Belluno	LIDB	BLX	Belluno "Arturo dell'Oro" Airport
Padua (Padova)	LIPU	QPA	Padua "Gino Allegri" Airport (public/military)
Thiene	LIDH		Thiene Airport
Treviso	LIPH	TSF	**Treviso-Sant'Angelo "Antonio Canova" Airport**
Treviso	LIPS		Treviso-Istrana Airport (military)
Venice (Venezia)	LIPZ	VCE	**Venice Marco Polo Airport**
Venice (Venezia)	LIPV		Venice-Lido "Giovanni Nicelli" Airport ("Venezia/Lido")
Verona	LIPX	VRN	**Verona-Villafranca "Valerio Catullo" Airport**
Verona	LIPN		Verona-Boscomantico Airport
Vicenza	LIPT	VIC	Vicenza "Tommaso Dal Molin" Airport (public/military)

== Busiest airports ==
=== 2022 ===
Rank	Airport	Serves	Total passengers (2022)
1	Rome Fiumicino	Rome	29,360,613
2	Milan Malpensa	Milan	21,347,652
3	Orio al Serio	Bergamo, Milan	13,155,806
4	Naples	Naples	10,918,234
5	Catania	Catania	10,099,441
6	Venice Marco Polo	Venice	9,319,156
7	Bologna	Bologna, Florence	8,496,000
8	Milan Linate	Milan	7,719,977
9	Palermo	Palermo	7,117,822
10	Bari	Bari	6,205,461
11	Pisa	Pisa	4,493,847
12	Cagliari	Cagliari	4,396,594
13	Turin	Turin	4,193,371
14	Rome Ciampino	Rome	3,475,902
15	Olbia	Olbia	3,167,368
16	Brindisi	Brindisi	3,065,962
17	Verona	Verona	2,982,060
18	Treviso	Treviso	2,635,172
19	Lamezia Terme	Lamezia Terme	2,622,535
20	Florence	Florence	2,228,999
21	Alghero	Alghero	1,533,427
22	Genoa	Genoa	1,222,888
23	Trapani	Trapani	891,670
24	Pescara	Pescara	715,690
25	Trieste	Trieste	698,613
26	Ancona	Ancona	467,622
27	Perugia	Perugia	369,222
28	Comiso	Ragusa	364,735
29	Lampedusa	Lampedusa	328,576
30	Rimini	Rimini	214,851
31	Reggio Calabria	Reggio Calabria	202,386
32	Crotone	Crotone	170,898
33	Cuneo	Cuneo	160,189
34	Parma	Parma	116,720
35	Forlì	Forlì	94,610
36	Bolzano	Bolzano	66,179
37	Brescia	Brescia	7,245
38	Foggia	Foggia	7,049
39	Grosseto	Grosseto	5,511
40	Taranto	Taranto	1,083
Total			164,641,136

=== 2017 ===
This is a list of the top ten busiest airports in Italy in 2017.

Airport	Movements	Passengers			Freight (tons)
Airport	Movements	domestics	internationals	total	Freight (tons)
Rome Fiumicino	297,491	11,462,218	29,378,923	40,971,881	185,898.6
Milan Malpensa	178,953	3,164,224	18,873,017	22,169,167	589,719
Bergamo Orio al Serio	86,113	3,270,761	9,060,022	12,336,137	125,948
Venice Marco Polo	92,263	1,358,618	8,988,759	10,371,380	60,852.8
Milan Linate	117,730	4,927,688	4,575,377	9,548,363	13,815
Catania Fontanarossa	68,170	6,184,360	2,925,385	9,120,913	6,691.3
Naples Capodichino	75,013	2,976,752	5,575,471	8,577,507	11,068.5
Bologna Guglielmo Marconi	71,878	1,935,193	6,246,461	8,198,156	56,132.1
Rome Ciampino	54,236	218,880	5,636,570	5,885,812	17,042.4
Palermo Punta Raisi	46,627	4,399,601	1,353,444	5,775,274	324
Other	463,843	22,018,266	20,254,008	42,430,814	77,727.3
Total	1,552,317	61,916,561	112,867,437	175,415,404	1,145,219

== See also ==
- Transport in Italy
- List of airports by ICAO code: L#LI – Italy (and San Marino)
- List of the busiest airports in Italy
- Wikipedia:WikiProject Aviation/Airline destination lists: Europe#Italy
