= Carpi-Budrione Airport =

Carpi-Budrione Airport Aeroporto di Carpi-Budrione
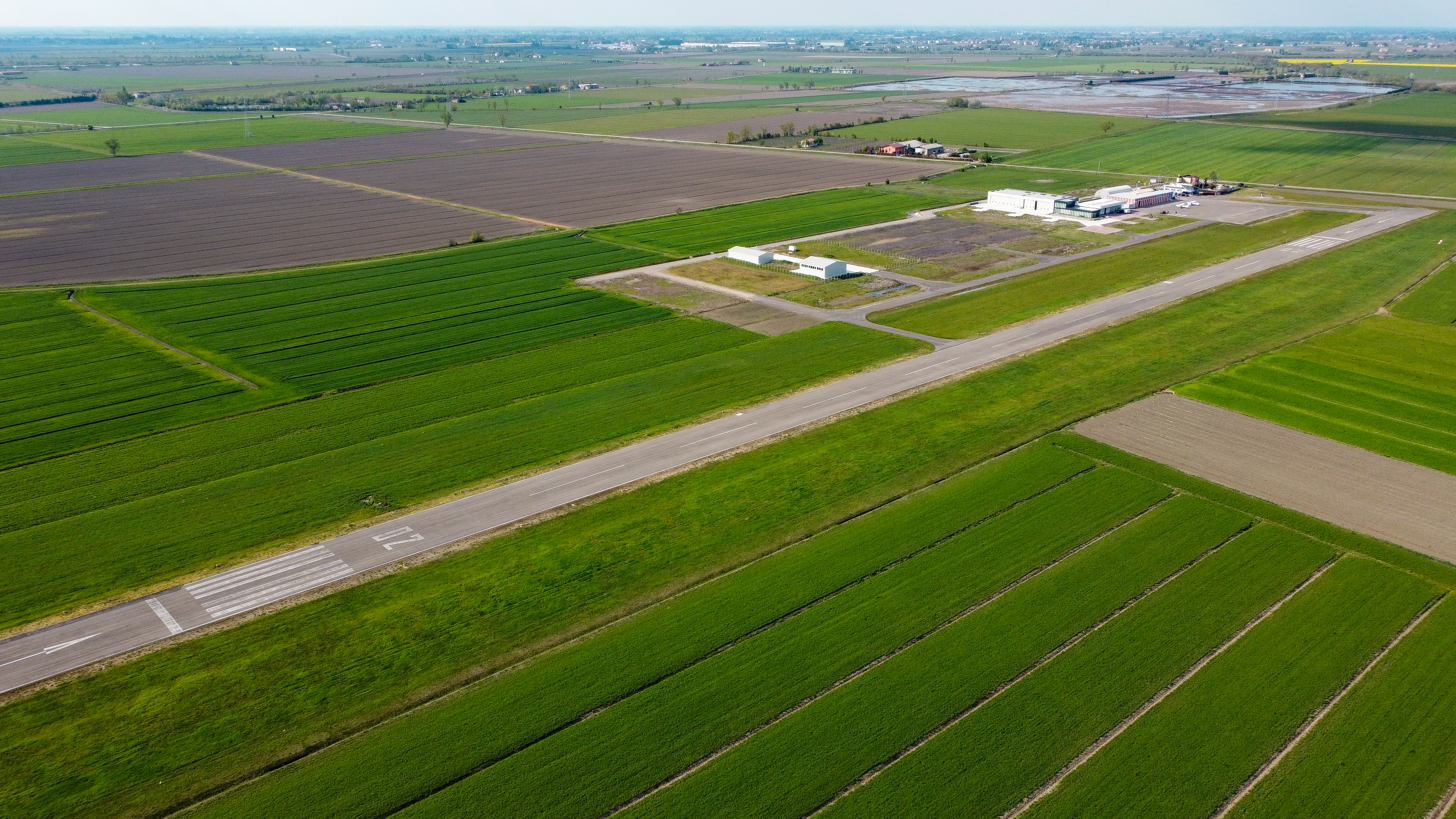
- IATA: none; ICAO: LIDU

Summary
- Airport type: Public
- Operator: Aeroclub Carpi
- Serves: Carpi, Italy
- Location: Budrione, Carpi, Emilia-Romagna, Italy
- Elevation AMSL: 69 ft (21 m)
- Coordinates: 44.834444°N 10.871944°E
- Interactive map of Carpi-Budrione Airport

Runways
Direction	Length		Surface
Direction	ft	m	Surface
02/20	850	259	Asphalt

Carpi-Budrione Airport (Italian: Aeroporto di Carpi-Budrione) (IATA: nessuno, ICAO: LIDU), is an airport in Italy located 20 km north of the city of Modena, along state road 413 in the direction of Mantova, in the territory of the commune of Carpi.

== Description ==
The airport is located near the other regional airports of Parma and Reggio Emilia, both of which are located further south along the Via Aemilia, which are more developed and frequented. The facility, named in memory of the airman Danilo Ascari, is equipped with an asphalt runway that is 850 m long and 20 m wide located at an elevation of 21 m (69 ft) above sea level.

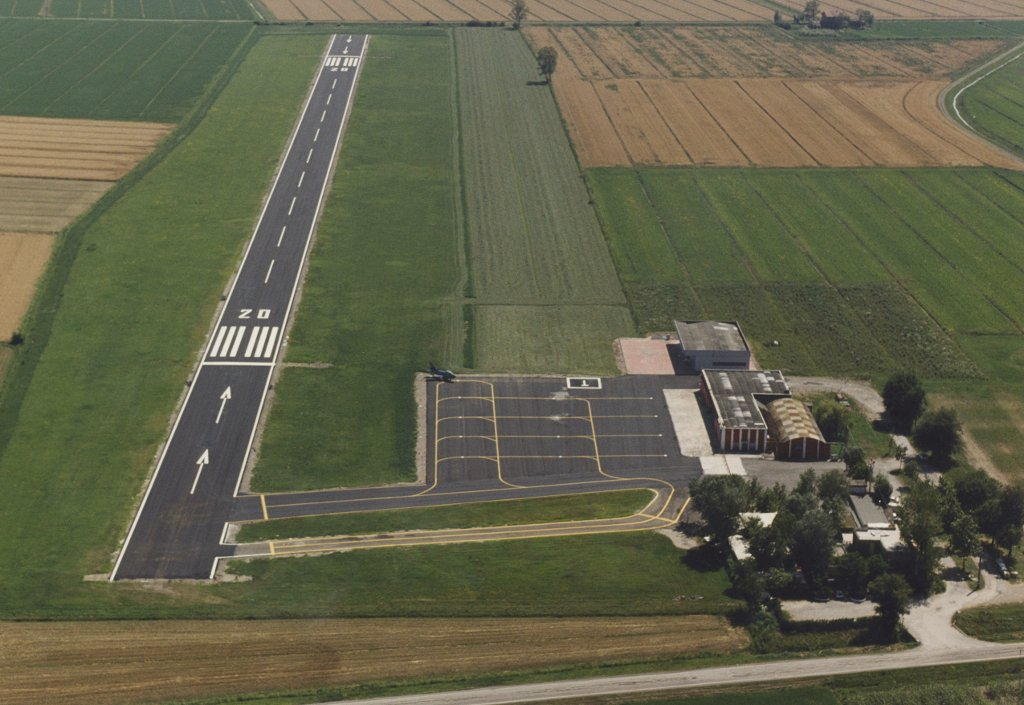
The airport in 2000

== History ==
In 2006, in conjunction with a business initiative by the Ghidotti Aeronautical Workshops which saw the creation of a hub for the maintenance of tourist aircraft at the airport, the mayor of Carpi expressed his desire to invest in the facility, with the intention of expanding the runway and making the airport an opportunity for the local economy. In the same year the exhibition of the Frecce Tricolori was held.

On 19 September 2021 at around 5:00 PM local time, a tornado hit the Città di Carpi aeroclub, causing extensive damage to the hangar and 7 recreational aircraft.

== See also ==
- Bologna Guglielmo Marconi Airport
- Parma-Verdi Airport
- Rimini-Miramare Airport
- Piacenza-San Damiano Air Base
- Forlì Airport
- Pavullo nel Frignano Airport
