= Bari Sardo =

Bari Sardo Barì (Sardinian)
- Comune
- Comune di Bari Sardo
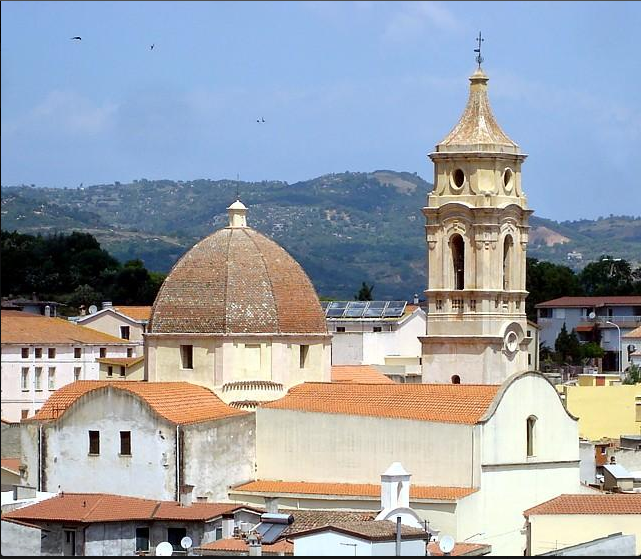
- View of Bari Sardo

- Location within Sardinia
- Coordinates: 39°51′N 9°39′E
- Country: Italy
- Region: Sardinia
- Province: Ogliastra

Government
  - Mayor: Ivan Mameli

Area
  - Total: 37.43 km^{2} (14.45 sq mi)
- Elevation: 51 m (167 ft)

Population (2026)
  - Total: 3,770
  - Density: 101/km^{2} (261/sq mi)
- Demonym: Bariesi
- Time zone: UTC+1 (CET)
  - Summer (DST): UTC+2 (CEST)
- Postal code: 08042
- Dialing code: 0782
- Website: Official website

Bari Sardo (Sardinian: Barì; Latin: Custodia Rubriensis) is a town and comune (municipality) in the Province of Ogliastra in the autonomous island region of Sardinia in Italy, located about 120 km (75 mi) northeast of Cagliari and about 9 kilometres (6 mi) south of Tortolì. It has 3,770 inhabitants.

Bari Sardo borders the municipalities of Cardedu, Ilbono, Lanusei, Loceri, and Tortolì.

== Climate ==
Climate data for Bari Sardo (1981-2020)
Month	Jan	Feb	Mar	Apr	May	Jun	Jul	Aug	Sep	Oct	Nov	Dec	Year
Mean daily maximum °C (°F)	15.0 (59.0)	16.2 (61.2)	18.6 (65.5)	20.7 (69.3)	24.7 (76.5)	28.9 (84.0)	32.2 (90.0)	32.5 (90.5)	28.5 (83.3)	24.7 (76.5)	20.0 (68.0)	16.1 (61.0)	23.2 (73.8)
Mean daily minimum °C (°F)	5.3 (41.5)	5.6 (42.1)	7.2 (45.0)	8.9 (48.0)	13.0 (55.4)	16.9 (62.4)	20.3 (68.5)	21.0 (69.8)	17.5 (63.5)	14.0 (57.2)	9.9 (49.8)	6.9 (44.4)	12.2 (54.0)
Source: Climatologia della Sardegna per il trentennio 1981-2010

== Demographics ==
As of 2026, the population is 3,770, of which 48.4% are male, and 51.6% are female. Minors make up 13.3% of the population, and seniors make up 29.7%.

Historical population

Year	Pop.	±%
1861	1,508	—
1871	1,578	+4.6%
1881	1,503	−4.8%
1901	1,592	+5.9%
1911	1,759	+10.5%
1921	1,790	+1.8%
1931	2,063	+15.3%
1936	2,271	+10.1%

Year	Pop.	±%
1951	2,742	+20.7%
1961	3,282	+19.7%
1971	3,546	+8.0%
1981	3,786	+6.8%
1991	3,996	+5.5%
2001	3,871	−3.1%
2011	3,938	+1.7%
2021	3,861	−2.0%

Source: ISTAT

=== Immigration ===
As of 2025, immigrants make up 7.0% of the total population. The 5 largest foreign countries of birth are Germany, Morocco, Romania, France, and Brazil.
