= Ilbono =

Ilbono Irbono (Sardinian)
- Comune
- Comune di Ilbono
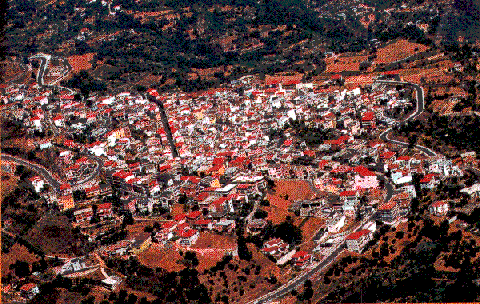
- View of Ilbono from the sky

- Location within Sardinia
- Coordinates: 39°54′N 9°33′E
- Country: Italy
- Region: Sardinia
- Province: Ogliastra

Government
  - Mayor: Andrea Piroddi

Area
  - Total: 31.13 km^{2} (12.02 sq mi)
- Elevation: 400 m (1,300 ft)

Population (2026)
  - Total: 1,966
  - Density: 63.15/km^{2} (163.6/sq mi)
- Demonym: Ilbonesi
- Time zone: UTC+1 (CET)
  - Summer (DST): UTC+2 (CEST)
- Postal code: 08040
- Dialing code: 0782
- Website: Official website

Ilbono (Sardinian: Irbono) is a town and comune (municipality) in the Province of Ogliastra in the autonomous island region of Sardinia in Italy, located about 80 kilometres (50 mi) northeast of Cagliari and about 9 kilometres (6 mi) southwest of Tortolì. It has 1,966 inhabitants. Its economy is based heavily on heavy industry.

Ilbono borders the municipalities of Arzana, Bari Sardo, Elini, Lanusei, Loceri, and Tortolì.

== Demographics ==
As of 2026, the population is 1,966, of which 48.8% are male, and 51.2% are female. Minors make up 13.5% of the population, and seniors make up 28.6%.

Historical population

Year	Pop.	±%
1861	1,514	—
1871	1,483	−2.0%
1881	1,647	+11.1%
1901	1,865	+13.2%
1911	1,962	+5.2%
1921	1,732	−11.7%
1931	1,900	+9.7%
1936	2,007	+5.6%

Year	Pop.	±%
1951	2,222	+10.7%
1961	2,494	+12.2%
1971	2,471	−0.9%
1981	2,474	+0.1%
1991	2,388	−3.5%
2001	2,293	−4.0%
2011	2,207	−3.8%
2021	2,004	−9.2%

Source: ISTAT

=== Immigration ===
As of 2025, immigrants make up 3.1% of the total population. The 5 largest foreign countries of birth are Germany, France, Kyrgyzstan, Morocco, and Belgium.
