= Modenese (sheep breed) =

Italian breed of sheep

- Conservation status: FAO (2007): extinct; DAD-IS (2026): not listed
- Other names: Appennino-Modenese; Balestra; Emiliana di Pianura; Pavullese
- Country of origin: Italy
- Distribution: Emilia-Romagna; Veneto
- Use: meat

Traits
- Weight: Male: 50 kg; Female: 40 kg
- Wool colour: white
- Face colour: white, often with black patches, particularly round the eyes

The Modenese is an Italian breed of triple-purpose sheep – raised for milk, meat and wool – from the regions of Emilia-Romagna and the Veneto in north-central Italy. It was formerly considered to be extinct, until the early twenty-first century when two breeding groups of the sheep were identified in the province of Bologna. It may also be known as the Appennino-Modenese, the Balestra, the Emiliana di Pianura or the Pavullese.

== History ==
The origins of the Modenese are unclear; It may derive from the Garfagnina Bianca, with some influence of the Bergamasca. It was documented in the 1930s in the plains of the Veneto, and was photographed at about the same time at Pavullo in the Apennines of the province of Modena. By about 1970 it was reported to be extinct.

In the early twenty-first century two breeding nuclei of the sheep were identified in the province of Bologna during a census of sheep of the Cornella Bianca breed of that area.

The Modenese is not among the forty-two autochthonous local sheep breeds of limited distribution for which a flock-book is kept by the Associazione Nazionale della Pastorizia, the Italian national association of sheep-breeders.

== Characteristics ==
It is a small sheep: average body weights are about 40 kg for ewes and 50 kg for rams. It is characterised by a pronouncedly convex facial profile and by wide-spreading twisted horns. The fleece is white, as are the face and legs, which however may have patches of black, most frequently round the eyes.

== Use ==
The Modenese is a triple-purpose breed, reared for the production of lamb, of milk and of wool. The wool is of coarse quality; the annual yield is approximately 2.5 kg in two shearings.

The management of the flocks was transhumant – they were moved in late spring or early summer up to the upland pastures of the Apennines of the province of Modena for the summer months, and in autumn down to the plains of Emilia-Romagna and the Veneto for the winter, particularly in the provinces of Bologna, Ferrara, Modena and Rovigo.
