= Olina =

Olina may refer to:

== People ==
- Giovanni Pietro Olina (1585–1645), Italian naturalist, lawyer, and theologian
- Olina Storsand Storsand (born 1922), Norwegian politician
- Ruth Olina Lødemel Lødemel (born 1966), Norwegian soprano, dancer, actor and composer
- Steinunn Ólína Þorsteinsdóttir (born 1969), Icelandic actress, TV show host, producer and writer
- Ólína Guðbjörg Viðarsdóttir (born 1982), Icelandic football player
- Ólína Þorvarðardóttir (born 1958), Icelandic politician

== Places ==
- Olina, Italy

== Other ==
- Olina, genus also known as Vila (butterfly)
