= Elini =

- Comune
- Comune di Elini
- Coat of arms

- Location within Sardinia
- Coordinates: 39°54′N 9°32′E
- Country: Italy
- Region: Sardinia
- Province: Ogliastra

Government
  - Mayor: Stefano Stochino

Area
  - Total: 10.65 km^{2} (4.11 sq mi)
- Elevation: 472 m (1,549 ft)

Population (2026)
  - Total: 555
  - Density: 52.1/km^{2} (135/sq mi)
- Demonym: Elinesi
- Time zone: UTC+1 (CET)
  - Summer (DST): UTC+2 (CEST)
- Postal code: 08040
- Dialing code: 0782

Elini is a village and comune (municipality) in the Province of Ogliastra in the autonomous island region of Sardinia in Italy, located about 80 kilometres (50 mi) northeast of Cagliari and about 11 kilometres (7 mi) southwest of Tortolì. It has 555 inhabitants.

Elini borders the municipalities of Arzana, Ilbono, Lanusei, and Tortolì.

== Demographics ==
As of 2026, the population is 555, of which 48.8% are male, and 51.2% are female. Minors make up 14.8% of the population, and seniors make up 22.9%.

Historical population

Year	Pop.	±%
1861	335	—
1871	328	−2.1%
1881	340	+3.7%
1901	417	+22.6%
1911	491	+17.7%
1921	462	−5.9%
1931	481	+4.1%
1936	501	+4.2%

Year	Pop.	±%
1951	510	+1.8%
1961	523	+2.5%
1971	494	−5.5%
1981	494	+0.0%
1991	526	+6.5%
2001	553	+5.1%
2011	550	−0.5%
2021	559	+1.6%

Source: ISTAT

=== Immigration ===
As of 2025, immigrants make up 4.8% of the total population. The foreign countries of birth are Germany, France, Romania, Belgium, DR Congo, the United Kingdom and the Dominican Republic.
