= Loceri =

- Comune
- Comune di Loceri
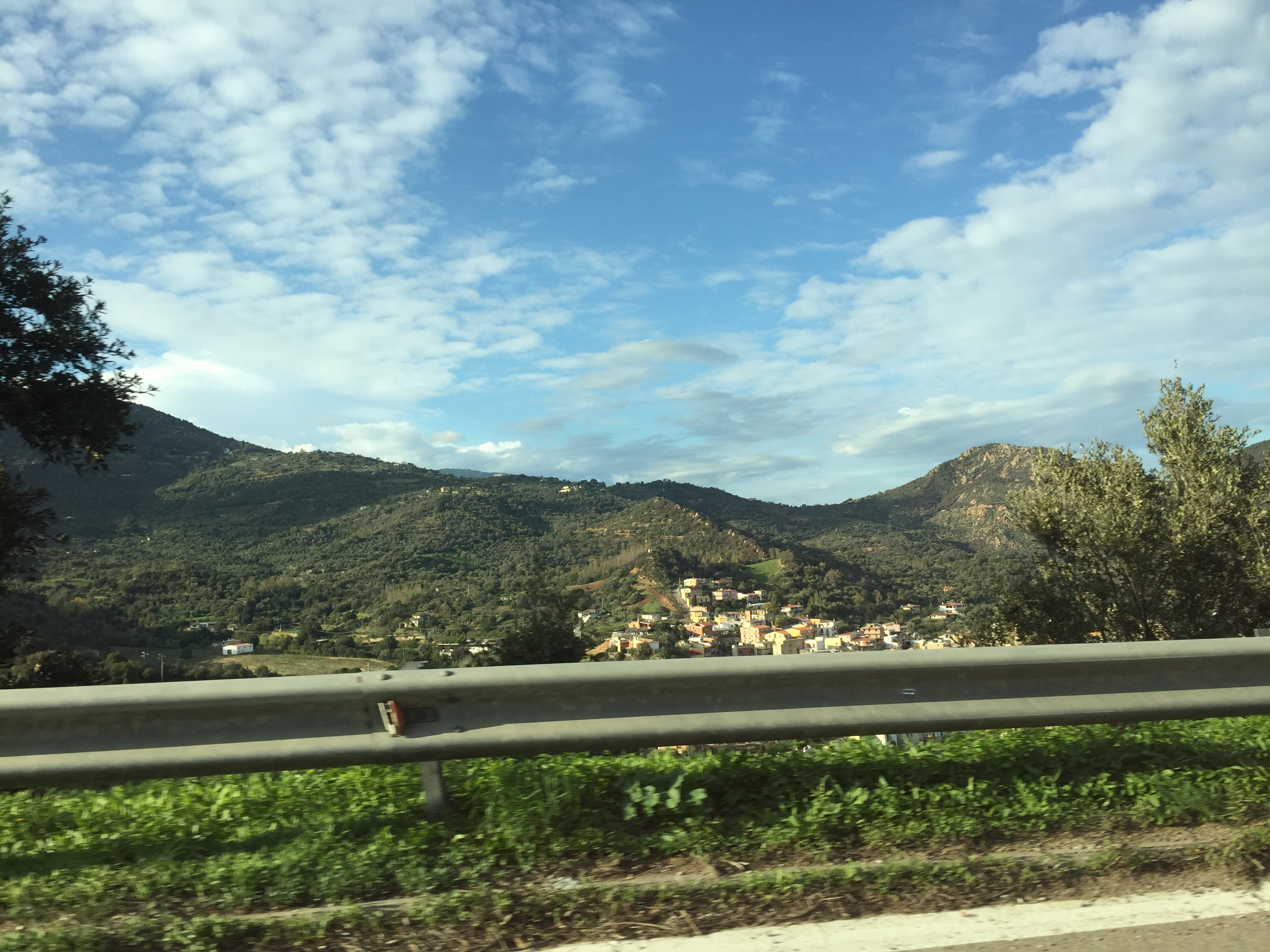
- View of Loceri

- Location within Sardinia
- Coordinates: 39°51′N 9°35′E
- Country: Italy
- Region: Sardinia
- Province: Ogliastra

Area
  - Total: 19.37 km^{2} (7.48 sq mi)
- Elevation: 206 m (676 ft)

Population (2026)
  - Total: 1,345
  - Density: 69.44/km^{2} (179.8/sq mi)
- Time zone: UTC+1 (CET)
  - Summer (DST): UTC+2 (CEST)
- Postal code: 08040
- Dialing code: 0782

Loceri is a town and comune (municipality) in the Province of Ogliastra in the autonomous island region of Sardinia in Italy, located about 80 kilometres (50 mi) northeast of Cagliari and about 11 kilometres (7 mi) southwest of Tortolì. It has 1,345 inhabitants.

Loceri borders the municipalities of Bari Sardo, Ilbono, Lanusei, Osini, and Tertenia.

== Demographics ==
As of 2026, the population is 1,345, of which 48.9% are male, and 51.1% are female. Minors make up 15.2% of the population, and seniors make up 27.4%.

Historical population

Year	Pop.	±%
1861	948	—
1871	947	−0.1%
1881	1,055	+11.4%
1901	1,214	+15.1%
1911	1,330	+9.6%
1921	1,292	−2.9%
1931	1,421	+10.0%
1936	1,469	+3.4%

Year	Pop.	±%
1951	1,667	+13.5%
1961	1,786	+7.1%
1971	1,663	−6.9%
1981	1,594	−4.1%
1991	1,459	−8.5%
2001	1,336	−8.4%
2011	1,278	−4.3%
2021	1,279	+0.1%

Source: ISTAT

=== Immigration ===
As of 2025, immigrants make up 6.8% of the total population. The 5 largest foreign countries of birth are Germany, Senegal, Kyrgyzstan, France, and Brazil.
