= FNU =

FNU can refer to:

- Fiji National University
- Florida National University, in Hialeah, Florida, United States
- Frontier Nursing University, in Hyden, Kentucky, United States
- Fujian Normal University, in China
- Oristano-Fenosu Airport, in Sardinia, Italy
- First Name Unknown, a placeholder name for an unknown first name.
