= FlyOristano =

Italian regional airline

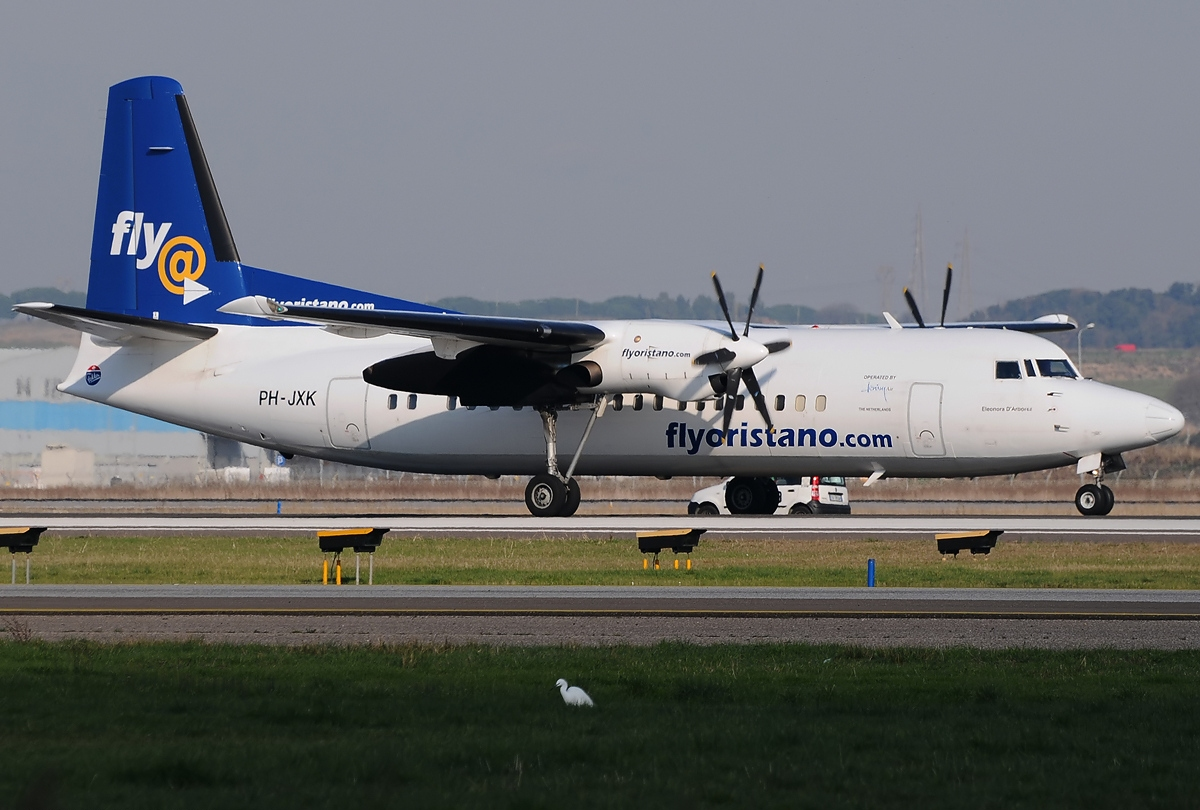
- Denim Air aircraft PX-JFK in FlyOristano livery
IATA	ICAO	Call sign
–	–	–
- Founded: 2010
- Ceased operations: 2011
- Hubs: Oristano-Fenosu Airport
- Fleet size: 2
- Headquarters: Oristano, Italy
- Website: http://www.flyoristano.com/

FlyOristano was an Italian regional airline based at Oristano-Fenosu Airport in Oristano, Sardinia. Flight operations began on 3 June 2010 and ended on 27 January 2011.

== History ==
The airline was founded as a partnership by the airport operator, Sogeaor, to provide passenger service from Oristano but was not licensed by the Italian Civil Aviation Authority and after starting service on 3 June 2010 following delays, was ordered to cease operations. Although an aircraft was painted in FlyOristano livery, services were actually provided by Denim Air. A second aircraft was introduced in mid-August but returned on 27 August; following monetary problems, the airline ceased operations after Denim Air withdrew services on 26 January 2011 and the regional authorities blocked hiring and increased control over the accounts. Sogeaor went into liquidation at the end of May 2011.

== Destinations ==
Italy

- Milan – Milan Malpensa Airport
- Oristano – Oristano-Fenosu Airport
- Pisa – Galileo Galilei Airport
- Rome – Leonardo da Vinci–Fiumicino Airport

== See also ==
- List of defunct airlines of Italy
