= Arbatax =

Arbatax Arbatassa (Sardinian)
- Frazione of Tortolì
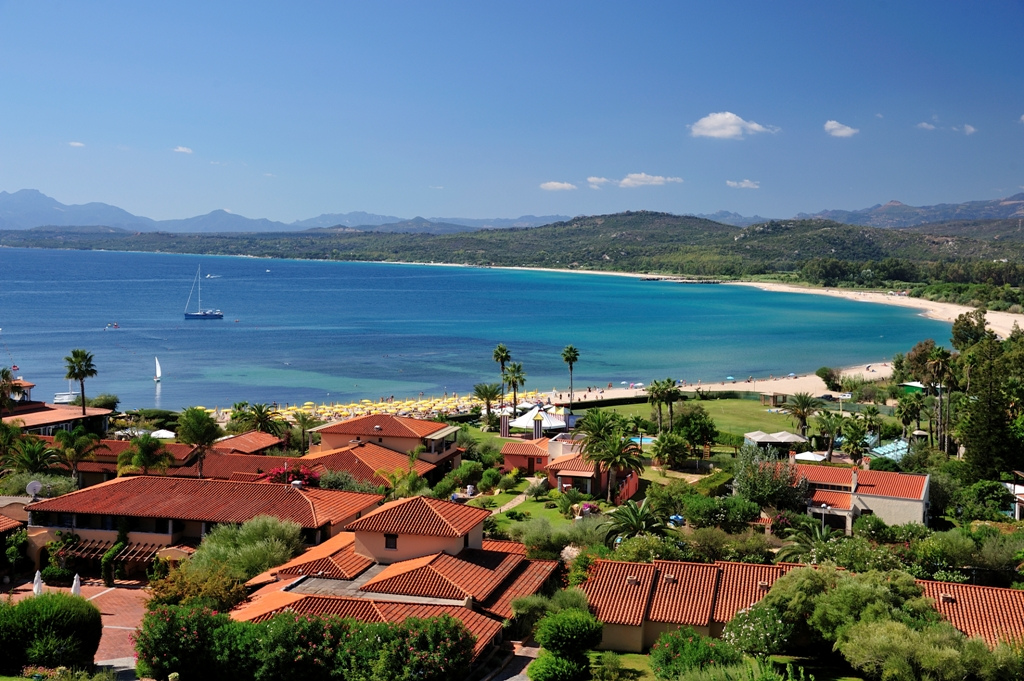

- Location in Sardinia
- Coordinates: 39.927°N 9.702°E
- Country: Italy
- Region: Sardinia
- County: Municipality of Tortolì
- City: Tortolì

Population
  - Total: 5,000
- Postal code: 08048

Arbatax (Italian pronunciation: [arbaˈtaks]; Sardinian: Arbatassa) is the largest hamlet (frazione) of Tortolì, Sardinia, in Italy, with a population of almost 5,000 inhabitants.

== History ==
The origin of the name Arbatax is uncertain. According to German linguist Max Leopold Wagner, it is derived from an Arabic word, which means "14th Tower", and refers to the nearby watchtower built by the Spaniards to protect the territory from the incursion of Arab pirates.

This theory is nowadays denied because it has no logical coherence and no historical or cultural connection with Sardinia: the linguist Massimo Pittau believes that it derives from the Latin arbutus, "strawberry tree", a common plant in the area and which gave rise to other Sardinian toponyms, since the location in the Sardinian language is written Arbatassa not Arbatax.

The founders of Arbatax were Campanian fishermen from the island of Ponza, located in Lazio, close to the coast of the Italian Peninsula.

The location assumed importance in the 1960s after the construction of the main Sardinian paper mill.

== Geography ==
The town is situated by the Tyrrhenian Sea, 5 km east of Tortolì.

=== Climate ===
Climate data for Arbatax (Cape Bellavista) (1991–2020)
Month	Jan	Feb	Mar	Apr	May	Jun	Jul	Aug	Sep	Oct	Nov	Dec	Year
Record high °C (°F)	24.0 (75.2)	27.0 (80.6)	31.4 (88.5)	29.4 (84.9)	31.2 (88.2)	38.4 (101.1)	39.8 (103.6)	40.8 (105.4)	36.4 (97.5)	31.0 (87.8)	26.8 (80.2)	27.0 (80.6)	40.8 (105.4)
Mean daily maximum °C (°F)	14.2 (57.6)	14.6 (58.3)	16.7 (62.1)	19.2 (66.6)	23.0 (73.4)	27.6 (81.7)	30.9 (87.6)	31.5 (88.7)	27.5 (81.5)	23.4 (74.1)	18.4 (65.1)	15.2 (59.4)	21.8 (71.2)
Daily mean °C (°F)	11.1 (52.0)	11.2 (52.2)	12.9 (55.2)	15.2 (59.4)	18.6 (65.5)	23.0 (73.4)	26.1 (79.0)	26.8 (80.2)	23.2 (73.8)	19.6 (67.3)	15.2 (59.4)	12.2 (54.0)	17.9 (64.2)
Mean daily minimum °C (°F)	8.1 (46.6)	7.9 (46.2)	9.5 (49.1)	11.5 (52.7)	14.8 (58.6)	18.8 (65.8)	21.8 (71.2)	22.5 (72.5)	19.3 (66.7)	16.2 (61.2)	12.3 (54.1)	9.3 (48.7)	14.3 (57.7)
Record low °C (°F)	−1.4 (29.5)	−6.6 (20.1)	1.0 (33.8)	5.2 (41.4)	6.4 (43.5)	0.0 (32.0)	15.6 (60.1)	14.6 (58.3)	11.4 (52.5)	7.4 (45.3)	2.2 (36.0)	−1.6 (29.1)	−6.6 (20.1)
Average precipitation mm (inches)	39.5 (1.56)	28.8 (1.13)	33.9 (1.33)	37.6 (1.48)	22.5 (0.89)	8.2 (0.32)	5.0 (0.20)	13.7 (0.54)	41.3 (1.63)	57.1 (2.25)	64.0 (2.52)	56.7 (2.23)	408.4 (16.08)
Average precipitation days (≥ 1.0 mm)	4.4	3.6	4.4	4.5	3.7	1.6	1.0	1.7	4.3	4.4	5.4	5.2	44.1
Average relative humidity (%)	70.3	68.1	69.6	69.8	69.6	68.8	68.6	69.1	69.2	71.4	70.7	69.5	69.6
Mean monthly sunshine hours	160.0	180.0	212.7	231.3	281.5	316.8	341.0	316.5	235.2	206.5	160.2	160.0	2,801.6
Source: NOAA

== Transport ==
The port is used by ferries to and fro Civitavecchia and Olbia, and is also monopolized by the marine construction company Intermare, which builds gas rigs and vessels. The marina is one of the cheapest in Sardinia.

The town is connected to Lanusei and Cagliari by a narrow gauge railway, today used for touristic purposes, owned by Ferrovie della Sardegna.

The closest airport is the Tortolì Airport, about 4 km from the town.

== Economy ==
Today, the economy is focused on tourism and industry. Arbatax is home to a factory dedicated to the building of oil platforms, controlled by the Italian oil and gas industry contractor Saipem. Mussels are farmed in the nearby lagoon and fresh fish are on sale from the fishing cooperative. The red rocks are a tourist attraction.

== Gallery ==
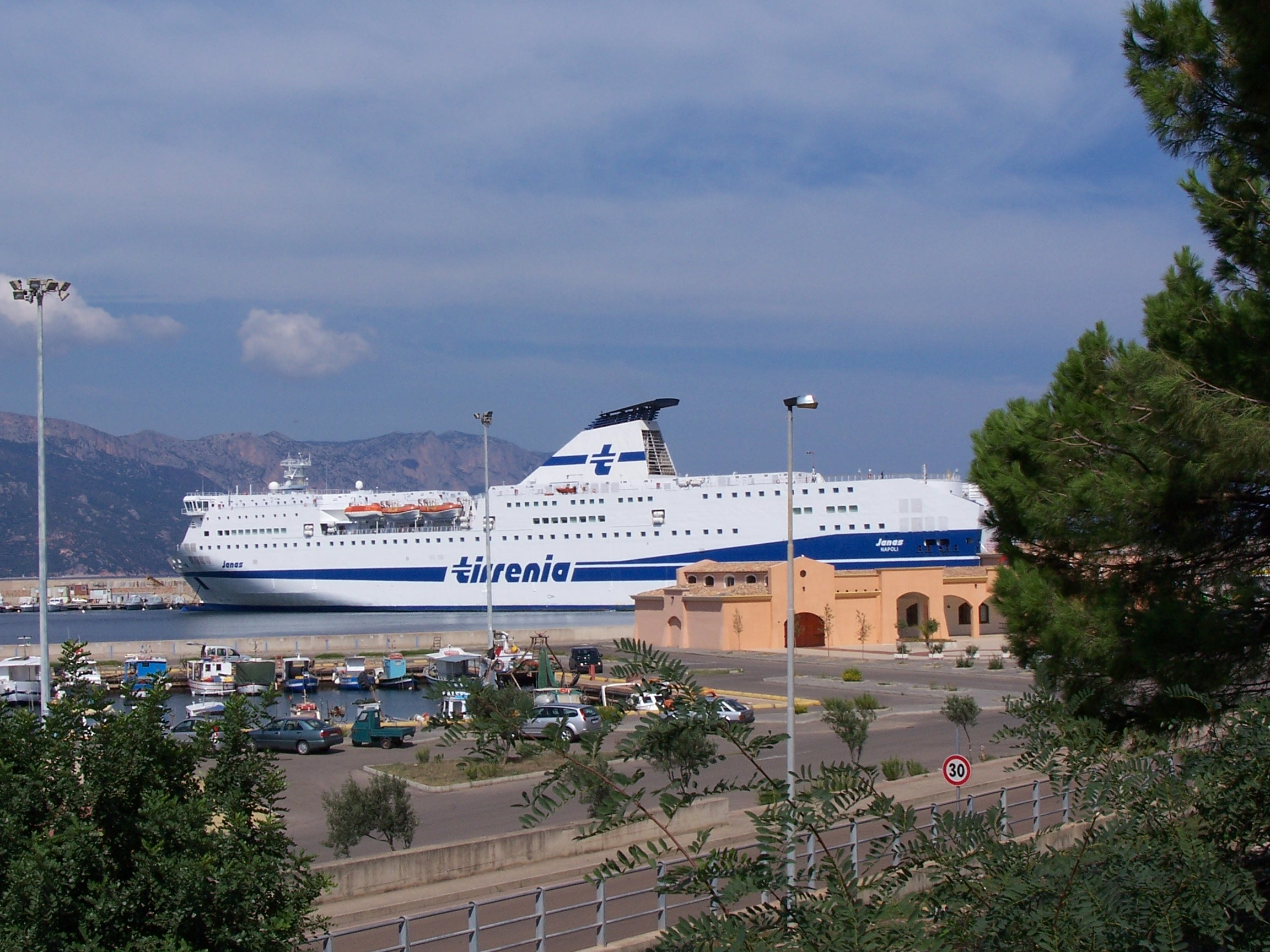
Port

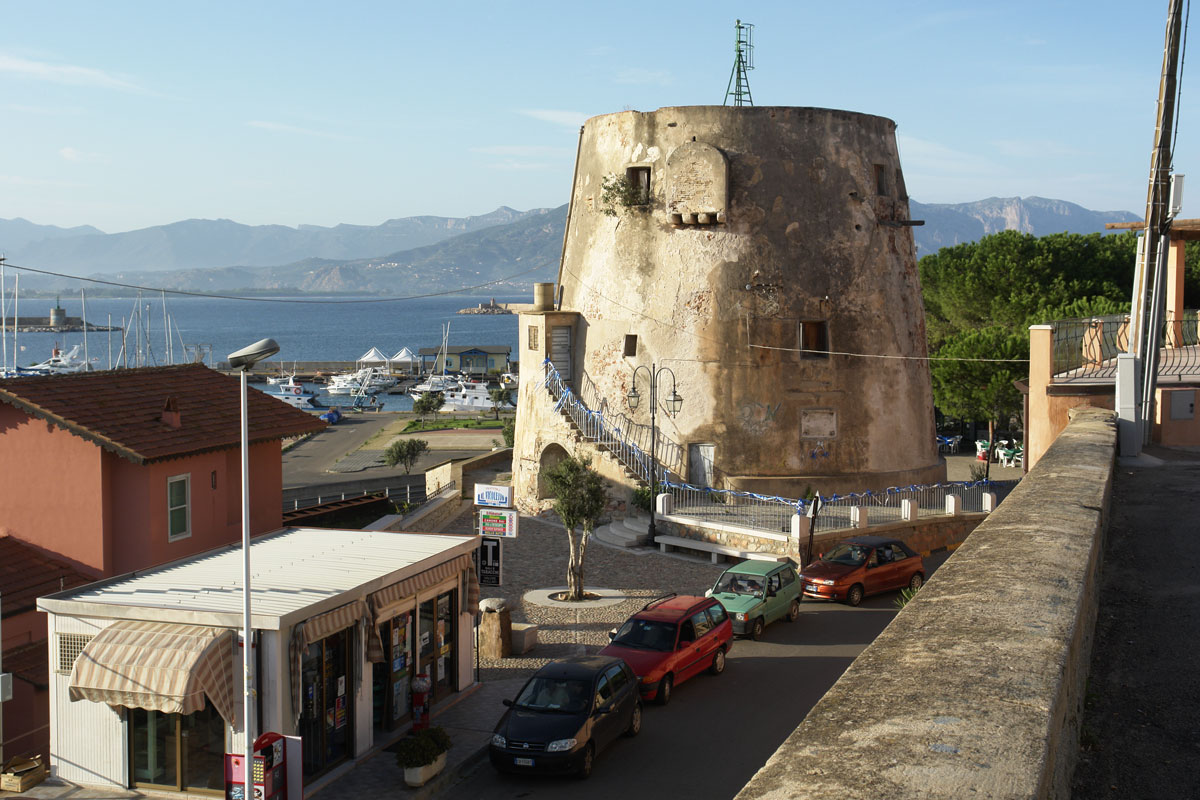
Spanish tower

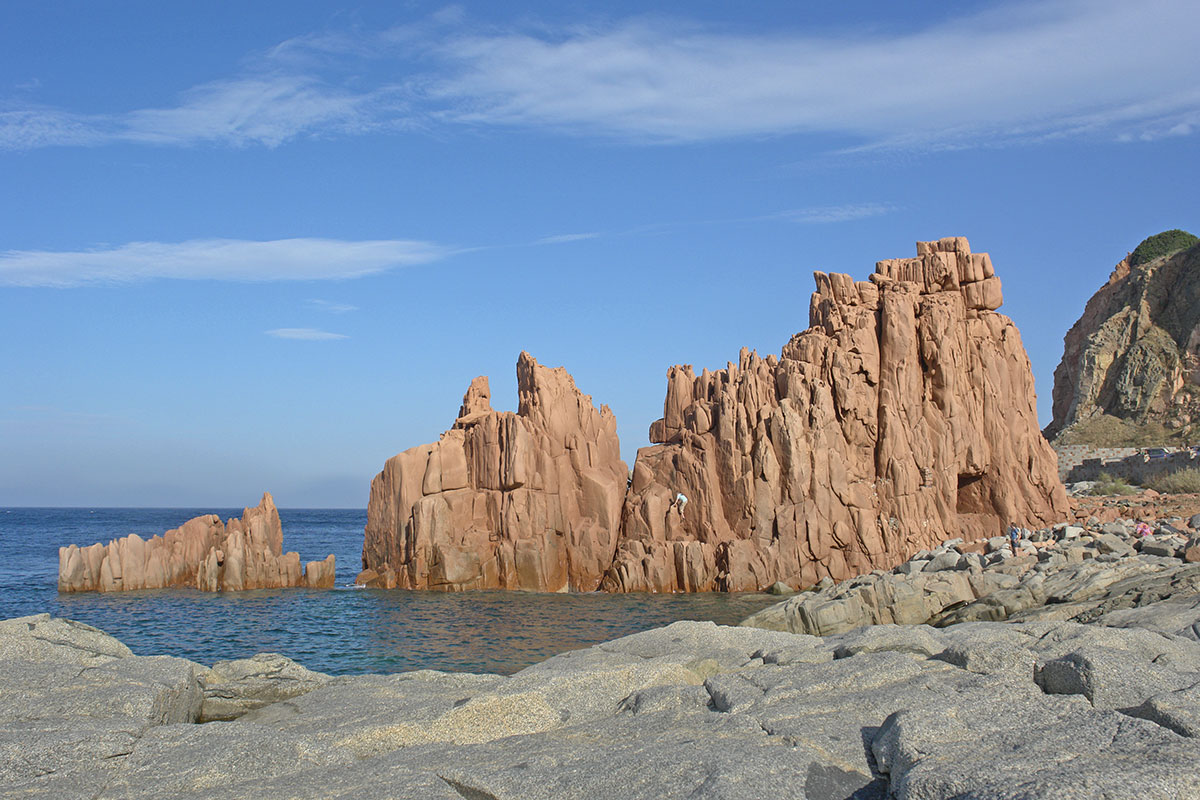
Beach of Rocce Rosse

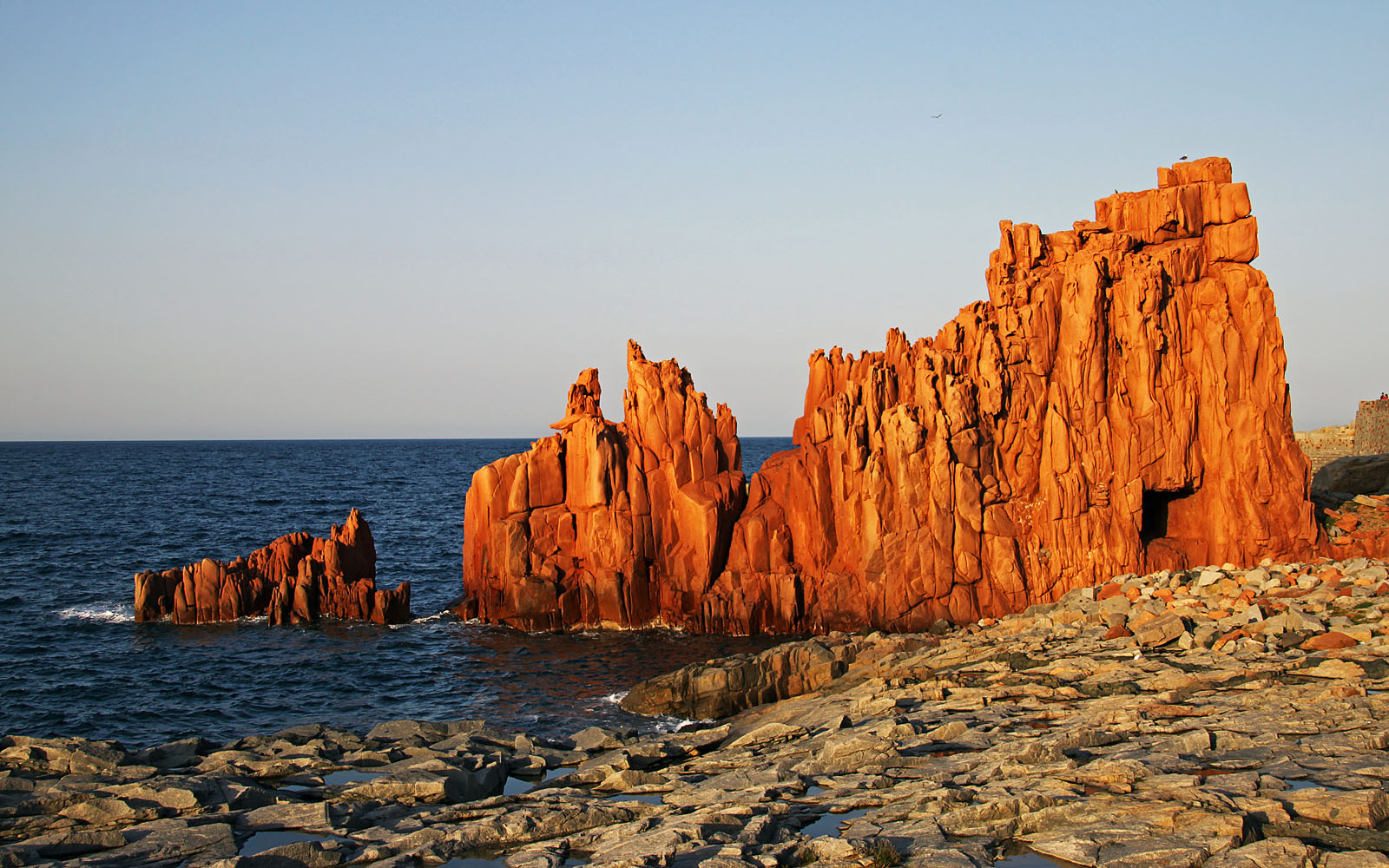
Rocce Rosse / Red Rocks

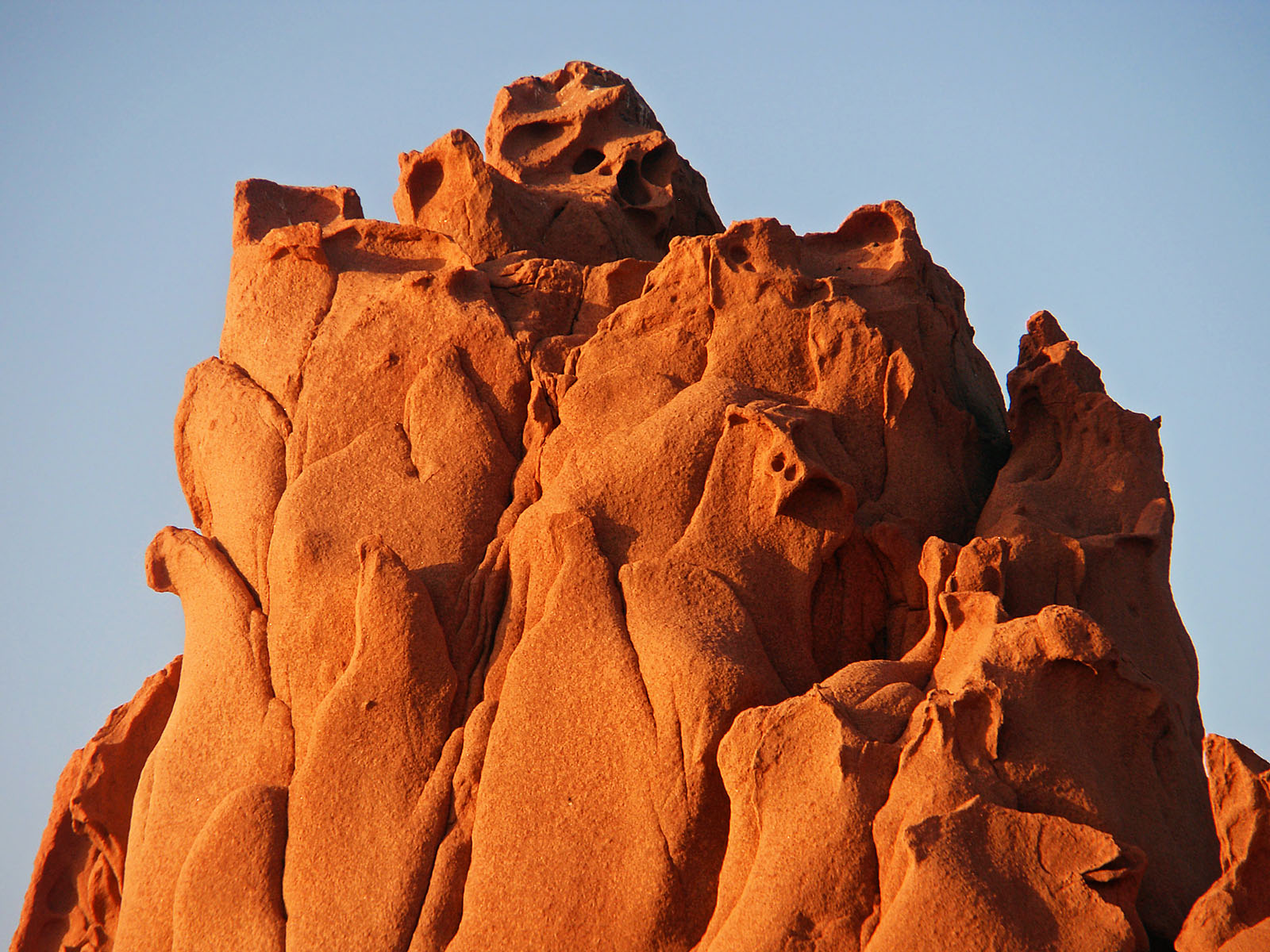
Red Rocks - detail

== See also ==
- Tortolì
- Nuoro
- Tourist destinations of Sardinia
- Tirrenia di Navigazione
