= Ravenna Airport =

Airport in Ravenna, Italy

- IATA: RAN; ICAO: LIDR

Summary
- Airport type: Public
- Operator: ENAC
- Serves: Ravenna, Emilia-Romagna, Italy
- Elevation AMSL: 222 m / 728 ft
- Coordinates: 44°21′52″N 012°13′32″E

Map
- Location of the airport in Italy

Runways
Direction	Length		Surface
Direction	m	ft	Surface
07/25	1,200	3,937	Asphalt
- Sources: GCM, STV

Ravenna Airport (Italian: Aeroporto di Ravenna) (IATA: RAN, ICAO: LIDR) (also known as Ravenna - La Spreta Airport) is an airport serving the locality of Ravenna, in the Emilia-Romagna province of Italy.

== See also ==
- List of airports in Italy
