= Lanusei =

Lanusei Lanusèi (Sardinian)
- Comune
- Comune di Lanusei
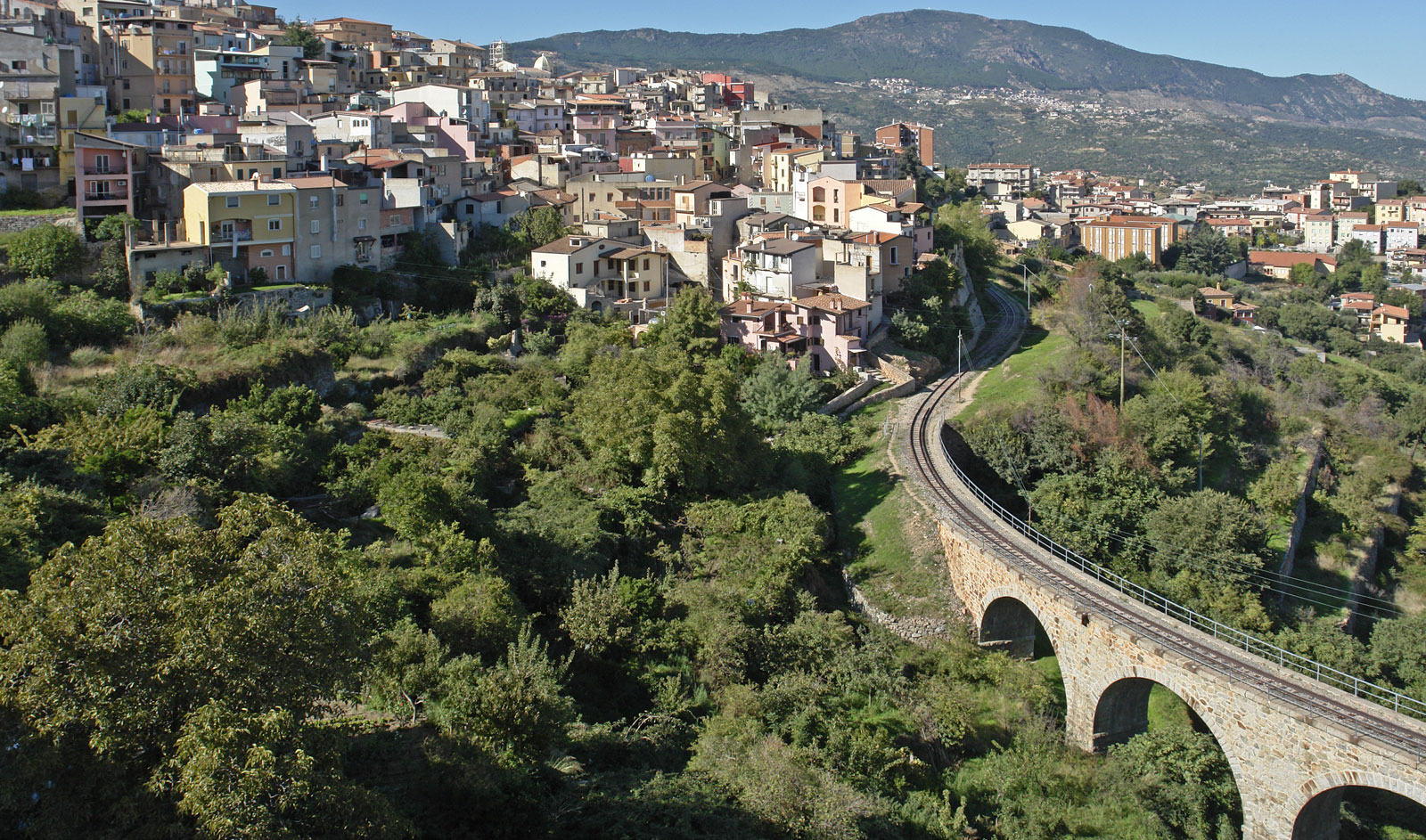
- View of Lanusei

- Coat of arms

- Location within Sardinia
- Coordinates: 39°53′N 09°33′E
- Country: Italy
- Region: Sardinia
- Province: Ogliastra

Area
  - Total: 53.17 km^{2} (20.53 sq mi)
- Elevation: 595 m (1,952 ft)

Population (2026)
  - Total: 4,881
  - Density: 91.80/km^{2} (237.8/sq mi)
- Demonym: Lanuseini
- Time zone: UTC+1 (CET)
  - Summer (DST): UTC+2 (CEST)
- Postal code: 08045
- Dialing code: 0782
- Patron saint: Mary Magdalene

Lanusei (Italian: [lanuˈzɛi]; Sardinian: Lanusèi) is a town and comune (municipality) which along with Tortolì is a co-capital of the Province of Ogliastra in the autonomous island region of Sardinia in Italy, located about 80 kilometres (50 mi) northeast of Cagliari and about 10 kilometres (6.2 mi) southwest of Tortolì. It has 4,881 inhabitants.

Lanusei borders the municipalities of Arzana, Bari Sardo, Cardedu, Elini, Gairo, Ilbono, Jerzu, Loceri, Osini, and Tertenia.

== Demographics ==
As of 2026, the population is 4,881, of which 49.1% are male, and 50.9% are female. Minors make up 11.8% of the population, and seniors make up 29.9%.

Historical population

Year	Pop.	±%
1861	2,421	—
1871	2,394	−1.1%
1881	2,569	+7.3%
1901	3,250	+26.5%
1911	3,631	+11.7%
1921	3,498	−3.7%
1931	3,814	+9.0%
1936	4,177	+9.5%

Year	Pop.	±%
1951	4,853	+16.2%
1961	5,449	+12.3%
1971	5,713	+4.8%
1981	6,360	+11.3%
1991	6,356	−0.1%
2001	5,841	−8.1%
2011	5,492	−6.0%
2021	5,091	−7.3%

Source: ISTAT

=== Immigration ===
As of 2025, immigrants make up 5.5% of the total population. The 5 largest foreign countries of birth are Germany, Argentina, Nigeria, Brazil, and France.

=== Climate ===
According to the Köppen climate classification, Lanusei experiences a hot-summer Mediterranean climate (Csa).
