= Reggio Emilia Airport =

Reggio Emilia Airport Aeroporto di Reggio Emilia
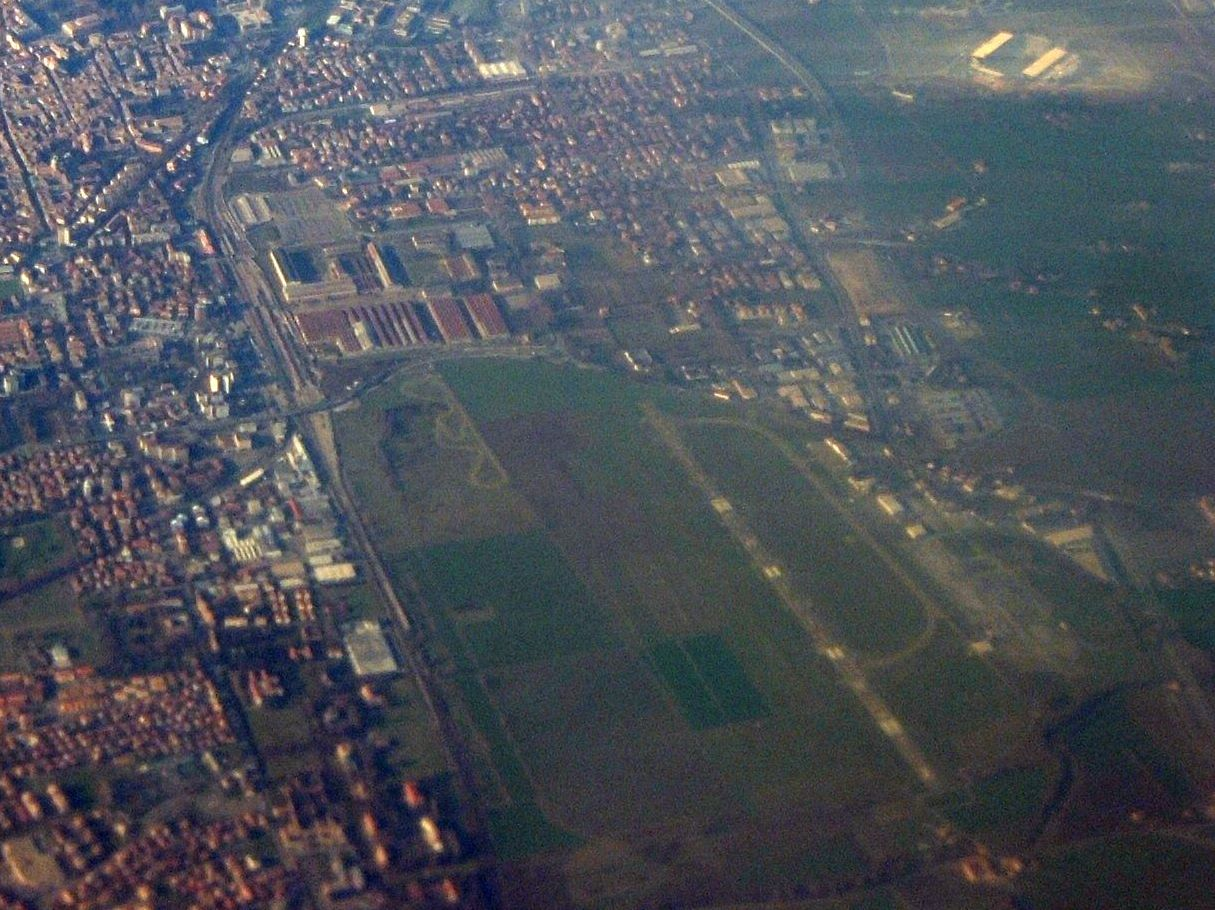
- IATA: N/A; ICAO: LIDE

Summary
- Serves: Reggio Emilia, Italy
- Location: Reggio Emilia, Emilia-Romagna, Italy
- Coordinates: 44°41′56″N 10°39′45″E
- Interactive map of Reggio Emilia Airport

Runways
Direction	Length		Surface
Direction	ft	m	Surface
11/29		1,210	Asphalt

Reggio Emilia Airport (Italian: Aeroporto di Reggio Emilia (ICAO: LIDE) is a third level airport located 1.5 km east of the city of Reggio Emilia, Italy.

== History ==
=== Post-war period to present day ===
In 2022 the airport underwent several redevelopment and safety changes regarding the buildings.

== Activities ==
There are two flight schools: the Reggio Emilia aeroclub, founded in 1947 for general aviation aircraft; and the Top Gun Fly School established in 2005 for recreational sport flying.
