= Piacenza Air Base =

Piacenza-San Damiano Air Base
- IATA: QPZ; ICAO: LIMS

Summary
- Airport type: Military
- Location: Piacenza
- Elevation AMSL: 456 ft / 139 m
- Coordinates: 44°54′47″N 009°43′24″E

Map
- Location in Italy

Runways
Direction	Length		Surface
Direction	ft	m	Surface
12/30	9,828	2,996	Asphalt
- Sources: World Aero Data

Piacenza-San Damiano Air Base (ICAO: LIMS) was a military airport located in Piacenza, Emilia-Romagna, Italy. It was closed on 1 September 2017.

== History ==
Piacenza Airfield began construction in 1936 for use by Regia Aeronautica as a bomber base and training field. It was opened on 28 March, 1938. In autumn of 1941, the Luftwaffe large took control over the airfield and began using it as training and transit base for aircraft flying to and from the Mediterranean theater. By the end of 1942, Piacenza Airfield was utilized as a principal staging base for bombers in Italy, and became a major operational base by fall 1943. In May 1944, three major allied attacks rendered Piacenza Airfield unserviceable, causing all stationed units to move out with their remaining aircraft.

== See also ==
- List of airports in Italy
