= Tortolì Airport =

Italian airport

Tortolì Airport Aeroporto di Tortolì
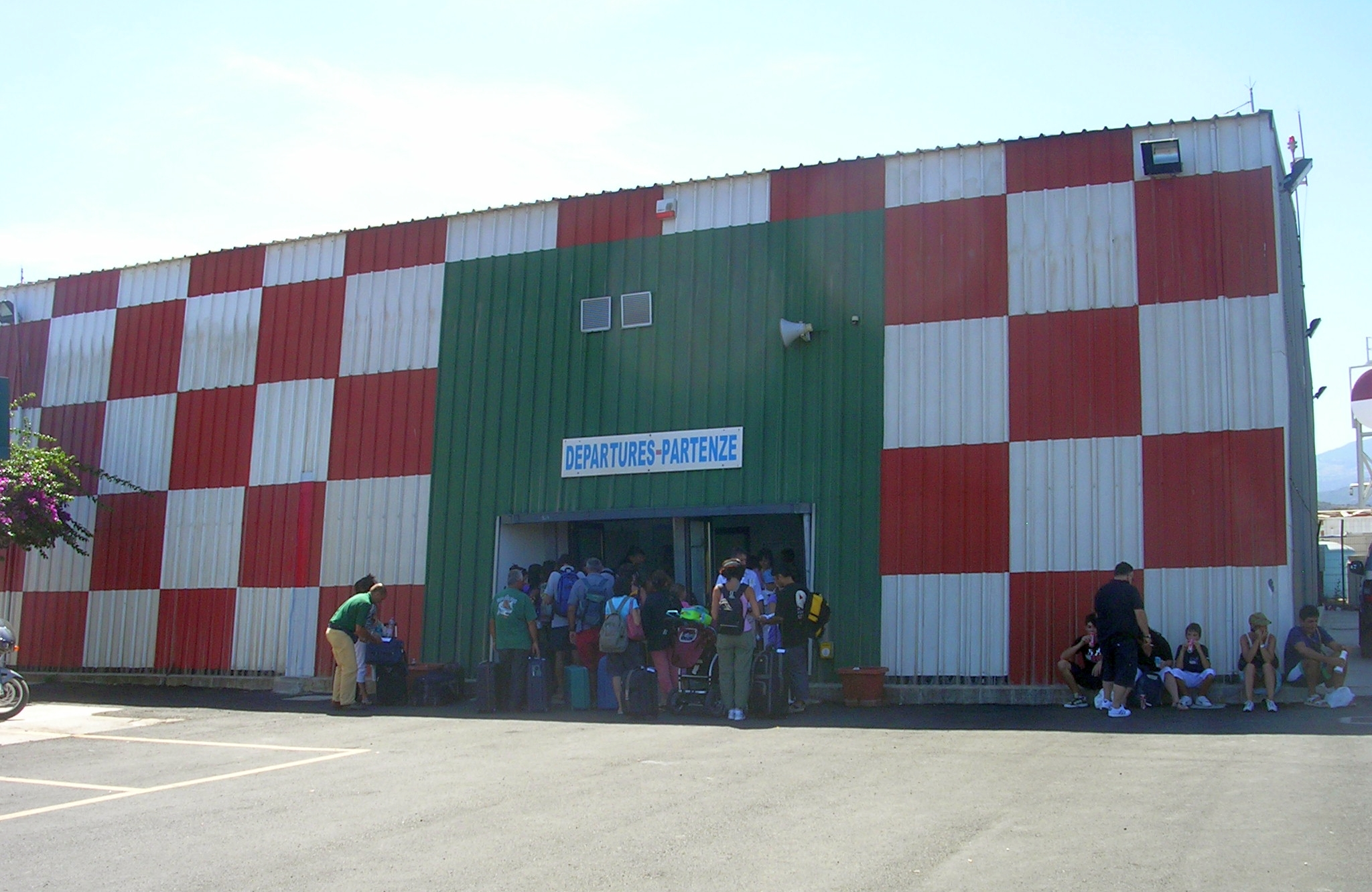
- IATA: TTB; ICAO: LIET

Summary
- Airport type: Public
- Owner: Aliarbatax srl
- Operator: Aliarbatax srl
- Serves: Tortolì, Italy
- Elevation AMSL: 24 ft (7.3 m)
- Coordinates: 39°55′00″N 09°41′00″E
- Website: AeroportoTortoli.eu

Map
- Location within Italy

Runways
Direction	Length		Surface
Direction	ft	m	Surface
12/30	4,731	1,442	Asphalt

Tortolì Airport, also known as Tortolì-Arbatax airport (IATA: TTB, ICAO: LIET) is a regional airport, located in the Province of Nuoro, in central east of Sardinia, Italy. It is located 140 kilometres (87 mi)from Cagliari and 100 km (62 mi) from Nuoro and operated by Aliarbatax srl.

== History ==
The airport was built in the 60's, with a grass runway, as logistical and technical support for the near Arbatax paper mill. The mill closed in 1986. In 1975, a 1,188-metre (3,898 ft) asphalt runway, a hangar and a control tower were built.

Between 1986 and 1990, regional airline Air Sardinia managed the airport, offering flights to Olbia, Alghero and Cagliari and charters outside of Sardinia.

The airfield closed in 1990. In 1993, a group of local entrepreneurs built a terminal and offered seasonal charter flights (June, July, September, October)ith regional airlines with aircraft such as BAe 146, Bombardier Q400 and ATR72. Annual traffic reached 44,412 passengers in 1998 and 42,655 in 2004.

After the runway extension to 1,442 metres (4,731 ft) in 2008 and modernisation of the terminal in 2010, the airport reopened in 2010 for Meridiana flights connecting the airport with main Italian airports in June to mid-September,and in August–October 2011 with flights to northern Italy, Switzerland an Austria. The airport closed after the departure of an ATR42 to Rome on 10 October 2011.

In 2021, the Industrial Consortium, owner of the Aliarbatax company holding 100% of the airport's shares, started plans to obtain authorisation from ENAC to reopen the airport for general aviation, with aircraft not exceeding 5,700 kg (12,600 lb) MTOW and 12 passengers, in summer 2021. Initial plans for 2022 included the airport to offer commercial flights on aircraft up to 100 seats.

On 28 April 2022, ENAC gave the authorisation to reopen the airport for general aviation while plans to offer flights on 100-seat aircraft were moved into summer 2023.

In mid-June 2023 the airport opened to general aviation traffic. Current plans include establishing the airport as a base for firefighting operations in the Sardinia region with the Canadair aircraft, and helicopter rescue flights as well as aerospace experimentation with DASS (the Sardinian Aerospace District). No air traffic service or radio frequency are available. Pilots are required to submit PPR (Prior Permission Request, or Prior Permission Required) via a website form or phone call in advance. Contacts and operational data are available on the airport official website.

== Statistics ==
	Passengers	Aircraft movements	Cargo (tonnes)
1998	44,412	923	0
1999	33,266	660	0
2000	37,039	906	0
2001			
2002			
2003			
2004	42,655		
2005			
2006	26,083		
Sources: 1998-2000: ENAC, 2004: Regione Autonoma della Sardegna, 2006: ENAC.
