= Olina, Italy =

Coordinates: 44°18′18″N 10°46′56″E

Olina
- Frazione
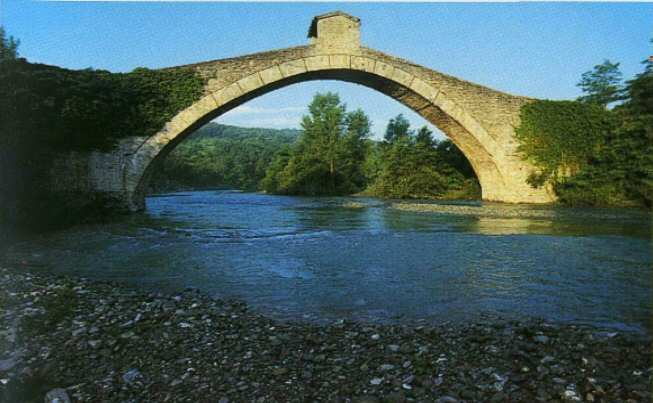
- The Bridge of Olina in 2005
- Interactive map of Olina
- Country: Italy
- Region: Emilia-Romagna
- Province: Modena
- Comune: Pavullo nel Frignano

Government
  - Body: Giunta Comunale di Pavullo nel Frignano
- Demonym: Olinesi
- Postal code: 41026
- Dialling code: 0536

Olina is a village in the region of Emilia-Romagna in northern Italy. Administratively, it is a frazione of the comune of Pavullo nel Frignano in the province of Modena.
