= Pavullo nel Frignano Airport =

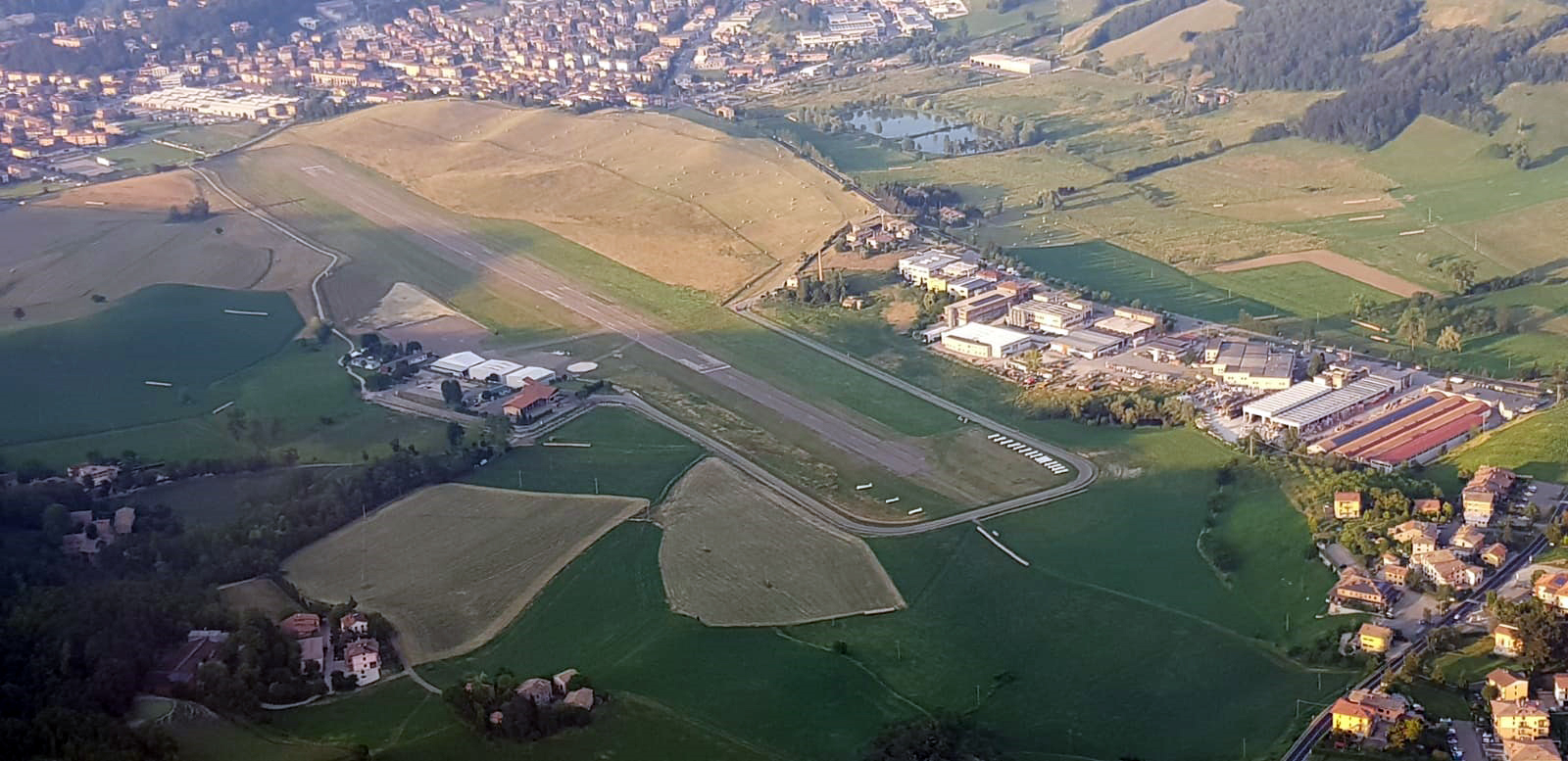
- IATA: None; ICAO: LIDP

Summary
- Airport type: Military (until 1949), Civil
- Owner: Aero Club Pavullo
- Operator: Italian Air Force
- Location: Pavullo nel Frignano
- Built: 1927
- Elevation AMSL: 2,244 ft (684 m)
- Coordinates: 44°19′20″N 10°49′54″E
- Website: https://aeroclubpavullo.it/

Map
- Location in Emilia-Romagna LIDP (Italy)

Runways
Direction	Length		Surface
Direction	ft	m	Surface
02/20	3,904 x 75	1,190 x 23	Asphalt

"G. Paolucci" Airport (Italian: Aeroporto di Pavullo nel Frignano, ICAO: LIDP) is an Italian airport located in 'I Piani' in Pavullo, about 2 kilometres (1.2 mi) south of Pavullo nel Frignano, Italy. The airport is used for general aviation, business aviation, leisure and sport aviation activities, and for civil protection and rescue functions. Inside there is both a flight school for piloting gliders, and a motorized flight school for VDS equipment, basic and advanced, with the possibility of making preparatory flights to the teaching activity.

On the plant there is one of the four helicopter rescue bases of the Emilia-Romagna Region for Emergency and Emergency Health Transport - 118 - with the fixed presence of a BK117 / C2 aircraft; this base is the only one equipped with a winch (HEMS-HSR base) for intervention in inaccessible areas.

The radio frequency is 124.980 "Pavullo Radio" and the airport is open to traffic every day with local time 08:00 until the ephemeris for fixed-wing aircraft; it is open to traffic every day H24 for rotary wing aircraft. Beyond the time of the ephemeris for the operations a 30-minute notice is required.

== History ==
Luigi Teichfuss and Umberto Nannini, gliding enthusiasts, towards the beginning of the 1920s identified in the "I Piani di Pavullo" area an optimal location to host the future flying school, thanks to the particular morphology of the land and the favorable conditions weather. With the support of Italo Balbo and the Commanders Vincenzo Ghibellini and Guido Corni, work began on the construction of the airfield in 1923, destined shortly thereafter to host the first and most important School of Italy for Gliding. The first course of the "flying school" was held in 1927 and ended with 27 patented students. The airport thus became the reference point for the Italian Air Force throughout the Italian territory. In 1930 the first barracks was built for the Italian Air Force cadets, to host them during training courses as students of the Regia flight school without motor. On 2 July 1931, the Pavullo camp was recognized Airport with Royal Decree No. 1610 published in the Official Gazette, and was named in memory of Giulio Paolucci, an aviator who fell in 1928 on Pavullo's field. In the same year, the Pavullo school began to select and train future gliding instructors, civil and military specialists, and finally even winchers once the winch launch was designed and first used in Pavullo.

On 5 August 1944 Paolucci was totally destroyed by German troops during their retreat. The immediate post-war period thus marked a period of decline for the airport, and all the activities of the gliding school were transferred from Pavullo nel Frignano to Guidonia Montecelio at Guidonia airport, assuming the name of Airport / Group Command Sailing to Guidonia. Therefore, the Gliding Center assumes the rank and denomination of "Group". At this point, the entire Department, based on a structure very similar to that of a Stormo, operates with a dual role of "Flight School" as well as "logistical support" in favor of all the Entities co-located in the Base. Significantly contributes to the instructional process of the students of the Aeronautical Academy with an intense flight activity on Twin AstirMa

In 1955 the Pavullo Aero Club was born inside Pavullo Airport and, in the early sixties, the activities of the structure resumed, also thanks to the rediscovery of the territory by an active group of paratroopers and by an ever increasing glider movement. During the 1990s, the first gliding school with winch launch was founded, which still today represents excellence in the Italian flight scenario. Beginning in 2003, the redevelopment and upgrading works of the airport began, which are still taking place, making the infrastructure a reference point for Italy and Europe. The main works were the enlargement of the airport with the construction of a new 1200-meter asphalt runway, the aprons for aircraft, the aeronautical and reception logistics infrastructures (hangars, offices, bars, restaurant, and guesthouse), fuel distributors, and other aviation support facilities.

The Pavullo airport has maintained a close relationship with the Italian Army and the Italian Air Force, as a logistical support for the landing of Army and Air Force aircraft, due to its proximity to the Sestola Air Force Base, where the mountain meteorological aeronautical center of Monte Cimone-Sestola (CAMM) is located. The link with the Italian Air Force was further confirmed in 2015, when the Guidonia Instructor Officers went to Pavullo for training on the use of the winch, in order to bring this flight technique back into the programs didactic for the pilot students of the Italian Air Force.

== Technical data ==
The airport has 1 runway:

Runway Data (Metric)
Runway	Surface	Length	Width	TORA	TODA	ASDA	LDA
02	Asphalt	1,190 m	23 m	1,120 m	1,240 m	1,120 m	861 m
20	Asphalt	1,190 m	23 m	930 m	930 m	930 m	1,073 m

Runway Data (Imperial)
Runway	Surface	Length	Width	TORA	TODA	ASDA	LDA
02	Asphalt	3,904 ft	75 ft	3,674 ft	4,068 ft	3,674 ft	2,285 ft
20	Asphalt	3,904 ft	75 ft	3,051 ft	3,051 ft	3,051 ft	3,520 ft

The runway has recently been resurfaced (August 2019).
