= Pavullo nel Frignano =

- Comune
- Comune di Pavullo nel Frignano
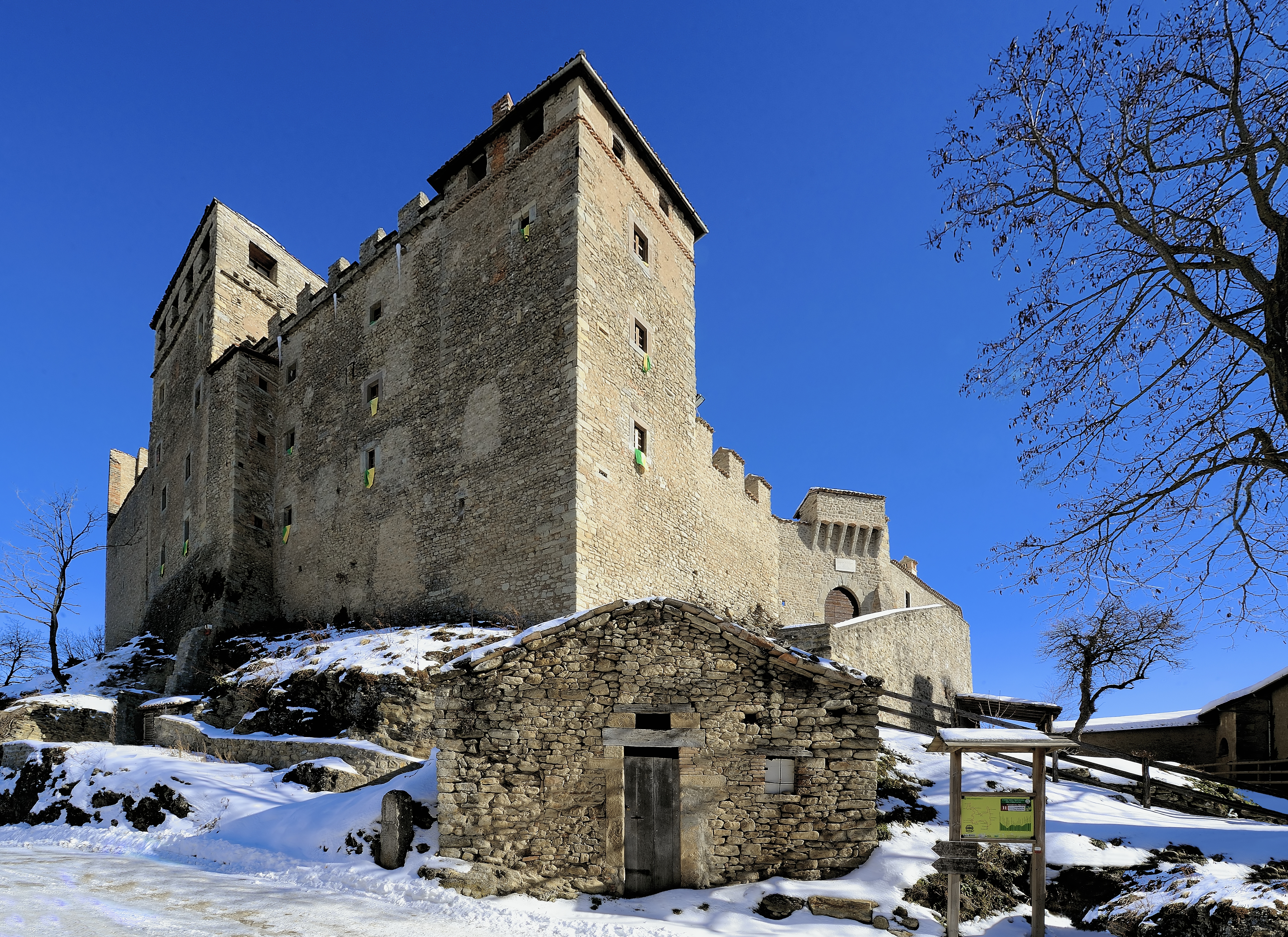
- Montecuccoli's Castle

- Coat of arms

- Location within Italy Location within Emilia-Romagna
- Coordinates: 44°20′N 10°50′E
- Country: Italy
- Region: Emilia-Romagna
- Province: Modena (MO)
- Frazioni: Benedello, Camatta, Castagneto, Coscogno, Crocette, Frassineti, Gaiato, Iddiano, Miceno, Montebonello, Montecuccolo, Monteobizzo, Montorso, Monzone, Niviano, Olina, Querciagrossa, Renno, Sant'Antonio, Sassoguidano, Verica

Government
  - Mayor: Davide Venturelli

Area
  - Total: 144.07 km^{2} (55.63 sq mi)
- Elevation: 682 m (2,238 ft)

Population (31 December 2017)
  - Total: 17,361
  - Density: 120.50/km^{2} (312.10/sq mi)
- Demonym: Pavullesi
- Time zone: UTC+1 (CET)
  - Summer (DST): UTC+2 (CEST)
- Postal code: 41026
- Dialing code: 0536
- Patron saint: St. Bartholomew
- Website: Official website

Pavullo nel Frignano (Frignanese: Pavóll) is a town and comune in the province of Modena, Emilia-Romagna, Italy, in the Modenese Apeninnes. It is home to the medieval Castle of Montecuccolo, birthplace of the 17th century condottiero Raimondo Montecuccoli, and of the pieve of San Giovanni Battista di Renno (8th-9th century AD). The town was extensively damaged during World War II due to its proximity to the Gothic Line.

The economy is mostly based on agriculture. The 2006 World Cup winning Italian footballer Luca Toni was born in Pavullo nel Frignano.

Pavullo nel Frignano Airport is in the comune.
