= Oristano-Fenosu Airport =

Oristano-Fenosu Ernesto Campanelli Airport Aeroporto di Oristano "E. Campanelli"
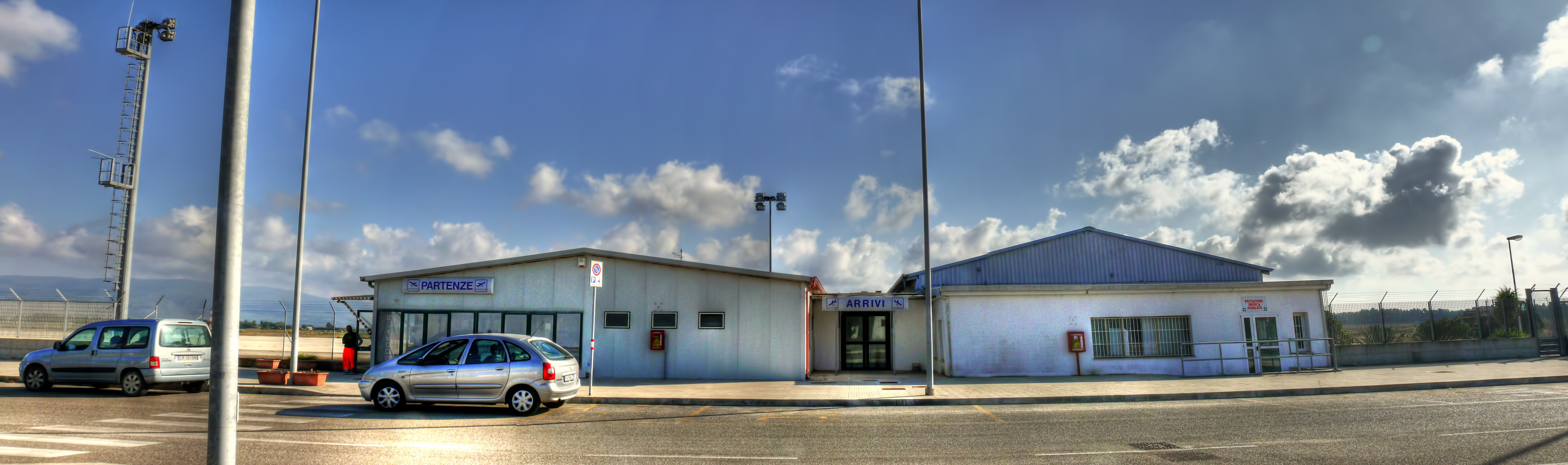
- IATA: FNU; ICAO: LIER

Summary
- Airport type: Public
- Serves: Oristano
- Location: Oristano, Italy
- Coordinates: 39°53′43″N 8°38′33″E
- Website: www.sogeaor.it
- Interactive map of Oristano-Fenosu Ernesto Campanelli Airport

Runways
Direction	Length		Surface
Direction	ft	m	Surface
14/32	3,934	1,199	Asphalt

Oristano-Fenosu Airport (IATA: FNU, ICAO: LIER) is a small regional airport in central western Sardinia, Italy.

It is in the farming village of Fenosu, approximately 3 kilometres (1.9 mi) east of the town of Oristano, and is lapped by highway 131, the island's most important road artery. It is only available to general aviation, and has no commercial flights, though it was the home base of the short-lived FlyOristano.

The runway was first built, for military use, in 1930. Its use ceased, then the Aeroclub of Orista began to use it again in the 1970s for sport parachuting among other things. In 1981 it was reopened to civil air traffic, and in 2005-06 to general aviation. In 2007 the airport was renamed for Ernesto Campanelli, an aviator from Oristano.
