= Tortolì =

Tortolì Tortolì / Tòrtuelie (Sardinian)
- Comune
- Comune di Tortolì
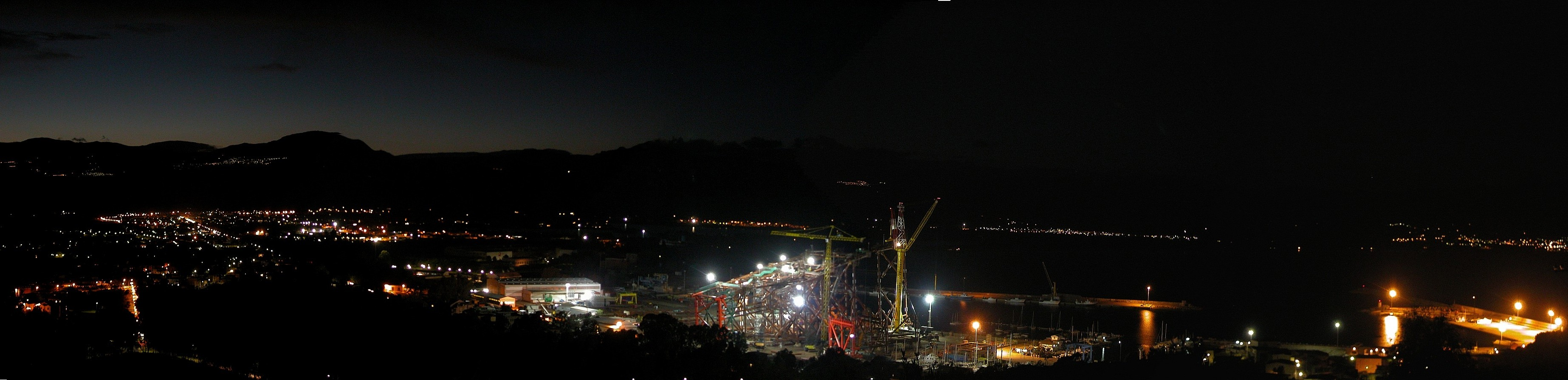
- View of Tortolì-Arbatax

- Coat of arms

- Location within Sardinia
- Coordinates: 39°56′N 09°39′E
- Country: Italy
- Region: Sardinia
- Province: Ogliastra
- Frazioni: Arbatax, Foxi Lioni, Is Tanas

Area
  - Total: 40.29 km^{2} (15.56 sq mi)
- Elevation: 13 m (43 ft)

Population (2026)
  - Total: 10,994
  - Density: 272.9/km^{2} (706.7/sq mi)
- Demonym: Tortoliesi
- Time zone: UTC+1 (CET)
  - Summer (DST): UTC+2 (CEST)
- Postal code: 08048
- Dialing code: 0782
- Patron saint: St. Andrew
- Saint day: November 30
- Website: Official website

Tortolì (Italian: [tortoˈli]; Sardinian: Tortolì or Tòrtuelie; Latin: Portus Ilii) is a town and municipality, which along with Lanusei is a co-capital of the Province of Ogliastra in the autonomous island region of Sardinia in Italy. With a population of 10,994, it is the largest municipality in the province and the 23rd-largest in Sardinia.

== History ==
=== Ancient history ===
The area of Tortolì was inhabited since the Neolithic and then frequented by the Phoenicians, Romans, Vandals, and the Byzantines. It was part of the giudicato of Cagliari between the 10th and 13th centuries.

During the Spanish period the town was the head of the County of Quirra.

=== Modern history ===
In 1807 Tortolì became head of a province consisting of 27 villages, but in 1921 lost the capital status in favour of Lanusei. In 1859 it was incorporated into the Province of Cagliari. In 1926 it was incorporated into the Province of Ogliastra.

In 1943 the port of Arbatax was bombed, killing 13 people.

== Geography ==
Tortolì is situated on the eastern coast of Sardinia. Its port and greatest hamlet is Arbatax, which has also an airport that once connected it to continental Italy and the European continent. To the north of it is Girasole and Lotzorai, to the west Villagrande Strisaili and Ilbono, and to the south Barisardo. To the east of the town is the Mediterranean Sea.

=== Climate ===
According to the Köppen climate classification, Tortolì experiences a hot-summer Mediterranean climate (Csa).

== Demographics ==
As of 2026, the population is 10,994, of which 49.4% are male, and 50.6% are female. Minors make up 13.4% of the population, and seniors make up 26.0%.

Historical population

| Year | Pop. | ±% |
|---|---|---|
| 1861 | 1,913 | — |
| 1871 | 1,776 | −7.2% |
| 1881 | 1,835 | +3.3% |
| 1901 | 2,105 | +14.7% |
| 1911 | 2,254 | +7.1% |
| 1921 | 2,280 | +1.2% |
| 1931 | 2,571 | +12.8% |
| 1936 | 2,763 | +7.5% |

| Year | Pop. | ±% |
|---|---|---|
| 1951 | 3,585 | +29.8% |
| 1961 | 4,588 | +28.0% |
| 1971 | 6,414 | +39.8% |
| 1981 | 8,033 | +25.2% |
| 1991 | 9,128 | +13.6% |
| 2001 | 9,973 | +9.3% |
| 2011 | 10,743 | +7.7% |
| 2021 | 11,024 | +2.6% |

Source: ISTAT

=== Immigration ===
As of 2025, immigrants make up 6.0% of the total population. The 5 largest foreign countries of birth are Germany, Romania, Pakistan, Morocco, and France.

== Sport ==
Tortolì 1953 is a football club in the 5th tier of Italian football, Eccellenza. Their highest performance came with a 17th place finish in 'Girone G' of the 4th tier of Italian football, Serie D. This saw the club be relegated back to the Eccellenza after finishing the season with 26 points, only 3 points ahead of 18th place San Teodoro. The club's website is https://www.tortolicalcio.it.
