= Tourism in Sardinia =

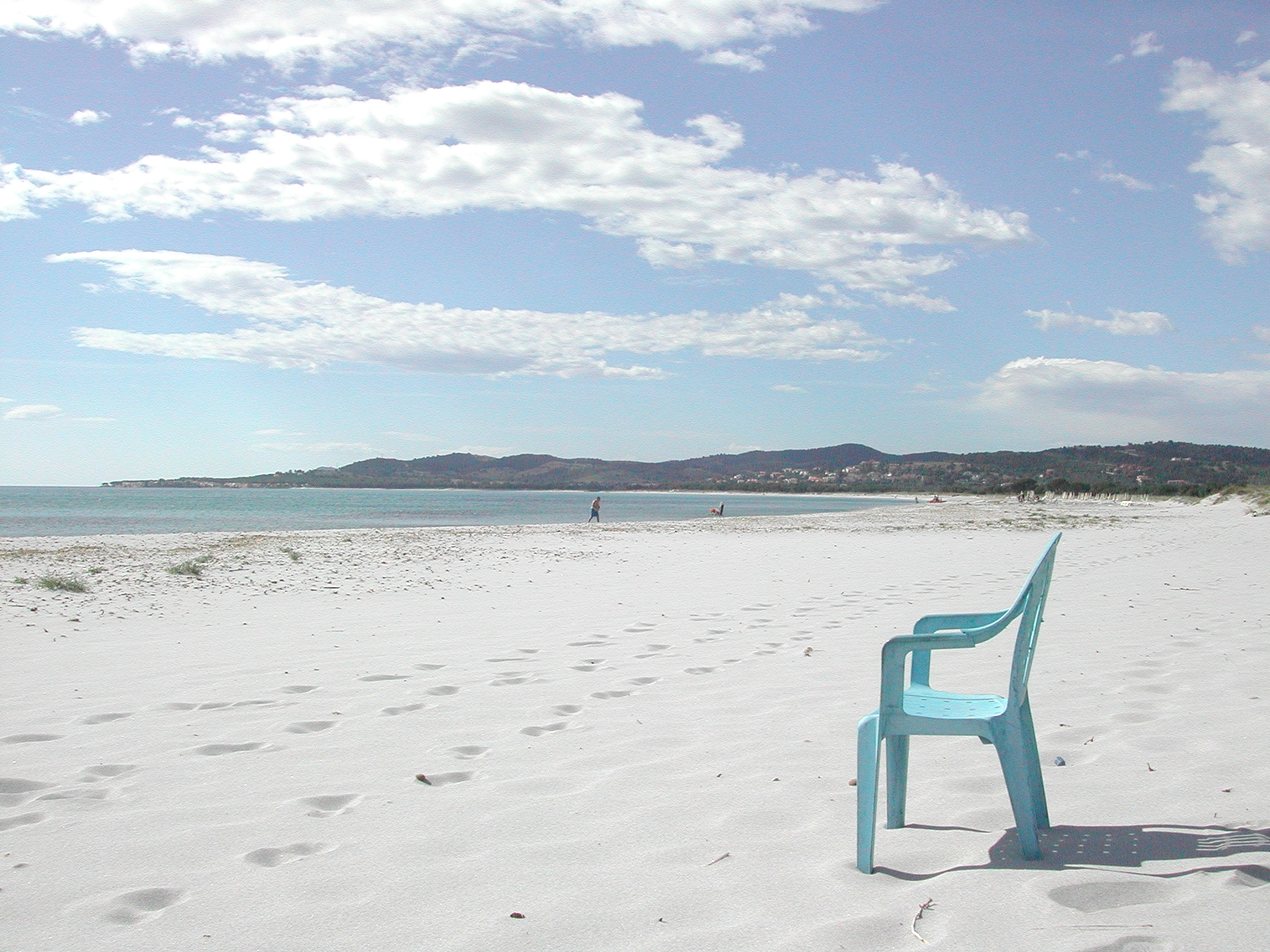
- La Caletta
- Time zone: UTC+1 (Central European Time)
- Area code: +39
- Website: Sardegnaturismo Official page

Sardinia is the second-largest island in the Mediterranean Sea (after Sicily and before Cyprus) and an autonomous region of Italy. Tourism in Sardinia is one of the fastest growing sectors of the regional economy. The island attracts more than a million tourists from both Italy (particularly from Lombardy, Piedmont, and Lazio), from the rest of Europe (especially from Germany and France), and, to a lesser degree, from the rest of the world. According to statistics, tourist arrivals in 2016 were 2.9 million people.

American travel magazine Travel + Leisure include Sardinia and Costa Smeralda in 50 Best Places to Travel in 2022.

== History ==
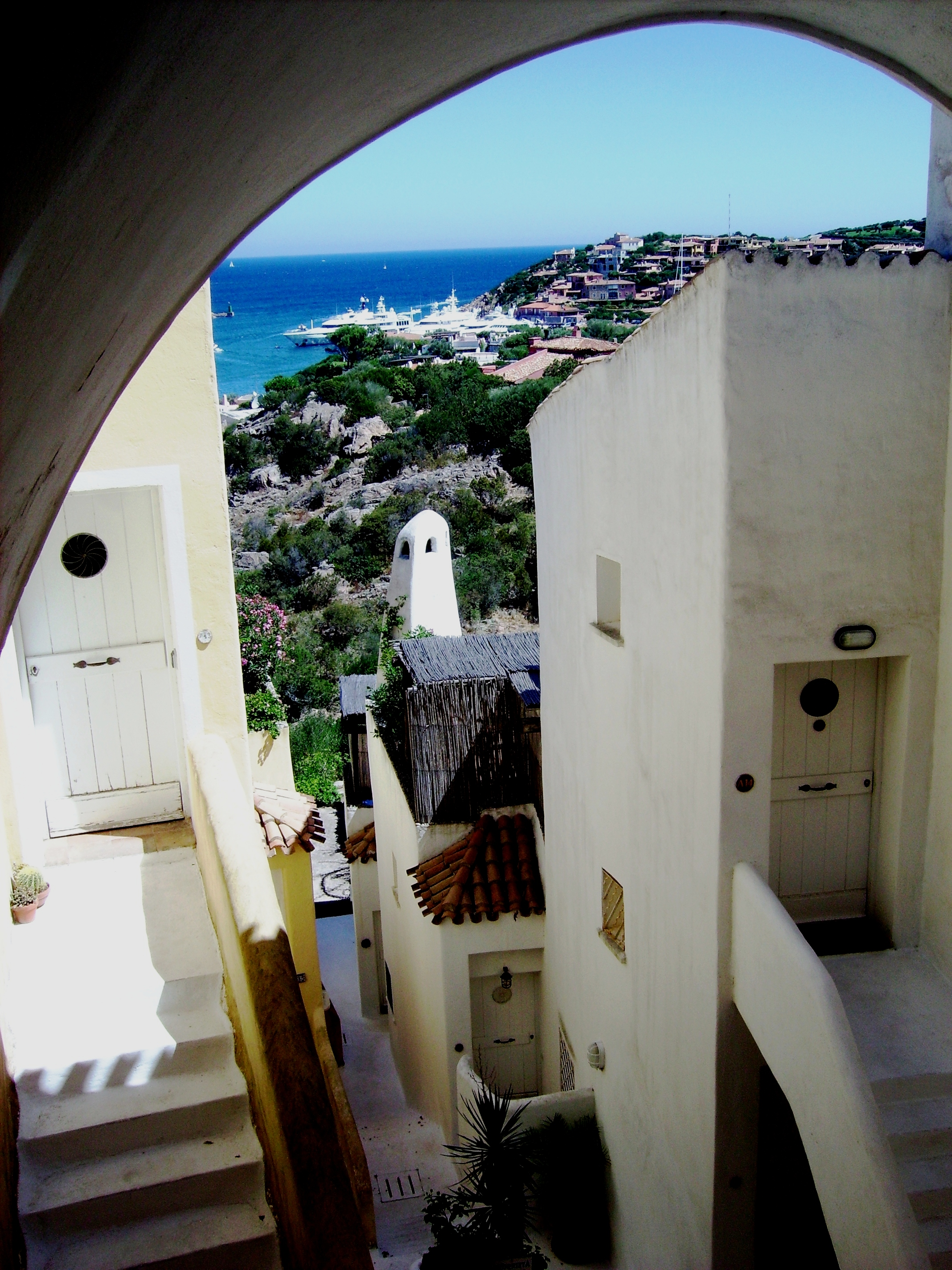
View of Porto Cervo

Modern tourism in Sardinia began in 1948, when the first investments and development plans were started in conjunction with the acquisition of autonomous region status and the definitive defeat of malaria along the coast. The first promotions and infrastructural achievements were implemented through the Sardinian Tourism Industries Organization (ESIT), which promoted and financed the construction of hotels, including the Miramar Hotel in Alghero (1953).

The growth of the tourism industry began in the early 1960s, when Porto Cervo was founded by the Aga Khan in Costa Smeralda at the municipality of Arzachena, which became the symbol of tourism development for the island. Architects such as Luigi Vietti, Michele Busiri Vici and Jacques Couelle contributed to the realization of the various developments. Porto Cervo was soon followed by Porto Rotondo, Romazzino, Cala di Volpe and Porto Raphael. As Costa Smeralda became more established among the international jet set, the race for the construction of tourist resorts began in many coastal towns on the island.

A myriad of other nearby developments with similar offerings followed, such as Baja Sardinia and Liscia di Vacca. The sector developed in the rest of Sardinia as well, until it became one of the main sectors of the island's economic activities.

== Sardinian territories ==
The island is subdivided into several historical regions, rich in history and traditions and sometimes different languages. Here are the most well-known ones:

=== South ===
==== Cagliaritano, Trexenta, Marmilla, Sarcidano, Sarrabus ====
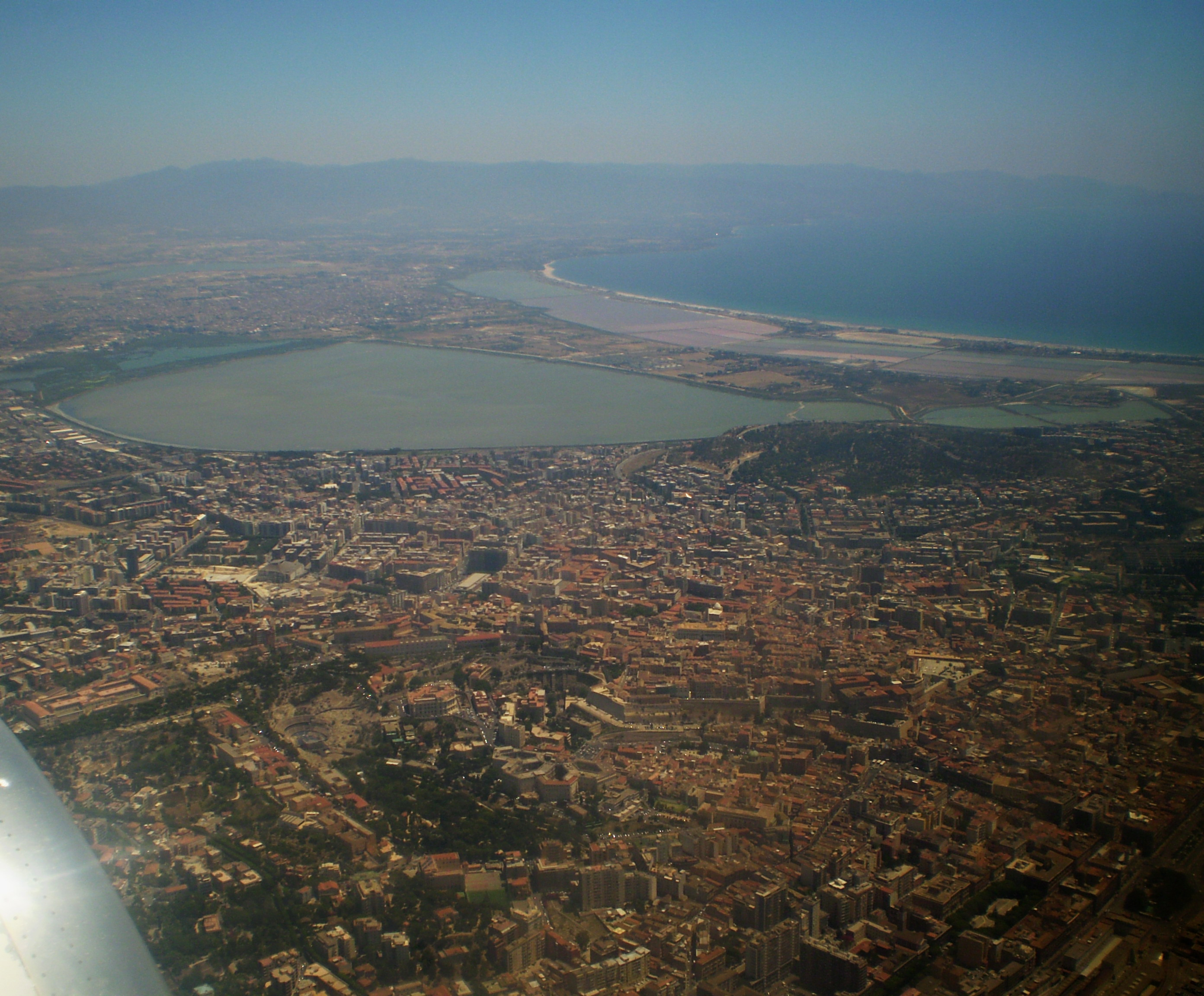
View of Cagliari

Cagliari is the capital of the region and the largest city on the island. It has ancient origins, as it was founded by the Phoenicians on previous Nuragic sites. Later occupation by Punics and the Romans left many archaeological finds, including the Tuvixeddu necropolis and the amphitheater, which could accommodate up to 10,000 people. Numerous coastal ponds surround the city, like the Molentargius - Saline Regional Park, located between the urban area and Poetto Beach. These wetlands are very important for the reproduction of water birds such as the greater flamingo.

In the Sarrabus-Gerrei area, the beaches of Costa Rei extend to the foot of the hills of Capo Ferrato; they are considered to be among the most beautiful in the world by Lonely Planet, along with those of Villasimius farther south. To the southwest of Cagliari, the main tourist resorts are located in the town of Pula, which also houses the ruins of the ancient city of Nora.

The Marmilla and Sarcidano regions have several important archaeological sites and landscapes such as the Giara di Gesturi. At Barumini is the site of Su Nuraxi, a UNESCO heritage site, one of the most visited historic sites on the island. In the commune territory of Orroli, there are the ruins of Nuraghe Arrubiu. These territories and nearby Trexenta are traversed by the Trenino Verde, a tourism railway line.

==== Sulcis, Iglesiente, Monreale ====
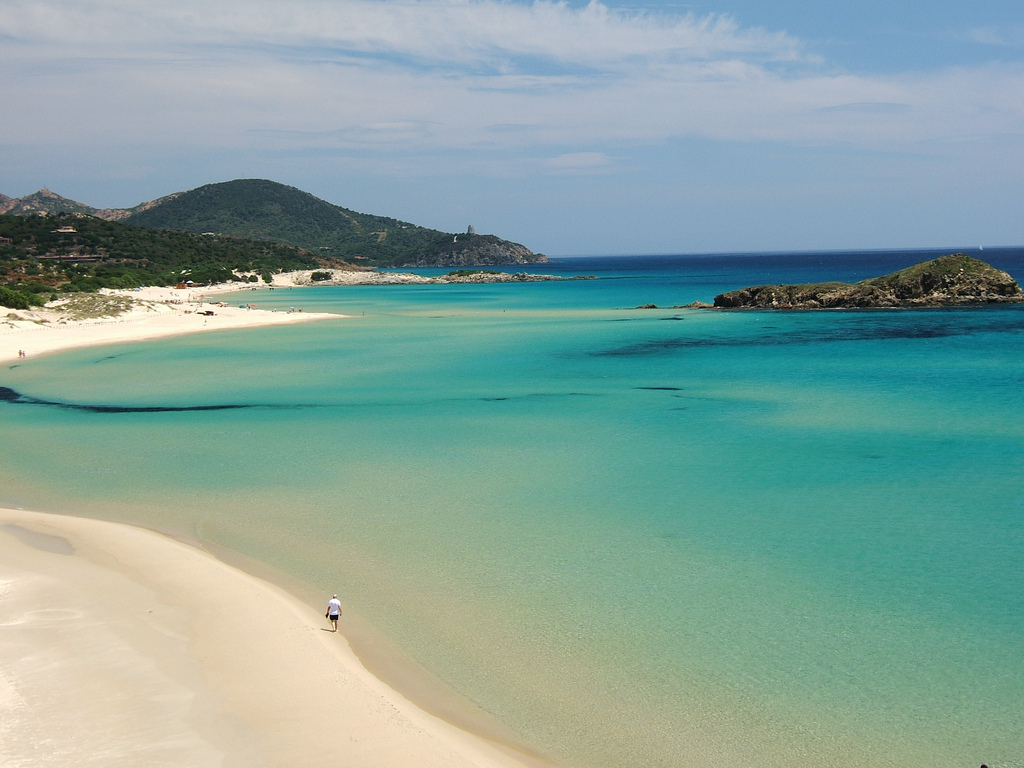
Chia

The southwest part of Sardinia is the Sulcis region and includes the islands of San Pietro and Sant'Antioco, which have the peculiarity of hosting Ligurian communities (including Carloforte and Calasetta). The Teulada cape limestone cliffs originated 500 million years ago and are considered to be among the oldest rocks in Europe. In the vicinity of Carbonia, there is the fortress of Monte Sirai, a testimony to the Phoenician-Punic and then Roman domination of the region, which also affected the islands and the littoral below, where the ruins of Sulci, Bithia, Inosim and Pani-Loriga are located, dating from the 8th century BC. The most popular seaside resorts are Porto Pino (Sant'Anna Arresi) and Chia(Domus de Maria).

The Iglesiente, named after the medieval town of Iglesias (founded by the infamous Count Ugolino della Gherardesca), has been an important mining district; abandoned mines are an example of mining architecture and industrial archeology. In the municipality of Fluminimaggiore is the temple of Antas, from Punic Roman times.

Another notable spot is the sand dunes of Piscinas (Arbus), in the Costa Verde, where golden sand dunes penetrate 3 kilometers into the interior, forming a miniature desert. The dunes are active and moved by the wind. Twisted junipers grow in the desert boundary areas, and the Mediterranean scrub is inhabited by animals that include the Sardinian deer.

=== Centre ===
==== Barbagia, Goceano, Baronie and Ogliastra ====
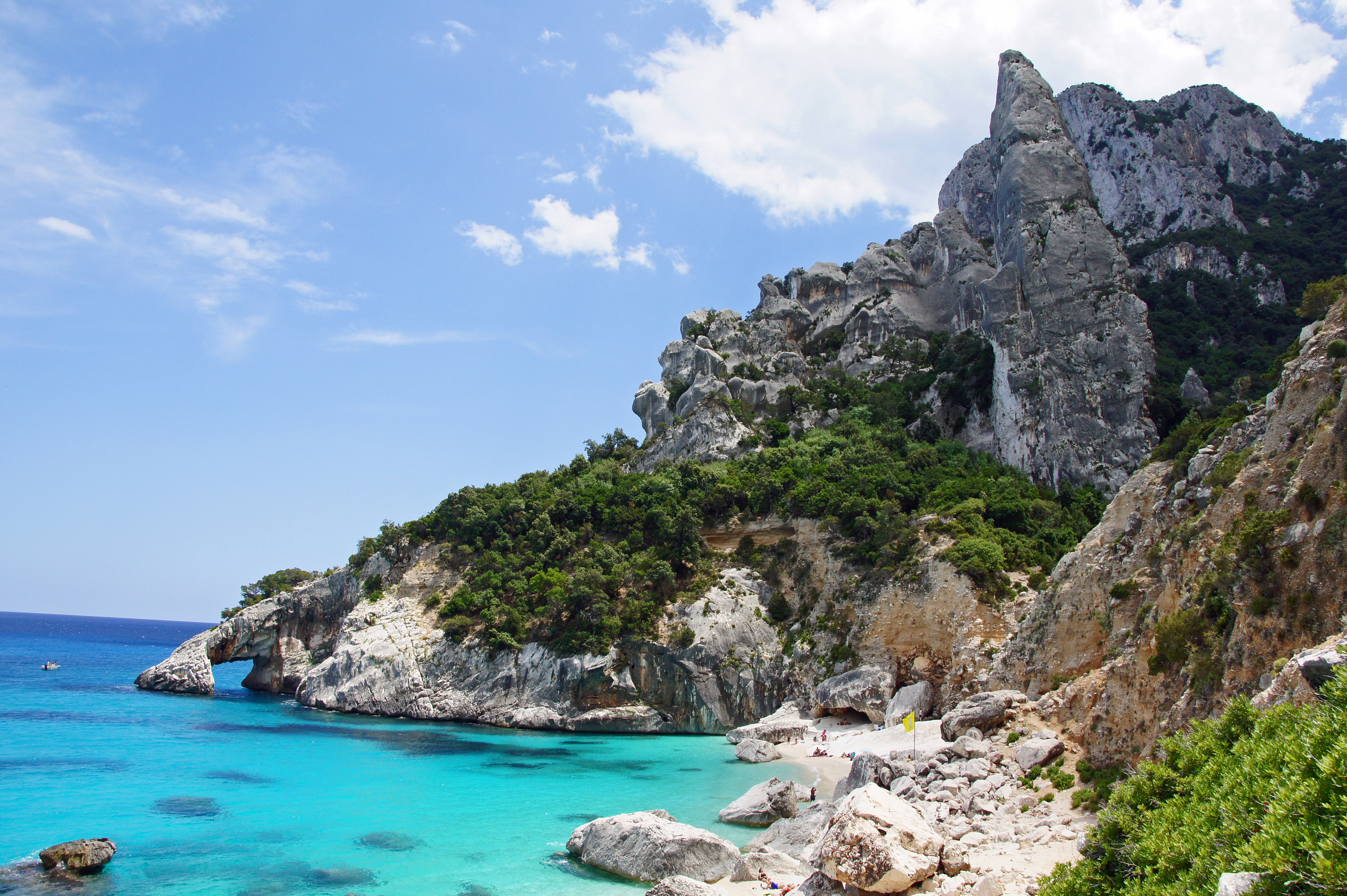
Cala Goloritzé

Barbagia is the region that represents the heart of Sardinia; it surrounds around the Gennargentu massif and Supramonte highland, a chain of granite, shale and limestone mountains that reaches the eastern coast from the inner parts of the island and descends to the sea between Dorgali and Baunei. The town of Nuoro is the main urban center, while Fonni is a winter sports center with a ski lift to Monte Spada and Bruncu Spina ski area.

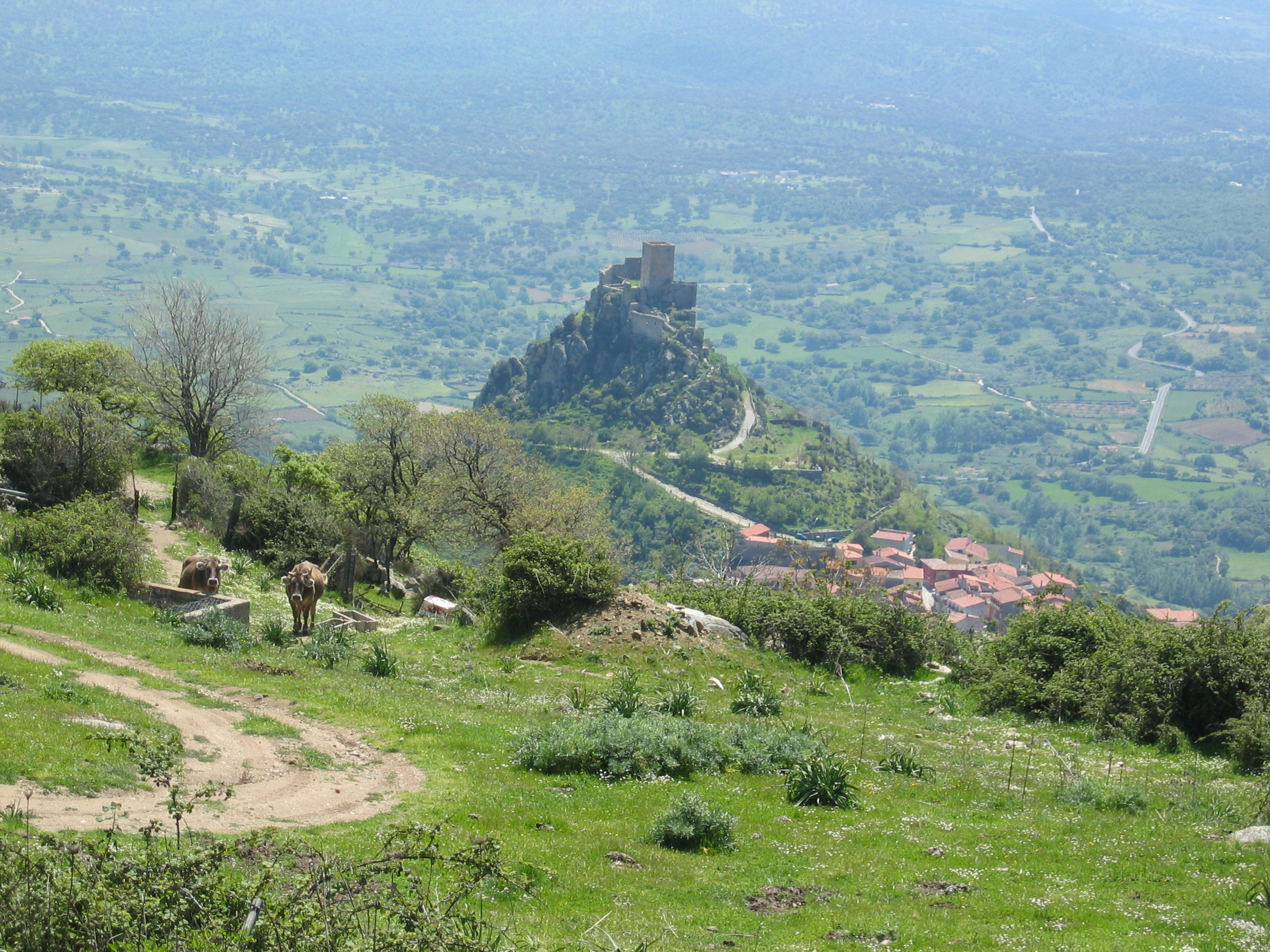
Castle of Burgos.

Goceano, inland mountainous territory, is instead known above all for the castle of Burgos, one of the many medieval castles in Sardinia. The main urban centres are Bono with Italy's most expansive yew tree forest Sos Nibberos, considered the traditional Goceano's chieftown, Anela, the oldest village of Goceano with in its vicinity Forest'Anela for trekking tourism and Domus de Janas Sos Furrighesos, Benetutti, Burgos, Bultei, Nule, Esporlatu, Illorai and Bottidda.

The main tourist attractions of the coastal region of the Baronie are Orosei, Posada and Siniscola. In Ogliastra, the main tourist locations include Arbatax-Tortolì, Santa Maria Navarrese, Lotzorai, Bari Sardo and Cardedu.

==== Sinis, Marghine, Montiferru, Planargia, Barigadu ====
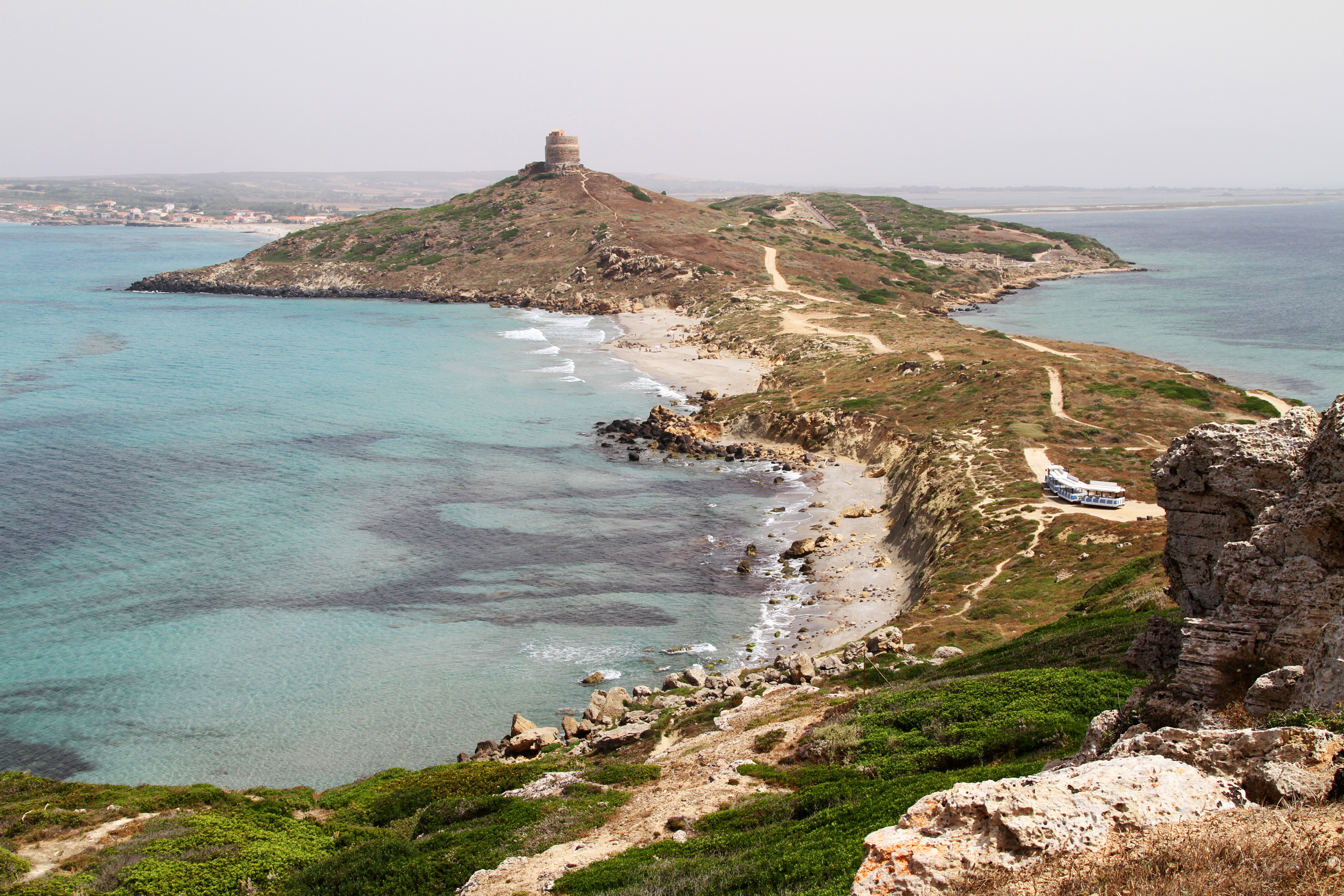
San Giovanni di Sinis

Tharros was founded by the Phoenicians, but on previous Nuragic villages; it was inhabited for 1,800 years before being abandoned. The port's ruins are impressive, but only a small part of its actual extent has been excavated. In the Sinis peninsula, where the Giants of Monte Prama were discovered, there are sandy beaches such as Is Arutas and Mari Ermi.

Oristano flourished between the years 1100 and 1400, during the period of the Giudicato of Arborea. Inside the ancient walls remain the Tower of San Cristoforo or of Marianus II of Arborea and the opposite, Portixedda. The cathedral and the churches of San Francesco and Santa Chiara are located in the historic center, near the Eleonora of Arborea square. Just outside Oristano, there is the pond of Cabras and the nearby lagoon of Mistras, where thousands of cormorants and flamingos, as well as ducks, coots, white herons, western swamphen and black-winged stilt live seasonally.

The main tourist resort of the Planargia is the town of Bosa with the Castle of Serravalle. The Marghine, which has Macomer as its main center, is one of the Sardinian territories with the highest concentration of Nuragic sites. In the Barigadu region, one of the most visited sites is the ruins of the Roman baths in the territory of Fordongianus (the former Forum Traiani).

=== North ===
==== Gallura ====
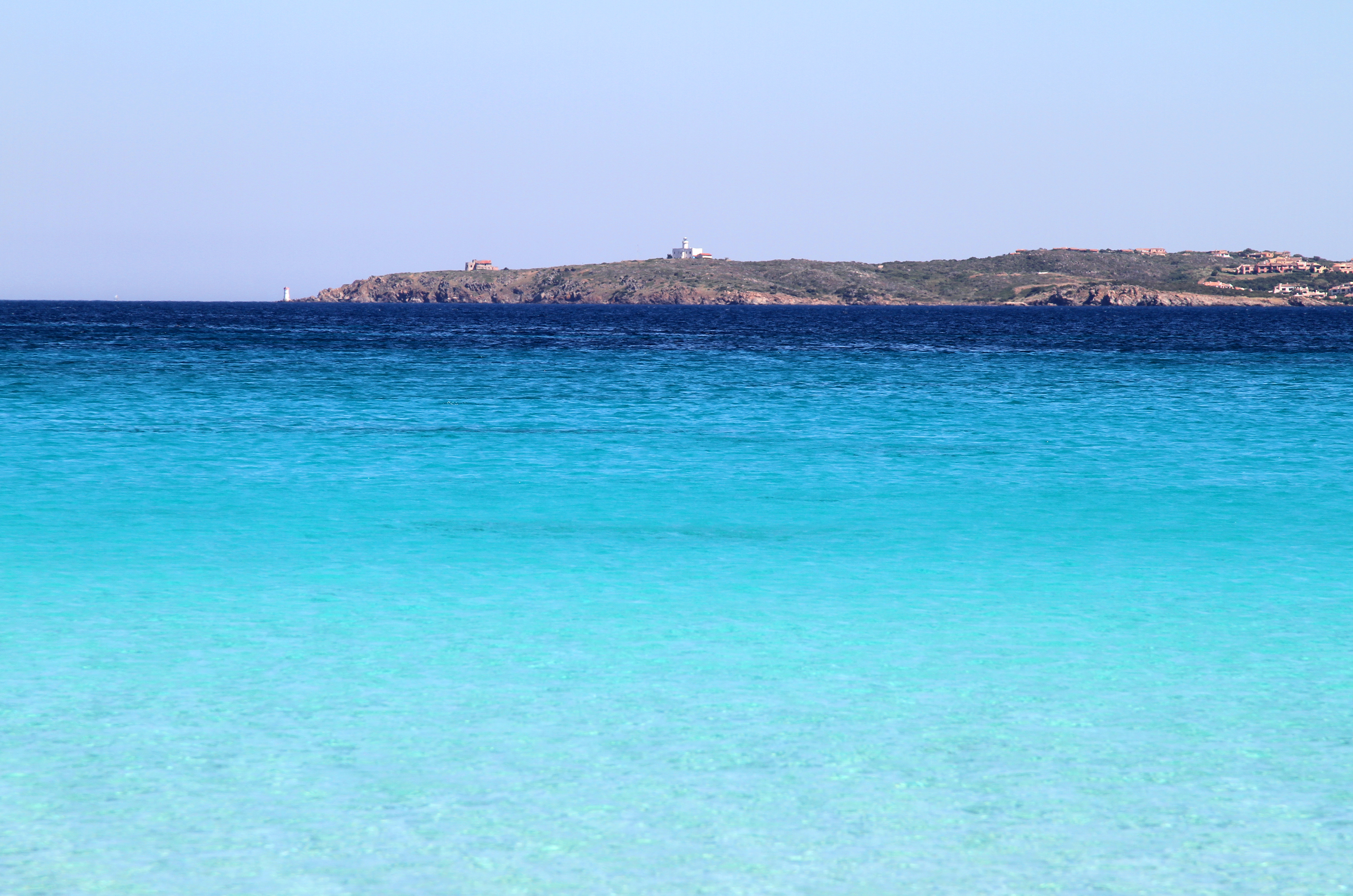
Caprera

Gallura is a territory that occupies the whole northeastern part of Sardinia, including the Maddalena archipelago and the island of Caprera, where Giuseppe Garibaldi spent his last years and where he is buried. It is a mountain region, with few flat areas (the Olbia plain) dominated by the polished granite shapes and the dark green of the Mediterranean scrub. Monti is a notable center, is known for its vineyards producing the local vermentino wine.

In the Costa Smeralda, and farther south in Budoni and San Teodoro, much of the island's tourism is concentrated, but there are also completely wild areas, such as the vast territories of Alà dei Sardi and Buddusò, easily reachable from the coast. All coastal communes are renowned tourist resorts, while the communes of the interior are rich in precious remnants of the Nuragic civilization, dolmen, menhirs and sacred wells, as well as characteristic mountain villages (such as Aggius) and natural features, including the ancient olive trees of Santu Baltolu in Luras.

==== Algherese, Riviera del Corallo, Porto Torres, Golfo dell'Asinara, Romangia, Logudoro, Anglona, Meilogu ====
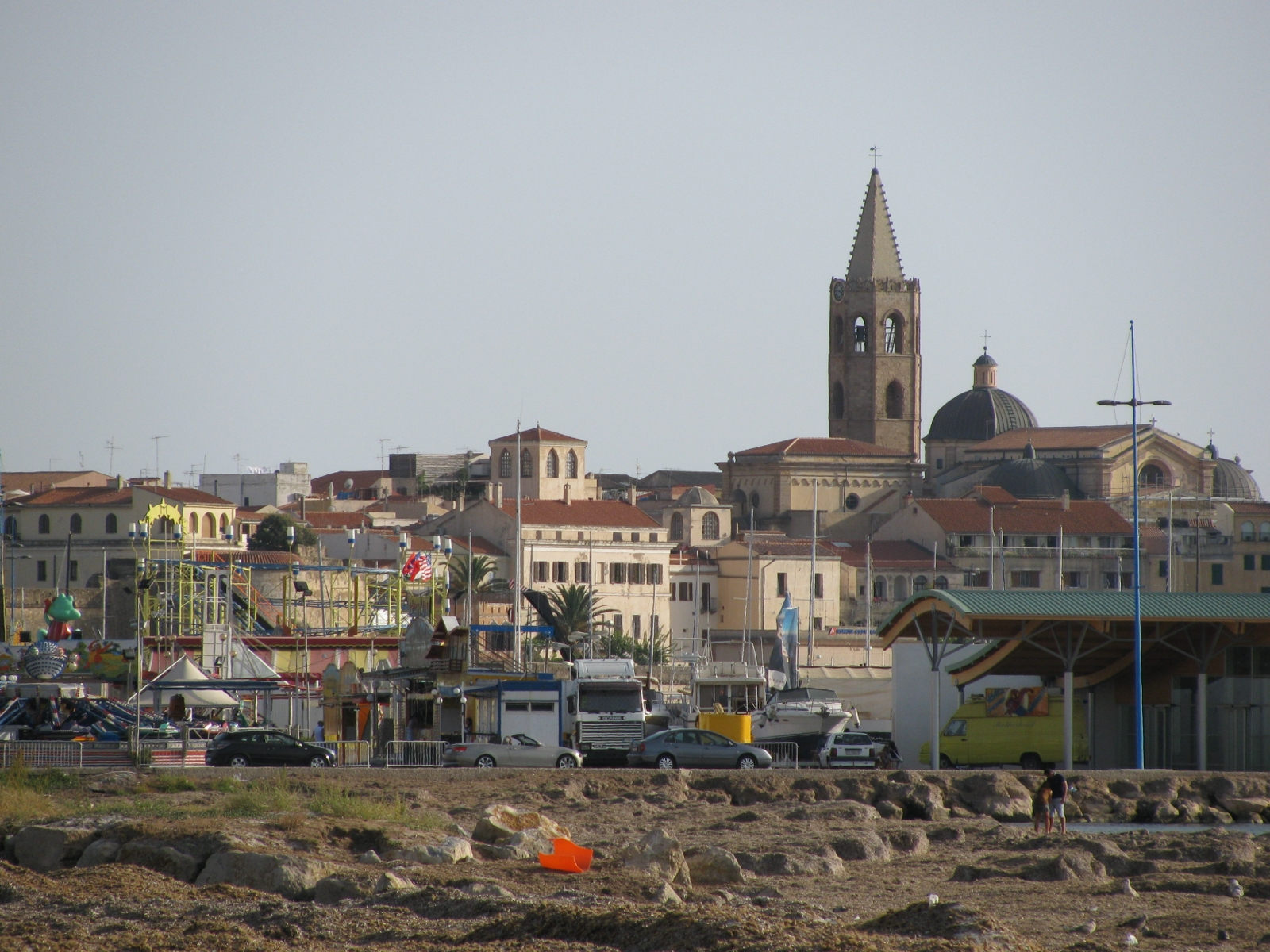
View of Alghero

Alghero and the Riviera del Corallo, Porto Torres, Asinara, Argentiera and Stintino are well known locations. Alghero, a tourist-oriented city and Catalan linguistic island, has numerous beaches and a vast and varied naturalistic heritage with a historic center that can be considered a museum in itself. The surrounding area is also rich in monuments and museums recording its history. The Alghero territory is also known as the Riviera del Corallo and the Neptune's grotto. The coasts around Capo Caccia and its submerged caves are another well known site.

Farther north are the ghost town of Argentiera and the port city of Porto Torres, with the island of Asinara and its national park, the important Roman vestiges of the ancient city of Turris Libisonis, countless archaeological sites located throughout its territory, as well as the majestic Basilica of San Gavino, former cathedral of the Roman Catholic Archdiocese of Sassari and one of the first manifestations of Romanesque architecture in Sardinia. A nearby beach is Balai, and Stintino has famous beaches such as La Pelosa. Castelsardo has a medieval castle, a medieval village and the picturesque beaches of Lu Bagnu. This area includes many other places of interest such as Sassari, Sardinia's second city by population, with its historic center, archaeological sites (such as the megalithic altar of Monte d'Accoddi), Platamona, Sedini, Tergu and Valledoria.

In the Logudoro hinterland, in addition to the Pre-Nuragic and Nuragic vestiges (including the Dolmen of Sa Coveccada and the nuraghe Santu Antine) there are numerous Romanesque churches, such as the basilica of Saccargia of Codrongianos, built in the 11th or 12th century in Romanesque-Pisan style by the judges of Torres, the basilica of Sant'Antioco di Bisarcio in Ozieri and the church of Santa Maria del Regno of Ardara.

=== The most beautiful villages in Italy ===
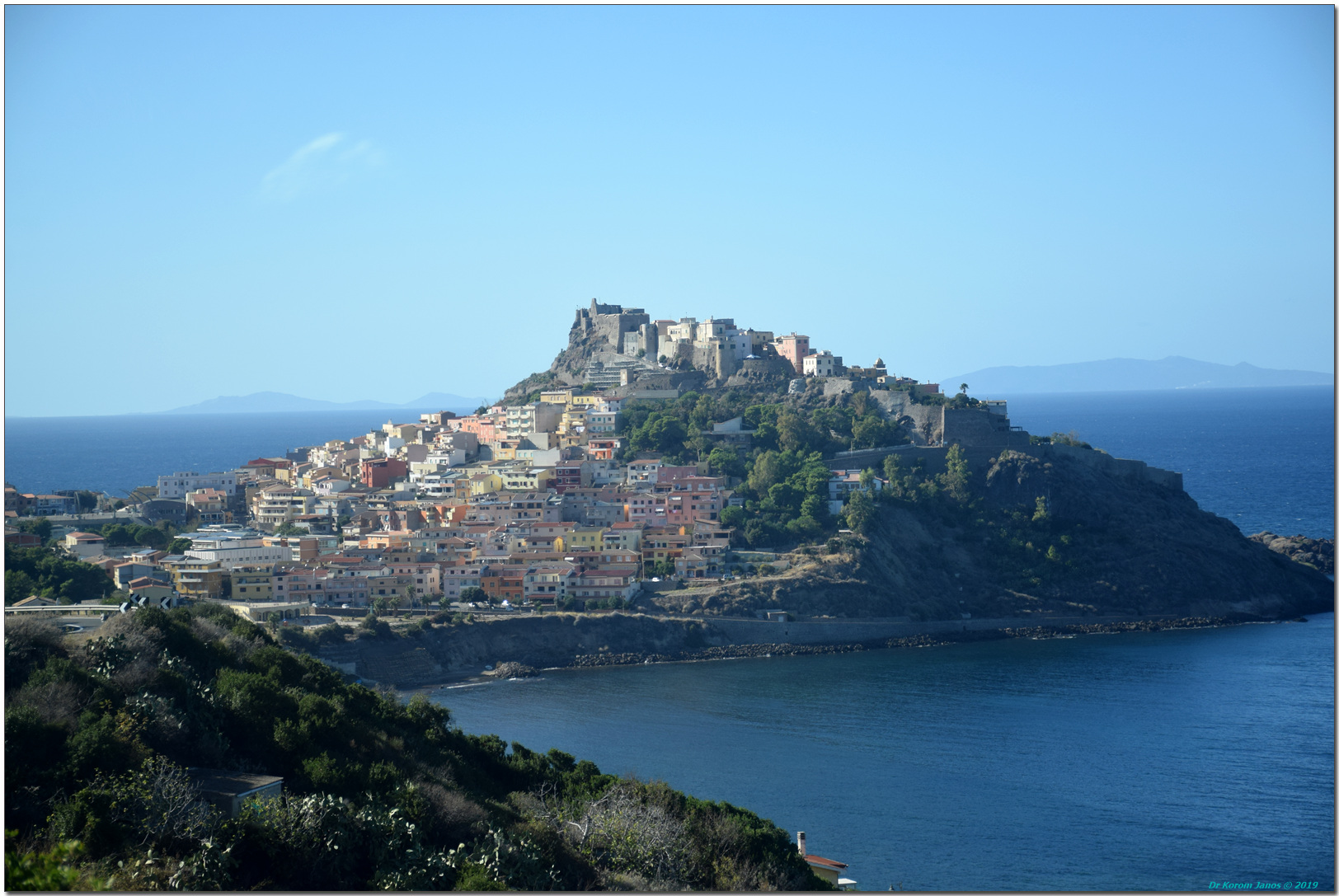
Castelsardo

In the classification of the cultural community of The most beautiful villages in Italy, Sardinia appears with 9 certified villages among the best in the country for conservation of the territory and artistic heritage, in addition to adequate cultural enhancement.

- Atzara
- Bosa
- Carloforte
- Castelsardo
- La Maddalena
- Lollove
- Posada
- Sadali
- Tempio Pausania

=== Unesco sites ===
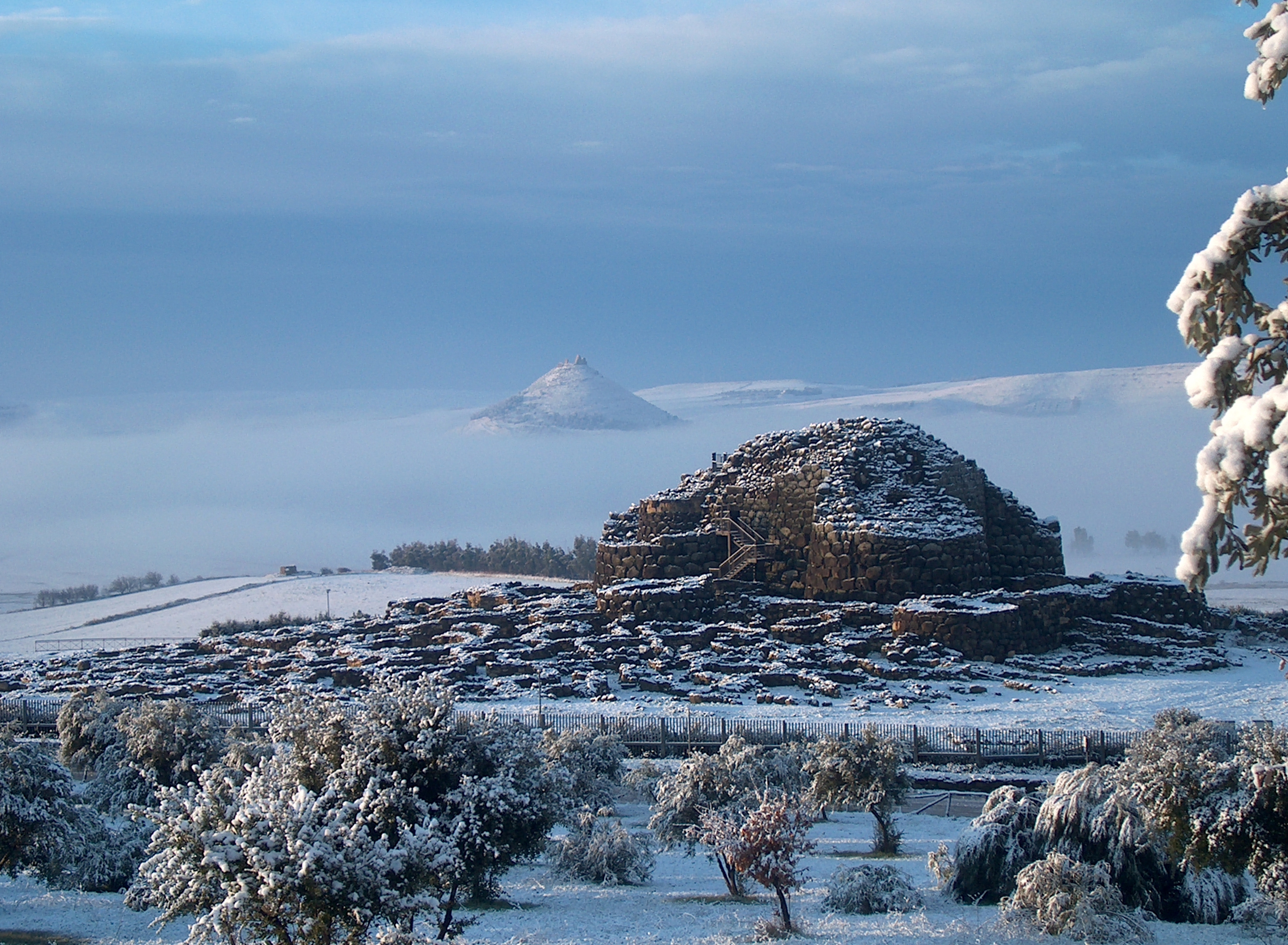
Su Nuraxi in winter

Su Nuraxi is a nuragic archaeological site in Barumini. Su Nuraxi simply means "The Nuraghe" in Campidanese, the southern variant of the Sardinian language.

Su Nuraxi is a settlement consisting of a seventeenth century BC Nuraghe, a bastion of four corner towers plus a central one, and a village inhabited from the thirteenth to the sixth century BC, developed around the Nuraghe. They are considered by scholars the most impressive expression of the Nuragic civilization and were included in the UNESCO list of World Heritage Sites in 1997 as Su Nuraxi di Barumini.

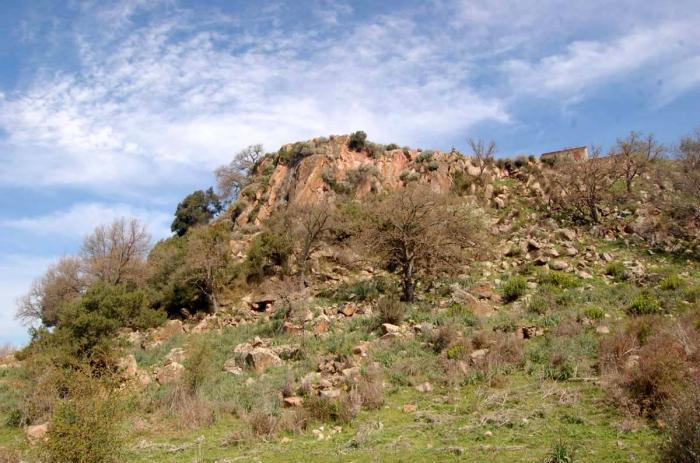
Domus de Janas Sos Furrighesos, Anela

Domus de Janas (Sardinian for 'House of the Fairies' or, alternatively, 'House of Witches') are a type of pre-Nuragic rock-cut chamber tomb found in Sardinia. They consist of several chambers quarried out by the people of the San Ciriaco through Ozieri cultures and subsequent cultures, resembling houses in their layout.

In 2021, the Domus de Janas were nominated for the World Heritage List. In July 2025, they were inscribed as a UNESCO World Heritage Site under the listing "Funerary Tradition in the Prehistory of Sardinia – The domus de janas".

== Mountain and ecotourism tourism ==
Sardinia has three national parks and several regional parks, nature reserves and minor oases. The territory represents an important resource for Sardinia. With the framework law n. 31 of 7 June 1989 the purposes and methods for establishing and managing the natural areas to be protected were defined, identifying 8 regional parks, 60 protected areas, 24 natural monuments and 16 areas of relevant naturalistic interest. To these areas are added the oases (protected area)|WWF oases, an organization that has been actively present on the island for some time.

== Trenino verde ==
The Trenino Verde (Little Green Train), a tourist rail service that travels on a 438 km network of lines used exclusively for tourism, has been operating for years. The routes covered are as follows:

- Mandas - Arbatax (159 km)
- Isili - Sorgono (83 km)
- Macomer - Bosa (46 km)
- Sassari - Tempio - Palau (150 km)

The lines are available year-round upon reservation, renting a train and customizing your itinerary. In the summer, these routes also operate a regular service according to a specific timetable and schedule.

== Food and wine tourism ==
The Sardinian cuisine is characterized by its variety, as well as by having been enriched in history through contributions and contaminations from contacts and exchanges between different European and Mediterranean cultures. Varied and diversified, it ranges from roasted meats to bread, cheeses, wines, to sea and land dishes, both of peasant and pastoral origin, game, fishing and the collection of wild herbs. It is considered part of the Mediterranean diet, a nutritional model proclaimed in 2010 by UNESCO among the oral and intangible heritages of humanity.

== Gallery ==
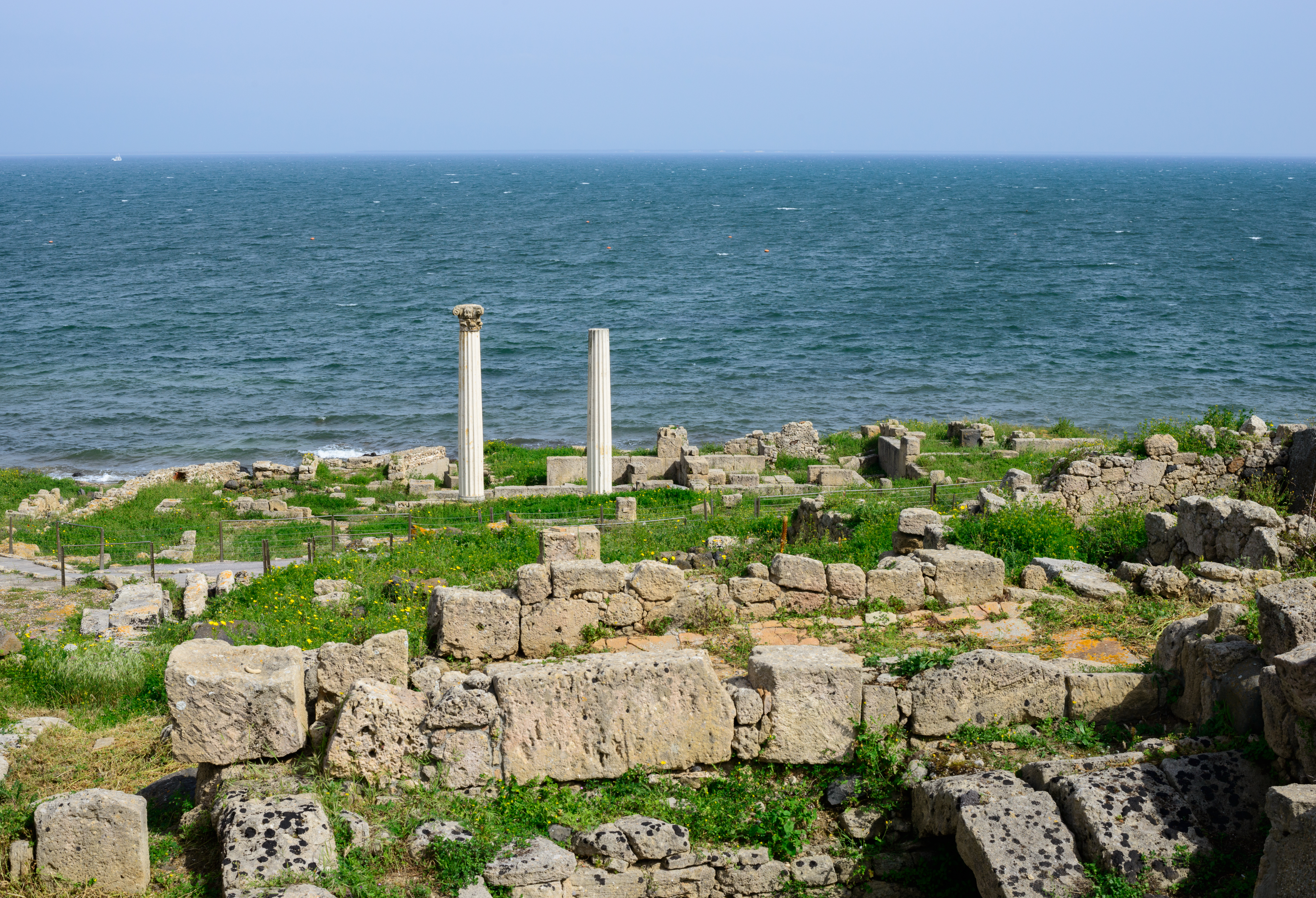
Tharros

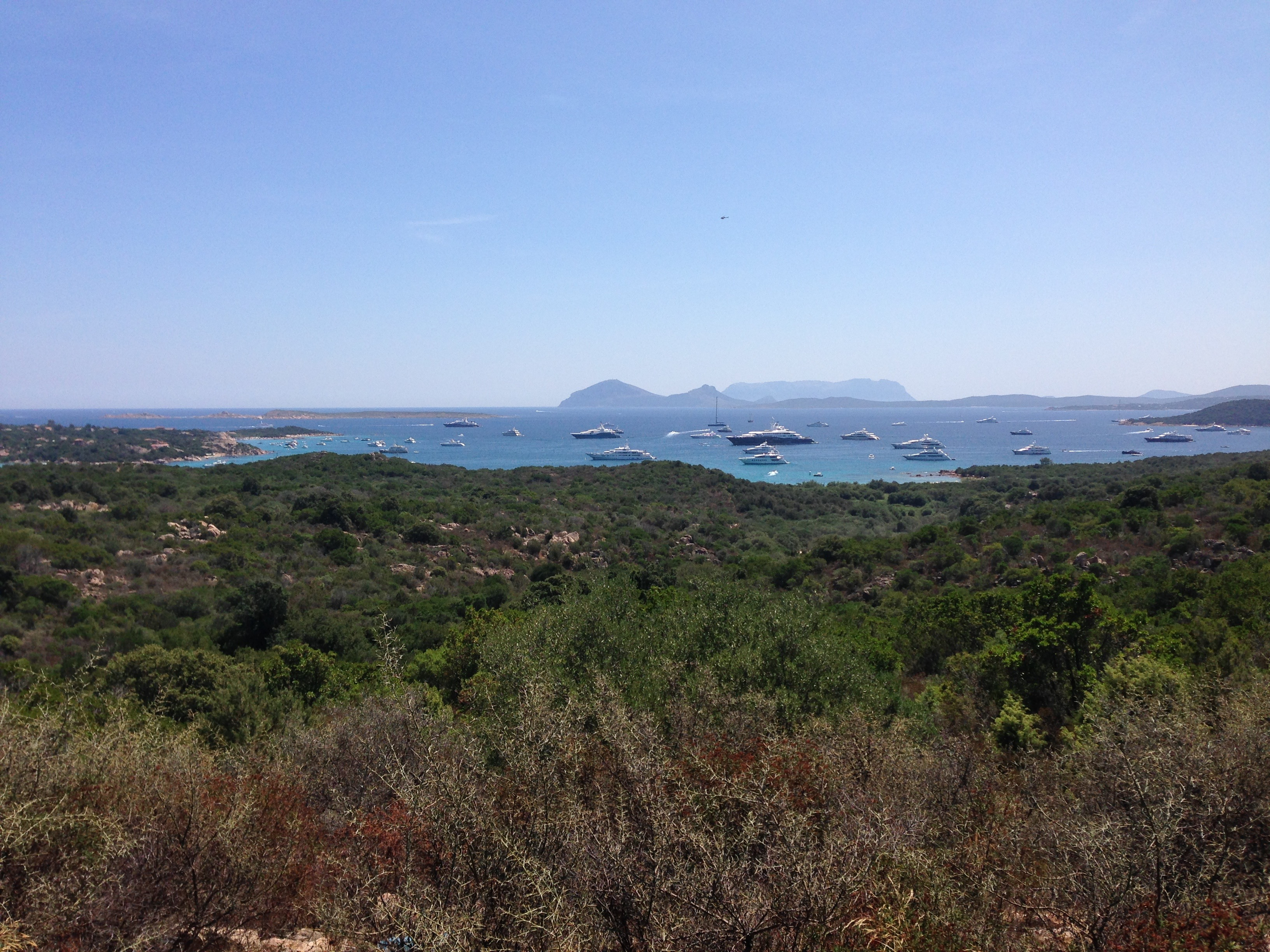
Costa smeralda

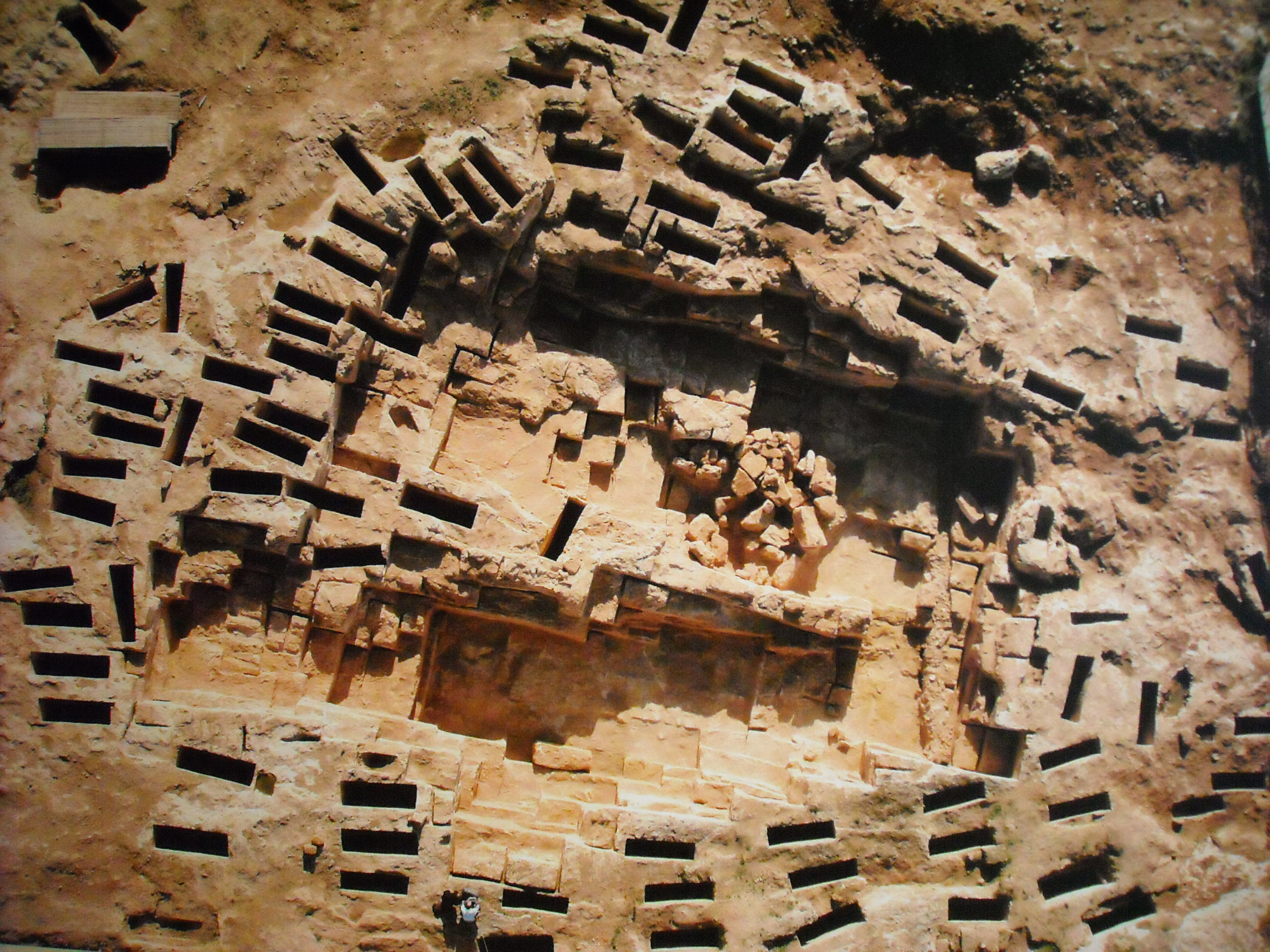
Tuvixeddu Necropolis

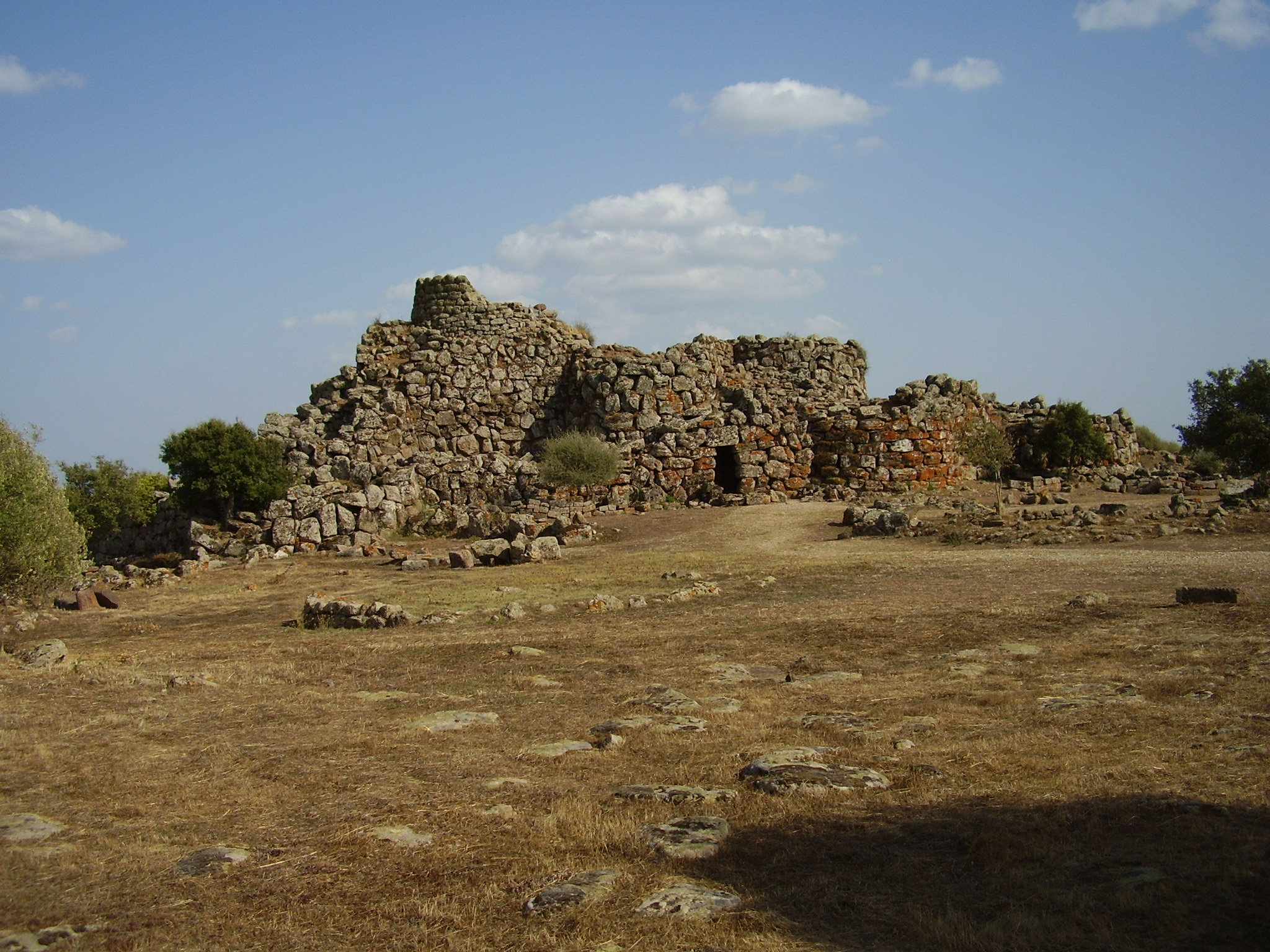
Nuraghe Arrubiu

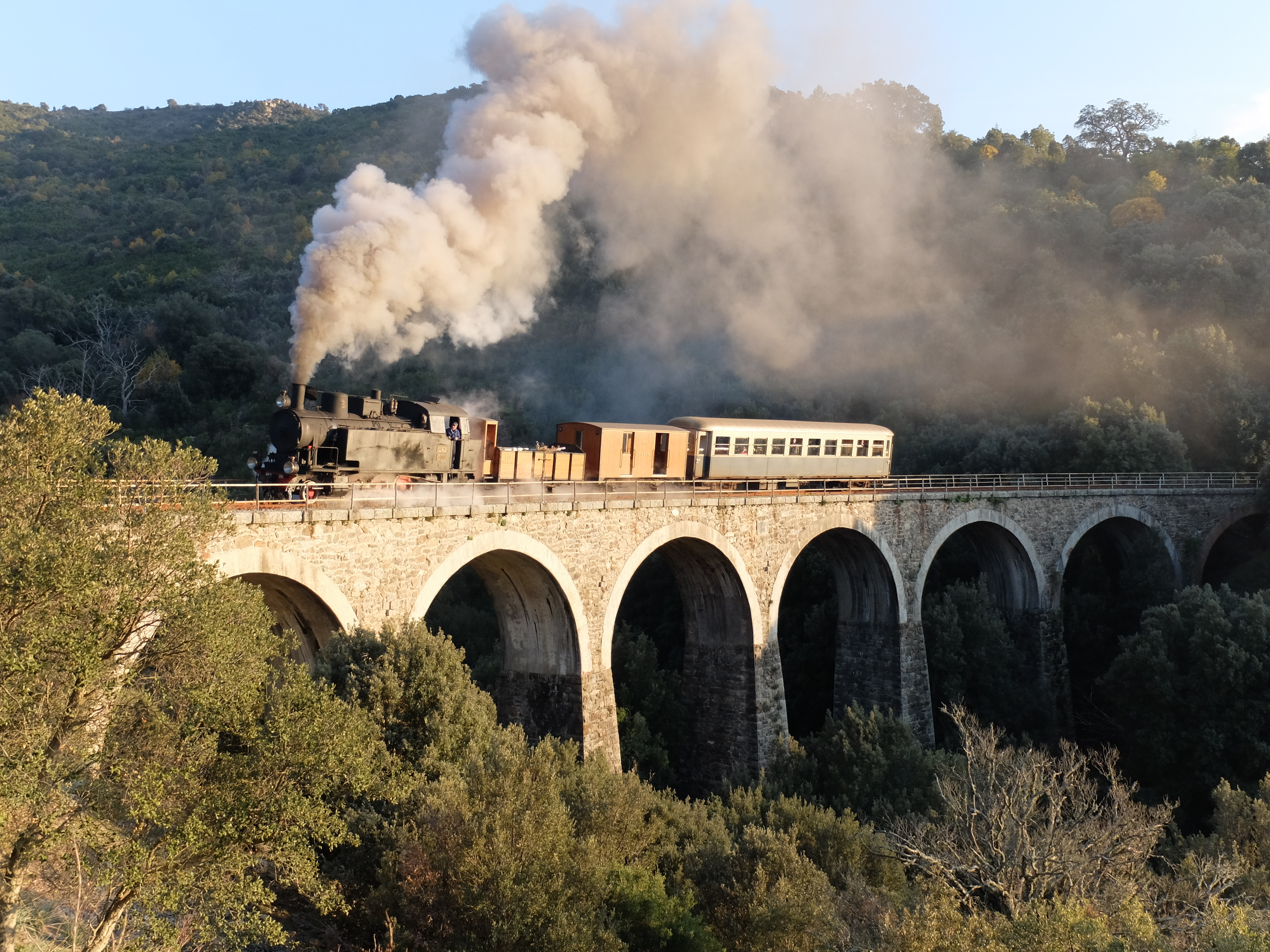
Trenino verde

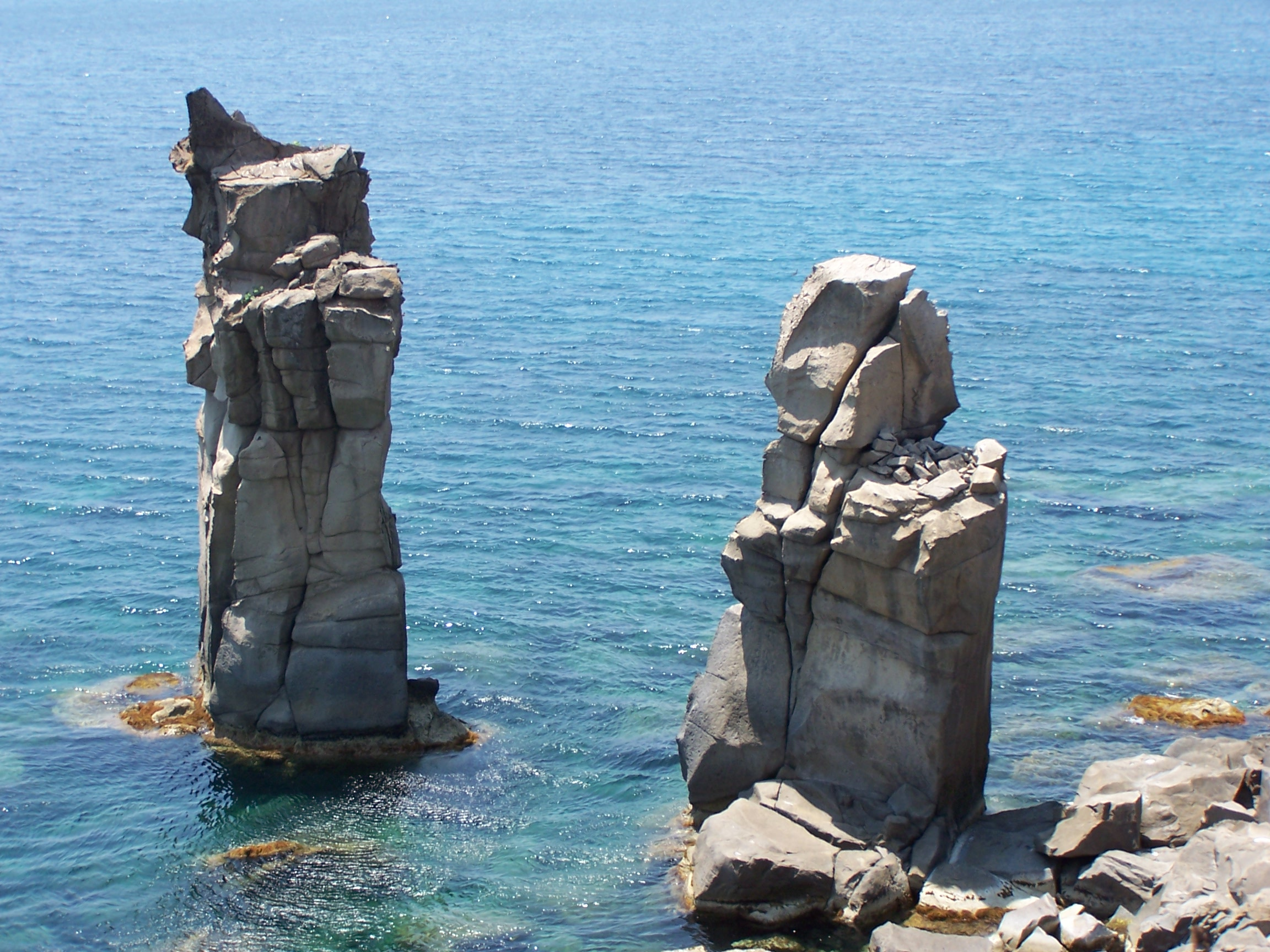
Carloforte, San Pietro Island

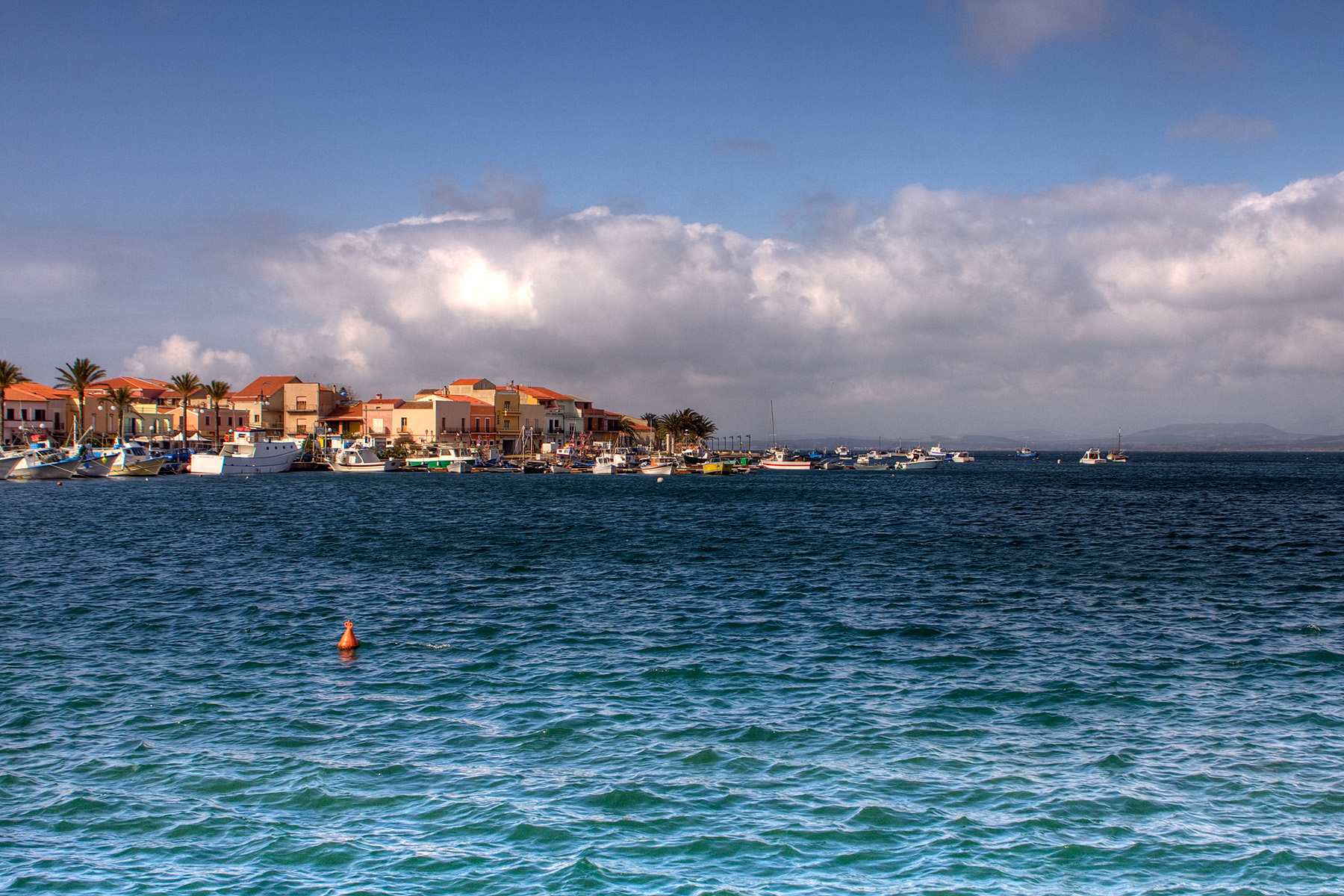
Sant'Antioco Island

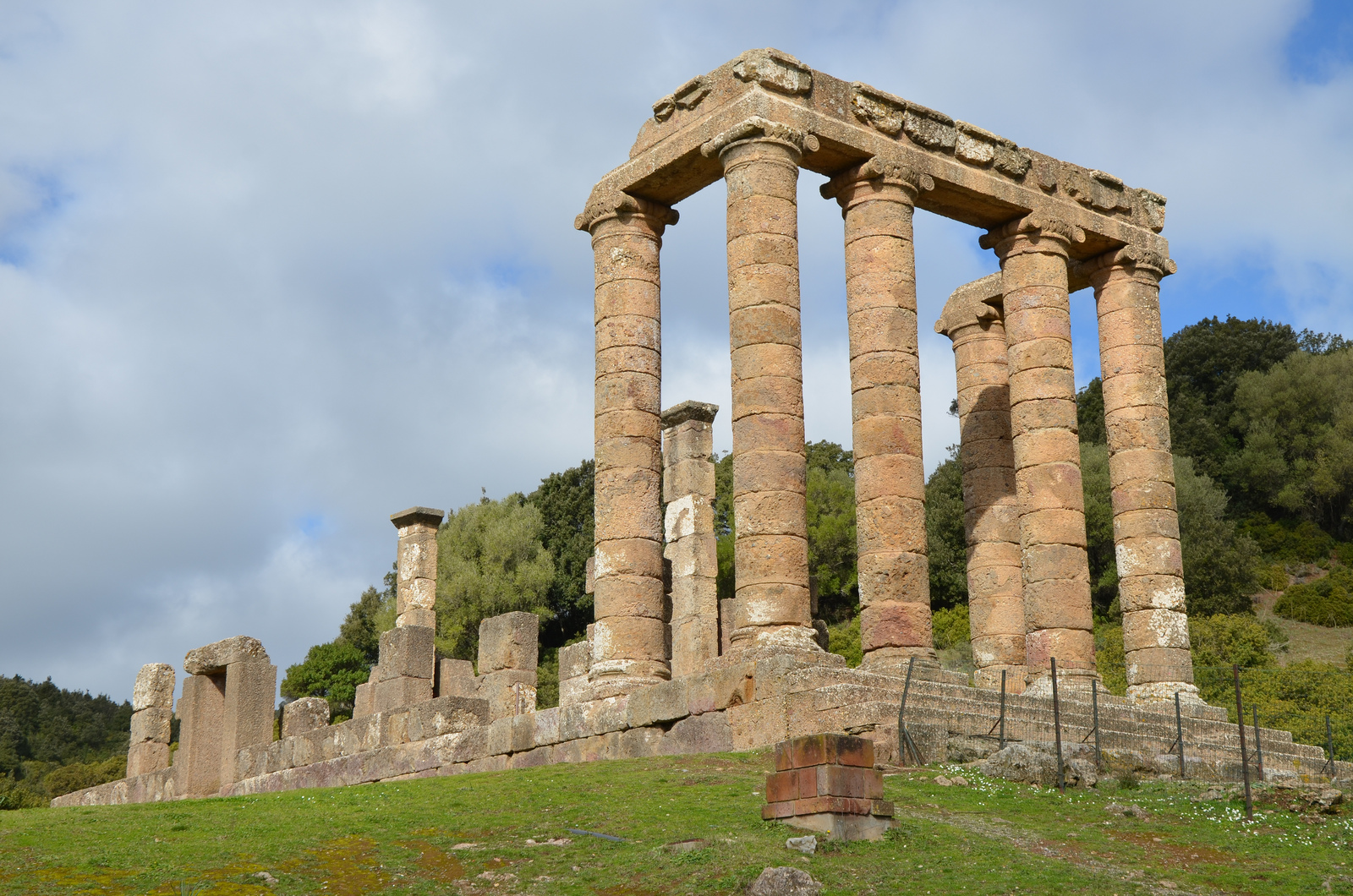
Temple of Antas

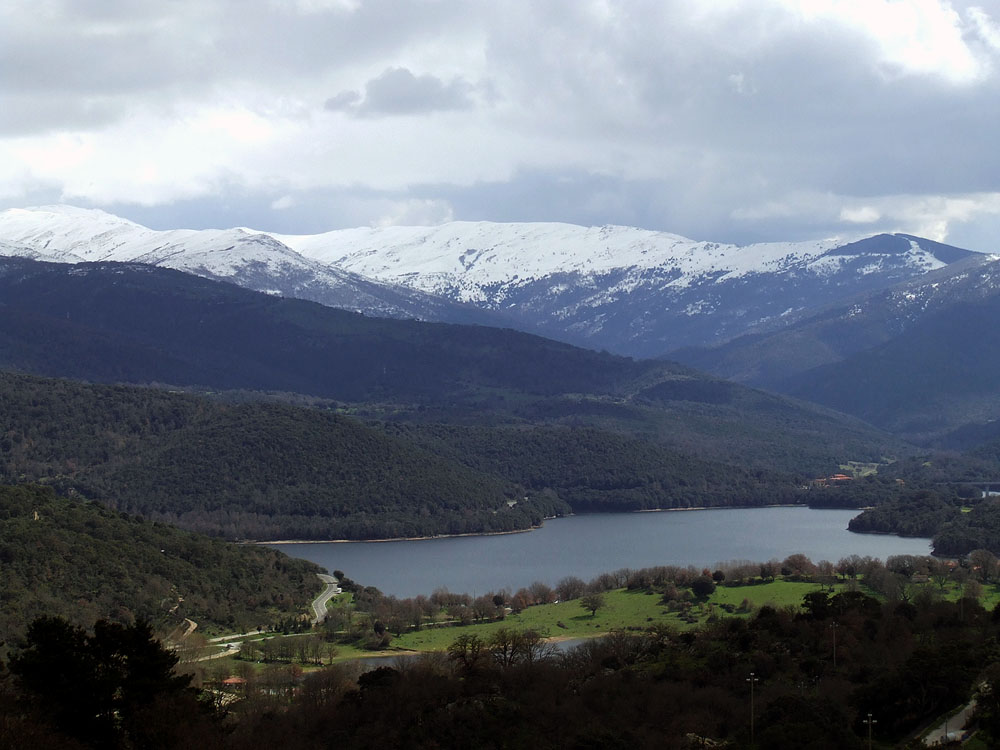
Gennargentu

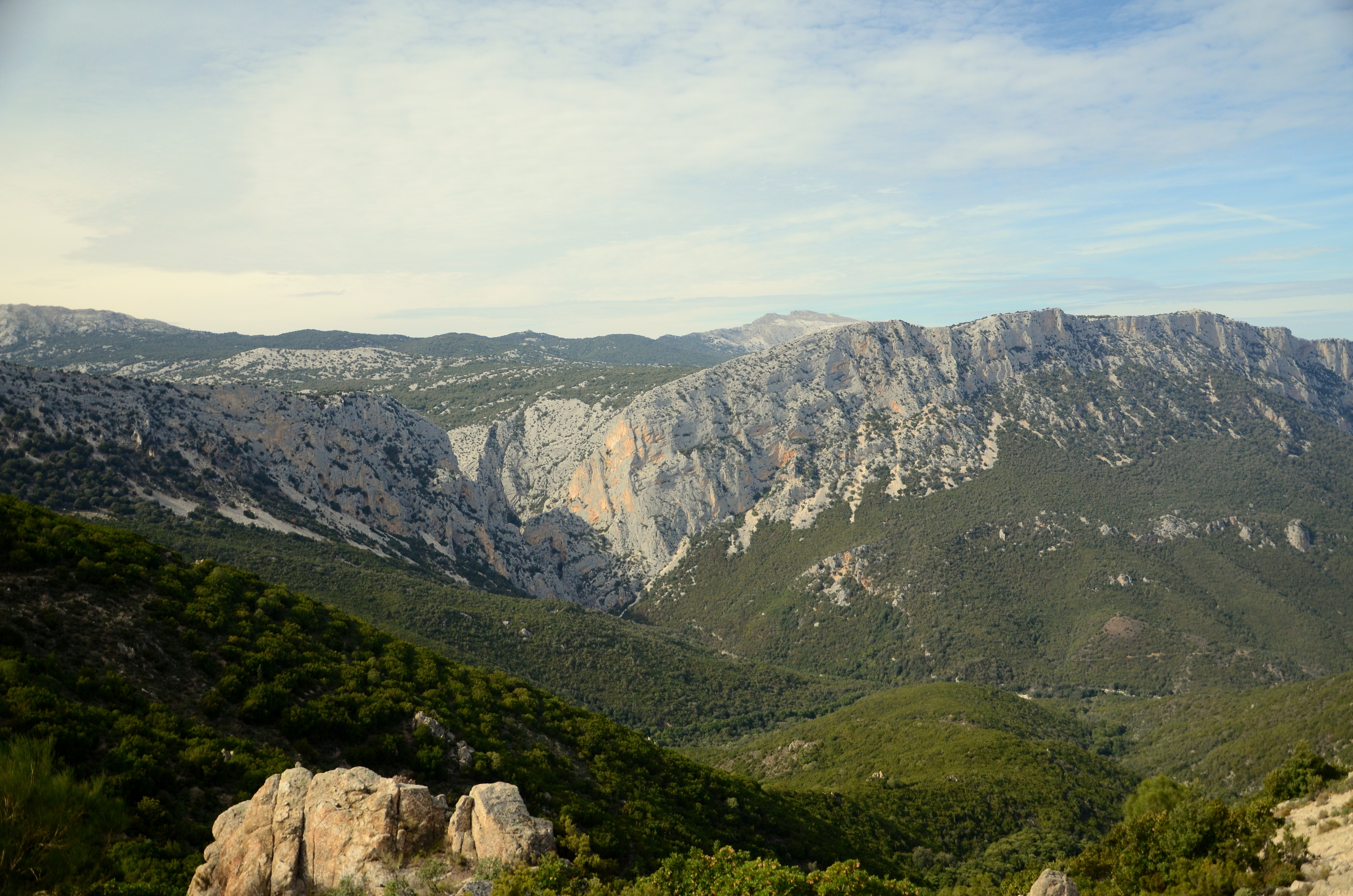
Gorroppu Canyon

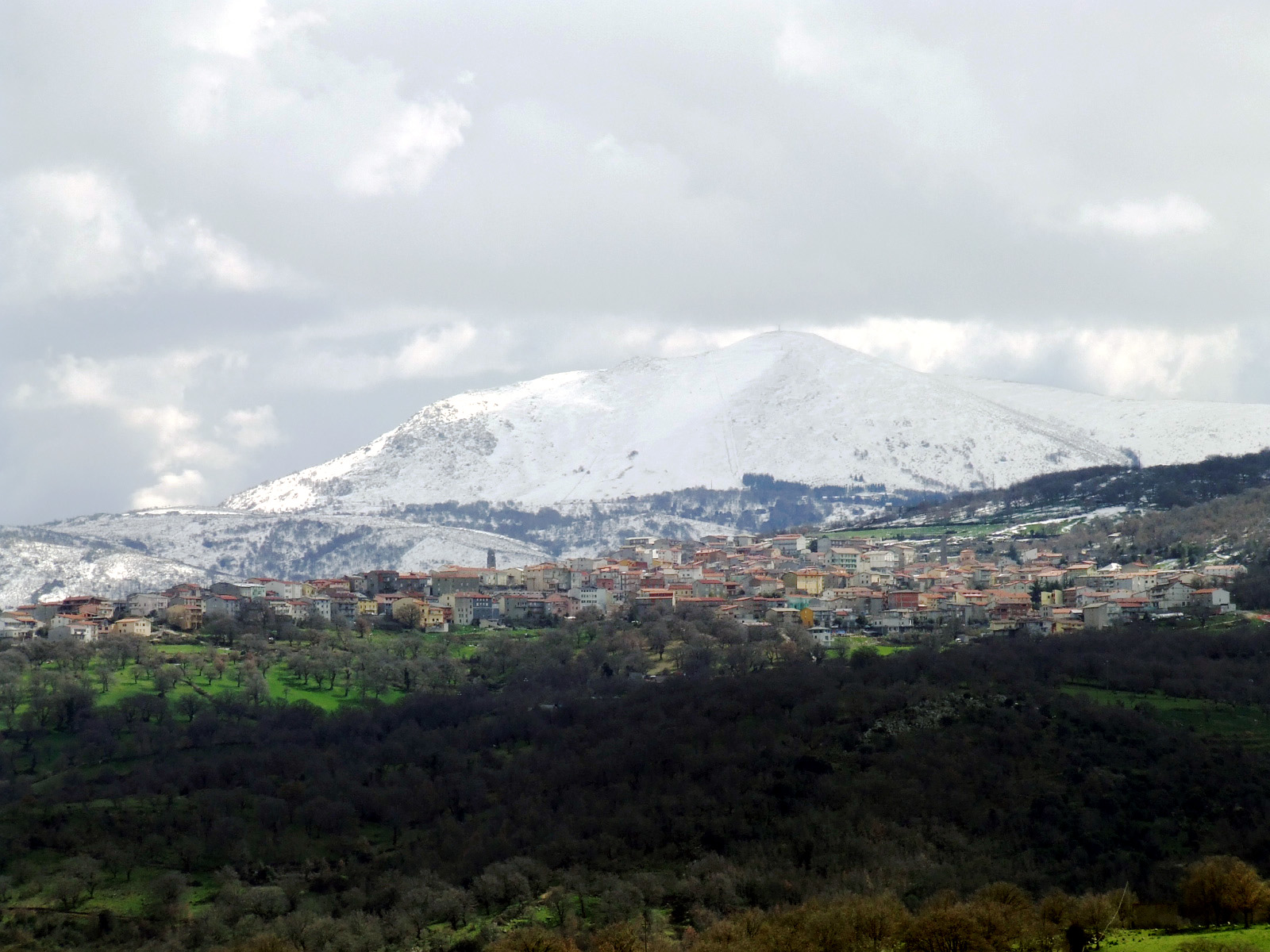
Fonni and the Monte Spada in the background

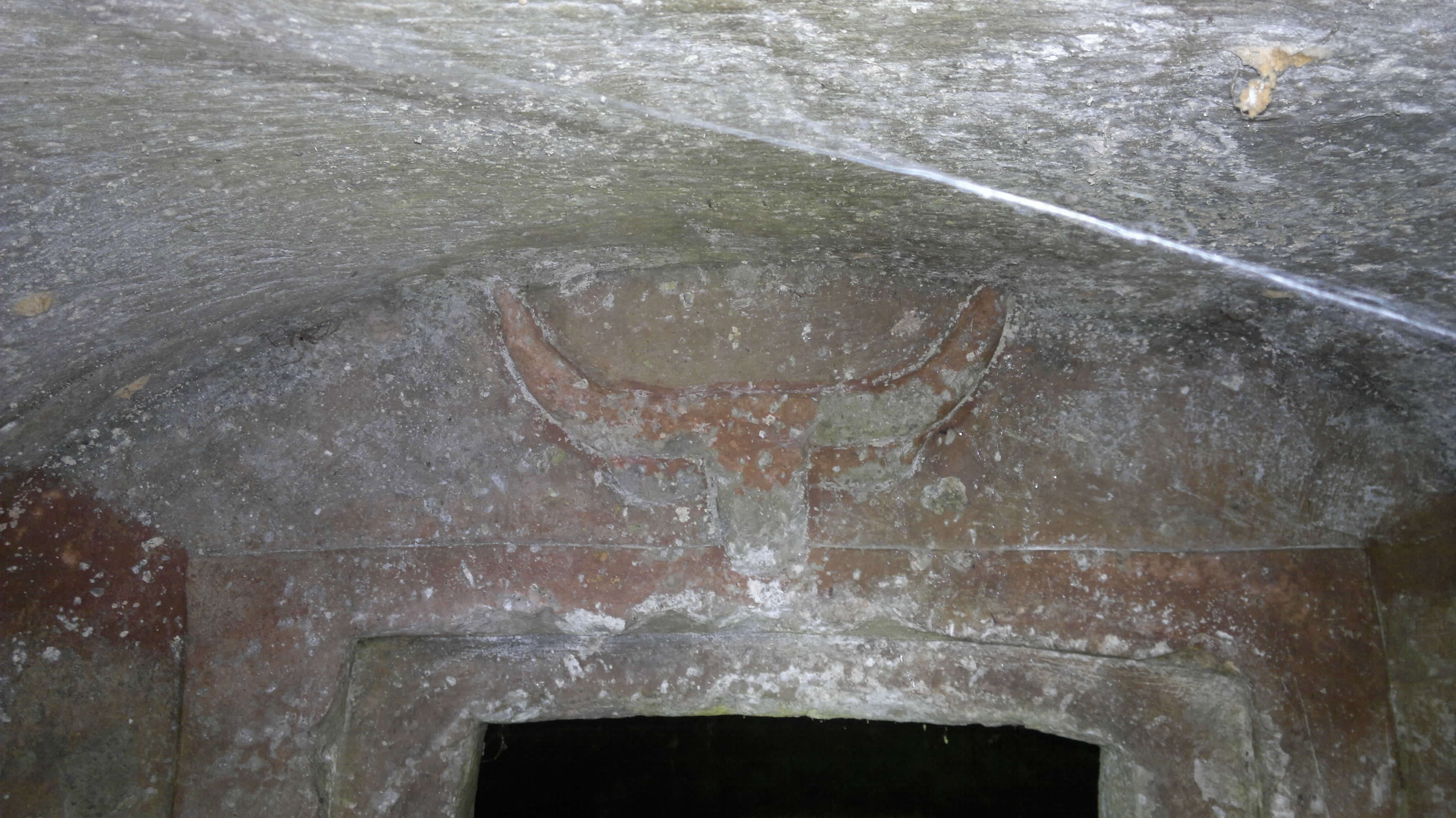
Domus de Janas Sos Furrighesos, Anela

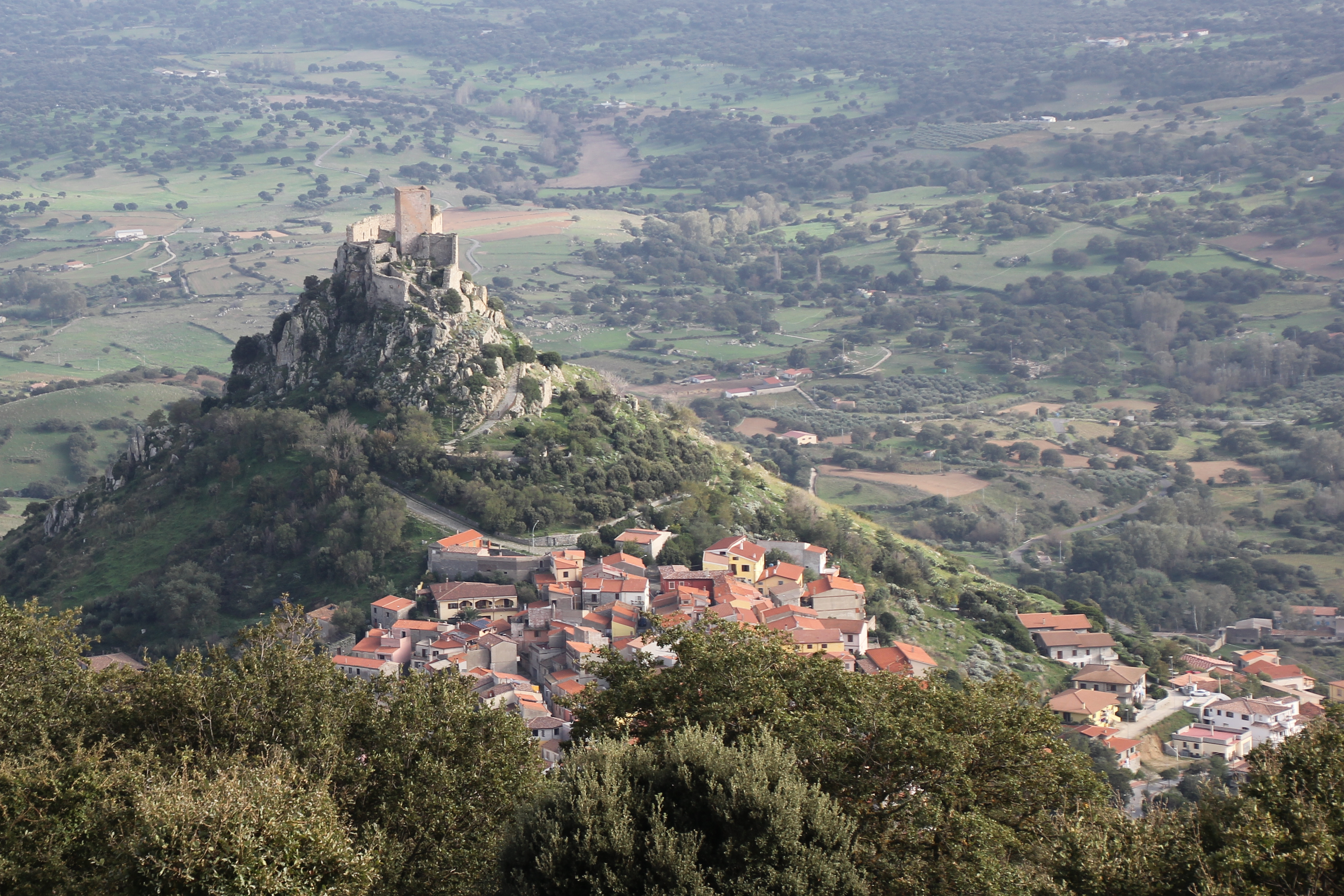
Burgos castle

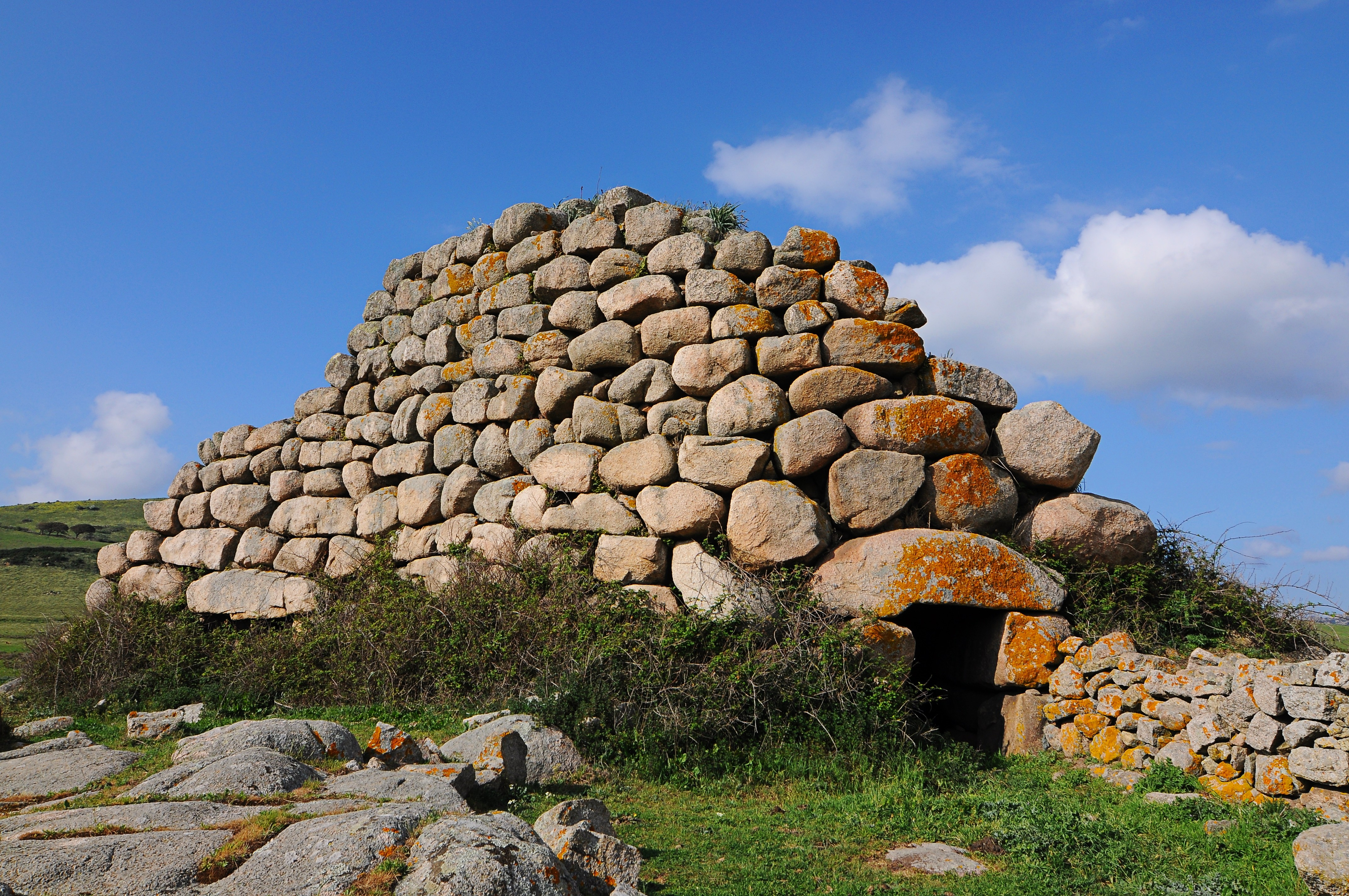
Nuraghe Izzana

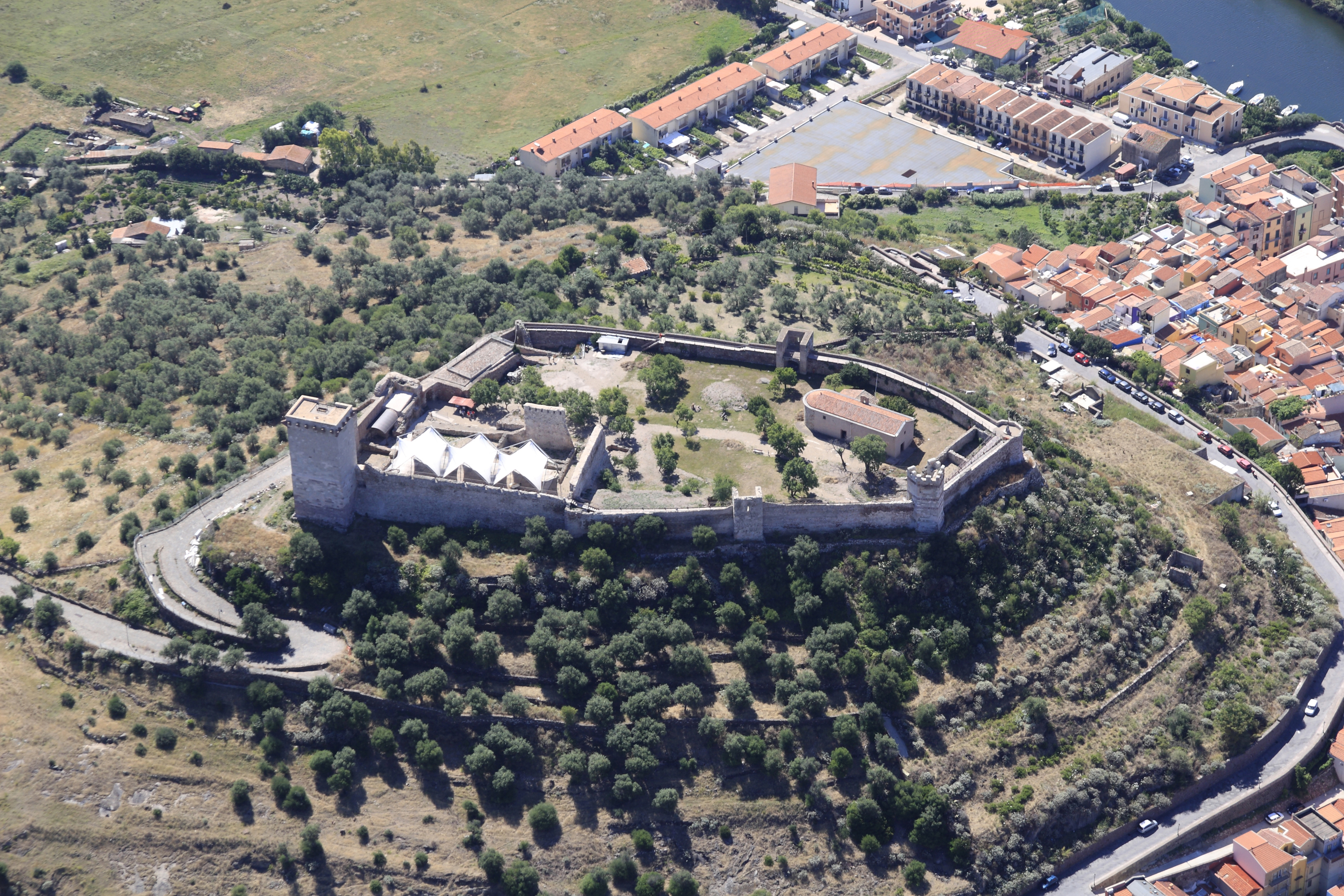
Bosa castle

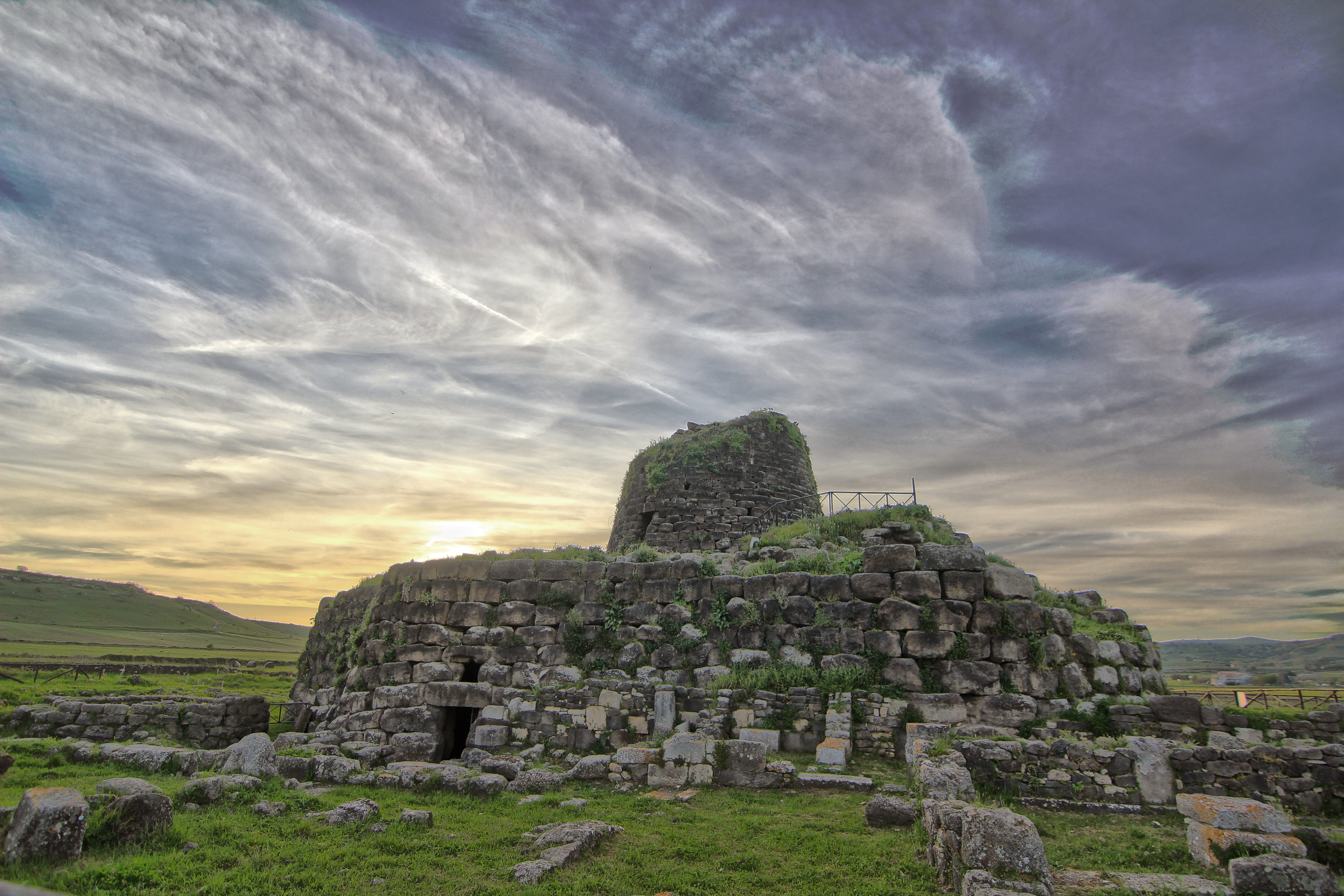
Nuraghe Santu Antine

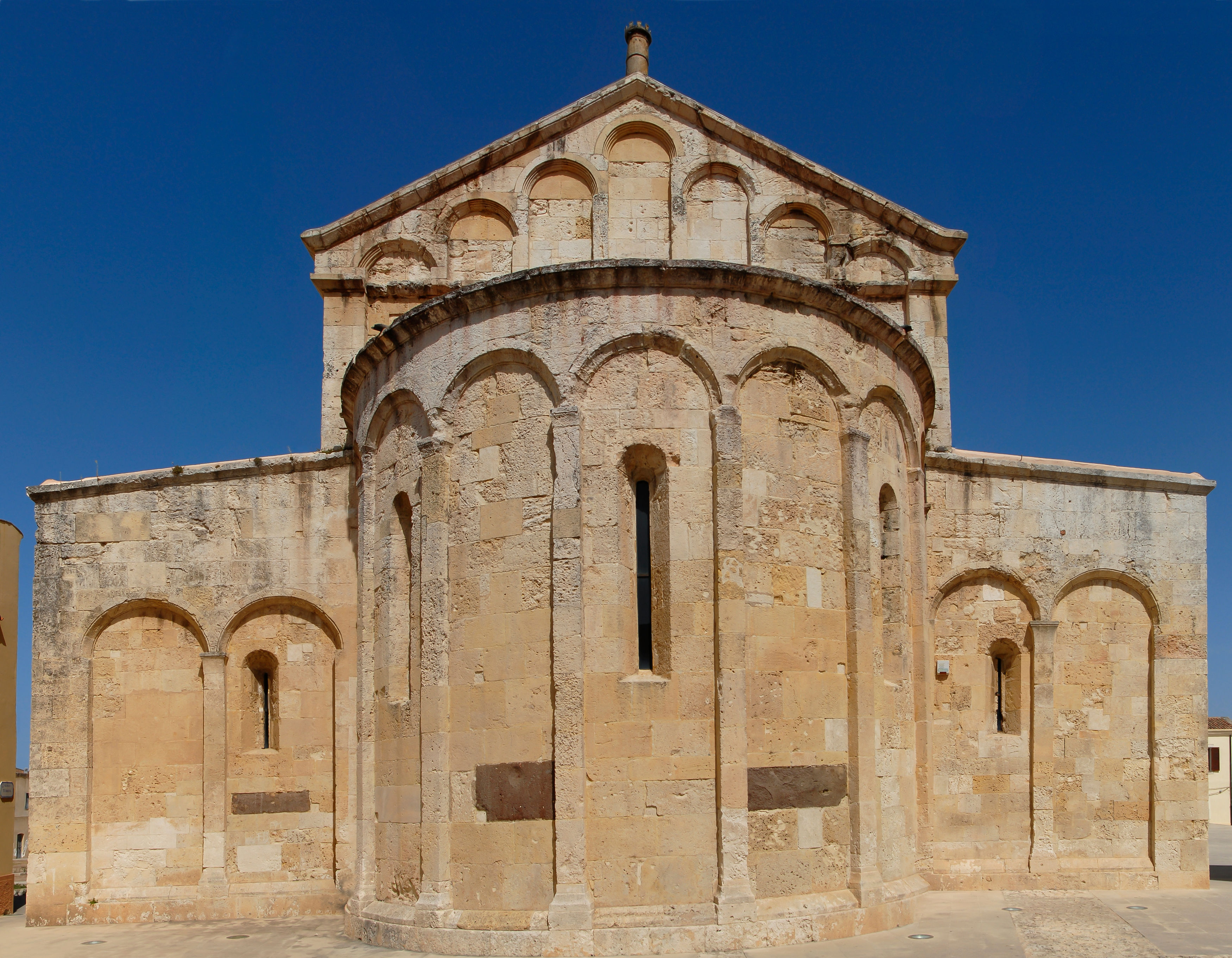
San Gavino Shrine

== See also ==
- List of tourist attractions in Sardinia
- List of archaeological and artistic sites of Sardinia
- Tourism in Italy
- Cuisine of Sardinia
- IT.A.CÀ - Festival of Responsible Tourism

== Bibliography ==
- Touring Club Italiano: Sardegna, Touring Editore 1984. ISBN 88-365-0023-4
- Raffaele Paci, Stefano Usai: L'ultima spiaggia: turismo, economia e sostenibilità ambientale in Sardegna. CUEC 2002. ISBN 88-8467-065-9
- Crenos (a cura di): Economia della Sardegna. Editoriasarda 2007. ISBN 88-8467-382-8
- Brunella Brundu, Turismo e città minori in Sardegna. Alghero e Olbia tra innovazione e percezione, Milano, 2013 ISBN 978-88-204-5790-7
- Bachisio Bandinu: Costa Smeralda. Come nasce una favola turistica, Milano, Rizzoli, 1980
- Sandro Roggio: I cinquant'anni della Costa Smeralda, in La Nuova Sardegna, 25 settembre 2011
