= Bithia =

Bithia may refer to:

- Bithia or Bithiah, a traditional name attributed to the biblical Pharaoh's daughter
- Bithia, a city in ancient Sardinia and Corsica
