= Chia (Sardinia) =

- Frazione
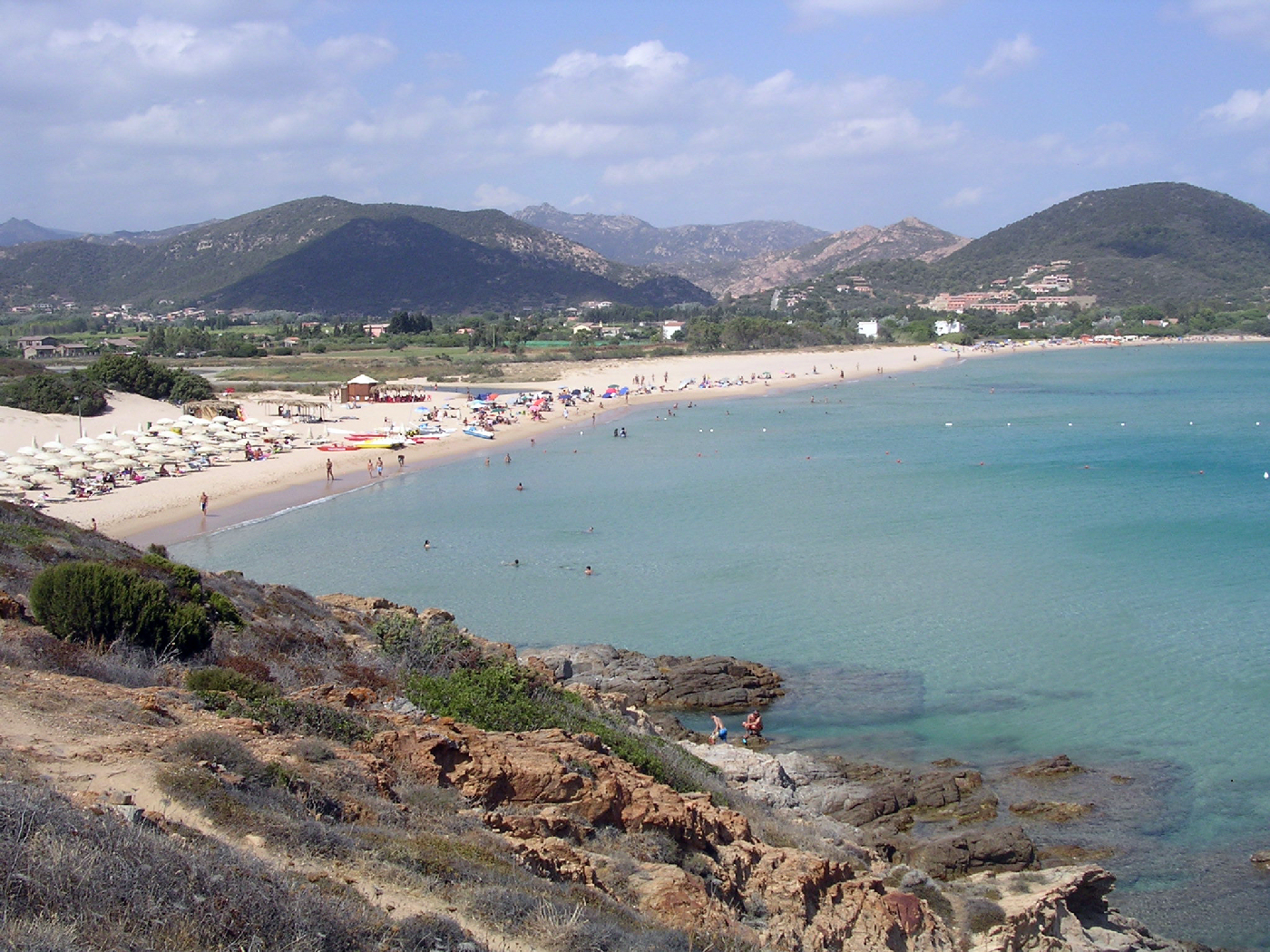
- View of Chia beach and bay

- Location of Chia in Italy
- Coordinates: 38°54′31″N 8°52′50″E
- Country: Italy
- Region: Sardinia
- Province: South Sardinia (SU)
- Comune: Domus de Maria
- Elevation: 5 m (16 ft)
- Time zone: UTC+1 (CET)
  - Summer (DST): UTC+2 (CEST)
- Postal code: 09010
- Dialing code: (+39) 070

Chia (pronounced [ˈkiː.a]), also named Baia di Chia, is a coastal area in southern Sardinia (Italy), which is also a village, frazione of the municipality of Domus de Maria, in the Province of South Sardinia. The archeological site of the ancient town of Bithia is located at Chia.

== Territory ==
The territory, in the locality of Chia proper, includes the promontory from which the area known as Capo Spartivento originates. It consists of a narrow coastal plain on which hilly formations prevail, mostly rocky, forming the southern slopes of the Monti del Sulcis.

== Places of natural interest ==
The coastline is composed of several coves, with beaches of fine or coarse light sand, alternating with small rocky promontories. The landscape includes three coastal lagoons, frequented by pink flamingos and other important species: the Chia lagoon (stagno di Chia) to the east, and the lagoons of Su Stangioni de Su Sali and Su Stangioni de Campana to the west, located in the hinterland area. Off the coast, several islets are scattered, the most important of which, from a historical and archaeological perspective, is the islet Su Cardolinu (or Isula Manna).

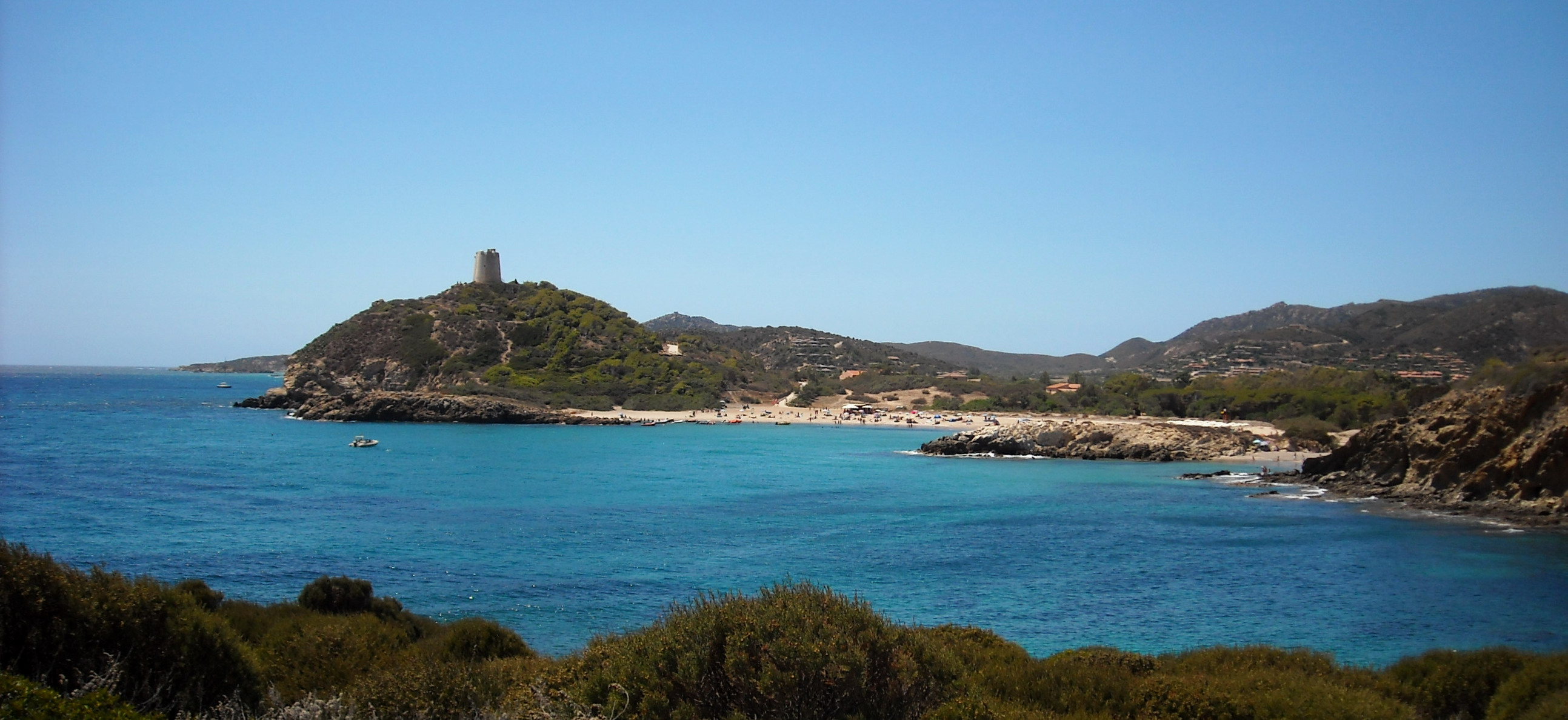
The Bay of Chia

== Beaches and promontories ==
The beaches and promontories, proceeding from east to west, are:

- Cala de sa Musica. A small cove accessible only by sea, completely surrounded by rocky cliffs and overlooked by a hilly formation covered with Mediterranean scrub. From land, it can be observed from above by walking to the beach of Porticciolo.
- Isolotto Su Cardolinu (in Sardinian, *"su fungo"*, the mushroom). Technically a peninsula, as it is connected to the mainland by a narrow sandy isthmus. It has a flat shape and is covered by typical garrigue vegetation. It is accessible on foot from the Porticciolo beach. The islet hosts the remains of the ancient Phoenician settlement of Bithia.
- Il Porticciolo. The most iconic beach of the area, although not the largest. It is a small white sandy beach nestled in a sheltered bay, bordered to the east by Su Cardolinu islet and to the west by the Chia promontory.
- Chia Promontory. A prominent headland that separates the bay of Porticciolo to the east from the long sandy expanse to the west. Its most distinctive feature is the well-preserved Chia Tower.
- Sa Colonia. A white sandy beach, about one kilometer long, enclosed between the promontories of Chia and Monte Cogoni. Together with Porticciolo, it forms one of the main beaches of Chia proper. It separates the open sea from the Chia lagoon.
- Monte Cogoni. Despite being called a “mountain”, it is a modest promontory, just over 60 meters high. Its slopes descend into the sea via cliffs enclosing a small sandy cove.
- Cala del Morto. A small sandy cove overlooked by Monte Cogoni and enclosed by two rocky outcrops.
- Porto Campana. A formation of golden sand dunes, with its back covered by psammophilous shrub vegetation. It is the first beach of the Spartivento dunes heading westward.
- Su Giudeu. Also known as *S’Abba Durci beach* (“sweet water beach”), it is a long sandy stretch that, together with Porto Campana, forms the impressive dune system of Spartivento — one of the largest in southern Sardinia. Behind it lies the Spartivento lagoon, smaller than the Chia lagoon. Su Giudeu beach has been used as a location for films and TV commercials. In front of the beach, very close to the shore, lies the islet of Su Giudeu, easily reachable on foot due to the shallow water separating it from the mainland. The surf zone is separated from Porto Campana’s beach by a small rocky outcrop, while the inland dune system is contiguous.
- Cala Cipolla. Accessible on foot, it is a small, secluded beach nestled in a sheltered inlet, bordered to the east by the promontory that separates it from Su Giudeu and to the west by the cliffs of Capo Spartivento. From Cala Cipolla, a trail leads to the Capo Spartivento Lighthouse, from which the entire southern Sulcis coastline can be viewed.
