= Capo Spartivento Lighthouse =

Lighthouse in Sardinia, Italy

Capo Spartivento
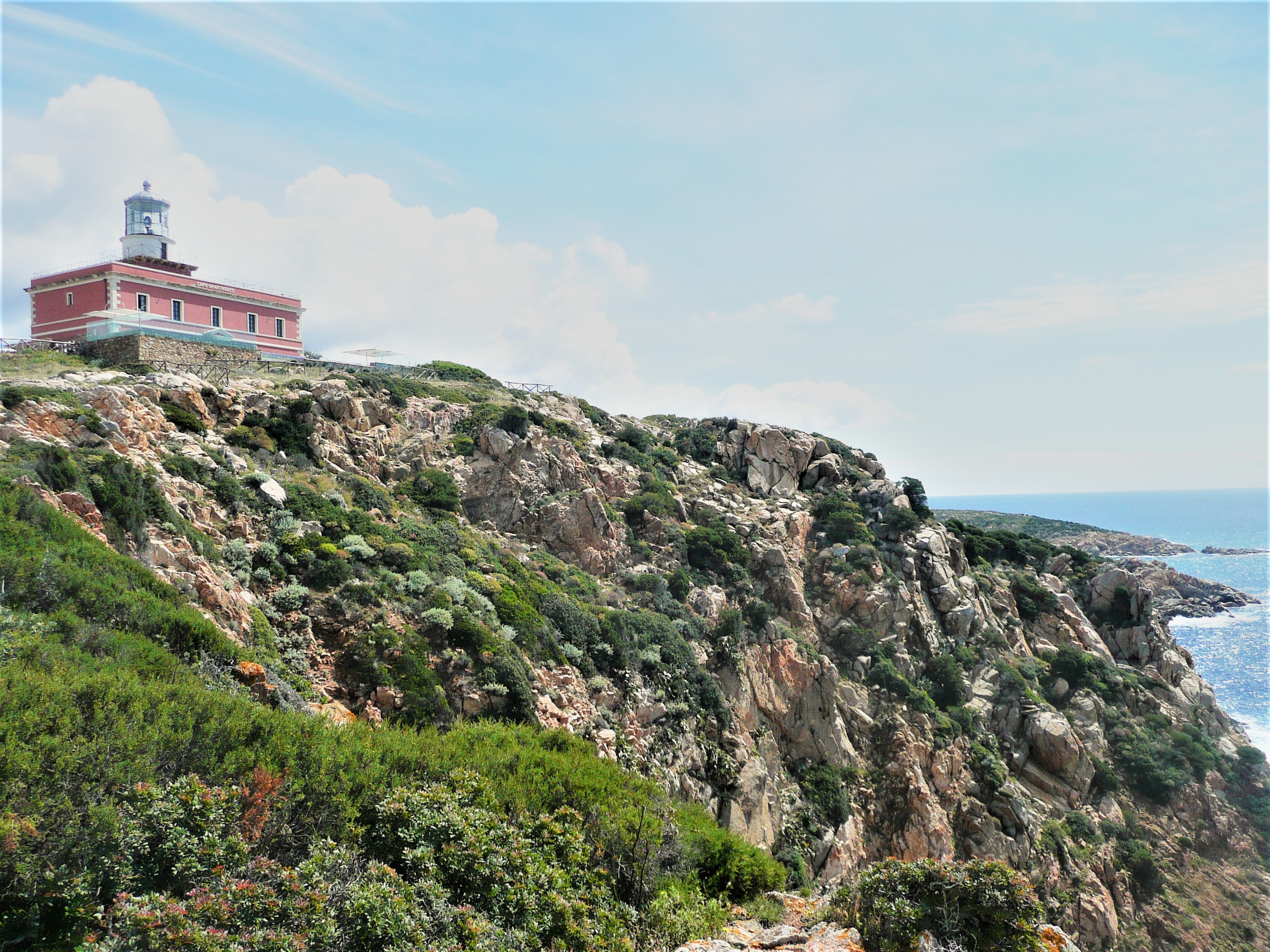
- Capo Spartivento Lighthouse
- Location: Cape Spartivento; Domus de Maria; Sardinia; Italy
- Coordinates: 38°52′40″N 8°50′44″E

Tower
- Constructed: 1866
- Foundation: masonry base
- Construction: masonry tower
- Automated: yes
- Height: 19 metres (62 ft)
- Shape: cylindrical tower with balcony and lantern atop a 2-storey keeper's house
- Markings: white tower, white lantern, grey metallic lantern dome
- Power source: mains electricity
- Operator: Marina Militare
- Fog signal: no

Light
- Focal height: 81 metres (266 ft)
- Lens: Type OR T3; Focal length: 125mm
- Intensity: main: AL 1000 W reserve: LABI 100 W
- Range: main: 22 nautical miles (41 km; 25 mi) reserve: 18 nautical miles (33 km; 21 mi)
- Characteristic: Fl (2) W 10s.
- Italy no.: 1310 E.F.

Capo Spartivento Lighthouse (Italian: Faro di Capo Spartivento) is an active lighthouse located on Cape Spartivento promontory which is the southernmost point of Sardinia and represents the eastern boundary of the Gulf of Teulada and the western limit of the Gulf of Cagliari on the Tyrrhenian Sea. The structure is situated in the municipality of Domus de Maria.

== Description ==
The lighthouse was built in 1866 and consists of a masonry cylindrical tower, 19 metres (62 ft) high, with balcony and lantern rising from a 2-storey keeper's house. The building, painted in red with white trim, was in poor condition and was restored in 2006 and transformed into a luxury resort, with four suites and swimming pool, as the adjacent building. The tower is painted white and the lantern, which mounts a Type OR T3 optics with a Focal length of 125mm, in grey metallic. The light is positioned at 81 metres (266 ft) above sea level and emits two white flashes in a 10 seconds period visible up to a distance of 22 nautical miles (41 km; 25 mi). The lighthouse is completely automated and managed by the Marina Militare with the identification code number 1310 E.F.

== See also ==
- List of lighthouses in Italy
- Cape Spartivento
