= Bithia, Italy =

Archaeological site in Sardinia, Italy

Bithia
- Bitan
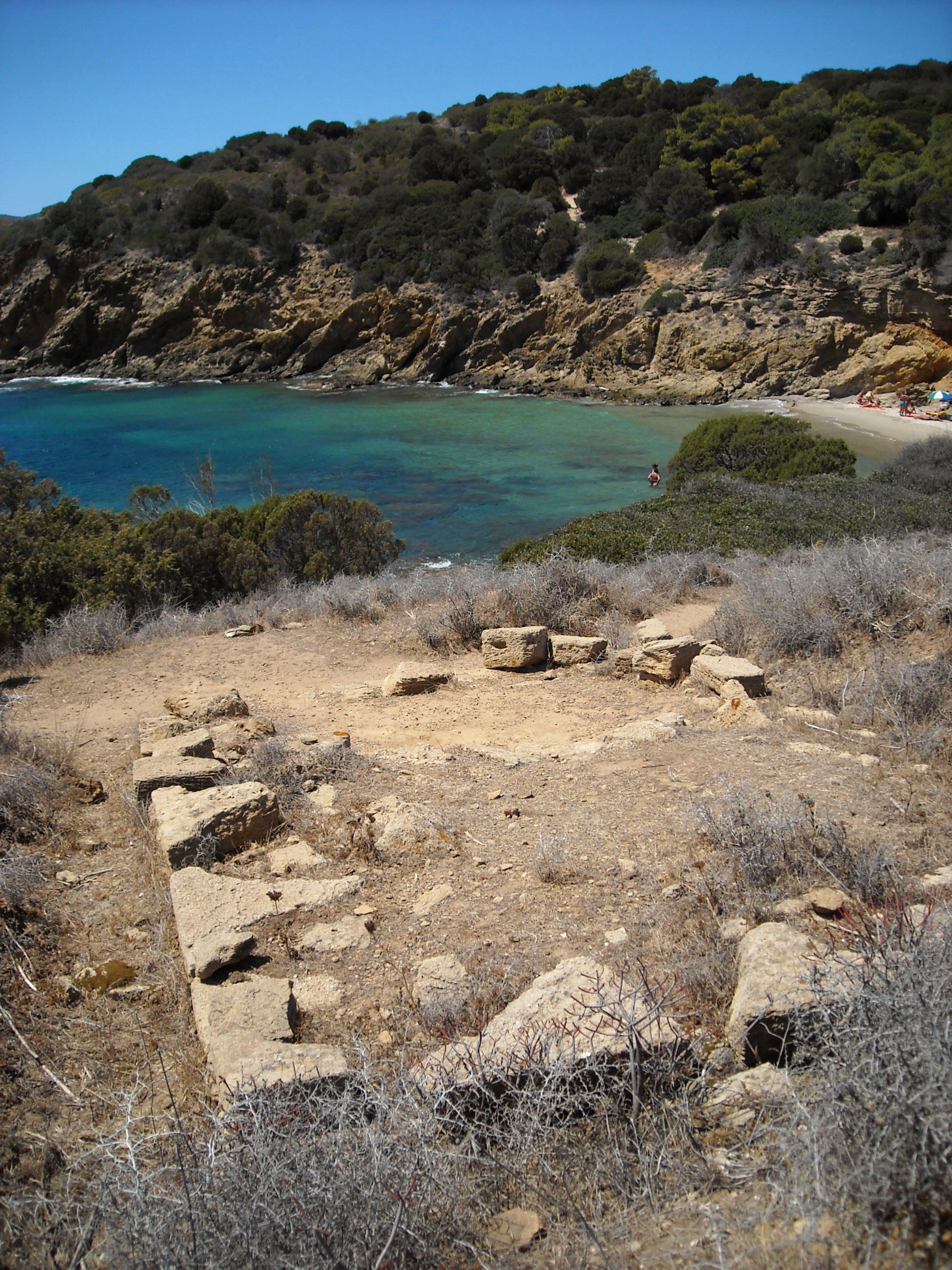
- Ruins at Bithia

- Location within Italy
- 38°53′45″N 8°53′7″E
- Type: Settlement
- Location: Chia, South Sardinia, Sardinia, Italy

Bithia or Bitia was a Phoenician, Carthaginian, and Roman town located near Chia in the extreme south of Sardinia, Italy. Most of the ruins have been submerged underwater.

== History ==
Bithia was founded by the Phoenicians in the 8th century BC as Bitan (Punic: 𐤁𐤉𐤕𐤏𐤍, bytʿn, "Palace"). It fell under Carthaginian control until the Punic Wars, when it became Roman. Punic culture survived well into the Roman period. It was abandoned in the early 7th century, when the population fled inland to escape Arab raids.

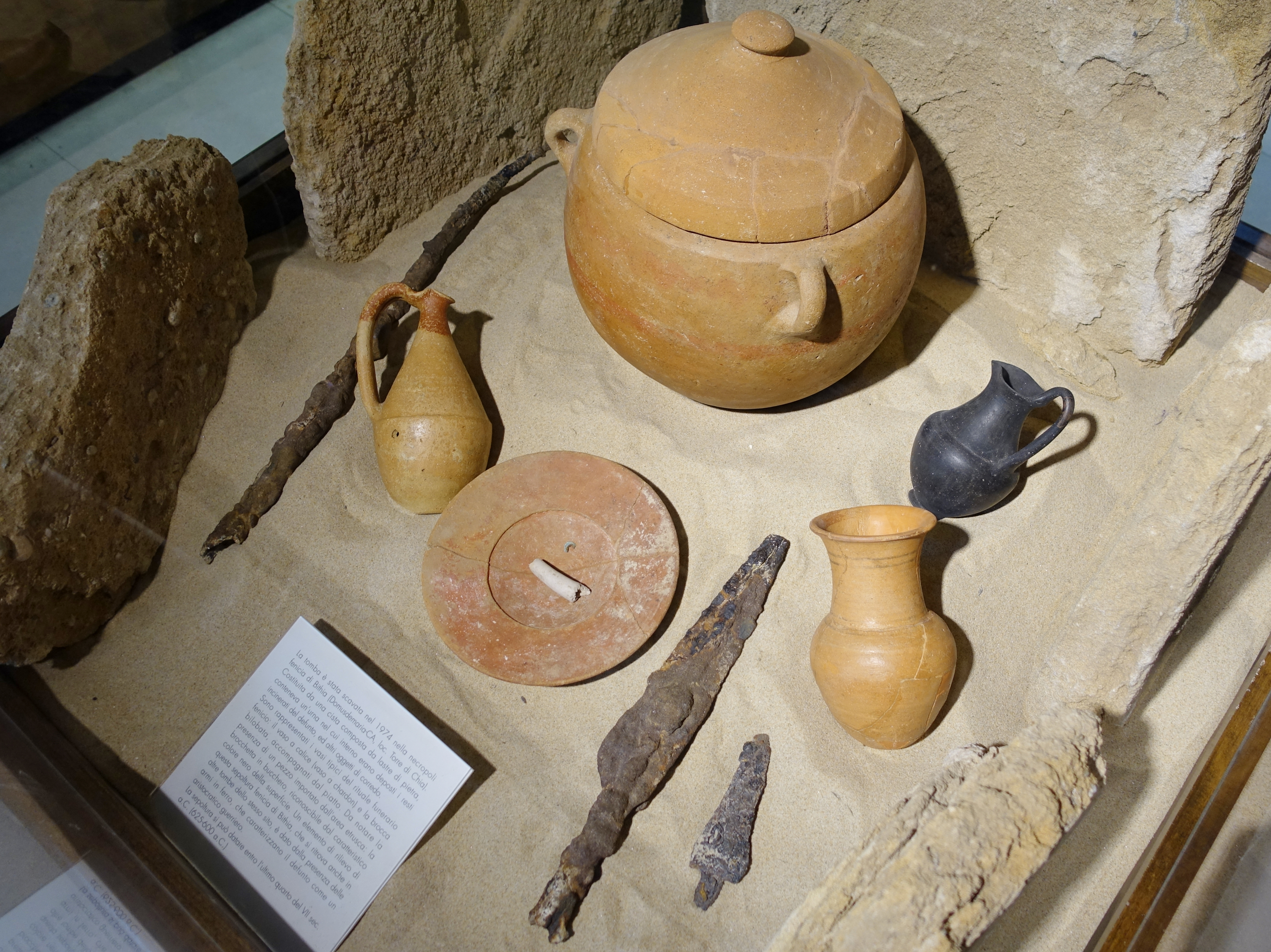
Grave from the necropolis of Bithia

In 1963, following heavy storms, some ruins of the city came to light. Still observable are the remains of a Punic temple on the island of Cardolinu, on which are also found artifacts that seem to indicate the presence of a tophet. Additional remains of houses and a second temple dedicated to Bes are located at the foot of the promontory on which stands the Spanish tower called "Chia", the current name of the modern village.
