= Domus de Maria =

- Comune
- Comune di Domus de Maria
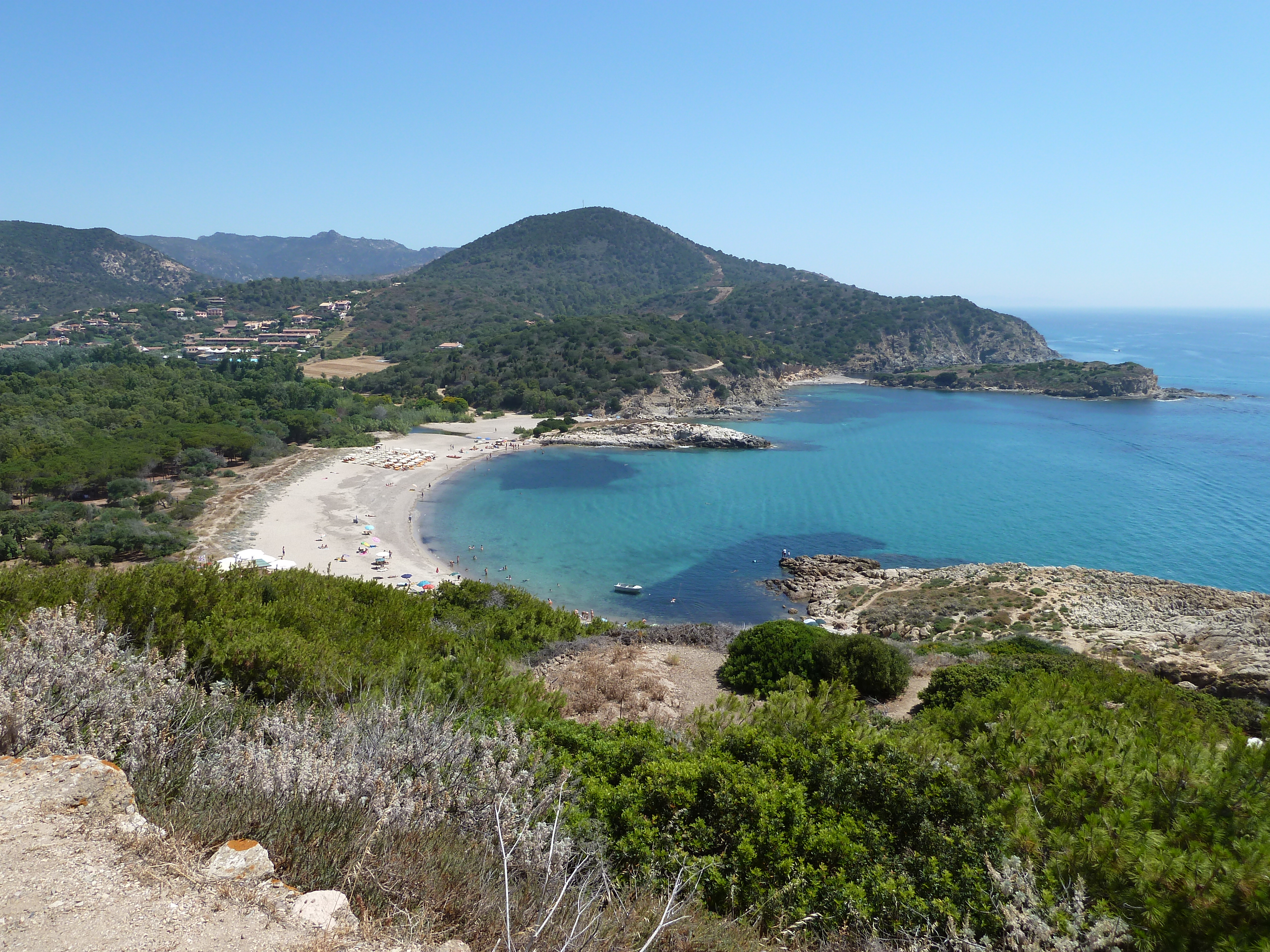
- The beach of Chia

- Domus de Maria within the Province of Cagliari

- Location within Sardinia
- Coordinates: 38°57′N 8°52′E
- Country: Italy
- Region: Sardinia
- Metropolitan city: Cagliari
- Frazioni: Chia, Eden Rock, Setti Ballas

Government
  - Mayor: Maria Concetta Spada

Area
  - Total: 97.14 km^{2} (37.51 sq mi)
- Elevation: 66 m (217 ft)

Population (2026)
  - Total: 1,630
  - Density: 16.8/km^{2} (43.5/sq mi)
- Time zone: UTC+1 (CET)
  - Summer (DST): UTC+2 (CEST)
- Postal code: 09010
- Dialing code: 070
- Website: Official website

Domus de Maria is a town and comune (municipality) in the Metropolitan City of Cagliari in the autonomous island region of Sardinia in Italy, located about 35 kilometres (22 mi) southwest of Cagliari. It has 1,630 inhabitants.

Domus de Maria borders the municipalities of Pula, Santadi, and Teulada.

== Demographics ==
As of 2026, the population is 1,630, of which 50.1% are male, and 49.9% are female. Minors make up 10.3% of the population, and seniors make up 32.4%.

Historical population

Year	Pop.	±%
1861	721	—
1871	679	−5.8%
1881	644	−5.2%
1901	835	+29.7%
1911	840	+0.6%
1921	774	−7.9%
1931	819	+5.8%
1936	918	+12.1%

Year	Pop.	±%
1951	1,315	+43.2%
1961	1,360	+3.4%
1971	1,329	−2.3%
1981	1,392	+4.7%
1991	1,444	+3.7%
2001	1,545	+7.0%
2011	1,675	+8.4%
2021	1,628	−2.8%

Source: ISTAT

=== Immigration ===
As of 2025, of the known countries of birth of 1,627 residents, the most numerous are: Italy (1,555 – 95.6%), Germany (12 – 0.7%), Romania (11 – 0.7%).

== See also ==
- Capo Spartivento Lighthouse
