= List of tourist attractions in Sardinia =

This is a list of the most famous tourist destinations of Sardinia. Minor islands are included from Olbia, clockwise — industrial sites are not included.

== Main towns ==
- Cagliari
- Sassari
- Olbia
- Iglesias
- Carbonia
- Tempio
- Alghero
- Nuoro
- Oristano
- Porto Torres

== Other locations ==
- Abbatoggia
- Abbiadori
- Abi d'Oru
- Achivoni
- Aglientina
- Agrustos
- Antigori
- Appiu
- Arbatax
- Argentiera
- Arzachena
- Ba Cerbus
- Baccu Arrodas
- Badesi a Mare
- Baia Caddinas
- Baiocca
- Baja Sardinia
- Bari Sardo
- Barisoni
- Barrabisa
- Barrettini, island
- Baunei
- Becco di Vela
- Berchida
- Biancareddu
- Bithia
- Bosa
- Budelli, island
- Budoni
- Buggerru
- Cabu Abbas
- Cala Calcina
- Cala Colba
- Cala de su Pallosu
- Cala di Volpe
- Cala domestica
- Cala d'Ostia
- Cala Galera di Alghero
- Cala Ginepro
- Cala Girgolu
- Cala Gonone
- Cala Liberotto
- Cala lunga
- Cala Mandriola
- Cala Mariolu
- Cala Mezzaluna
- Cala Piombo
- Cala Pira
- Cala Regina
- Cala Saline di Sinis
- Cala Sassari
- Cala Sinzias
- Cala Sisine
- Cala Vallalta
- Cala Vinagra
- Calasetta
- Canisoni
- Cannai
- Cannigione
- Capannaccia
- Capitana
- Capo Argentiera
- Capo Caccia
- Capo Carbonara
- Capo Coda Cavallo
- Capo Comino
- Capo di Ferro
- Capo Ferrato
- Capo Figari
- Capo Frasca
- Capo Malfatano
- Capo Mannu
- Capo Marrargiu
- Capo Pecora
- Capo Sa Sturaggia
- Capo Spartivento
- Capo Sperone
- Capo Teulada
- Capoterra
- Caprera
- Capriccioli
- Cardedu
- Carloforte
- Casaraccio
- Case Azara
- Castelsardo
- Castiadas
- Chia Laguna
- Chia
- Ciuchesu
- Codaruina
- Colostrai
- Columbargia
- Corcelli, island
- Corona niedda
- Costa Paradiso
- Costa Rei
- Costa Smeralda
- Cugnana
- Cuile novu
- Cuile Santu Larentu
- Domus de Maria
- Dorgali
- Figarolo, island
- Flumentargiu
- Flumini
- Flummene
- Fontanamare
- Forte Cappellini
- Foxi
- Gairo
- Geremeas
- Ghisciera
- Giardone
- Giba
- Gibas
- Girasole
- Golfo Aranci
- Gonnesa
- Grotta dei Ricami
- Grotta di Ispignoli
- Grotta di Nettuno
- Grotta Verde
- Guardia de Is Morus
- Guardiavecchia
- Ingurtosu
- Is Arenas
- Iscala de sale
- Isola dei Cappuccini
- Isola dei Cavoli
- Isola dei Gabbiani
- Isola dei Monaci
- Isola dei Porri
- Isola dei Soffi
- Isola del Corno
- Isola del Porco
- Isola della Maddalena di Alghero
- Isola della Maddalena
- Isola della Vacca
- Isola delle Bisce
- Isola di San Pietro
- Isola di Santo Stefano della Maddalena
- Isola Foradada
- Isola le Camere
- Isola Monica
- Isola Pagliosa
- Isola Pecora di Caprera
- Isola Piana della Maddalena
- Isola Piana di Alghero
- Isola Piana
- Isola Piana
- Isola Rossa di Bosa
- Isola Rossa di Costa Paradiso
- Isola Rossa di Teulada
- Isola Serpentara
- Isole di Nibani
- Ispinigoli
- Isuledda
- Jerzu
- La Caletta
- La Cinta
- La Licciola
- La Presa, island
- Laccuneddas
- Laconia, Sardinia
- Laguna di Chia
- Li Canneddi
- Lido del Sole
- Limpiddu
- Liscia di Vacca
- Lotzorai
- Lu Bagnu
- Luggerras
- Madonnetta
- Magomadas
- Mal di Ventre
- Mandras
- Mari Ermi
- Marina di Arbus
- Marina di Sorso
- Marina Seada
- Marinella
- Maristella
- Marmorata island
- Matzaccara
- Melisenda
- Mesau
- Minciaredda
- Miriacheddu
- Molara island
- Molarotto island
- Moneta, La Maddalena
- Monte ltura
- Monte Russu
- Montelongu
- Montemannu
- Montepetrosu
- Montevecchio Marina
- Mortorio
- Mugoni
- Muravera
- Murta Maria
- Murtas
- Narbolia
- Nebida
- Nora
- Notteri
- Orosei
- Orvile
- Osalla
- Palau
- Palmas
- Palmavera
- Pan di Zucchero
- Paule 'e Mare
- Pedrami island
- Peschiera
- Pevero
- Picci
- Piscina Rei
- Piscinas
- Pitrizza
- Pittinuri
- Pittulongu
- Platamona
- Poetto
- Portixeddu
- Porto Alabe
- Porto Botte
- Porto Cervo
- Porto Conte
- Porto Corallo
- Porto Ferro
- Porto Flavia
- Porto Foxi
- Porto Istana
- Porto Liccia
- Porto Liscia
- Porto Malfatano
- Porto Ottiolu
- Porto Paglia
- Porto Palma
- Porto Palmas
- Porto Pino
- Porto Pozzo
- Porto Puddu
- Porto Rafael
- Porto Rotondo
- Porto San Paolo
- Porto Scudo
- Porto Taverna
- Porto Zafferano
- Portobello di Gallura
- Posada
- Pozzo San Nicola
- Pula
- Punta Aldia
- Punta Battistone
- Punta Campulandru
- Punta Capaccio
- Punta de Foghe
- Punta de Li Francesi
- Punta del Giglio
- Punta della Volpe
- Punta delle casette
- Punta Don Diego
- Punta Maimoni
- Punta Menga
- Punta Molentis
- Punta Sardegna
- Punta Tramontana
- Putzu Idu
- Quartu Sant'Elena
- Razzoli, island
- Romazzino
- Rudalza
- Sa Marigosa
- Sa Pretta Ruja
- Sa Scrocca Manna
- Saboni
- San Giovanni di Alghero
- San Giovanni di Posada
- San Giovanni di Sinis
- San Michele di Quirra
- San Pantaleo
- San Priamo
- San Teodoro
- Santa Caterina de Pittinuri
- Santa Lucia
- Santa Margerita di Sardegna
- Santa Maria Navarrese
- Santa Maria, island
- Santa Reparata
- Santa Teresa Gallura
- Sant'Anna Arresi
- Sant'Anna di Posada
- Sant'Antioco, island
- Sant'Elia
- Santu Juanne
- S'Archittu
- Sarraia
- Sarroch
- Scogli Forani
- Scoglietti
- Scoglio Businco
- Sella del Diavolo
- S'ena 'e sa chitta
- Sferracavallo
- Simius
- Solanas
- Solinas
- Sorso
- Sos Attentos
- Spargi, island
- Spargiotto, island
- Spiaggia delle Bombarde
- Stagno di Maestrale
- Stagno di Santa Caterina
- Stintino
- Su Puttu
- Su Tiriardzu
- Sulci
- Tanaunella
- Tavolara Island
- Tertenia
- Teulada
- Tharros
- Tonnara Saline
- Torre Argentina
- Torre Falcone
- Torre Mortorio
- Torre negra
- Torre Pelosa
- Torre Poglina
- Torre Santa Caterina
- Torre Zavorra
- Tortolì
- Tresnuraghes
- Trinità d'Agultu
- Tuaredda
- Vignola di Gallura
- Villa d'Orri
- Villa San Pietro
- Villaputzu
- Villarios
- Villasimius
- Zafferaneddu

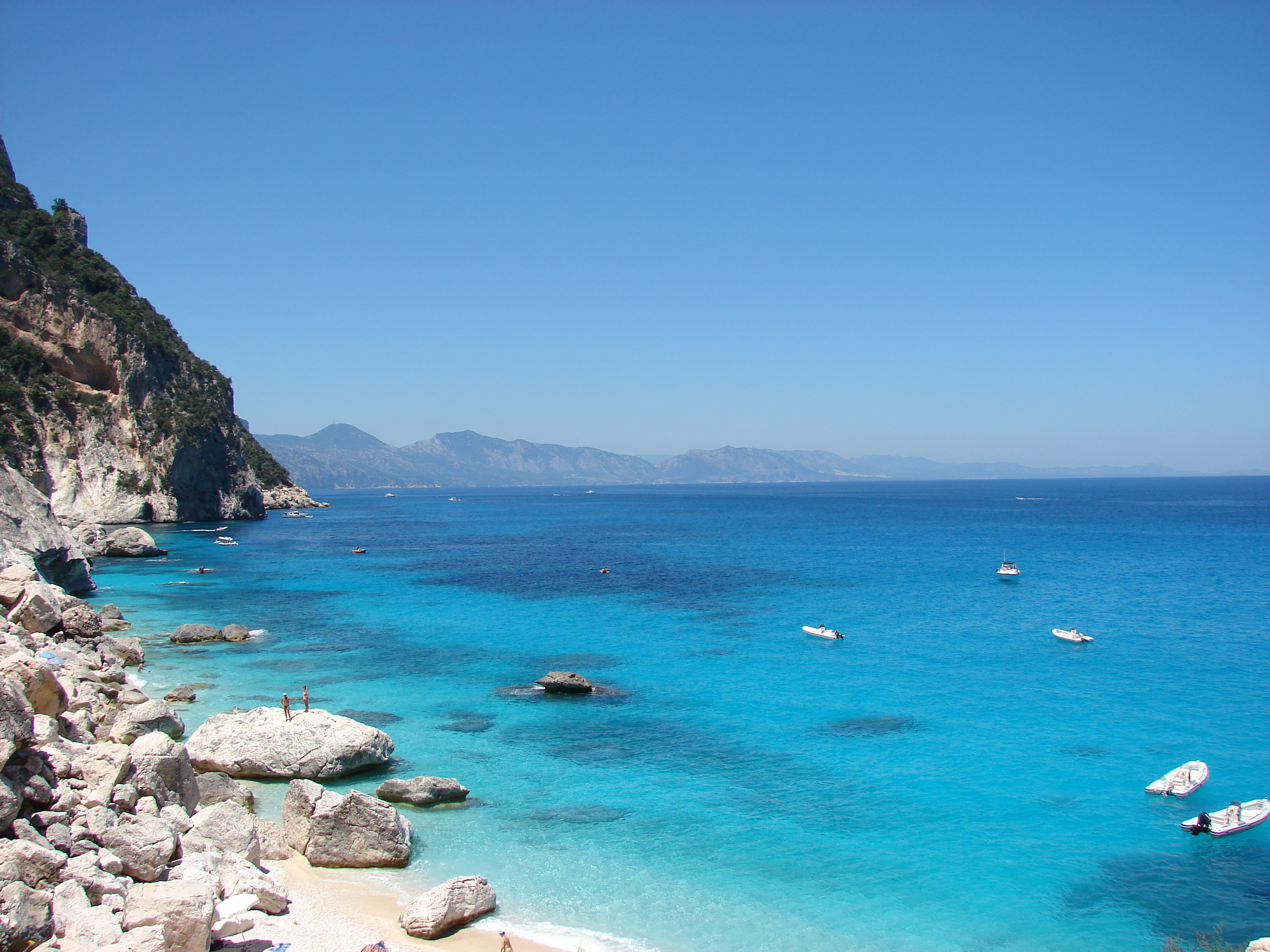
Cala Goloritze - Gulf of Orosei

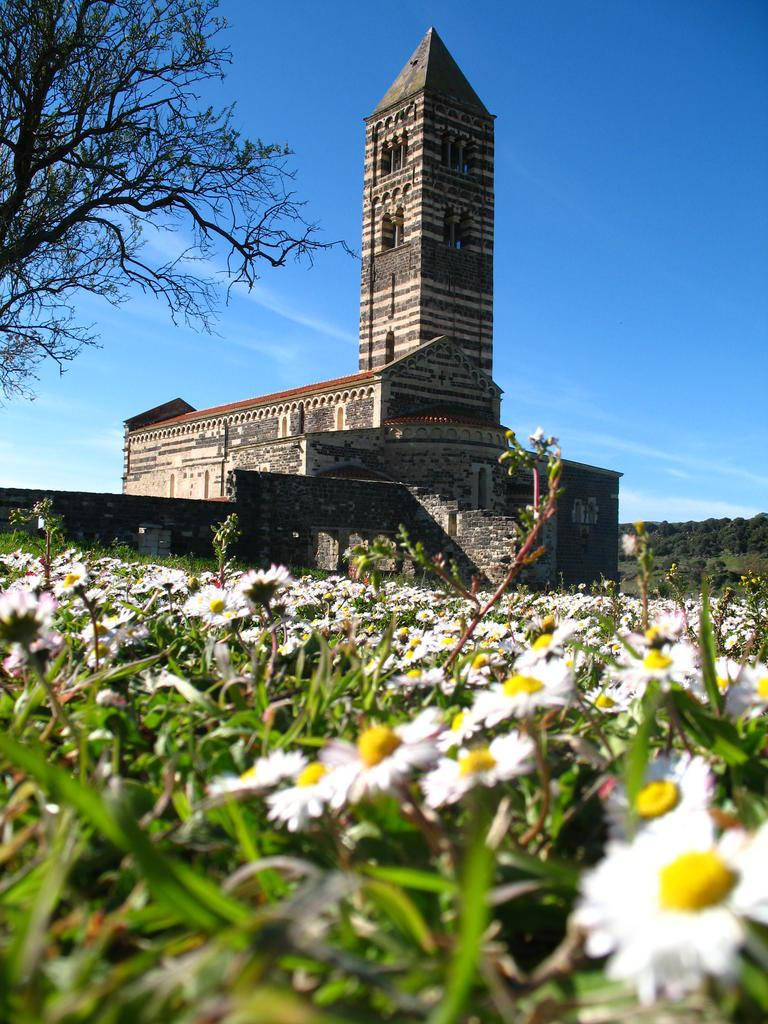
Basilica of Saccargia

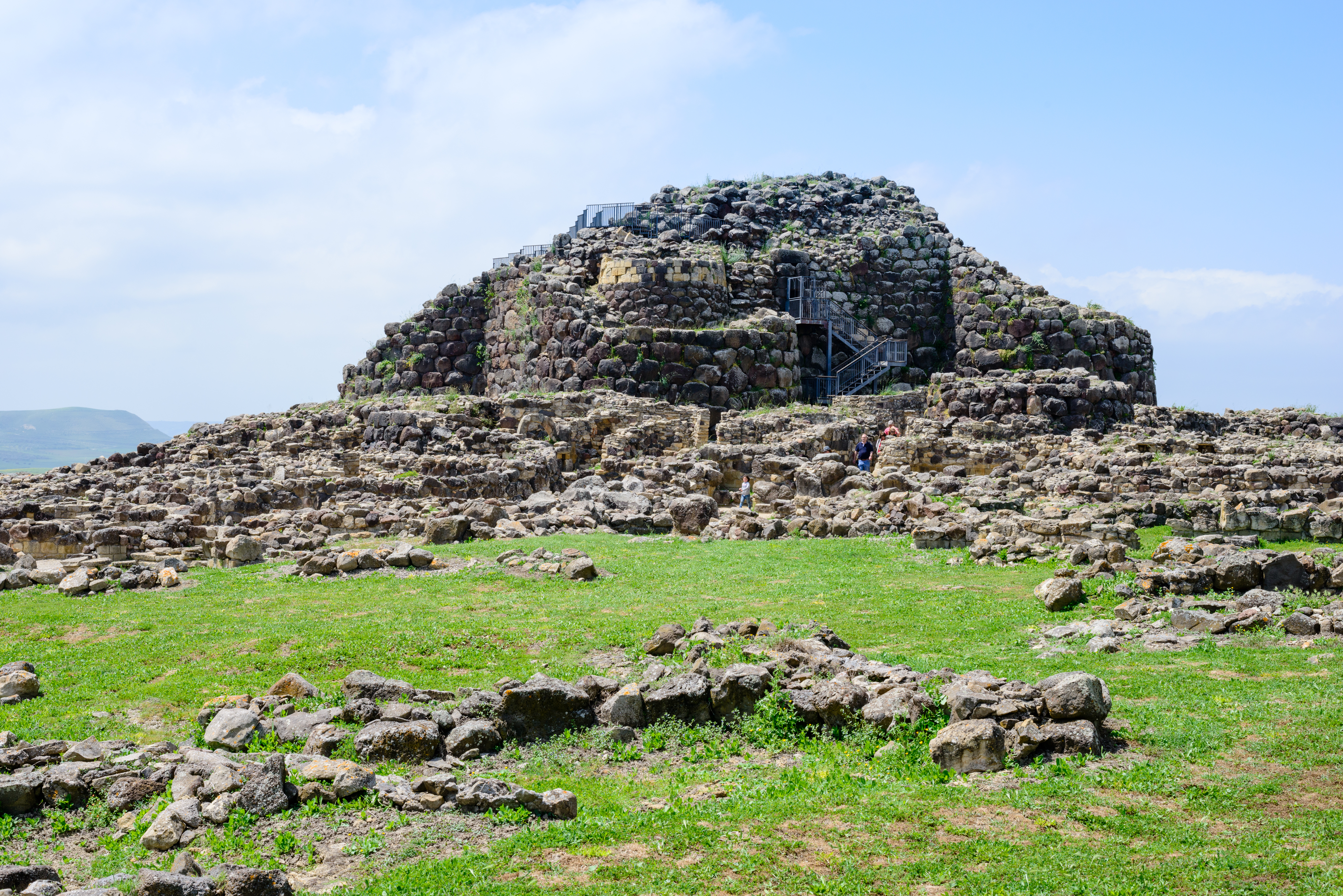
Su Nuraxi

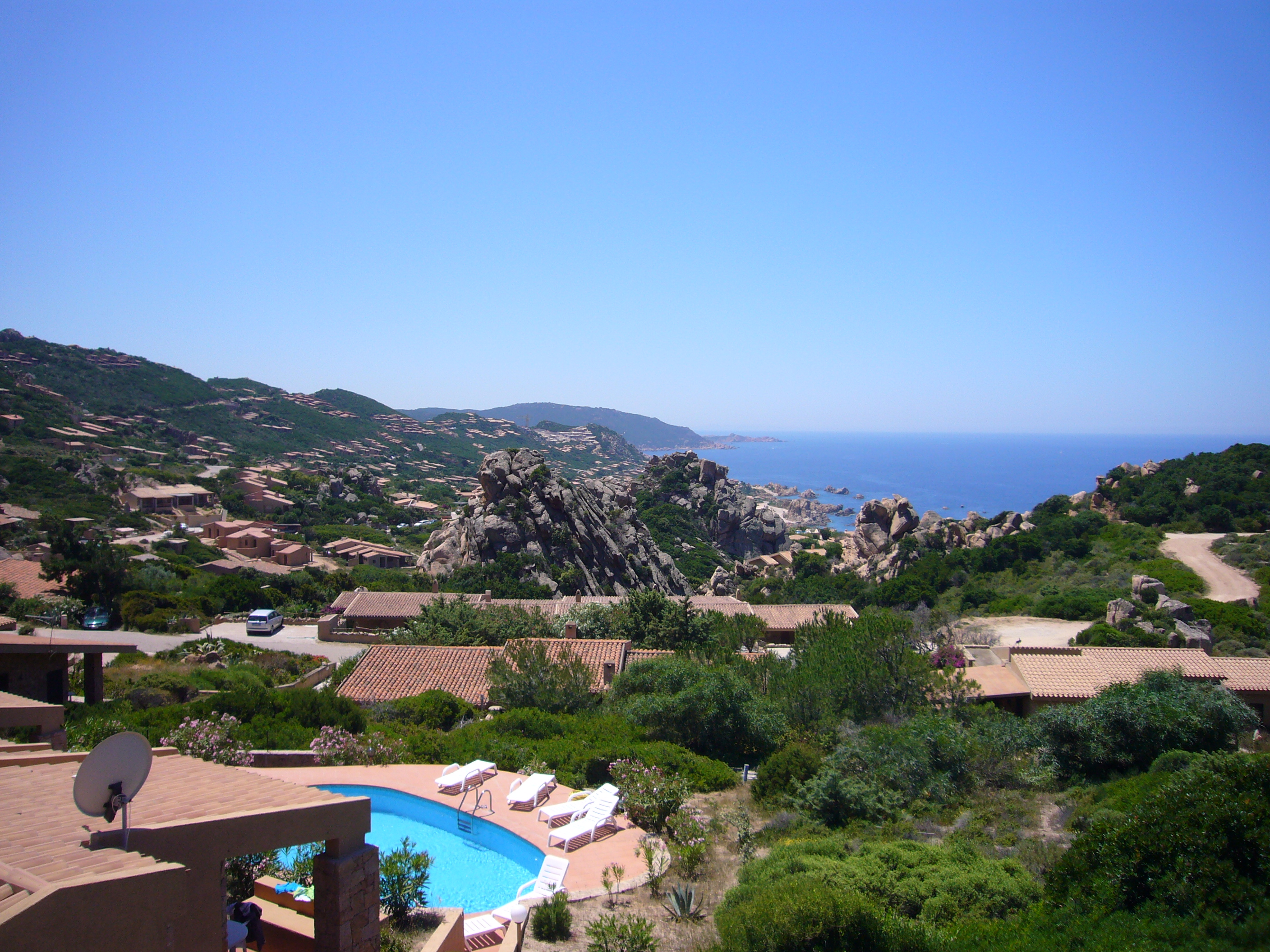
Costa Paradiso

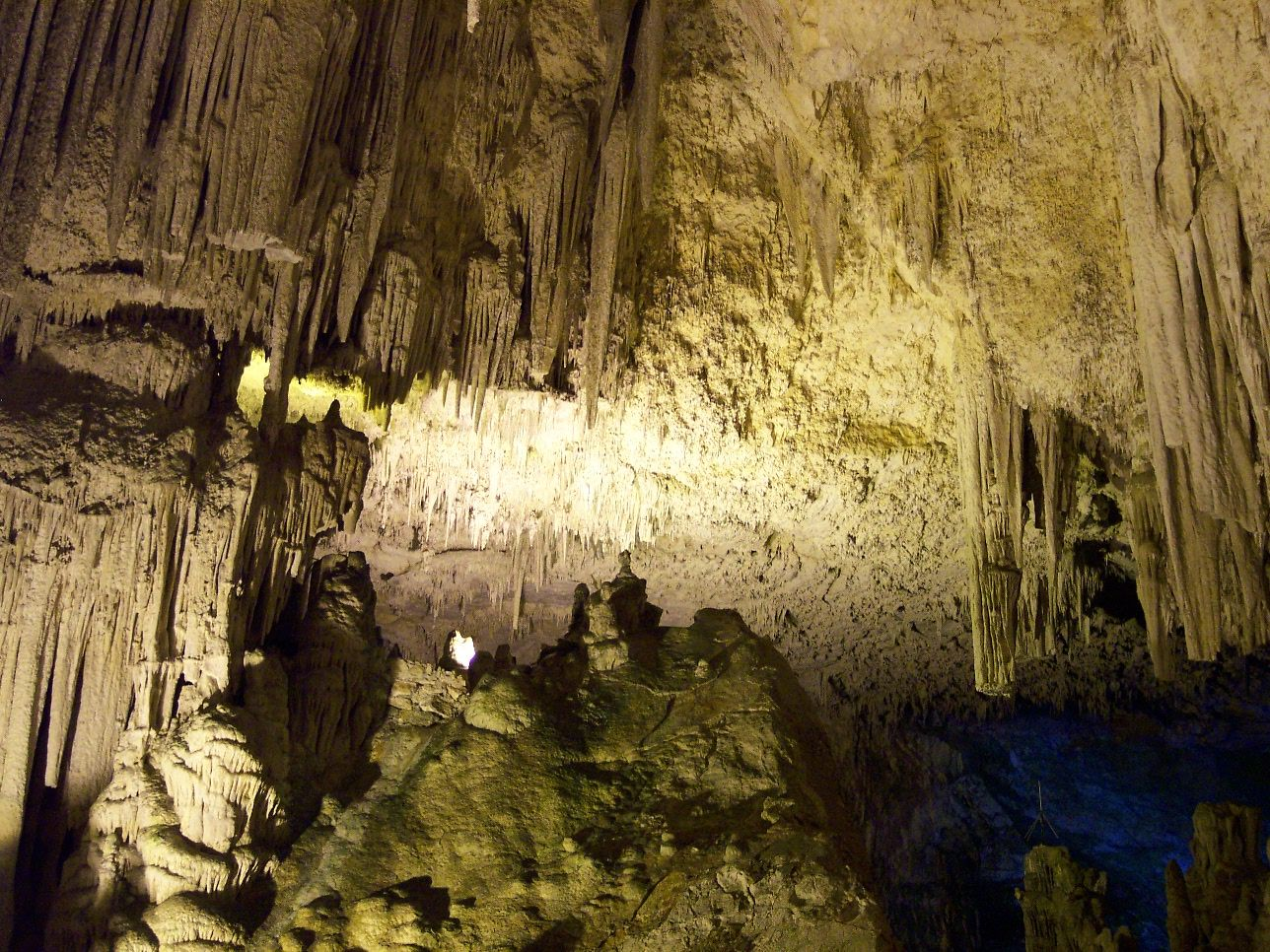
Grotta di Nettuno - cave interior

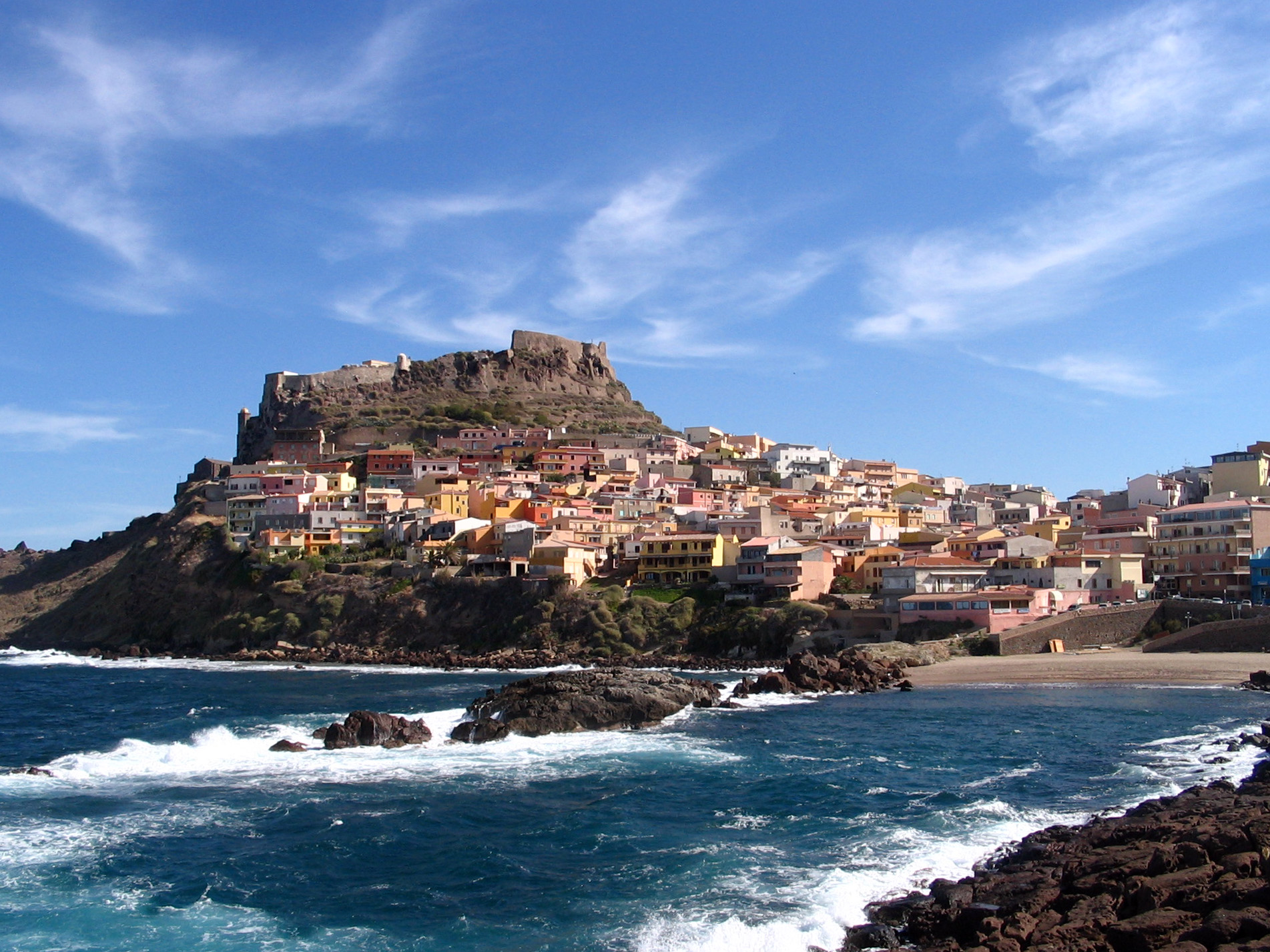
Castelsardo

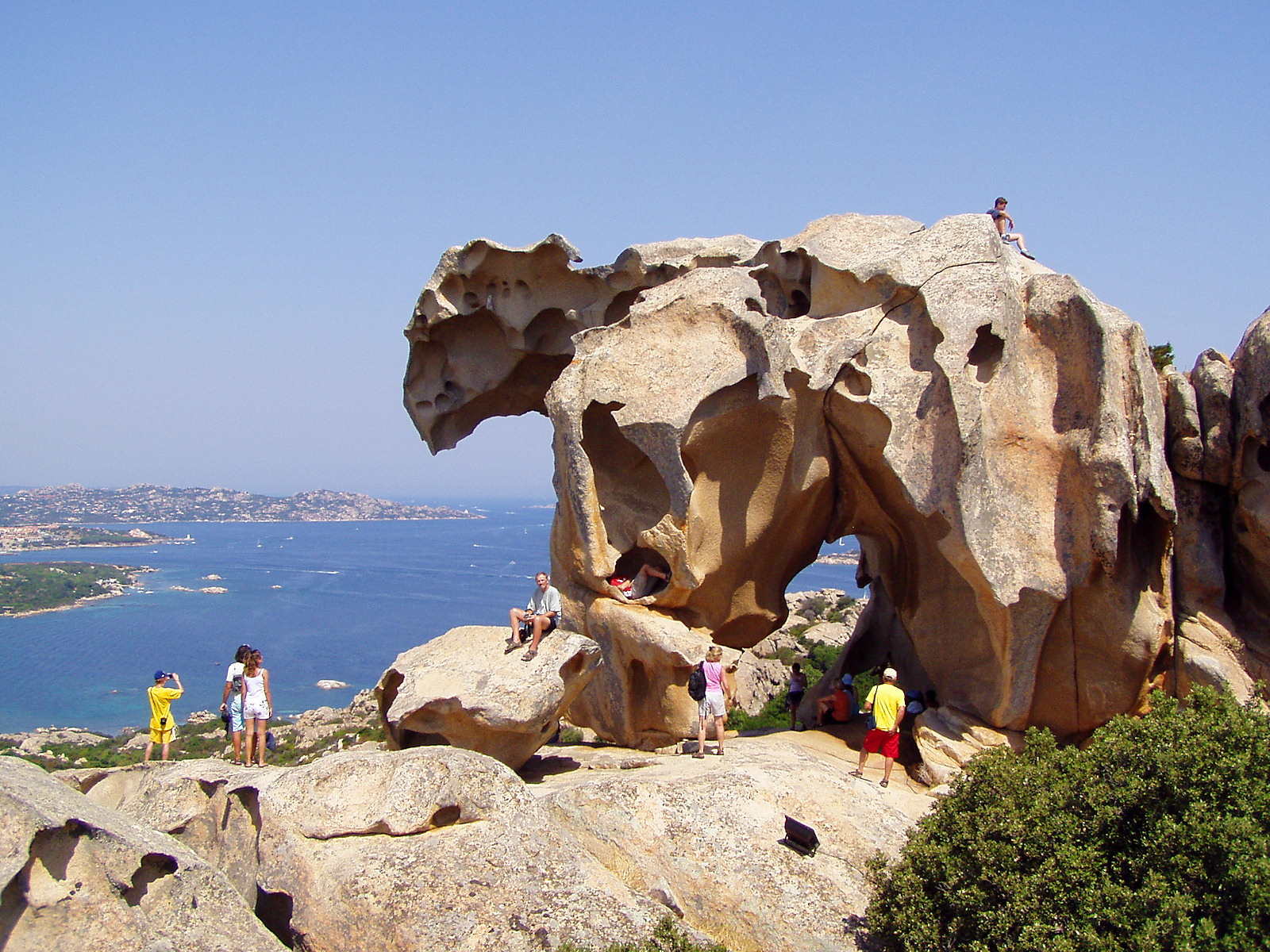
Palau - Capo d'Orso

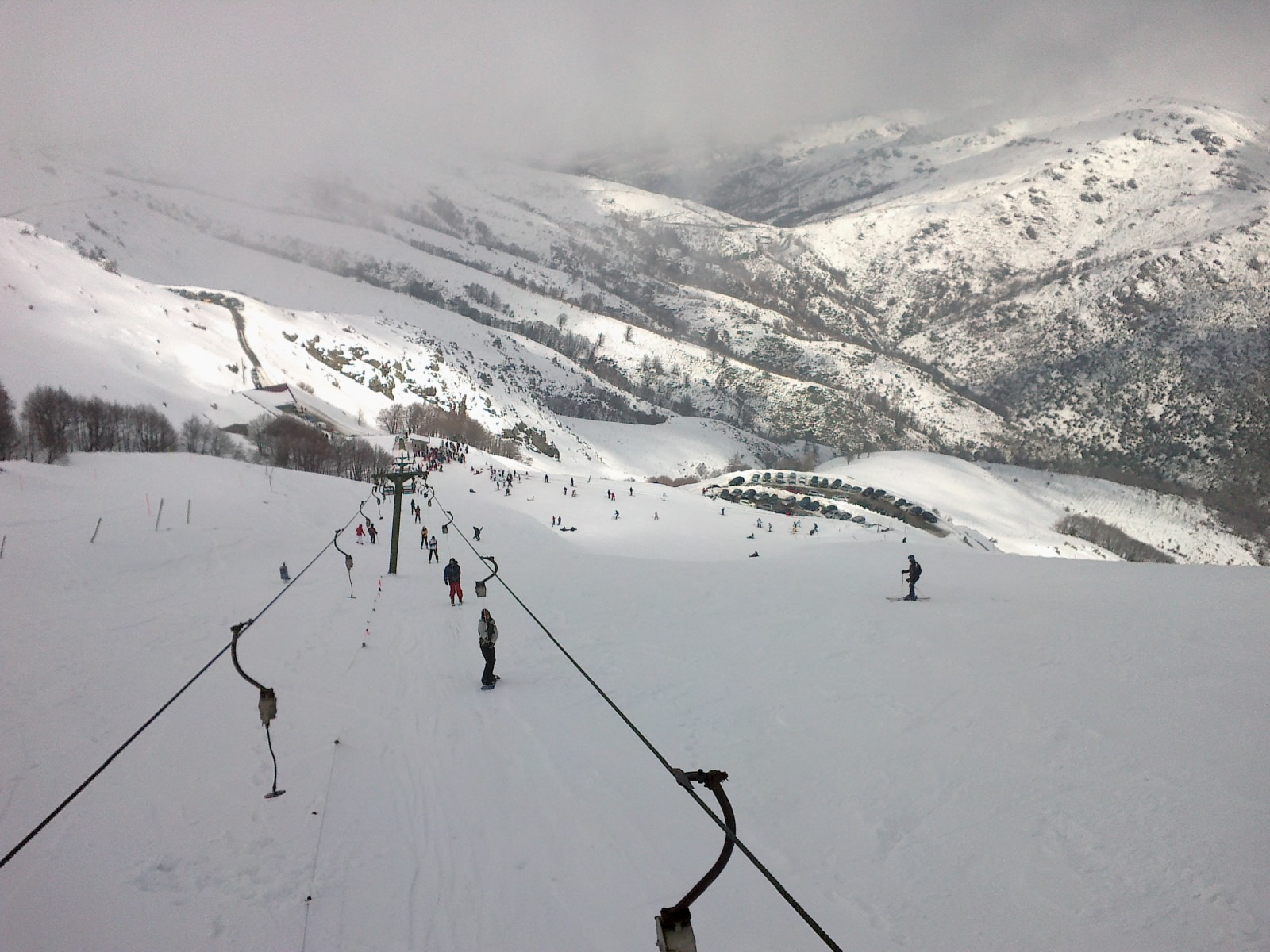
Bruncu Spina

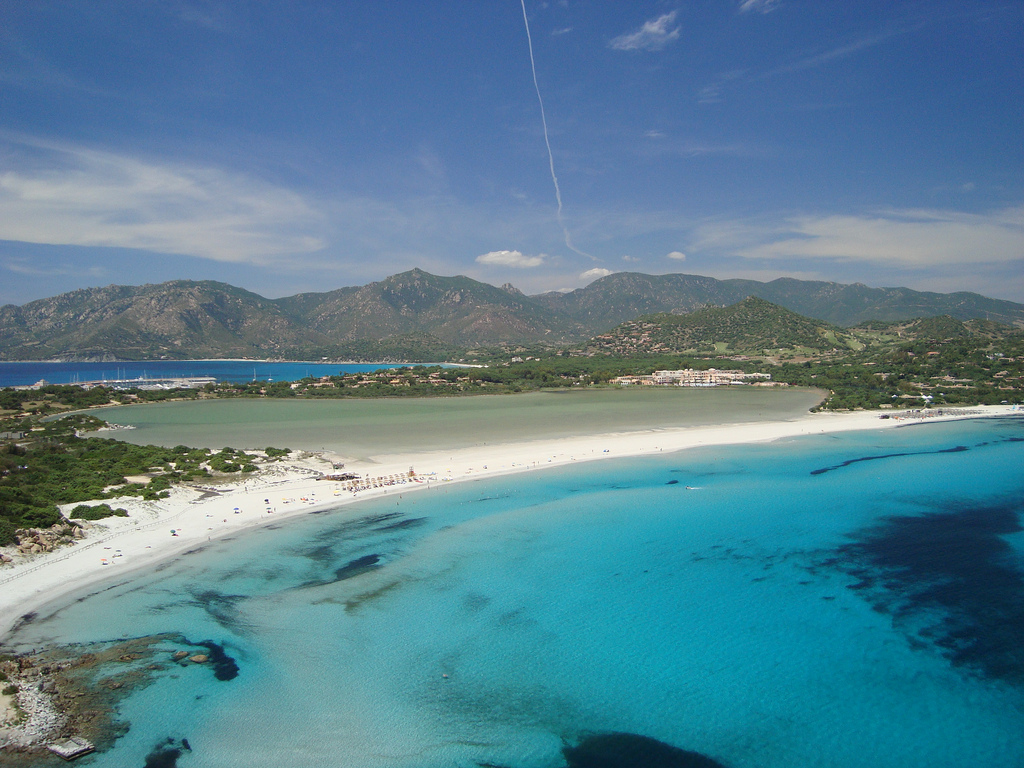
Villasimius

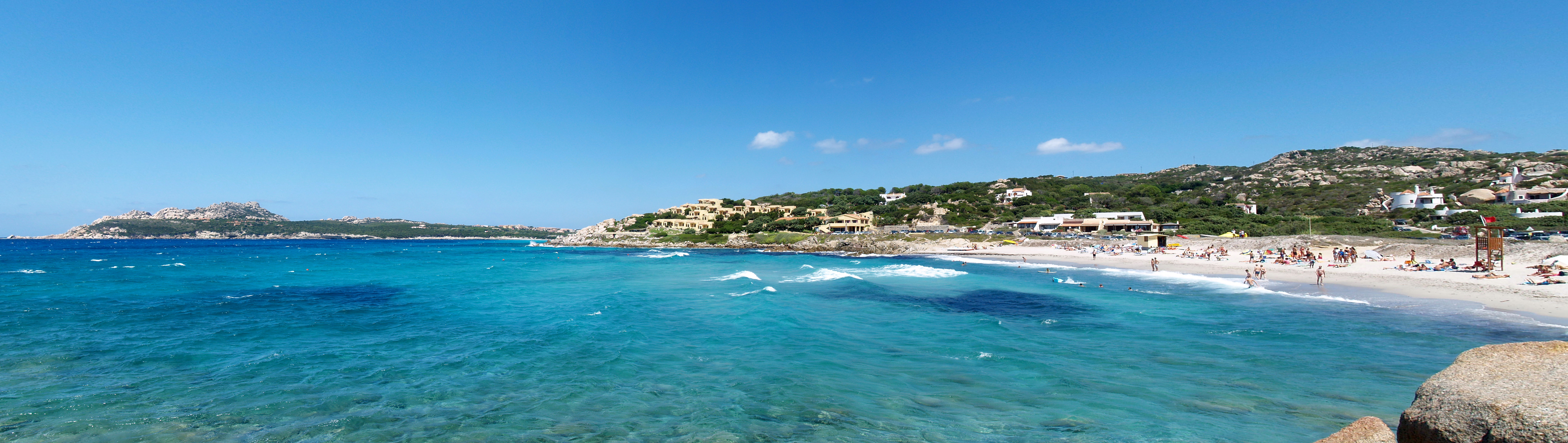
Capo Testa

== See also ==
- List of archaeological and artistic sites of Sardinia
- Sardinia
- Sardinian towns
