= List of cities in Sardinia =

Sardinian towns

This is a list of selected cities in Sardinia with local names.

== Metropolitan areas ==
- Cagliari, (population about 450,000)

Including Quartu Sant'Elena, Selargius, Assemini, Capoterra, Monserrato, Sestu, Sinnai, Quartucciu, Maracalagonis and Elmas.

== Provincial administrative capitals ==
- Cagliari, Casteddu (population about 160,000)
- Carbonia
- Nuoro, Nùgoro
- Oristano, Aristanis
- Sassari (population about 130,000)

== Other towns and villages ==
- Alghero, L'Alguer
- Arzachena, Alzachena
- Bitti, Vithi
- Bonorva, Bonòlva
- Bosa
- Castelsardo, Caltheddu
- Cuglieri, Culiri
- Dorgali, Durgali
- Flumini Maggiore, Frùmini Majori
- Gavoi, Gaboi
- Guspini, Gùspini
- Iglesias, Igrèsias
- La Maddalena, Madalena
- Lanusei, Lanusèi
- Macomer, Macumere
- Mogoro, Mogoru
- Mamoiada, Mamujada
- Olbia, Terranòa/Tarranòa
- Oliena, Uliana
- Orune, Orùne
- Ozieri, Othieri
- Perfugas, Peifugas
- Ploaghe, Piaghe
- Porto Torres, Posthudorra
- Posada, Pasada
- Pozzomaggiore, Puthumajore
- Pula
- Quartu Sant'Elena, Quartu Sant'Aleni
- San Teodoro, Santu Diadoru
- Sanluri, Seddori
- Sant'Antioco, Sant'Antiogu
- Santa Teresa Gallura, Lungoni
- Selargius, Cedraxius
- Siniscola, Thiniscole
- Tempio Pausania, Tèmpiu
- Terralba, Tarraba
- Teulada
- Tortolì, Tortuelie
- Urzulei, Orthullè
- Villaputzu, Biddeputzi
- Villacidro, Biddexidru

== See also ==
- Sardinia
- Tourist destinations of Sardinia
- Sardinian Archaeological and artistic sites
