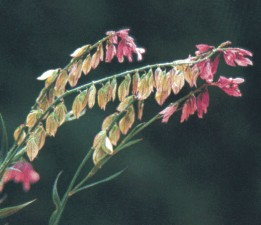

Conservation status
- Critically Endangered (IUCN 3.1)

Scientific classification
- Kingdom: Plantae
- Clade: Embryophytes
- Clade: Tracheophytes
- Clade: Spermatophytes
- Clade: Angiosperms
- Clade: Eudicots
- Clade: Rosids
- Order: Fabales
- Family: Polygalaceae
- Genus: Polygala
- Species: P. sinisica

Binomial name
- Polygala sinisica Arrigoni

= Polygala sinisica =

Species of flowering plant

Polygala sinisica is a species of plant in the family Polygalaceae. It is endemic to the island of Sardinia in Italy.

== Distribution ==
Polygala sinisica occurs only in Sardinia, along the coast at Capo Mannu just north of Tharros in the Sinis peninsula region.

Its natural habitats are in Mediterranean shrubby vegetation and rocky areas.

It is an IUCN Red List Critically Endangered plant species and IUCN Top 50 Campaign Mediterranean Island Plants, threatened by habitat loss.
