= Costa Smeralda =

Coastal area in Sardinia, Italy

Coordinates: 41.1°N 9.5°E

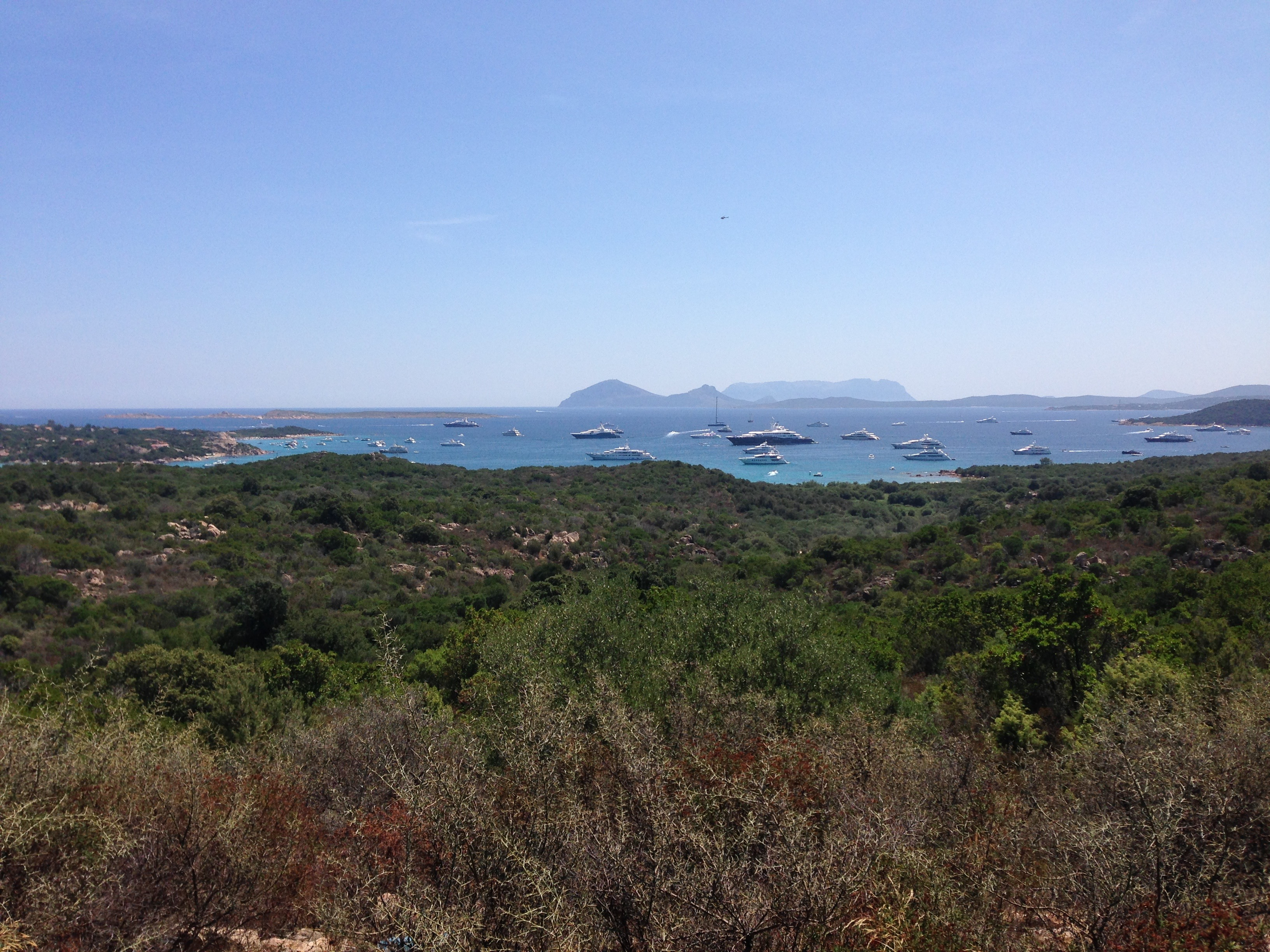
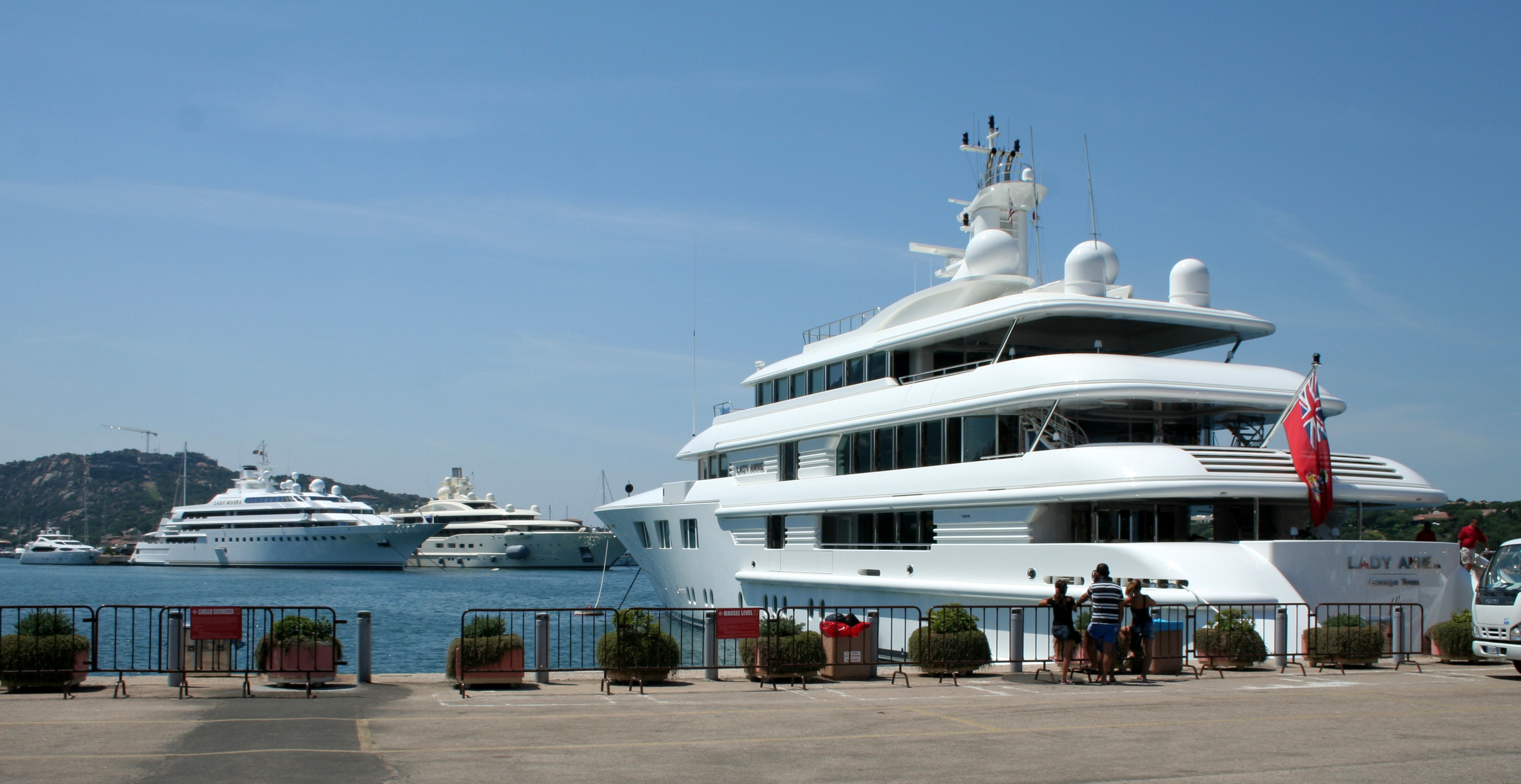
- Costa Smeralda images
- Interactive map of Costa Smeralda
- Country: Italy
- Regione: Sardinia

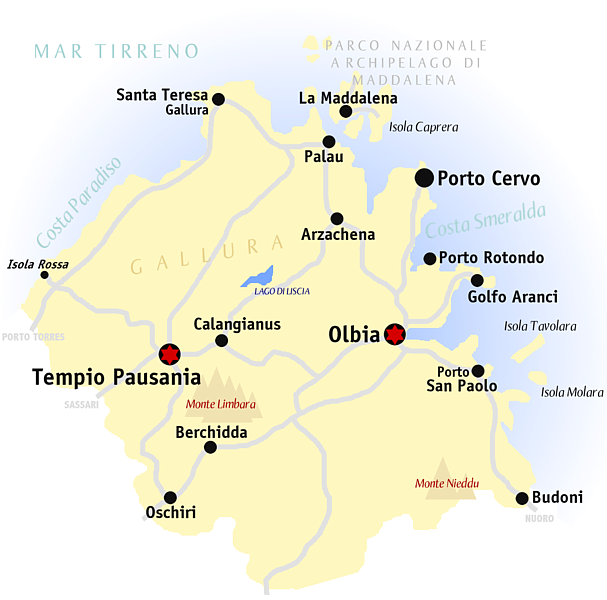
A regional map of Gallura with the location of the Costa Smeralda

Sardegna's Costa Smeralda Drone Views

The Costa Smeralda (Italian: [ˈkɔsta zmeˈralda], lit. 'Emerald Coast'; Gallurese: Monti di Mola; Sardinian: Montes de Mola) is a coastal area and tourist destination in northern Sardinia, Italy, with a length of some 20 km, although the term originally designated only a small stretch in the commune of Arzachena.

With white sand beaches, golf clubs, private jet and helicopter services, and exclusive hotels, the area has drawn celebrities, business and political leaders, and other affluent visitors.

Costa Smeralda is one of the most expensive locations in Europe. Prime home prices in the area increased by 18% in 2023, while prime rents were double their pre-Covid levels. On a per square metre basis, prime residential prices in Sardinia reached nearly €12,500.

The main towns and villages in the area, built according to a detailed urban plan, are Porto Cervo, Liscia di Vacca, Baja Sardinia, Capriccioli, and Romazzino. Archaeological sites include the necropolis of Li Muri.

Each September the Sardinia Cup sailing regatta is held off the coast. Polo matches are held between April and October at Gershan near Arzachena.

Development of the area started in 1961, and was financed by a consortium of companies led by Prince Karim Aga Khan. Spiaggia del Principe, one of the beaches along the Costa Smeralda, was named after this Ishmaelite prince. Architects involved in the project included Michele Busiri Vici, Jacques Couëlle, Savin Couëlle, and Vietti.

== See also ==
- Tourist destinations of Sardinia
