= San Giovanni di Posada =

Village in Sardinia, Italy

Coordinates: 40.61798°N 9.74737°E

San Giovanni di Posada (Latin: Portus Luguidonis or Portus Liquidonis) is a frazione and small village in Sardinia, Italy, on the Tyrrhenian coast of the island, in the territory of the comune of Posada.

Formerly known as Marina di Posada, it underwent rebuilding in the 1970s as an residential village for tourism.

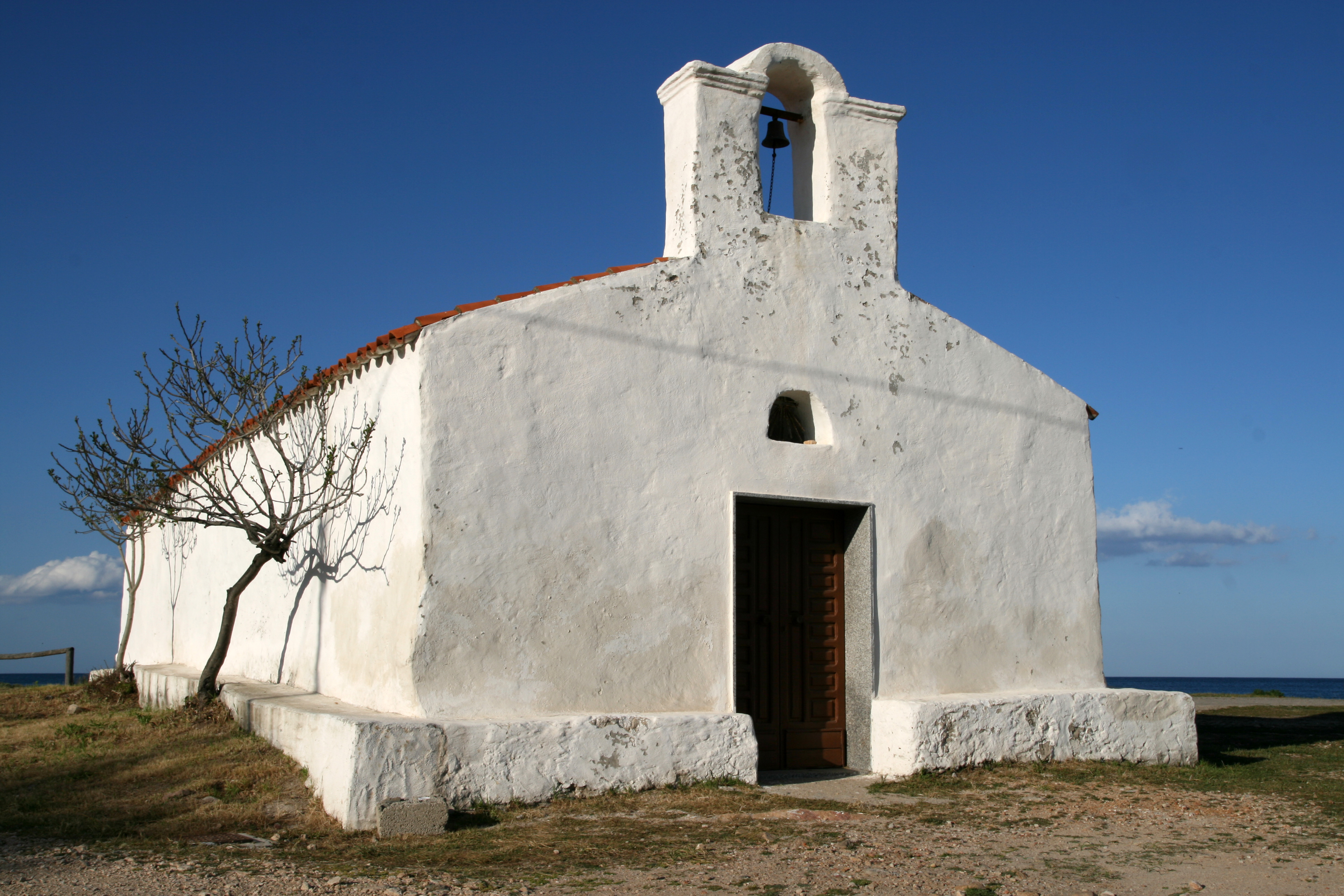
The small Church dedicated to Saint John (San Giovanni), right on the beach

Its history goes back to the Roman harbour (named "Portus Luguidonis" - presumably located in the little bay in front of the ancient church of St. John), from where the Romans entered inner Sardinia. Through this harbour passed all the goods to or from Rome, but all the cargo was carried by small and light ships directed to Olbia (some 50km north), where bigger ships would have trafficked with Ostia. Traffic was supposedly intense, Sardinia bearing the sobriquet "the granary of Rome".

In the immediate surroundings, it is supposed there was a temple in honour of Feronia, an Etruscan deity, goddess of the waters; this would prove the presence of Etruscans in this area at the time of Nuragici people. A similar cult of Feronia is reported on the Italian mainland at least in two places: in Fiano Romano (near Rome), and in Terracina, some 120km south of Rome.

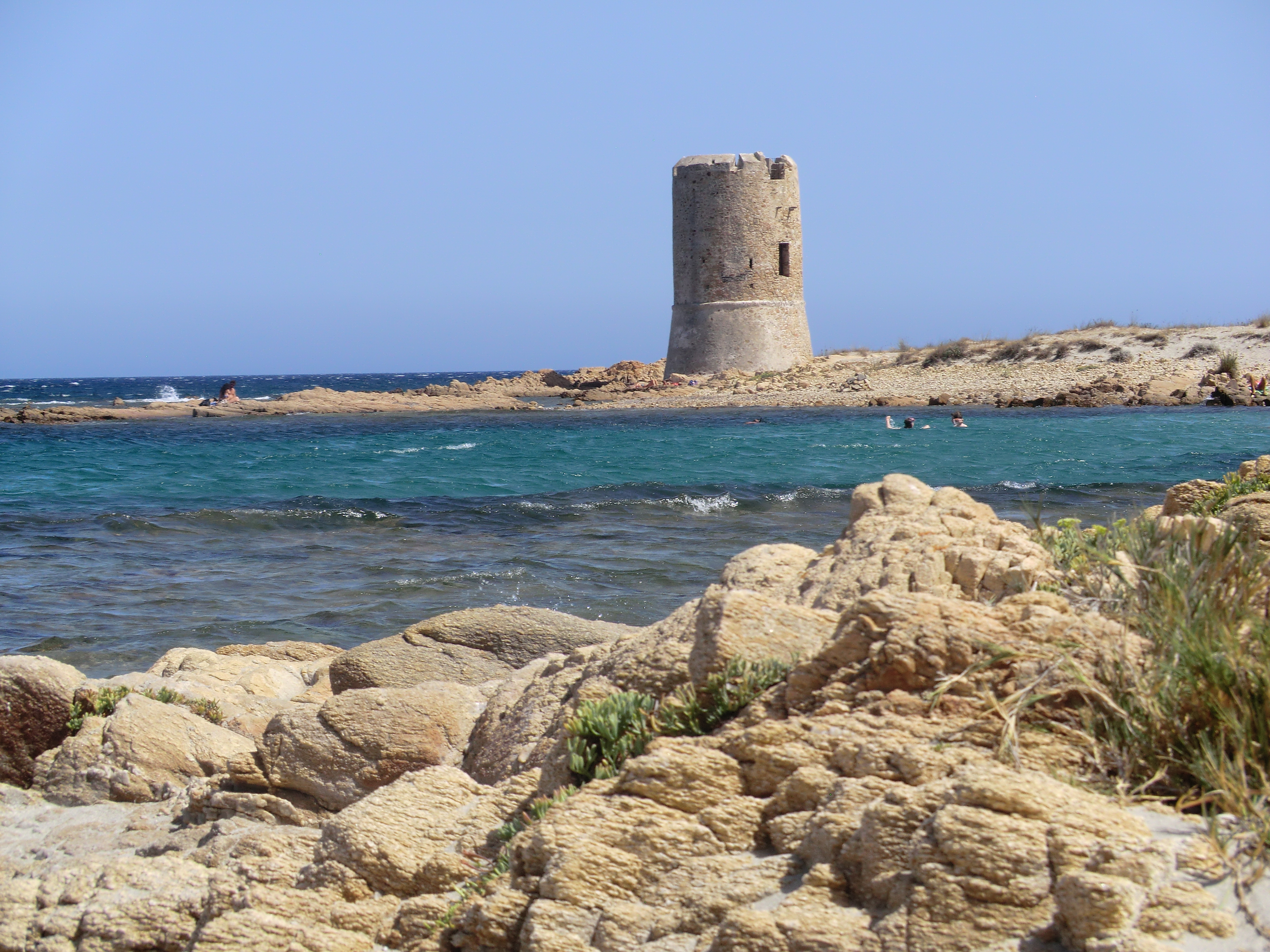
Spanish coastal tower near the beach

It is one of the main tourist destinations of Sardinia, has a long beach (more than 15km of white sand) and a system of rivers of biological importance. A part of this territory is going to be formally protected in the near future with the creation of a nature park (Parco Fluviale).
