= Feronia (Sardinia) =

Mysterious ancient site in Sardinia

Feronia (Ancient Greek: Φερωνία) is the name of a mysterious ancient site (now disappeared) near the town of Posada (Sardinia, Italy), which was in Ptolemy's maps and following until the Middle Ages.

It is supposed that, due to the peculiar character and history of the territory, the place was named after the Roman (or Etruscan) goddess.

Due to a few archaeological findings, recent studies tend to identify the site (and an eventual sacred area) in the Posada suburb of Santa Caterina, but a relevant group of opponents prefer to consider it was near the Portus Luguidonis (a Roman harbour), at San Giovanni di Posada. This second theory is also based on the fact that a port would have had a reason for being included in a nautical map, while a simple sacred area (and Sardinia has really many of them) would have not been so important for the sailors of that age.
