= Porto Pollo =

Porto Pollo (also known as Porto Puddu in Sardinian and Poltu Pullu in Gallurese) is an Italian località, in the comune of Palau, on the northern Sardinian coast in the Province of Sassari.

== Geography ==
Porto Pollo is located approximately 7 km from Palau and 50 km from Olbia, between the mouth of the Liscia river and the Isola dei Gabbiani (Isuledda), a small peninsula connected to the mainland by a narrow sandy isthmus. The area is characterised by white sand dunes up to 23 metres high, crystal-clear turquoise waters and Mediterranean scrubland.

== Wind and water sports ==
Porto Pollo is internationally renowned as one of Europe's premier destinations for windsurfing, kitesurfing and wingfoiling. The consistent Maestrale wind from the northwest blows reliably between 15 and 30 knots, typically from midday to early evening, from April to November.

American windsurfing champion Robby Naish described Porto Pollo as "a perfect natural gymnasium". In 2016, Porto Pollo hosted the IKA Kiteboarding World Championship finals.

The area hosts several internationally recognised water sports centres including MB Pro Center (founded 2009, one of Europe's largest windsurf centres with 250+ boards) and Sporting Club Sardinia (founded 1988, affiliated with the Italian Sailing Federation).

== Beaches ==
The locality features several distinct beaches:

- Porto Pollo beach – 3 km long, exposed to wind, ideal for water sports
- Padula Piatta – calm waters, suitable for families
- Angolo Azzurro (Blue Corner) – granite rocks, crystal-clear water
- Punta Sardegna – wild beach with spectacular sunsets
- Spiaggia delle Dune – natural dunes, unspoiled nature

== La Maddalena archipelago ==
Porto Pollo serves as a departure point for excursions to the La Maddalena Archipelago National Park, reachable in approximately 15 minutes by boat. Key destinations include the islands of Spargi, Budelli (famous for its Pink Beach), Santa Maria and Caprera.
