= Muravera =

Muravera Murera
- Comune
- Comune di Muravera
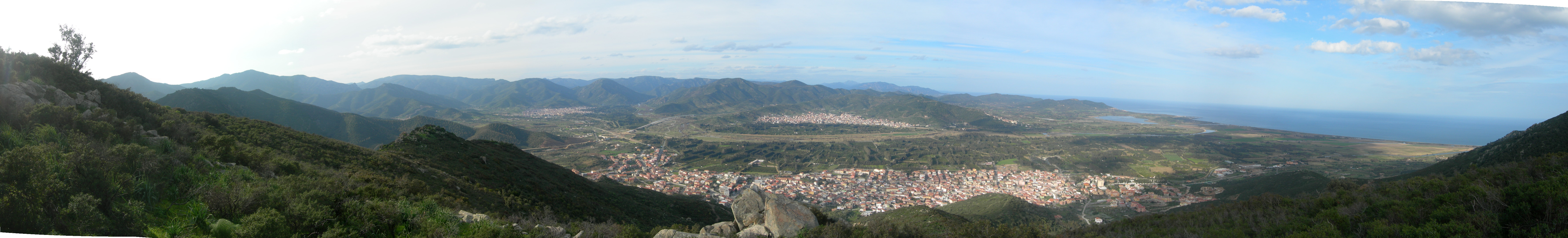

- Coat of arms

- Location within Sardinia
- Coordinates: 39°25′N 9°34′E
- Country: Italy
- Region: Sardinia
- Metropolitan city: Cagliari (CA)
- Frazioni: Capo Ferrato, Costa Rei, Feraxi

Government
  - Mayor: Marco Sebastiano Falchi

Area
  - Total: 94.7 km^{2} (36.6 sq mi)
- Elevation: 9 m (30 ft)

Population (1 January 2008)
  - Total: 5,155
  - Density: 54.4/km^{2} (141/sq mi)
- Demonym: Muraveresi
- Time zone: UTC+1 (CET)
  - Summer (DST): UTC+2 (CEST)
- Postal code: 09043
- Dialing code: 070
- Website: Official website

Muravera (Sardinian: Murera, Latin: Sarcapos) is a comune (municipality) in the Metropolitan City of Cagliari in the Italian region Sardinia, about 45 kilometres (28 mi) northeast of Cagliari in the Sarrabus.

It is a centre of citrus production as well as a tourist resort, including several fine beaches such as that of Costa Rei.

== Climate ==
Climate data for Muravera (1981-2010)
Month	Jan	Feb	Mar	Apr	May	Jun	Jul	Aug	Sep	Oct	Nov	Dec	Year
Mean daily maximum °C (°F)	14.8 (58.6)	15.4 (59.7)	18.0 (64.4)	20.7 (69.3)	25.4 (77.7)	30.8 (87.4)	34.2 (93.6)	33.9 (93.0)	29.3 (84.7)	25.1 (77.2)	19.4 (66.9)	15.8 (60.4)	23.6 (74.5)
Mean daily minimum °C (°F)	6.1 (43.0)	6.0 (42.8)	7.5 (45.5)	9.5 (49.1)	12.9 (55.2)	16.8 (62.2)	19.9 (67.8)	20.2 (68.4)	17.3 (63.1)	14.2 (57.6)	10.1 (50.2)	7.4 (45.3)	12.3 (54.1)
Average precipitation mm (inches)	57.5 (2.26)	53.7 (2.11)	52.4 (2.06)	59.3 (2.33)	26.2 (1.03)	9.6 (0.38)	7.3 (0.29)	12.1 (0.48)	66.6 (2.62)	82.4 (3.24)	110.6 (4.35)	88.5 (3.48)	626.0 (24.65)
Source: Climatologia della Sardegna per il trentennio 1981-2010
