= L'Isuledda =

Peninsula in northern Sardinia, Italy

Isuledda
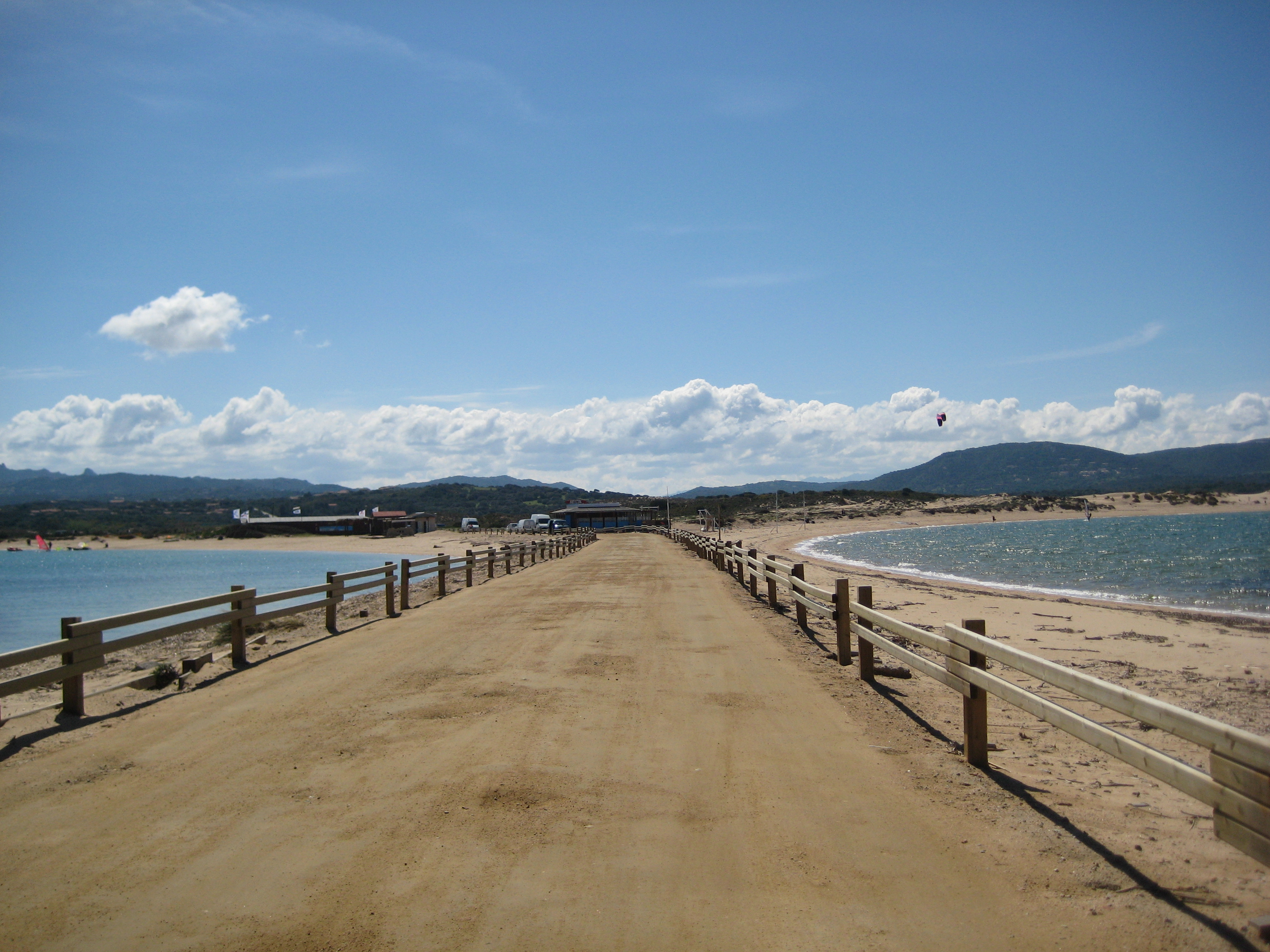
- The isthmus connecting Isola dei Gabbiani to mainland Sardinia
- Interactive map of Isuledda

Geography
- Location: Sardinia, Italy
- Coordinates: 41°11′44″N 9°19′07″E
- Area: 0.18 km^{2} (0.069 sq mi)

Administration
- Italy

The Isuledda (Sardinian for Little Island), also called Isola dei Gabbiani (Italian for Island of Seagulls), is an almost-island in northern Sardinia, Italy, facing the Sardinian channel. Covering an area of approximately 180,000 m^{2}, it is almost completely surrounded by the sea, and connected to the mainland by a narrow isthmus of sandy terrain, hence, despite the name, it is in fact a peninsula. It is situated close to the località of Porto Pollo and Barrabisa.

The name "Isola dei Gabbiani" comes from the name of the camping that occupied the whole surface up to 2008. The area is administered by the comune of Palau. Due to its windy climate, it is a common destination for windsurfers and kitesurfers. The place is particularly favorable to the practice of these sports thanks to the optimal exposition to winds from north-west, which are dominant in the Mediterranean Sea (especially mistral).

We got there in a wonderful spot, in a day with more than 40 knots of mistral. In front of us two big bays; the crystalline and turquoise water and the possibility to choose whether to sail on a one metre high chop or on flat water as in a salt lake. All that in complete safety, with sandy depth and the coast line within a mile all around: a perfect natural gym!

== Geography ==
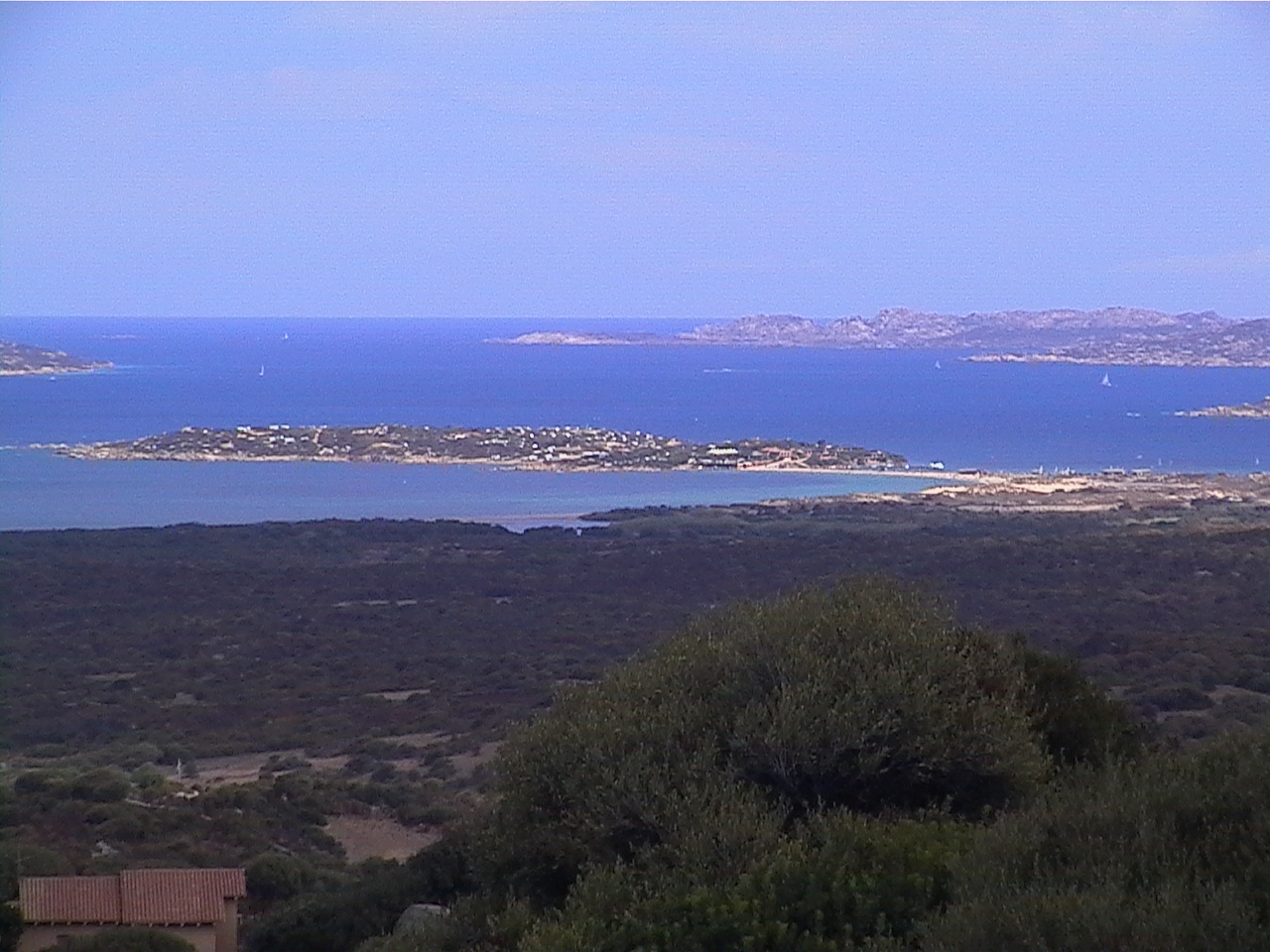
Isola dei Gabbiani as seen from San Pasquale.

The peninsula divides two wide bays: baia di ponente and baia di levante (western and eastern bay respectively). With respect to the mistral, the western bay is upwind of the isthmus, and is characterised by "choppy" water surface. On the other side, the eastern bay is downwind of the isthmus, close to Porto Pollo, and its flat water condition makes it favoured by freestyle windsurfers.

On both sides the water is clear and the depth is sandy.
