= Maristela =

Maristela or Maristella is a feminine given name and a surname common in Spanish and Portuguese speaking countries. It may refer to the following people:

Given name

- Maristela Salvatori (born 1960), Brazilian artist and printmaker
- Maristella Agosti (born 1950), Italian researcher and professor
- Maristella Lorch, American critic of Italian literature
- Maristella Svampa (born 1961), Argentine sociologist

Surname

- Jose Concepcion Maristela Sr. (1916–1979), Filipino military officer
- Trixie Maristela (born 1980), Filipino transgender woman, LGBT rights advocate, actress and beauty queen

== See also ==
- Marestella Torres-Sunang (born 1981), Filipina long jumper
- Mariastella Gelmini (born 1973), Italian politician and attorney
