= Liscia di Vacca =

Bay in Sardinia, Italy

Coordinates: 40°08′03.7″N 9°31′04.1″E

Liscia di Vacca is a bay, located a couple miles northwest of the seaside resort of Porto Cervo, on the Costa Smeralda in the northwest of the island of Sardinia, Italy.

In the local language, its name means "beach of the cows," because it is where the shepherds used to bring their flocks to pasture. It is now a well-known residential site, famous for huge villas, where Italian and international wealthy people spend their summer vacations.
