= Costa Rei =

Frazione in Sardinia

Coordinates: 39°15′7″N 9°34′26″E

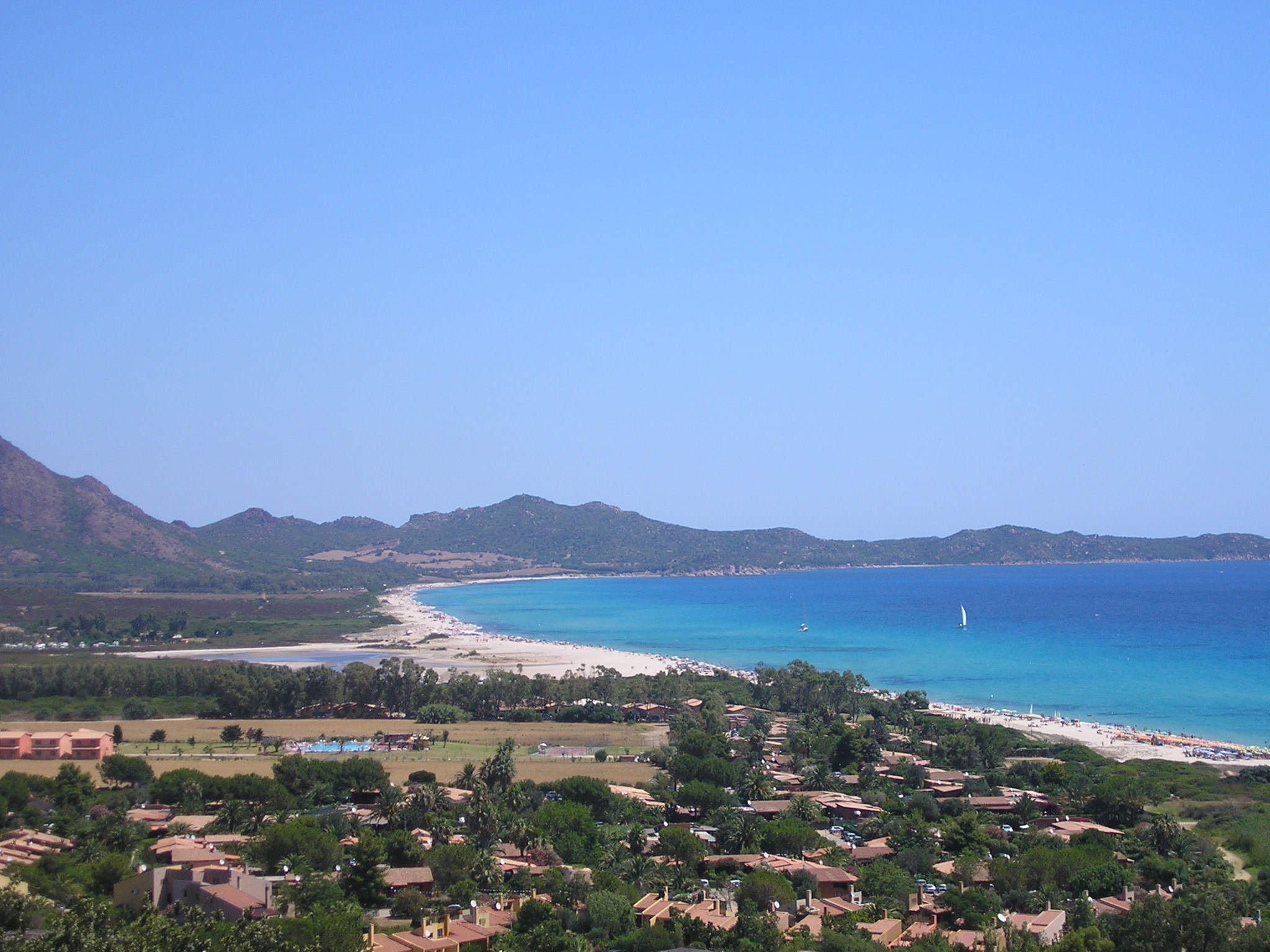
Sea view in Costa Rei.

Costa Rei is a frazione of the comune of Muravera in southern Sardinia.

It features a 12 km long beach.

== Economy ==
Costa Rei is a popular destination for tourists, most of which are from Germany or Italy.

It has a church and many stores selling Sardinian arts and crafts. Night time attractions include the mini-golf course at Sant' Elmo beach, nightclubs, and open-air movie theatres.
