= Capo Mannu =

Promontory in Sardinia, Italy

Coordinates: 40°2′6.72″N 8°22′40.48″E

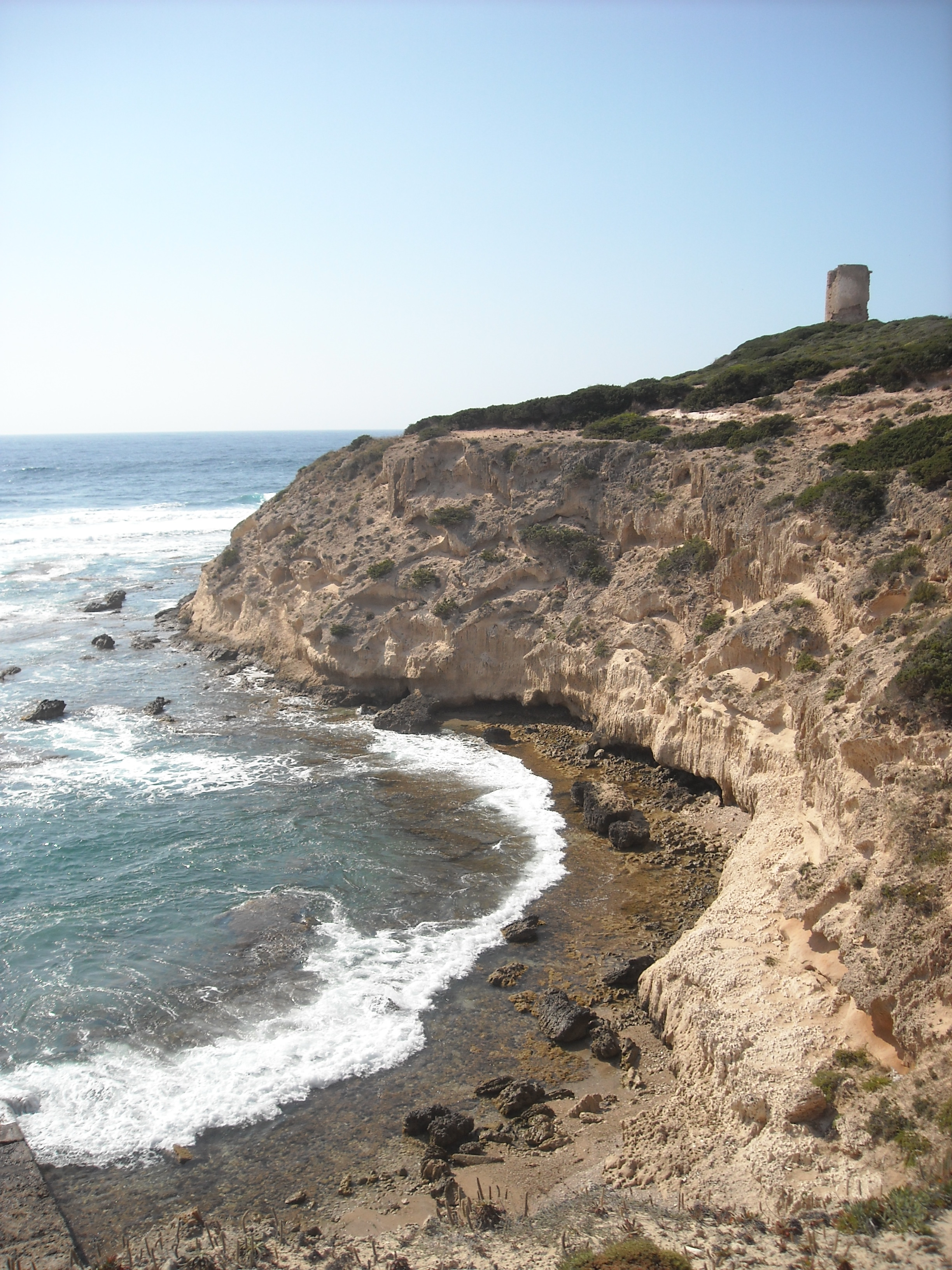
View of the southern cliff of Capo Mannu and of the Aragonese tower.

Capo Mannu is a promontory in Sardinia, Italy situated in the territory of the Comune of San Vero Milis, in the Province of Oristano, approximately 22 km north of Oristano. It is the northern tip of the Sinis peninsula and is part of the Marine Protected Area Sinis Peninsula and the island of Mal di Ventre.

== Sport ==
Capo Mannu is renowned attraction for surfers, windsurfers and kiters, both nationally and internationally. The mistral, the dominant wind of the area, gives rise to waves up to 4–5 metres high. Every year, several surfing, windsurfing and kiteboarding competitions take place in the area, the most well known probably being the Capo del Capo (Chief of the Cape) windsurfing and kitesurfing competition.
