= Baja Sardinia =

Frazione of Arzachena, Italy

Coordinates: 41.1401°N 9.4783°E

- Frazione
- View of Baja Sardinia
- Interactive map of Baja Sardinia
- Country: Italy
- Region: Sardinia
- Comune: Arzachena

Population
  - Total: 183

Baja Sardinia is a frazione of the comune of Arzachena, in Northern Sardinia, Italy. Located opposite of the Island of Caprera, Baja Sardinia faces the Gulf of Arzachena and is on the Costa Smeralda. It is roughly 4km from Porto Cervo. Developed in the 1960s, the town is now known for attracting Italian and international celebrities during the summer period. It has a permanent population of 183.

== History ==
Baja Sardinia in 1986

The area now occupied by Baja Sardinia was originally known as Cala Battistoni. The modern settlement developed during the early 1960s as tourism expanded along the northeastern coast of Sardinia. In 1961, the Bolognese entrepreneur Domenico Gentili purchased approximately 90 hectares of land around Cala Battistoni with the intention of developing a tourist resort. The first major establishment was the restaurant and dancing venue Il Pappagallo, which opened on 14 July 1962. Early accommodation consisted partly of wooden structures, followed by the construction of villas and hotels. The development of Baja Sardinia took place at approximately the same time as the emergence of the Costa Smeralda as an international tourist destination. During the 1970s and 1980s, further villas, apartments and commercial buildings were constructed, including the central square known as Piazzetta Due Vele, and the Church of Sant’Antonio da Padova. Baja Sardinia developed primarily as a seaside resort. Its central beach, Cala Battistoni, is located below the centre of the settlement. The settlement is known for its proximity to the La Maddalena Archipelago, Caprera and the Costa Smeralda.

== Monuments ==
=== Religious architecture ===
The Church of Sant'Antonio da Padova

- The Church of Sant’Antonio di Padova: The church of Sant’Antonio di Padova is located in Piazza dei Pini and serves the local Catholic community. Built during the second half of the 1980s, the church was constructed and primarily funded by Padre Giacomino Canu, a local priest. It is the only church in Baja Sardinia.

=== Civil Architecture ===
Piazzetta Due Vele

- Forte Cappellini: The fort is a former coastal military installation located on the promontory of Capo Tre Monti. The original fortification was constructed by the Piedmontese army at the end of the 18th century and was subsequently incorporated into the coastal defence system of northern Sardinia. The complex was later expanded with additional military structures and was used during the 19th and 20th centuries.
- Piazzetta Due Vele: The central square of Baja Sardinia contains a sculpture representing two sails, created by Lucifero Sgarbati, also known as Domenico Gentili. The sculpture was donated to the community by the founders of the tourist settlement and has become one of the symbols of Baja Sardinia.
