= Solinas =

Solinas is an Italian surname. Notable people with the surname include:

- Franco Solinas (1927–1982), Italian writer and screenwriter
- Giovanni Solinas (born 1968), Italian football manager
- Marisa Solinas (1939–2019), Italian actress and singer

== See also ==
- Solinas prime, a class of prime number, named after Jerome Solinas
