= Capo Malfatano =

Headland in Sardinia, Italy

- Cape
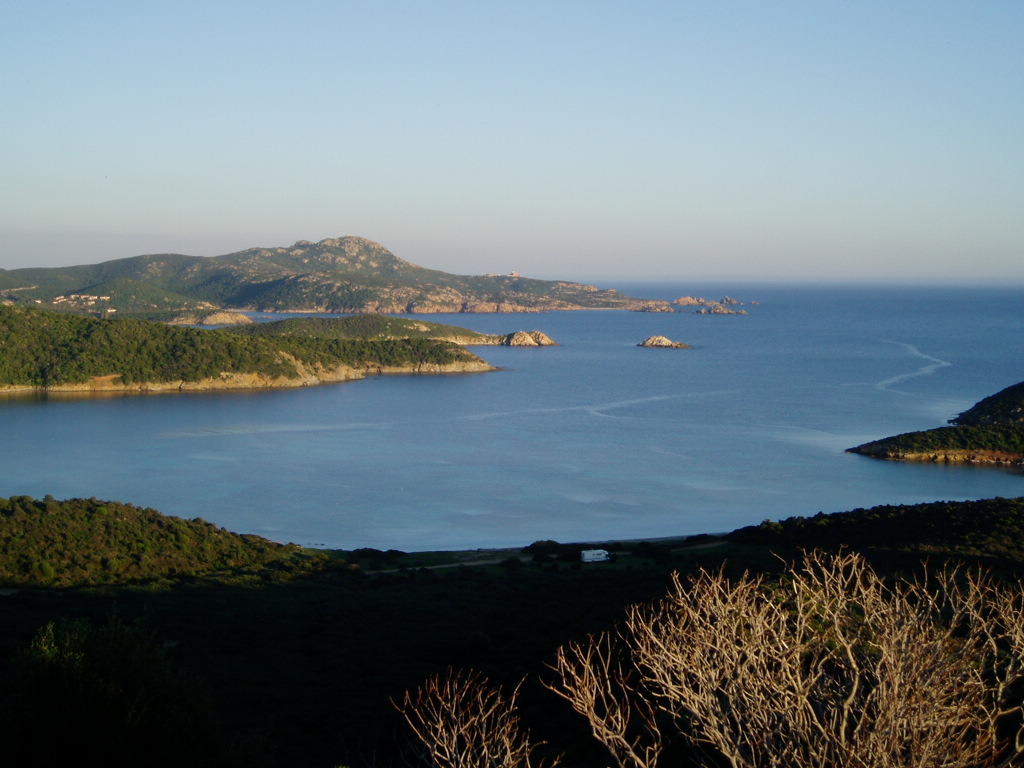
- The bay of Capo Malfatano.

- Location within Sardinia
- Coordinates: 38°53′02″N 8°48′06″E
- Location: Sardinia, Italy

Capo Malfatano is a cape located in southern Sardinia, Italy, in the municipality of Teulada.

== History ==
The presence of prehistoric settlements on the area of Capo Malfatano indicates that its bay was inhabited since the middle Bronze Age by the Nuragic civilization, and was used as a natural harbor for trade.

Later a Punic military outpost, the harbor was expanded between the V and III century B.C., with the creation of two submerged walls acting as a breakwater. The bulwarks were built with regular shaped blocks of sandstone from the nearby quarries of Piscinnì. This is the only remaining structure of this type in Sardinia. Several artifacts from the Roman republican and imperial era have been retrieved in various sites on the cape.

== Geography and natural environment ==
The area surrounding Cape Malfatano can be described as a ria coast, with coastal inlets formed by the partial submergence of an ancient river valley. The coast is mostly rocky and steep with a few sandy beaches of modest dimensions.

A 2004 investigation catalogued the flora of the cape, consisting of 255 different indigenous species, including a variety of daisies, grasses and legumes.

== Capo Malfatano Tower ==
A tower is located on the tip of the promontory, accessible only by foot. Built in 1578 under the Spanish Empire, the Capo Malfatano Tower (Italian: Torre di Capo Malfatano) was originally part of a trading post used for exchanges with merchants from Amalfi. Meant as a watchtower, it was commanded by an alcaide and equipped with cannons, muskets and rifles.

An attack to the tower was recorded in 1764 from an army of 400 and was successfully repealed. In 1812, following another attack, the garrison guarding the tower was increased to five soldiers and a corporal. The tower was in use at least until 1847.

Similar to other watchtowers on the island, it has a truncated conical shape. It is 15 m tall and measures 4.5 m in diameter; it contains an internal room with a fireplace, accessible from an opening located 6 m above ground. A staircase, carved in the wall, leads to the top of the tower.

== The controversial tourist resort ==
The project for the construction of a resort on Cape Malfatano attracted significant media attention in the 2010s because of its possible environmental impact. Sitas, a company whose shareholders included the Benetton Group, Toti Group, and Sansedoni, started construction of Capo Malfatano Resort, a touristic development project 190'000 cubic meters in size and comprising 518 rooms, on the natural area of the promontory. The project was presented to the public in 2010, after having been approved by the municipality of Teulada and by the regional council of Sardinia, who evaluated its environmental impact.

In 2011 the first opposition to the project came from Ovidio Marras, a Sardinian shepherd, 81 years old at the time.

A lawsuit questioning the legitimacy of the construction project as a whole was soon after started by the association Italia Nostra. In fact, the construction project was originally submitted for environmental evaluation in six separate parts, whose impact had been considered individually and not as a whole. The subdivision was deemed illegal by the regional administrative court of Sardinia in 2012. The Council of state, the supreme administrative court of Italy, upheld the sentence in 2014, thereby stopping construction permanently.
