= Posada, Sardinia =

Posada Pasada (Sardinian)
- Comune
- Comune di Posada
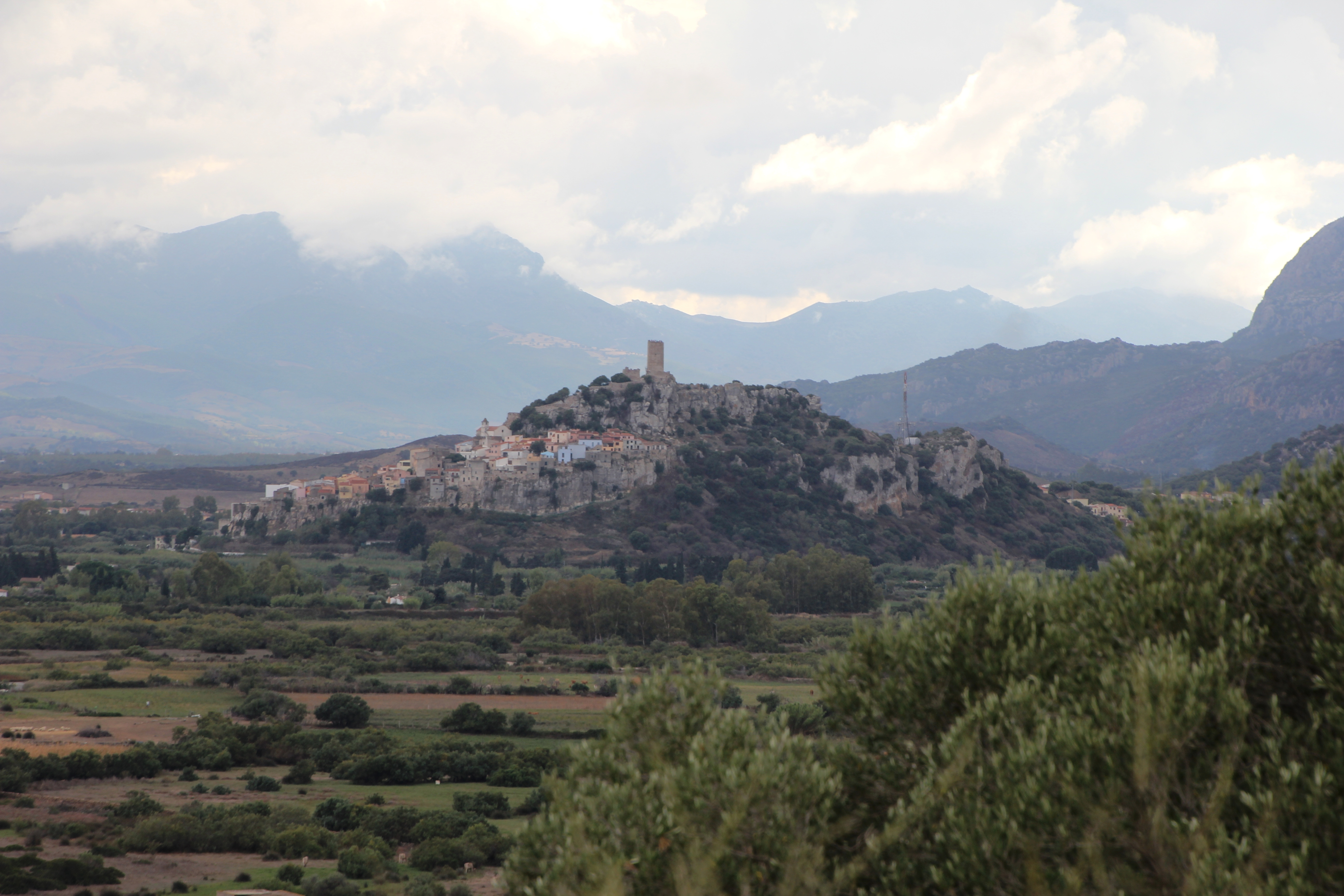
- View of Posada

- Location within Sardinia
- Coordinates: 40°38′N 9°43′E
- Country: Italy
- Region: Sardinia
- Province: Nuoro (NU)
- Frazioni: San Giovanni di Posada, Sas Murtas, Montelongu

Area
  - Total: 32.77 km^{2} (12.65 sq mi)
- Elevation: 37 m (121 ft)

Population (2026)
  - Total: 3,079
  - Density: 93.96/km^{2} (243.3/sq mi)
- Demonym: Posadini
- Time zone: UTC+1 (CET)
  - Summer (DST): UTC+2 (CEST)
- Postal code: 08020
- Dialing code: 0784

Posada (Sardinian: Pasada), also previously known as Feronia or Pausata, is a town and comune (municipality) in the Province of Nuoro in the autonomous island region of Sardinia in Italy. The town sits on the coast of the Tyrrhenian Sea. It has 3,079 inhabitants.

Posada borders the municipalities of Budoni, Siniscola and Torpè. It is one of I Borghi più belli d'Italia ("The most beautiful villages of Italy").

== History ==
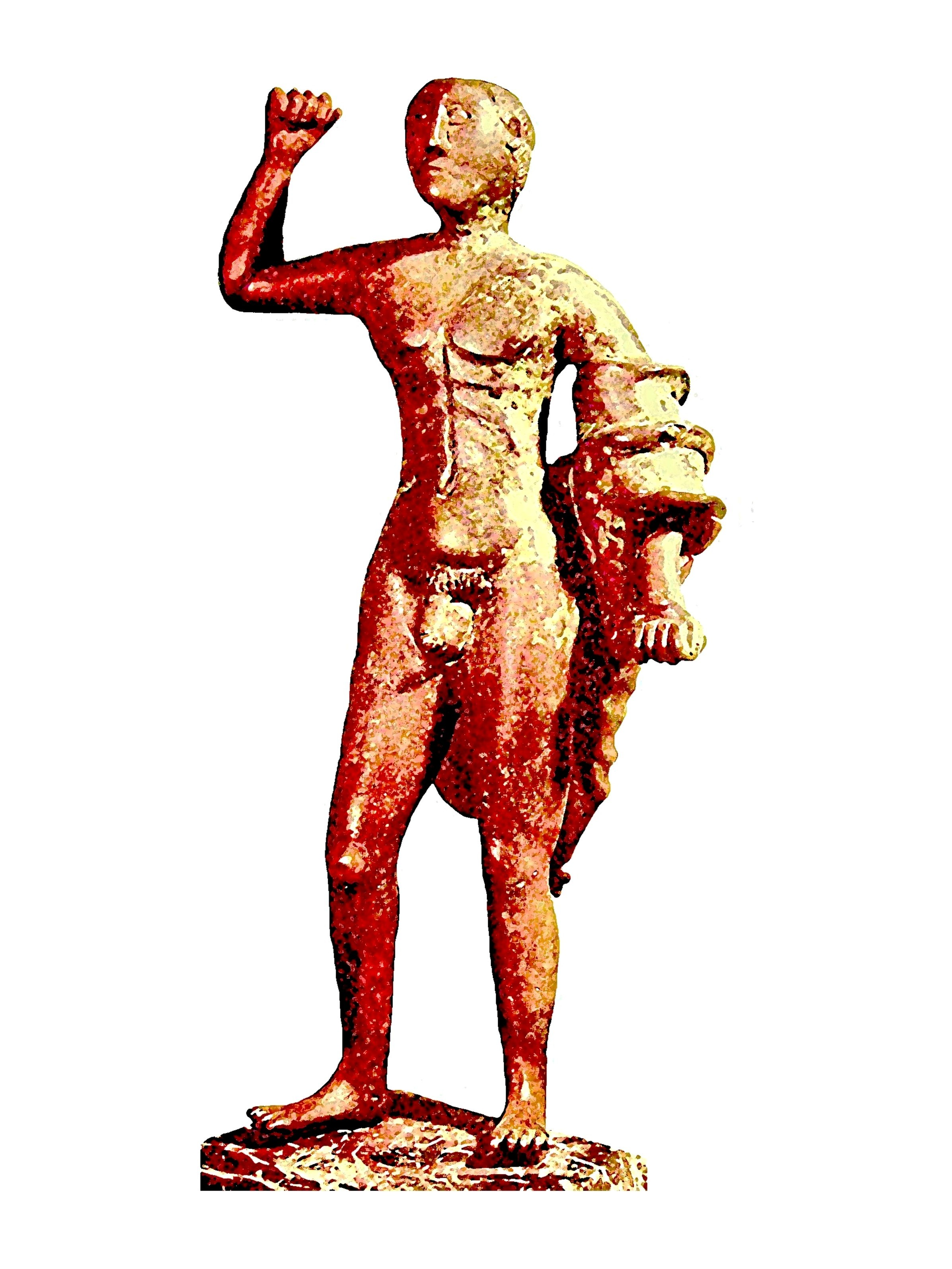
Statuette of Hercules from Posada.

Within Posada's territory was the ancient city of Feronia or Pheronia, the foundation of which is ascribed to the Faliscans, which contained a now lost temple to the Etruscan goddess Feronia.

During the Roman period, the town's importance declined with the foundation of nearby Portus Luguidonis.

In the Middle Ages, Posada was main town of an historical district called Baronia di Posada or Baronia Alta (to be distinguished from Baronia Bassa or Baronia di Orosei/Galtellì), on the Tyrrhenian coast of the island.

The ancient part of the town is in a spectacular position on the top of a hill, where it preserves a particular medieval historical center, with ruins of a castle (Castello della Fava) and a square panoramic tower of the 13th century.

The castle has been the equivalent of a holiday residence for the Giudichessa Eleanor of Arborea, and was object of alternate possession by the Giudicato d'Arborea and the Aragon, during the long fight before the Spanish conquest.

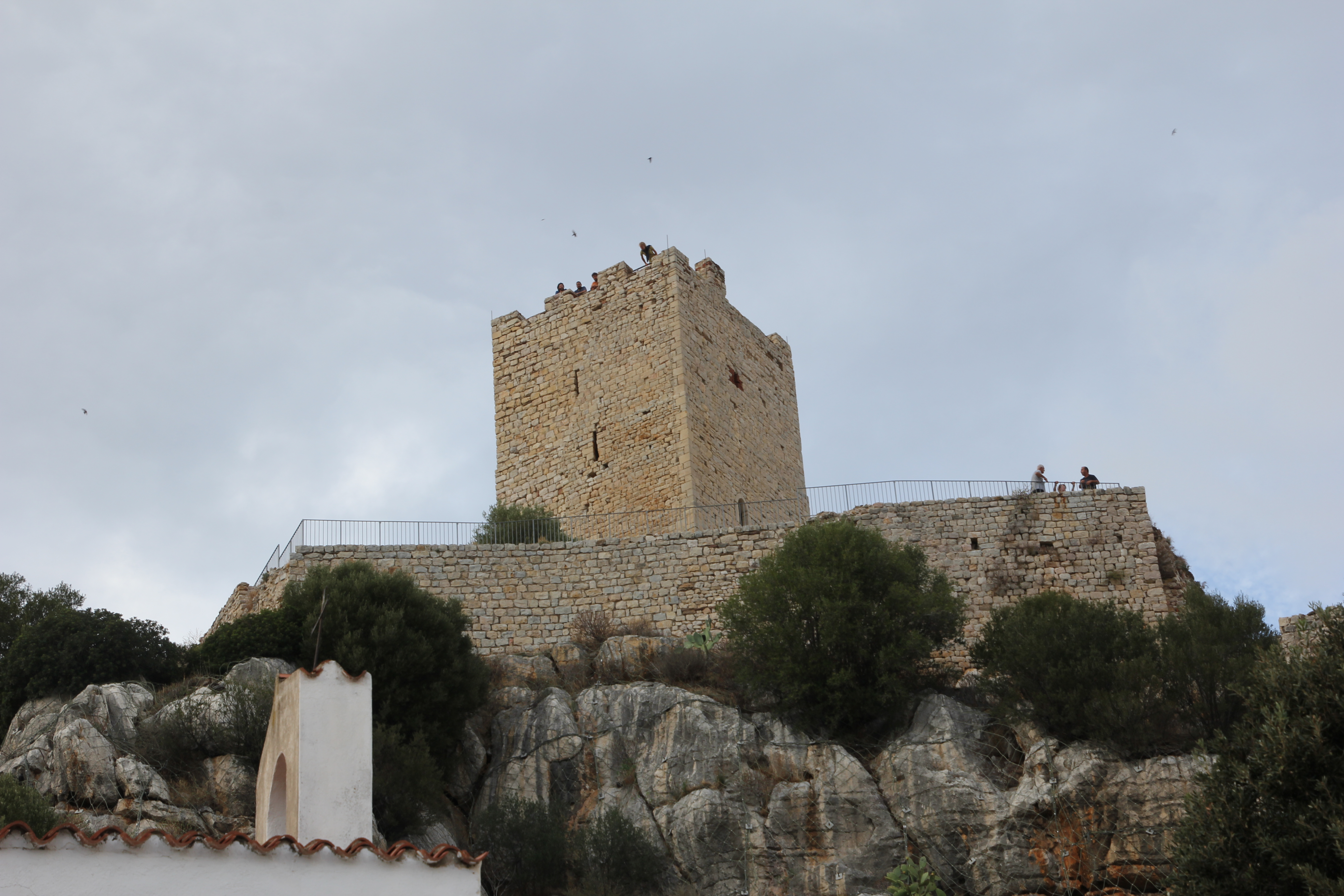
The castle

The castle became then the seat of the Baron of Posada, a title and a fief created in 1431 for Don Nicolò Carroz and formally ended in 1856, when it was finally bought by the kingdom of Sardinia (the last one of all Sardinian fiefs).

== Demographics ==
As of 2026, the population is 3,079, of which 50.7% are male, and 49.3% are female. Minors make up 13.7% of the population, and seniors make up 25.4%.

Historical population

Year	Pop.	±%
1861	403	—
1871	374	−7.2%
1881	435	+16.3%
1901	628	+44.4%
1911	740	+17.8%
1921	776	+4.9%
1931	851	+9.7%
1936	974	+14.5%

Year	Pop.	±%
1951	1,213	+24.5%
1961	1,265	+4.3%
1971	1,243	−1.7%
1981	1,646	+32.4%
1991	2,057	+25.0%
2001	2,394	+16.4%
2011	2,737	+14.3%
2021	3,020	+10.3%

Source: ISTAT

=== Immigration ===
As of 2025, immigrants make up 10.6% of the population. The 5 largest foreign countries of birth are Germany, Morocco, Romania, Belgium, and France.

== Economy ==
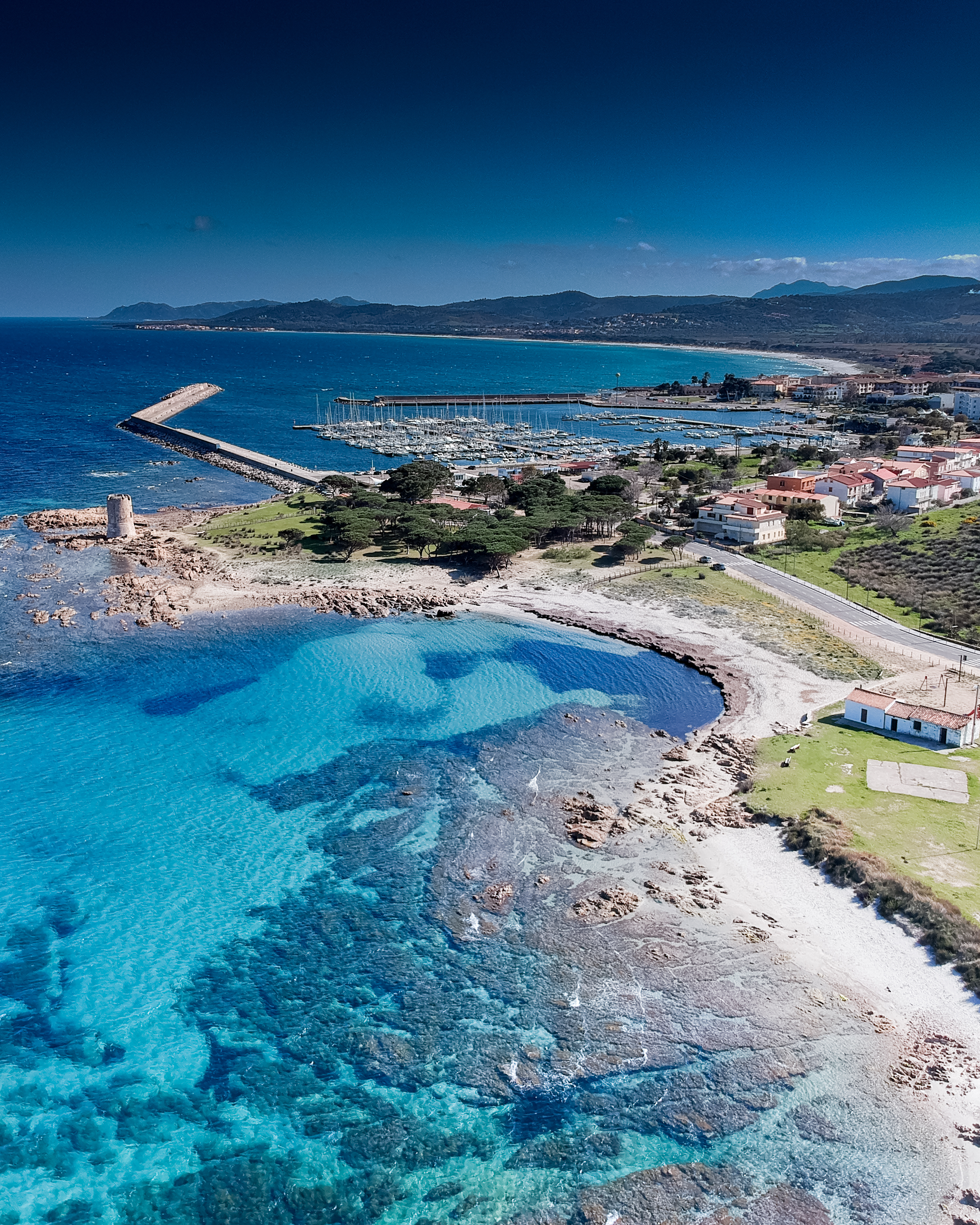
Tourist port

Tourism in Posada is the main economic activity.

The tourist port of La Caletta, co-managed with the municipality of Siniscola—with which Posada shares territorial jurisdiction—is currently being upgraded to implement facilities and services for recreational boaters
