= Mal di Ventre =

Island in Sardinia, Italy

Native name: Isula de Malu 'Entu
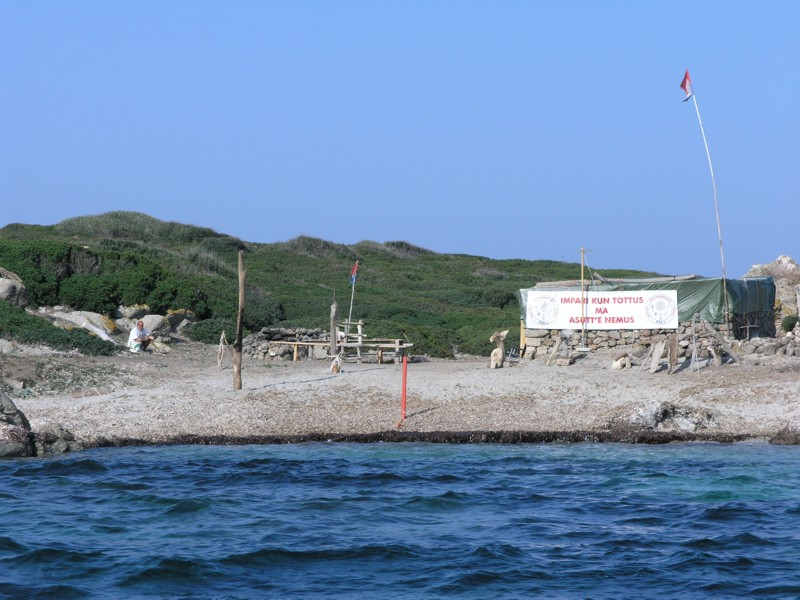
- Mal di Ventre

- Location within Sardinia Location within Italy

Geography
- Location: Mediterranean Sea
- Coordinates: 39°59′26″N 8°18′17″E
- Area: 81 ha (200 acres)
- Length: 2 km (1.2 mi)
- Width: 0.8 km (0.5 mi)
- Highest elevation: 18 m (59 ft)

Administration
- Italy
- Province: Oristano
- Municipality: Cabras

Demographics
- Population: 0

Additional information
- Official website: www.mnal.nd

Mal di Ventre (Sardinian: Malu 'Entu) is an island located off the coast of Sardinia. Mal di Ventre is notable for its Roman ruins and a Sardinian nationalist attempt at creating a micronation in 2008.

== Location and geography ==
Mal di Ventre is located in the Mediterranean Sea, 7 kilometres (4.3 mi) from Oristano in central-west Sardinia. The island is inside a marine protected area and its western coast is exposed to the Mistral, giving it a rugged topography as a result. There is a lighthouse at the island's highest point, 18 metres (59 ft) above sea level.

== History ==
The name of the island comes from the Savoyard cartographers, who mistranslated into Italian the Sardinian name Malu 'Entu ("bad winds") as Mal di Ventre ("stomach pain"). Ancient civilizations used to live on the island. The island was also inhabited during Roman times. The island contains ruins of Roman buildings, as well as the remnants of an ancient well. In 1898, the island became part of Parco del Sinis-Montiferru (Sinis-Montiferru institutional park).

Mal di Ventre was owned by the British entrepreneur John Miller, who had owned the island since 1972. In July 2014 the island was put up for sale, with an asking price of £100,000,000.

=== Republic of Malu Entu ===
In September 2008 a former truck driver named Salvatore "Doddore" Meloni and his followers seized Mal di Ventre and declared it to be an independent state as part of a broader and controversial effort to win the independence of Sardinia. Inspired by the independence movements of Kosovo, Abkhazia and South Ossetia, Meloni declared himself president of the Republic of Malu Entu and set up a presidential residence in a blue plastic tent. He declared the nation tax free and claimed that over 300 people had expressed an interest in moving there. The island was previously a meeting place for the Sardinian Independentist Party. Not long after he took over the island, Meloni sent drafts of his initiative to both the United Nations and Silvio Berlusconi, who was President of the Council of Ministers at the time.

In 2011, Meloni was charged with tax evasion to the sum of 5 million euros. In the summer of 2012 Meloni was convicted for his role in trying to take over the island and sentenced to 20 months in prison. In April 2017, Meloni was arrested and started a hunger strike in prison, asking to be considered a political prisoner. On July 5, 2017, after two months of hunger strike, he died.

== See also ==
- List of islands of Italy
