= Teulada, Sardinia =

Teulada Teulàda (Sardinian)
- Comune
- Comune di Teulada
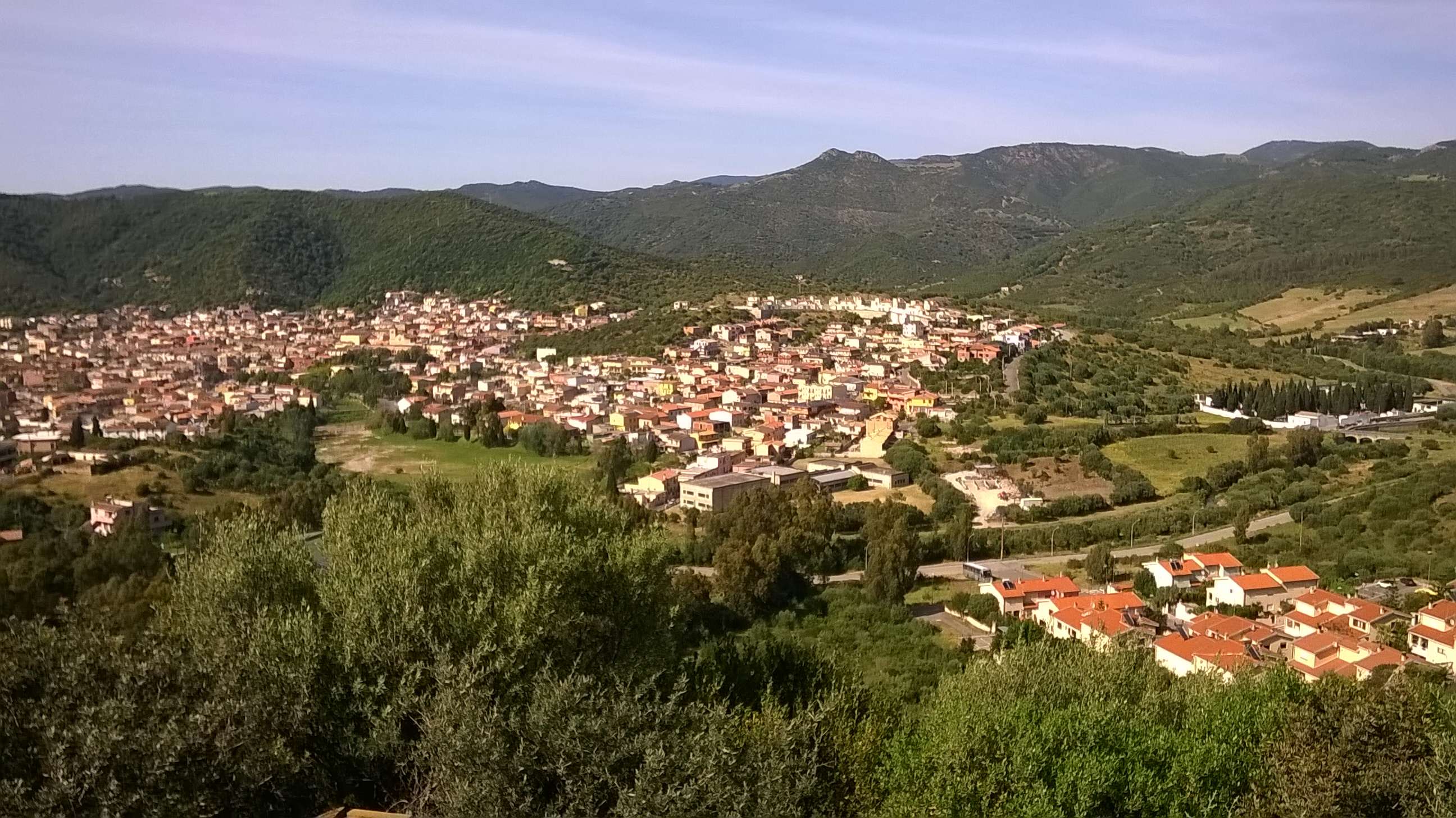
- View of Teulada

- Coat of arms

- Location within Sardinia
- Coordinates: 38°58′N 8°46′E
- Country: Italy
- Region: Sardinia
- Province: Sulcis Iglesiente
- Frazioni: Foxi, Genniomus, Gutturu Saidu, Is Carillus, Malfatano, Masoni de Monti, Masoni de Susu, Matteu, Perdaiola, Perdalonga, Sa Portedda, Su de Is Seis, Su Fonnesu

Government
  - Mayor: Angelo Milia

Area
  - Total: 246.19 km^{2} (95.05 sq mi)
- Elevation: 50 m (160 ft)

Population (2026)
  - Total: 3,156
  - Density: 12.82/km^{2} (33.20/sq mi)
- Demonym: Teuladini (in Italian) or teuladesi (in Sardinian)
- Time zone: UTC+1 (CET)
  - Summer (DST): UTC+2 (CEST)
- Postal code: 09019
- Dialing code: 070
- Website: www.comune.teulada.ca.it/

Teulada (Sardinian: Teulàda, Latin: Tegula) is a town and comune (municipality) in the Province of Sulcis Iglesiente in the autonomous island region of Sardinia in Italy, located about 40 kilometres (25 mi) southwest of Cagliari. It has 3,156 inhabitants.

Teulada borders the municipalities of Domus de Maria, Masainas, Piscinas, Pula, Sant'Anna Arresi, and Santadi.

== History ==
The locality of Sant'Isidoro di Teulada is one of the possible sites of the ancient Roman city of Bithia (also called Biotha and Biora).

In November 1940, during World War II, HMS Newcastle and three other British cruisers engaged and exchanged fire with a number of ships of the Italian navy, in a naval battle now known as the Battle of Cape Spartivento.

== Demographics ==
As of 2026, the population is 3,156, of which 51.7% are male, and 48.3% are female. Minors make up 8.5% of the population, and seniors make up 35.9%.

Historical population

Year	Pop.	±%
1861	3,184	—
1871	2,865	−10.0%
1881	3,026	+5.6%
1901	3,325	+9.9%
1911	3,808	+14.5%
1921	3,950	+3.7%
1931	4,701	+19.0%
1936	4,984	+6.0%

Year	Pop.	±%
1951	5,448	+9.3%
1961	5,742	+5.4%
1971	5,236	−8.8%
1981	5,090	−2.8%
1991	4,702	−7.6%
2001	3,988	−15.2%
2011	3,773	−5.4%
2021	3,300	−12.5%

Source: ISTAT

=== Immigration ===
As of 2025, immigrants make up 3.8% of the total population. The 5 largest foreign countries of birth are Germany, the United Kingdom, Romania, France, and Ukraine.

== Twin towns - sister cities ==
- Teulada, Spain

== Gallery ==
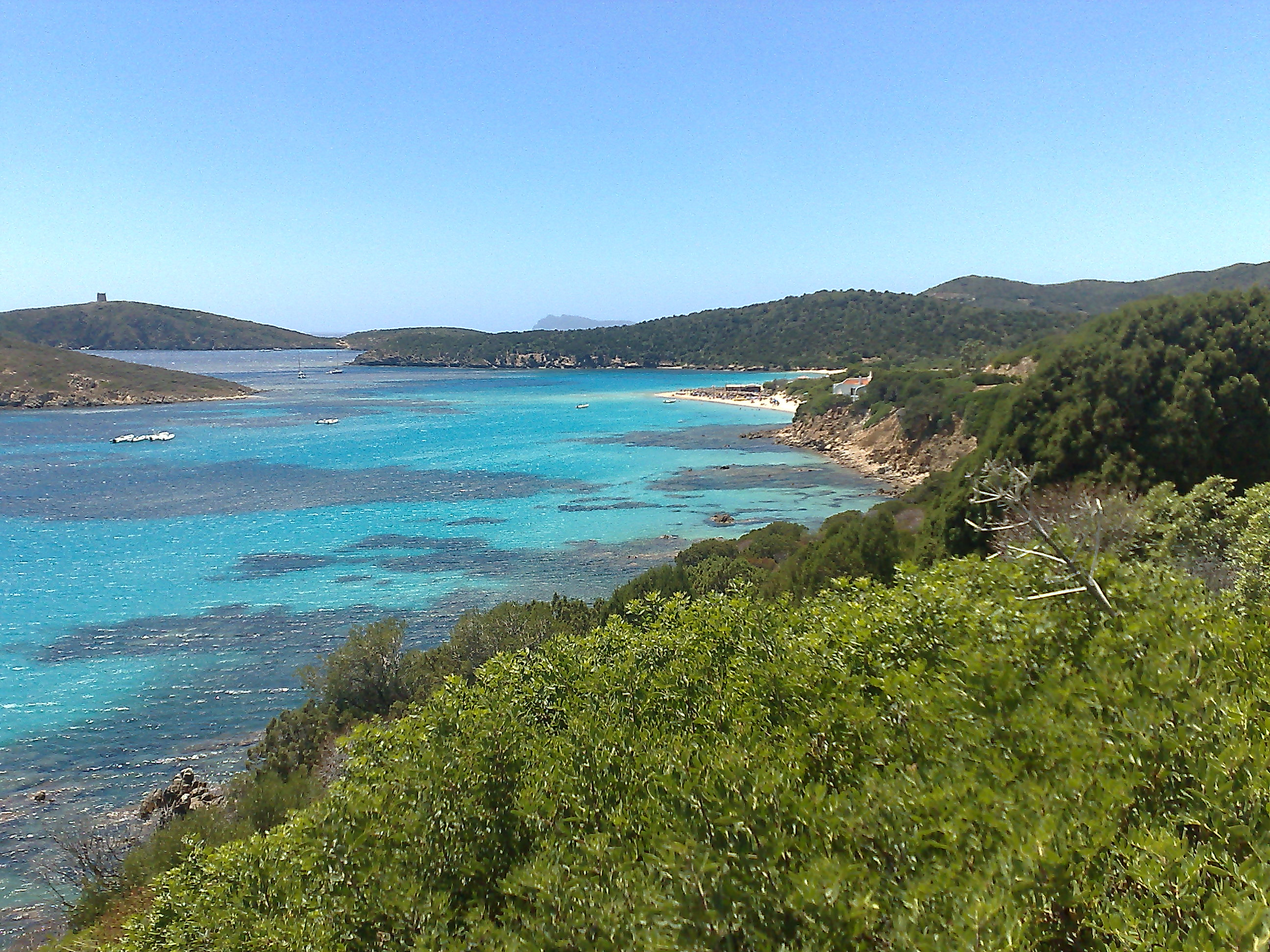
Tueredda beach

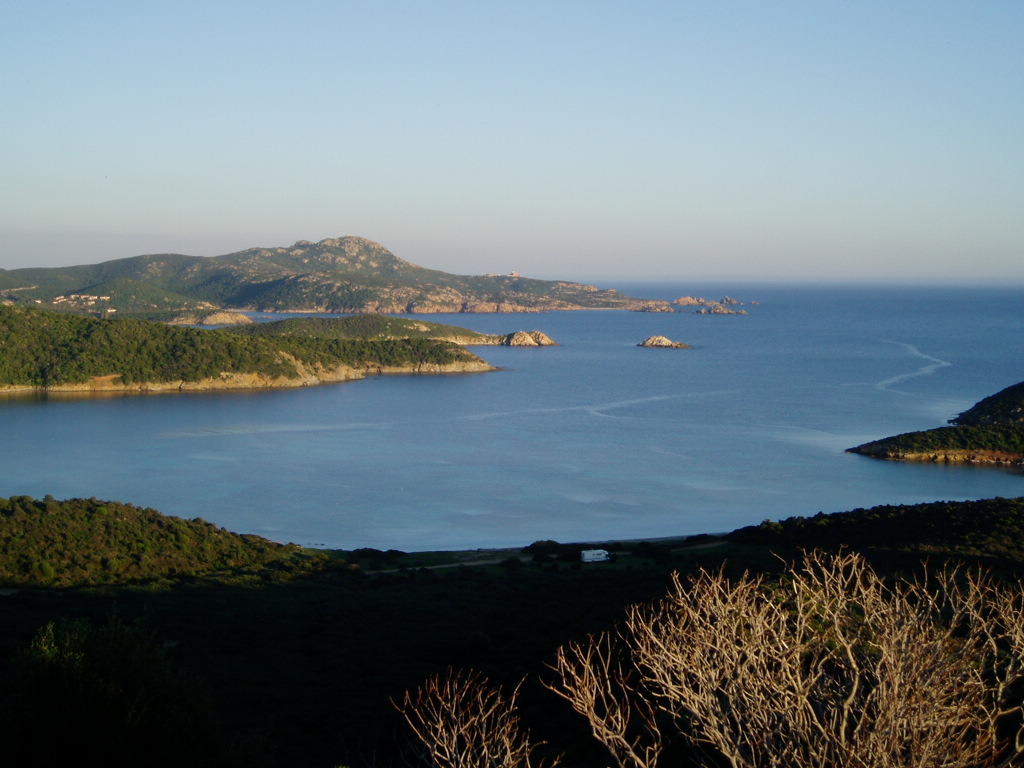
Capo Malfatano cape

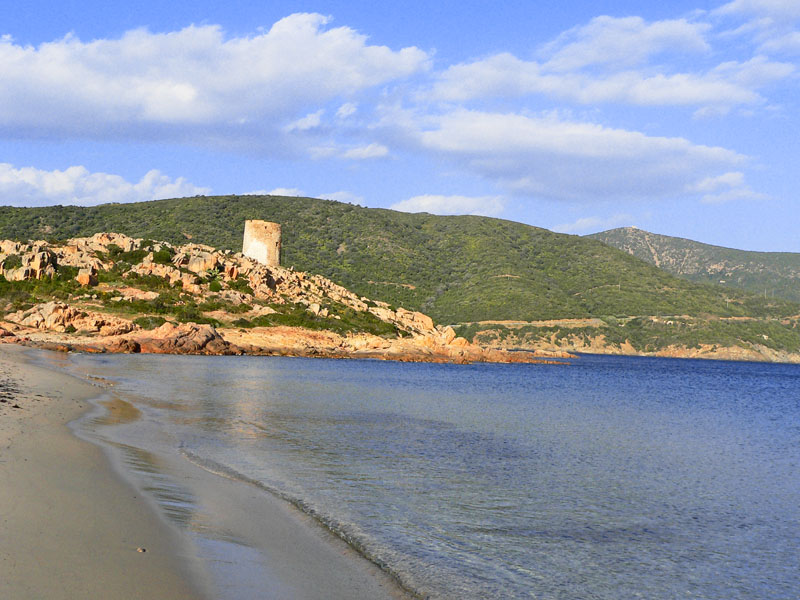
Porto Budello Tower

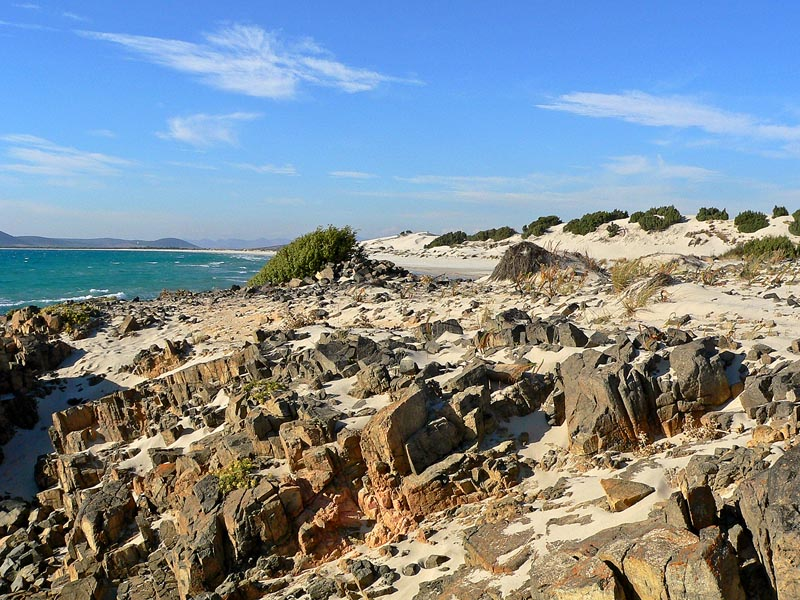
Is Arenas Biancas bay

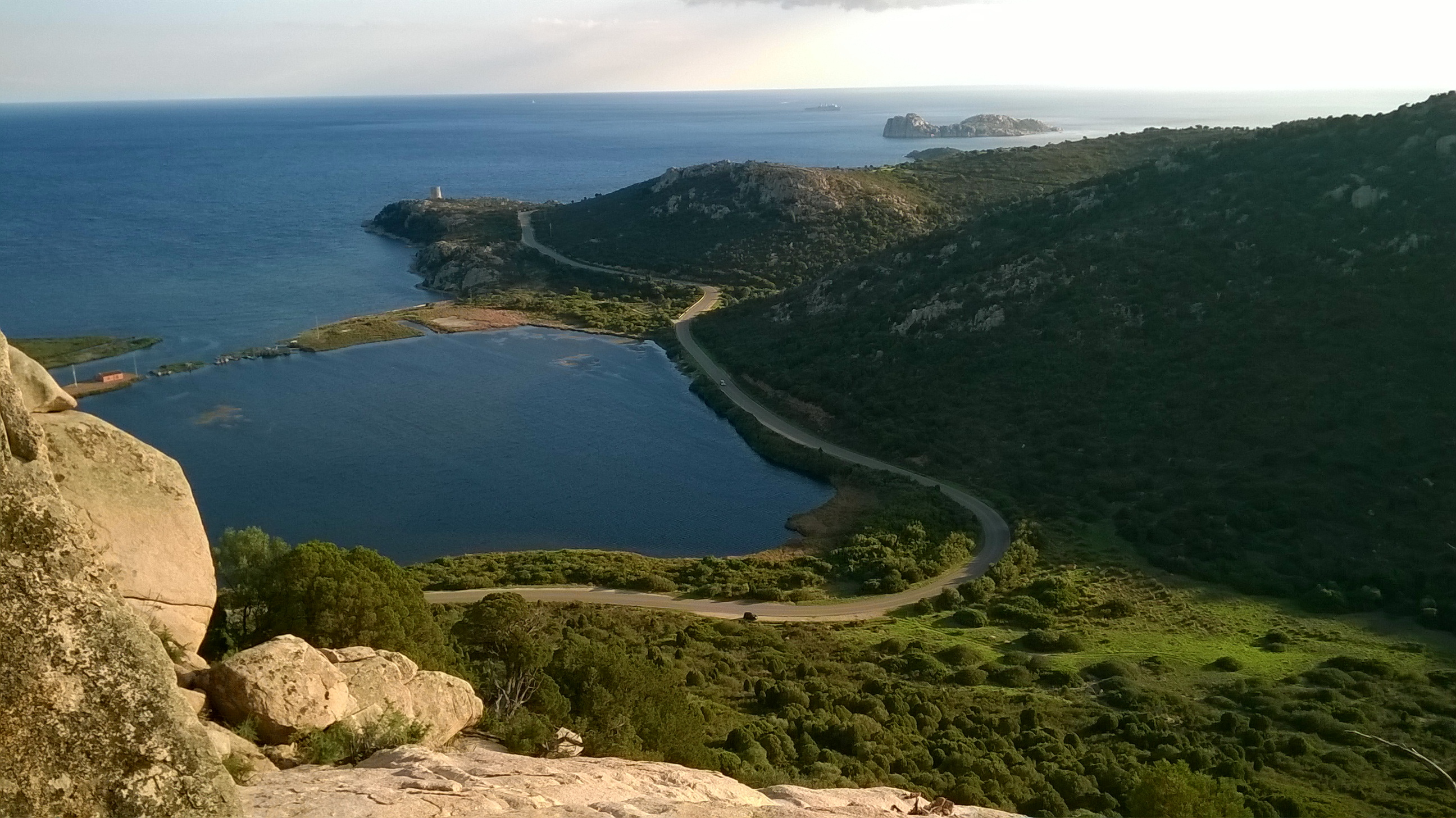
View of the Porto Budello tower and the red island from Mount Aidu

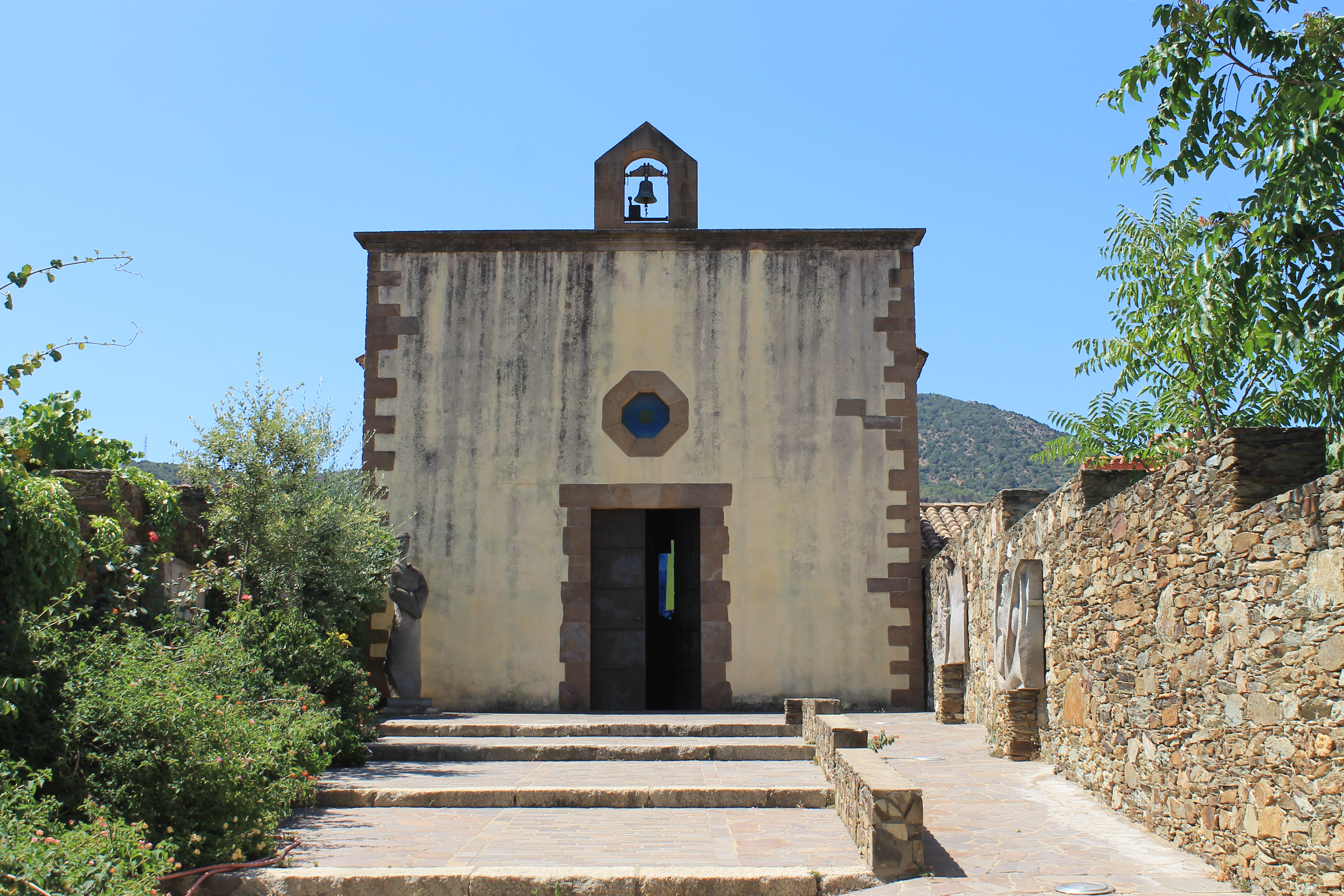
Church of San Francesco
