= Theophoric name =

Name embedding the name of a god

A theophoric name (from Greek: θεόφορος, theophoros, literally "bearing/carrying a god") embeds the word equivalent of 'god' or a god's name in a person's name, reflecting something about the character of the person so named in relation to that deity. For example, names embedding Apollo, such as Apollonios or Apollodorus, existed in Greek antiquity.

Theophoric personal names, containing the name of a god in whose care the individual is entrusted (or a generic word for god), were common in the ancient Near East and Mesopotamia.

== Classical Greek and Roman theophoric names ==
Greek and Roman theophoric names
Deity	Name	Meaning
Aphrodite	Aphrodisius, -a	
Aphrodite	Hermaphroditus	"Hermes and Aphrodite"
Apollo	Apollodorus, -a	"gift of Apollo"
Apollo	Apollonides	"son of Apollo"
Apollo	Apollonius	
Ares	Arius	"war-like"
Artemis	Artemiche	
Artemis	Artemidorus	"gift of Artemis"
Artemis	Artemisius, -ia	
Athena	Athenaeus	
Athena	Athenais	
Athena	Athenagoras	"man in Athena's market"
Athena	Athenodorus, -a	"gift of Athena"
Cephissus	Cephisodorus	"gift of Cephissus"
Cephissus	Cephisodotus	"given by Cephissus"
Demeter	Demetrius, -ia	
Demeter	Demetrodorus	"gift of Demeter"
Dionysus	Dionysius, -a, Dennis	
Dionysus	Dionysodorus, -a	"gift of Dionysus"
Dionysus	Dionysicles	"glory of Dionysus"
Fortuna	Fortunatus	"fortunate, lucky"
Hecate	Hecataeus	
Helios	Heliodorus	"gift of the Sun"
Hephaestus	Hephaestion	
Hera	Heracles	"glory of Hera"
Hera	Heraclitus	"glory of Hera"
Hera	Herodotus	"given by Hera"
Hermes	Hermaphroditus	"Hermes and Aphrodite"
Hermes	Hermesianax	"king Hermes"
Hermes	Hermione, Hermion	
Hermes	Hermippus	"horse of Hermes"
Hermes	Hermocrates	"strength of Hermes"
Hermes	Hermogenes	"born of Hermes"
Hermes	Hermolaus	"people of Hermes"
Isis	Isidorus, -a	"gift of Isis"
Mars	Marcus	
Mars	Martialis	"Mars-like"
Mars	Martinus	
Mene (Selene)	Menodora	"gift of the Moon"
Minerva	Minervina	"little Minerva"
Nymphs	Nymphodora	"gift of the nymphs"
Poseidon	Poseidippus	"horse of Poseidon"
Poseidon	Poseidorus, -a	"gift of Poseidon"
Poseidon	Poseidonius	
Serapis	Serapion	
Themis	Themistocles	"glory of Themis"
Zeus	Dio	of Zeus (gen. Dios)
Zeus	Diocles, Diocletian	"glory of Zeus"
Zeus	Diodorus	"gift of Zeus"
Zeus	Zeno	of Zeus (gen. Zenos)
Zeus	Zenobius, -ia	"might of Zeus"
Zeus	Zenodotus	"given by Zeus"

Certain names of classical gods are sometimes given as personal names. The most common is Diana and its variants, such as Diane; others include Minerva, Aphrodite, Venus, Isis, or Juno. The first pope to take a regnal name, Pope John II, had the given name Mercurius and changed his name as he considered it inappropriate for the pope to have a pagan deity's name.

== Christian theophoric names ==
- Abdisho: (Syriac) "servant of Jesus"
- Ahadabui, Ahidabu: (Syriac) "brother to the Father"
- Ahischema: (Syriac) "brother of the Schema"
- Bukhtishu: (Syriac) "redeemed by Jesus"
- Christian: (Greek) "believer in Christ"
- Christodoulos: (Greek) "servant of Christ"
- Christopher: (Greek) "Christ-bearer"
- Ishodad: (Syriac) "given by Jesus"
- Ishosabran, Sabrisho: (Syriac) "patient for Jesus"
- Ishoyahb, Yahbisho: (Syriac) "Jesus has given"
- Marnazka: (Syriac) "the Lord has conquered"
- Sabrisho, Ishosabran: (Syriac) "patient for Jesus"
- Shubhalisho, Shubhisho: (Syriac) "praise to Jesus"
- Slibazka: (Syriac) "the Cross has conquered"

Some Christian saints have polytheistic theophoric names (such as Saint Dionysius, Saint Mercurius, Saint Saturninus, Saint Hermes, Saint Martin of Tours, Saint Demetrius of Thessaloniki).

== Germanic theophoric names ==
- Os, meaning "god"
  - Oscar
  - Oslac
  - Oswald
  - Oswin
- Thor, the god of thunder
  - Thorstein means "Thor's stone"
  - Thorkel means "Thor's craft"
  - Thorulf means "Thor's wolf"
  - Thordis
  - Thora
- Ing, an old name for Freyr (an epithet meaning "lord")
  - Ingrid
  - Ingeborg
  - Inger
  - Ingunn

Rarely, Germanic names contain the element Wod (such as Woðu-riðe), potentially pointing to an association with the god Odin. Numerous names containing wulf "wolf" have been taken as totemistic, expressing association with Odin in the earliest period, although -ulf degenerated into a mere suffix from an early time.

== Pre-Islamic polytheism ==
- 'Abadah (Nabataean Aramaic: ʿŌbōdaṯ), "worship"
- 'Abd al-Hajar, "servant of the stone"
- 'Abd al-Ka'aba, "servant of the Kaaba"
- 'Abd Manaf, "servant of Manaf"
- 'Abd Manat, "servant of Manat"
- 'Abd Ruda, "servant of Ruda"
- 'Abd Shams, "servant of the sun"
- 'Abd al-'Uzza, "servant of Uzza"
- 'Abd Wadd, "servant of Wadd"
- 'Abd Yaghuth, "servant of Yaghūth"
- Asad al-Lat, "lion of al-Lat"
- Aws Manat, "gift of Manat"
- Imru' al-Qays, "man of Qays"
- Rabb'il (Nabataean Aramaic: Rabʾēl), "Lord is El"
- Sa'd Manat, "happiness of Manat"
- Taym al-Lat, "servant of al-Lat"
- Wahb al-Lat, "gift of al-Lat"
- Wahb'il (Safaitic: Whbʾl), "gift of El"
- Zayd Manat, "abundance of Manat"

== Islam ==
- Abd Allah: "servant of God"
- Ahsan Allah: "excellence of God"
- Ala al-Haqq: "nobility of the Absolute Truth"
- Ata Allah: "gift of God"
- Ata al-Ghani: "gift of the Rich"
- Ata al-Hakim: "gift of the All-Wise"
- Ata al-Haqq: "gift of the Absolute Truth"
- Ata al-Karim: "gift of the Generous"
- Ata al-Malik: "gift of the King"
- Ata ar-Rahman: "gift of the Most Compassionate"
- Ata as-Samad: "gift of the Self-Sufficient"
- Fath Allah: "victory of God"
- Fath al-Bari: "victory of the Initiator"
- Fath ar-Rahman: "victory of the Most Compassionate"
- Fazl Allah: "bounty of God"
- Fazl al-Halim: "bounty of the All-Enduring"
- Fazl al-Hakim: "bounty of the All-Wise"
- Fazl al-Haqq: "bounty of the Absolute Truth"
- Fazl al-Kabir: "bounty of the Greatest"
- Fazl al-Qadir: "bounty of the All-Powerful"
- Fazl ar-Rahim: "bounty of the Most Merciful"
- Fazl ar-Rahman: "bounty of the Most Compassionate"
- Habib Allah: "beloved of God"
- Habib al-Ghani: "beloved of the Rich"
- Habib al-Hamid: "beloved of the All-Praiseworthy"
- Habib al-Haqq: "beloved of the Absolute Truth"
- Habib ar-Rahman: "beloved of the Most Compassionate"
- Muhib Allah: "loving of God"
- Muhib al-Haqq: "loving of the Absolute Truth"
- Muhib ar-Rahman: "loving of the Most Compassionate"
- Mujib Allah: "answerer of God"
- Mujib al-Haqq: "answerer of the Absolute Truth"
- Mujib ar-Rahman: "answerer of the Most Compassionate"

== Judaism ==
Much Hebrew theophory occurs in the Jewish Bible. The most prominent theophoric names are:

- names containing El, a word meaning might, power and (a) god in general, and hence in Judaism, God and among the Canaanites the name of the god who was the father of Baal.
- names containing Yah, a shortened form of Yahweh.
- names referring to Levantine deities (especially the storm god, Hadad) by the epithet Baal, meaning lord.

In later times, as the conflict between Yahwism and the more popular pagan practices became increasingly intense, these names were censored and Baal was replaced with Bosheth, meaning shameful one. But abbreviations of the name Yahweh do not appear in theophoric names until the time of Joshua, and for the most part is very rare until the time of King Saul, when it began to be very popular.

=== El ===
- Abdiel: "Servant of God"
- Abiel: "my father is God"
- Ariel: "lion of God"
- Bezalel: "in the shadow / under the protection of God"
- Cassiel: "God is my wrath"
- Caftsiel: "God is my leap"
- Danel: "El is judge" or "justice from El"
- Daniel: "God is my judge" or "justice from God"
- Elijah: "my God is YHWH"
- Elihu: "He is my God"
- Elisha: "my God is salvation"
- Elisheba (Elizabeth): "my God is an oath" or "my God is abundance"
- Immanuel: "God is with us"
- Yehezkel (Ezekiel): "God will strengthen"
- Gabriel: "man of God" or "power of God"
- Hasdiel: "God is my kindness"
- Ishmael: "God listens"
- Israel: "who struggles with God"
- Lemuel: "Dedicated/Devoted to God"
- Mahalalel: "shining one of God"
- Mehujael: "God enlivens"
- Methusael: "Man of God"
- Michael: "Who is like God?"
- Nathaniel: "God-given" or "gift of God"
- Raphael: "God heals/God is great"
- Reuel: "God shall pasture"
- Samuel: "God heard"
- Sariel: "God is my ruler"
- Sathariel: "God is my moon" or "moon of God"
- Uriel: "God is my light"
- Uzziel: "God is my strength"
- Zadkiel: "God is my righteousness"
- Zerachiel: "God has remembered"

=== Yahweh ===
Abbreviations of the name of the Israelite deity YHWH (usually shortened to Yah or Yahu, and Yeho or Yo) appear as a prefix or suffix in many theophoric names of the First Temple Period. For example, Yirme-yahu (Jeremiah), Yesha-yahu (Isaiah), Netan-yah, Yedid-yah, Adoni-yah, Nekhem-yah, Yeho-natan (Jonathan), Yeho-chanan (John), Yeho-shua (Joshua), Yeho-tzedek, Zekharya (Zechariah).

"Yahū" or "Yah" is the abbreviation of YHWH when used as a suffix in Hebrew names; as a prefix it appears as "Y^{e}hō-", or "Yo". It was formerly thought to be abbreviated from the Masoretic pronunciation "Yehovah". There is an opinion that, as Yahweh is likely an imperfective verb form, "Yahu" is its corresponding preterite or jussive short form: compare yiŝt^{a}hawe^{h} (imperfective), yiŝtáhû (preterit or jussive short form) = "do obeisance".

- Abijah: "my father is YHWH"
- Adonijah: "YHWH is the Lord"
- Hezekiah: "YHWH strengthens"
- Isaiah: "YHWH is salvation"
- Jedediah: "friend of YHWH"
- Jehoadah – "YHWH adorns"
- Jehoaddan – "YHWH is delighted" / "pleasure of YHWH"
- Jehoahaz – "YHWH has grasped / taken hold"
- Jehoash – "YHWH has given / bestowed"
- Jehohanan – "YHWH is gracious'
- Jehoiachin – "YHWH establishes"
- Jehoiada – "YHWH knows"
- Jehoiakim – "YHWH raises up"
- Jehoiarib – "YHWH contends / pleads"
- Jehonadab (also Jonadab) – "YHWH is willing / generous"
- Jehonathan (also Jonathan) – "YHWH has given"
- Jehoram – "YHWH is exalted"
- Jehoshaphat – "YHWH judges"
- Jehosheba – "YHWH is an oath / fullness"
- Jehoshua (also Joshua / Jesus) – "YHWH is salvation"
- Jehozabad – "YHWH has bestowed / endowed"
- Jehozadak – "YHWH is righteous"
- Jehu: "YHWH is He"
- Jeremiah (Jeremy): "YHWH will raise"
- Joel: "YHWH is God"
- Jonathan: "YHWH has given"
- Joseph: "YHWH shall increase"
- Josiah: "YHWH saves"
- Matityahu (Matthew): "gift of YHWH"
- Micah/Micaiah: "who is like YHWH?"
- Nehemiah: "YHWH comforts"
- Obadiah: "servant of YHWH"
- Toviyahu (Tobias): "the goodness of YHWH"
- Uriah: "YHWH is my light"
- Uzziah: "YHWH is my strength"
- Yeho'ezer (Yoʼezer): "YHWH is my help"
- Yehoshua (Joshua)/Yeshua (Jesus): "YHWH will save"
- Yohanan (John): "graced by YHWH" or "YHWH is gracious"
- Zechariah (Zachary): "YHWH has remembered"
- Zephaniah: "hidden by YHWH"

In the table below, 13 theophoric names with "Yeho" have corresponding forms where the letters eh have been omitted. There is a theory by Christian Ginsburg that this is because Hebrew scribes omitted the "h", changing Jeho (יְהוֹ) into Jo (יוֹ), to make the start of "Y^{e}ho-" names not sound like an attempt to pronounce the Divine Name.

Strong's #		the name				other element	English conventional form	
long form	short form	long form		short form		other element	long form	short form
3059	3099	יְהוֹאָחָז	Yᵉho'achaz	יוֹאָחָז	Yo'achaz	achaz [# 270]	Jehoahaz	Joahaz
3060	3101	יְהוֹאָש	Yᵉho'ash	יוֹאָש	Yo'ash	'esh [# 784]	Jehoash	Joash
3075	3107	יְהוֹזָבָד	Yᵉhozabad	יוֹזָבָד	Yozabad	zabad [# 2064]	Jehozabad	Jozabad
3076	3110	יְהוֹחָנָן	Yᵉhowchanan	יוֹחָנָן	Yochanan	chanan [# 2603]	Yehochanan	Jochanan
3077	3111	יְהוֹיָדָע	Yᵉhoyada	יוֹיָדָע	Yoyada	yada [# 3045]	Jehoiada	Joiada
3078	3112	יְהוֹיָכִין	Yᵉhoyakin	יוֹיָכִין	Yoyakin	kun [# 3559]	Yehoyakin	Joiakin
3079	3113	יְהוֹיָקִים	Yᵉhoyaqim	יוֹיָקִים	Yoyaqim	qum [# 3965]	Yehoyakim	Joakim
3080	3114	יְהוֹיָרִיב	Yᵉhoyarib	יוֹיָרִיב	Yoyarib	rib [# 7378]	Jehoiarib	Joiarib
3082	3122	יְהוֹנָדָב	Yᵉhonadab	יוֹנָדָב	Yonadab	nadab [# 5068]	Jehonadab	Jonadab
3083	3129	יְהוֹנָתָן	Yᵉhonathan	יוֹנָתָן	Yonathan	nathan [# 5414]	Yehonathan	Jonathan
3085	—	יְהוֹעַדָּה	Yᵉho'addah	—	—	'adah [# 5710]	Jehoaddah	—
3087	3136	יְהוֹצָדָק	Yᵉhotsadaq	יוֹצָדָק	Yotsadaq	tsadaq [# 6663]	Jehozadak	Jozadak
3088	3141	יְהוֹרָם	Yᵉhoram	יוֹרָם	Yoram	rum [# 7311]	Jehoram	Joram
3092	3146	יְהוֹשָפָט	Yᵉhoshaphat	יוֹשָפָט	Yoshaphat	shaphat [# 8199]	Jehoshaphat	Joshaphat
3470a	3470	יְשַׁעְיָהוּ	Yᵉsha'yahu	יְשַׁעְיָה	Yᵉsha'yah	yasha [# 3467]	Yeshayahu	Isaiah
5418a	5418	נְתַנְיָהוּ	Nᵉthanyahu	נְתַנְיָה	Nᵉthanyah	nathan [# 5414]	Netanyahu	Netaniah
138a	138	אֲדֹנִיָּהוּ	'Adoniyahu	אֲדֹנִיָּה	'Adoniyah	'adown [# 113]	Adoniyahu	Adonijah
452a	452	אֵלִיָּהוּ	'Eliyahu	אֵלִיָּה	'Eliyah	'el [# 410]	Eliyahu	Elijah
3414a	3414	יִרְמְיָהוּ	Yirmᵉyahu	יִרְמְיָה	Yirmᵉyah	rum [# 7311]	Yirmeyahu	Jeremiah
—	5166	—	—	נְחֶמְיָה	Nᵉchemyah	nacham [# 5162]	—	Nechemiah

=== Referring to other gods ===
- Jerubbaal, the alternate name of Gideon, variously translated as "Baal will contend"
- Ishbaal: "man of Baal"
- Abijam: "my father is Yam"
- Mordecai: "from Marduk"

Theophoric names containing "Baal" were sometimes altered to -bosheth (“shame”), producing forms such as Ish-bosheth, likely reflecting later opposition to the deity.

== Ancient Near Eastern theophoric names ==
=== Aramean ===
- Hadadezer: "Hadad is help"

=== Assyrian ===
- Adad-nirari: (Akkadian) "Adad (is) my helper"
- Arad-Ninlil: "servant of Ninlil"
- Arda-Mulissu: "servant of Mullissu"
- Arik-den-ili: “long-lasting is the judgment of Il”
- Ashurnasirpal: "Ashur is guardian of the heir"
- Ashur-apla-idi: (Akkadian) "Ashur has known the heir" or "Ashur has cared for the son"
- Ashur-bel-kala: "Ashur is lord of all"
- Ashur-bel-nisheshu: “Assur (is) lord of his people”
- Ashur-dugul: “Look to Aššur!”
- Ashur-nadin-ahhe: "Ashur is the giver of brothers"
- Ashur-nadin-shumi: "Ashur gives a name"
- Ashur-nirka-da''inni: "Ashur, reinforce my crown" or "Ashur, make my authority firm"
- Ashur-rim-nisheshu: “Ashur loves his people”
- Ashur-shaduni:“Assur (is) our mountain”
- Ashur-uballit: (Akkadian) "Ashur has kept alive"
- Enlil-nasir: "Enlil is the protector" or "Enlil guards"
- Esarhaddon: "Ashur has given a brother"
- Ila-kabkabu: (Amorite) "God is a star" or "My god is a star"
- Ilu-shuma: "God is his name" or "God is the name"
- Išši'ak Aššur: "steward of Ashur" or "vice-regent of Ashur"
- Mar-Issar: "son of Ishtar"
- Muballitat-Sherua: (Akkadian) "Šerua is the one who gives life" or "Šerua keeps alive"
- Mullissu-mukannishat-Ninua: (Akkadian) "Mullissu is the subduer/victor of Nineveh"
- Nabu-shar-usur: "O Nabu, protect the king!"
- Nur-ili: "light of my God" or "my god is light"
- Puzur-Ashur: "protection of Ashur" or "secret of Ashur"
- Sennacherib: (Assyrian) "Sîn has replaced the brothers"
- Shalmaneser (Akkadian): "Salmānu is foremost"
- Shammuramat: "Sammu (god) is exalted" or "Sammu is beloved"
- Tukulti-Ninurta: "my trust is in Ninurta"

=== Babylonian ===
- Abednego: (Chaldean) "servant of Nabu"
- Adad-shuma-iddina: "Adad has given a son" or "Adad has bestowed an heir"
- Balthazar and Belshazzar: "Baal, protect the king"
- Belteshazzar: (Babylonian) "Bel, protect the king's life"
- Burna-Buriash: (Kassite) "protegée of Buriash"
- Meshach: (Chaldean) "who is as Aku is?"
- Mushezib-Marduk: (Akkadian) "Marduk is the one who rescues" or "Marduk is the deliverer"
- Nabopolassar: "Nabu, protect the son"
- Nebuchadnezzar: (Babylonian) "Nabu, watch over my heir"
- Nergal-ushezib: (Akkadian) "Nergal has saved" or "Nergal delivered [me]"
- Shadrach: (Chaldean) "command of Aku"
- Sin-Muballit: "Sîn gives life" or "Sîn keeps alive"
- Uballissu-Marduk: "Marduk has kept him alive" or "Marduk gave him life"

=== Carthaginian ===
- Hamilcar: (Punic) "brother of Melqart" or "Melqart is gracious"
- Hannibal: "grace of Ba'al" or "Ba'al is gracious"
- Hasdrubal: "help of Ba'al" or "Ba'al is my help"

=== Elamite ===
- Humban-Numena: "Humban is the creator" or "Humban has appointed [me]"
- Kidin-Hutran: "under the divine protection of Hutran" or "Aegis of Hutran"
- Puzur-Inshushinak: (Akkadian) "Inshushinak (is) protection"
- Untash-Napirisha: "Napirisha has created [me]" or "Napirisha has appointed [me]"

=== Hittite ===
- Kupanta-Kurunta: "Decreed by the Stag God Kurunta"

=== Mariote ===
- Itūr-Mēr: "Mer has turned [to me]" or "Mer has returned"
- Yaggid-Lim: (Amorite) "Lim (deity) is stretched out" or "Lim extends/lengthens" or "may the god Lim prolong (life or the dynasty)"
- Yahdun-Lim: "Lim favors" or "Lim is gracious/gives pleasure"
- Zimri-Lim: "my protection is Lim" or "Lim is my help/strength"
- Tukulti-Mer: "my trust is in Mer"

=== Phoenician ===
- Jezebel (Phoenician): "glory to Baal"
- Pygmalion (Phoenician via Greek): "Pummay has given"

=== Samarian ===
- Sanballat: (Akkadian) "Sîn has kept alive"

=== Sumerian ===
- Ishme-Dagan: "Dagon has heard"
