= Athenagoras =

Athenagoras may refer to:

- Athenagoras of Ephesus (6th century BC), a Greek tyrant of Ephesus
- Athenagoras of Samos (5th century BC), Greek ambassador during the Greco-Persian Wars
- Athenagoras of Syracuse (5th century BC), a statesman and military leader in Syracuse during the Sicilian Expedition
- Athenagoras of Miletus (4th century BC), Greek mercenary general
- Athenagoras of Macedon (2nd–3rd century BC), a general serving Philip V and Perseus
- Saint Athenagoras of Athens a.k.a. Saint Athenagorus the Apologist (2nd century AD), early Christian philosopher
- Athenagoras (physician), ancient Greek physician
- Patriarch Athenagoras (1886–1972), Patriarch of Constantinople
- Athenagoras (Fell), a 1682 biography of Athenagoras of Athens by British theologian John Fell
