= Abiel =

Abiel is a given name. It may refer to:

== People ==
- Abiel Abbot (1770–1828), American clergyman
- Abiel Chandler (1777–1851), American merchant
- Abiel Foster (1735–1806), American clergyman and politician
- Abiel Holmes (1763–1837), American clergyman and historian
- Abiel Leonard (1848–1903), American Anglican bishop
- Abiel Abbot Low (1811–1893), American entrepreneur, businessman, trader and philanthropist
- Abiel Wood (1772–1834), American politician

== Biblical figures ==
- Abiel (biblical figures), two minor biblical figures

== See also ==
- Abeel
