= Piscinamanna =

Valley and a forest in southern Sardinia

Piscinamanna (also Pixina Manna) is a valley and a forest in southern Sardinia, near the town of Pula.

It hosts the campus of the Technology Park of Sardinia; its major research topics of the Park are ICT, Biotech, and Energy. The Technology Park of Sardinia opened its doors in 2003. Since that time 65 companies and research centres have established their research and development activities on its site. The Park is hosting a CRS4 research centre (http://www.crs4.it).

== See also ==
- Energy law#European Union
