= Nora Stone =

Ancient inscription found at Nora on the south coast of Sardinia in 1773

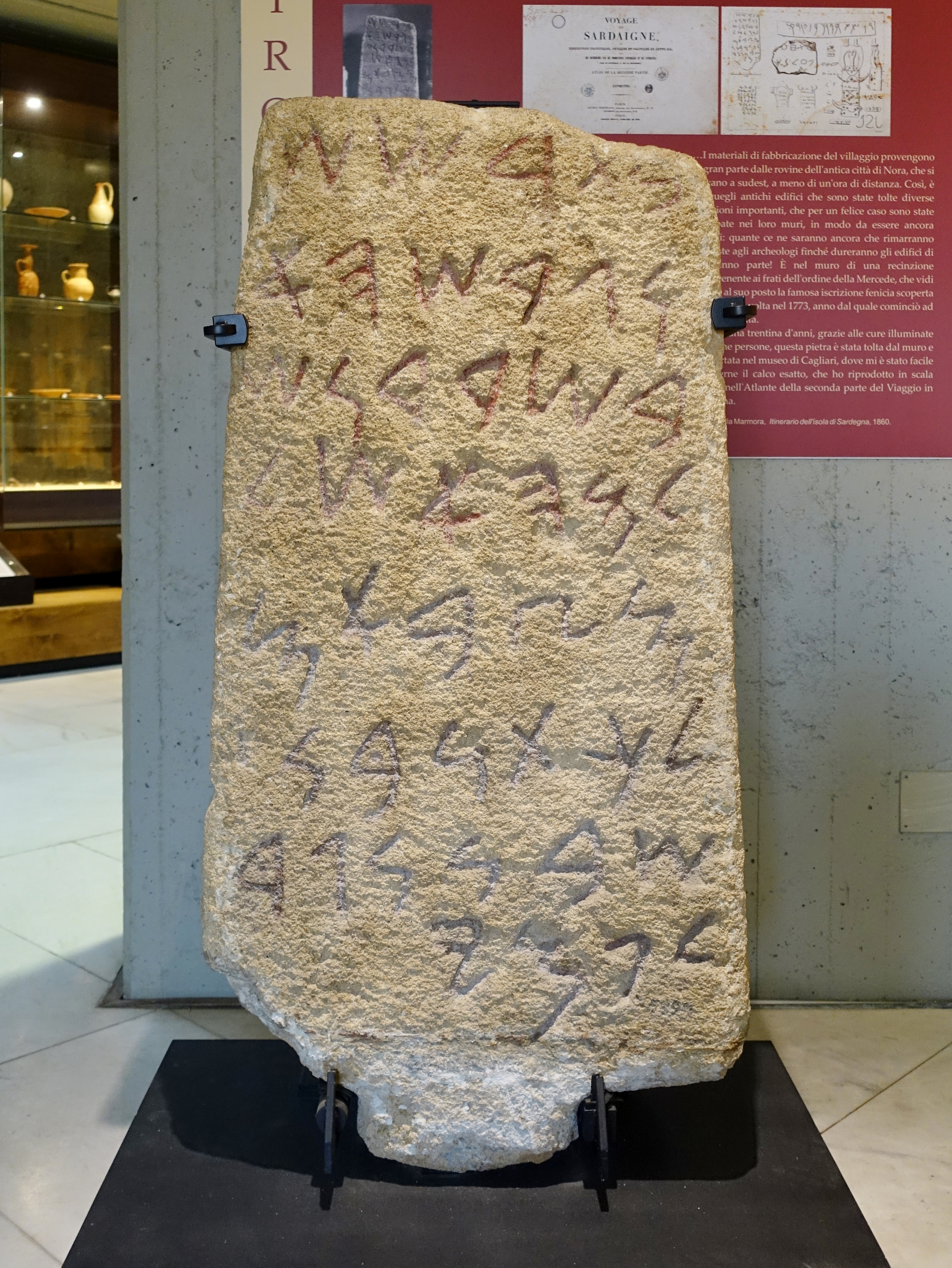
Stele of Nora, Museo archeologico nazionale in Cagliari

The Nora Stone or Nora Inscription is an ancient Phoenician inscribed stone found at Nora on the south coast of Sardinia in 1773. Though it was not discovered in its primary context, it has been dated by palaeographic methods to the late 9th century to early 8th century BCE and is still considered the oldest Phoenician inscription found anywhere outside of the Levant.

It is conserved at the Museo archeologico nazionale, Cagliari, and is considered particularly notable due to its reference to the name Sardinia in Phoenician. The inscription is known as KAI 46.

== Discovery and publication ==
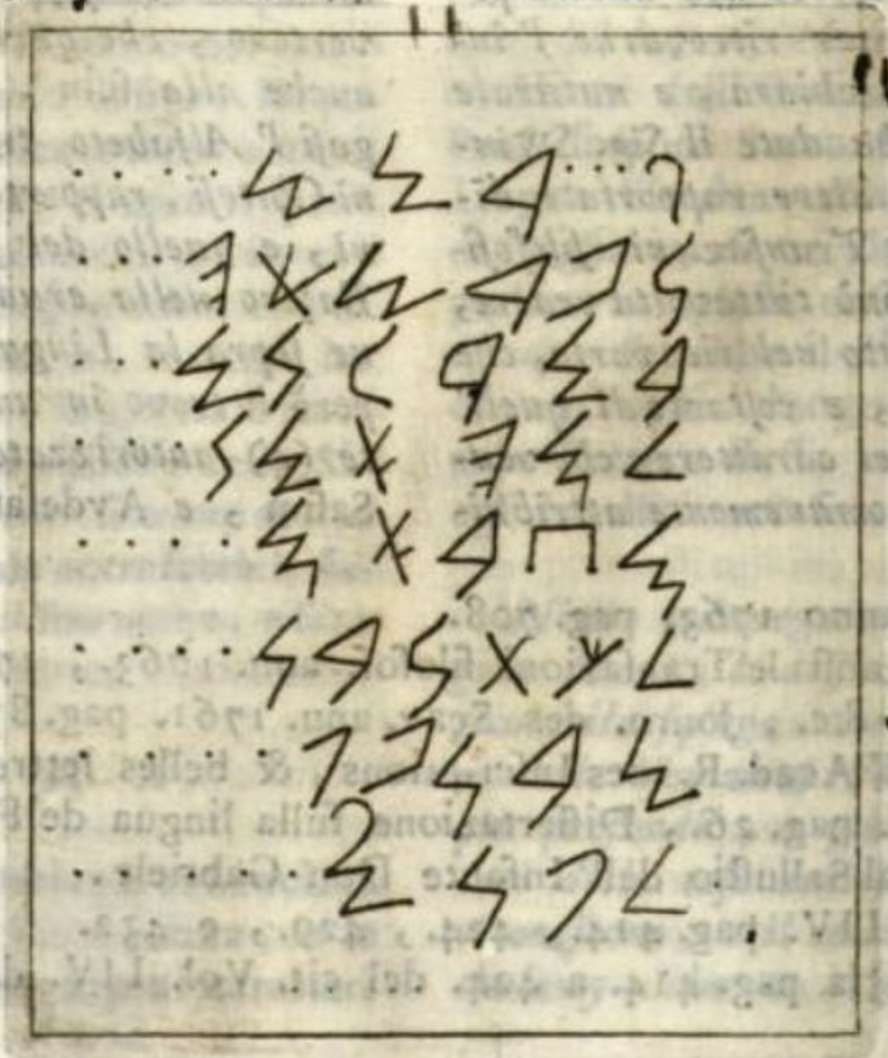
Rossi's 1774 image of the inscription. It was criticized as "extrêmement infidèle" (extremely inaccurate) by Alberto della Marmora in the early 19th century.

Discovery of the stone was announced in 1774 in the journal Efemeridi letterarie di Roma, which published a letter sent by Giovanni Bernardo De Rossi, then Professor of Oriental Languages at the University of Parma to Giovanni Cristofano Amaduzzi Professor of Greek Language at the Sapienza University of Rome.

It was discovered by Giacinto Hintz, professor of Sacred Scripture and Hebrew / Oriental languages at the University of Cagliari, in a secondary location, incorporated in a dry stone wall near the apse of the Chiesa di Sant'Efisio outside of Pula, Sardinia (immediately adjacent to what became known as the archaeological site of Nora).

== Inscription ==
A possible reference to Pygmalion of Tyre is inferred by an interpretation of the fragmentary inscription, made by Frank Moore Cross as follows:

Line	Transcription	Translation (Peckham)	Translation (Cross)
a.			He fought (?)
b.			with the Sardinians (?)
1	btršš	From Tarshish	at Tarshish
2	wgrš hʾ	he was driven;	and he drove them out.
3	bšrdn š	in Sardinia he	Among the Sardinians
4	lm hʾ šl	found refuge,	he is [now] at peace,
5	m ṣbʾ m	his forces found refuge:	(and) his army is at peace:
6	lktn bn	Milkuton, son of	Milkaton son of
7	šbn ngd	Shubon, the commander.	Shubna, general
8	lpmy	To Pmy.	of (king) Pummay.

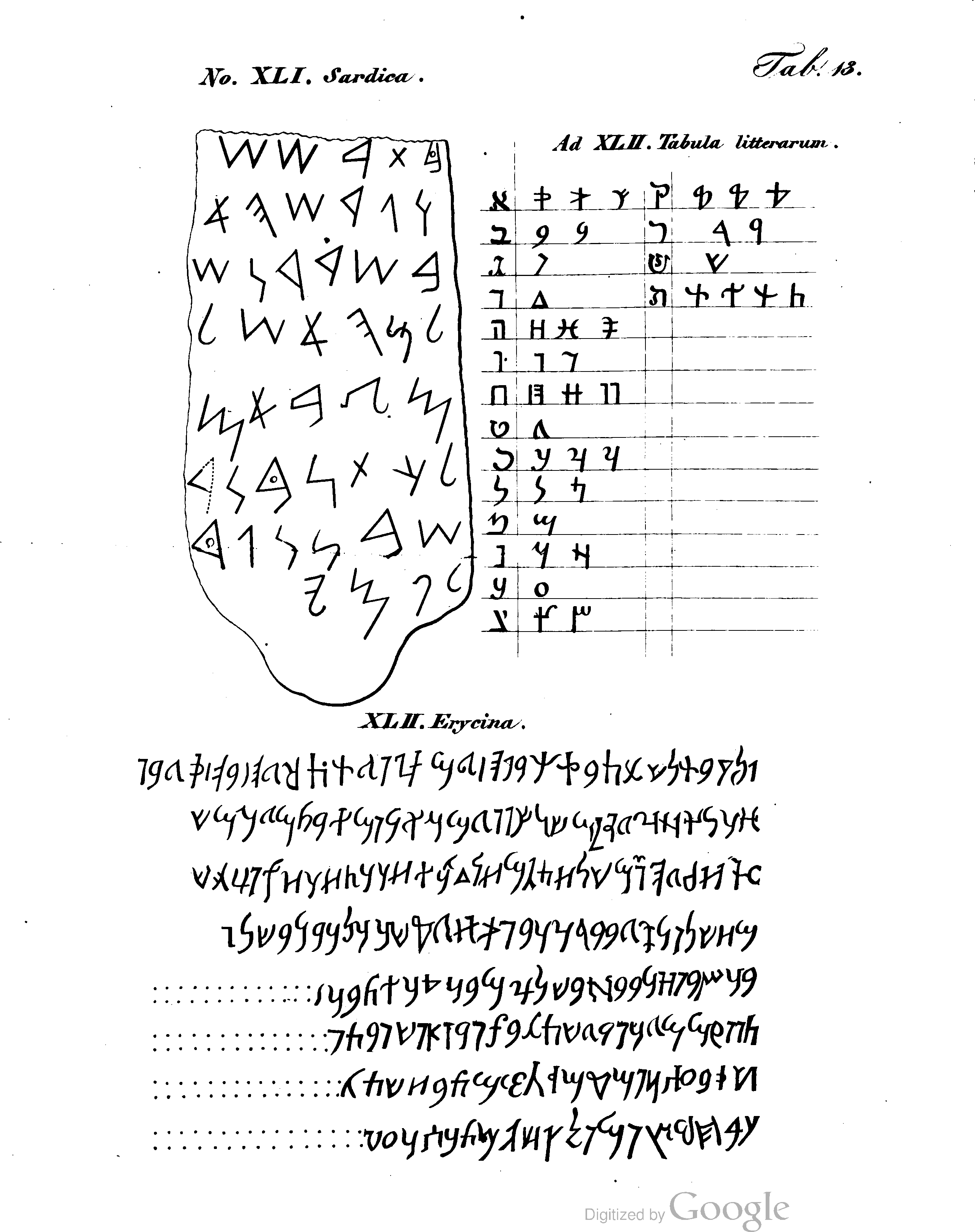
Nora Stone in Gesenius's 1837 Scripturae Linguaeque Phoeniciae Monumenta

== Interpretation ==
In this rendering, Cross has restored the missing top of the tablet (estimated at two lines) based on the content of the rest of the inscription, as referring to a battle that has been fought and won. Alternatively, "the text honours a god, most probably in thanks for the traveller's safe arrival after a storm", observes Robin Lane Fox.

According to Cross the stone had been erected by a general, Milkaton, son of Shubna, victor against the Sardinians at the site of TRSS, surely Tarshish. Cross conjectures that Tarshish here "is most easily understood as the name of a refinery town in Sardinia, presumably Nora or an ancient site nearby." He presents evidence that the name pmy ("Pummay") in the last line is a shortened form (hypocoristicon) of the name of Shubna's king, containing only the divine name, a method of shortening “not rare in Phoenician and related Canaanite dialects.” Since there was only one king of Tyre with this hypocoristicon in the 9th century BCE, Cross restores the name to pmy[y]tn or p‘mytn, which is rendered in the Greek tradition as Pygmalion.

Cross's interpretation of the Nora Stone provides additional evidence that in the late 9th century BCE, Tyre was involved in colonizing the western Mediterranean, lending credence to the establishment of a colony in Carthage in that time frame. Pygmalion, the Greek version of the Phoenician royal name Pumayyaton, also figures in the founding legend of Paphos in Cyprus, and Robin Lane Fox more cautiously finds a Cypriote association possible: "The traveller even may have had links with Cyprus, suggesting the Cypriot contacts had guided Phoenicians to this island."

This hypothesis is not however universally accepted and has been rejected by other scholars who have translated it differently.
