= Þórdís Kristmundsdóttir =

Icelandic academic

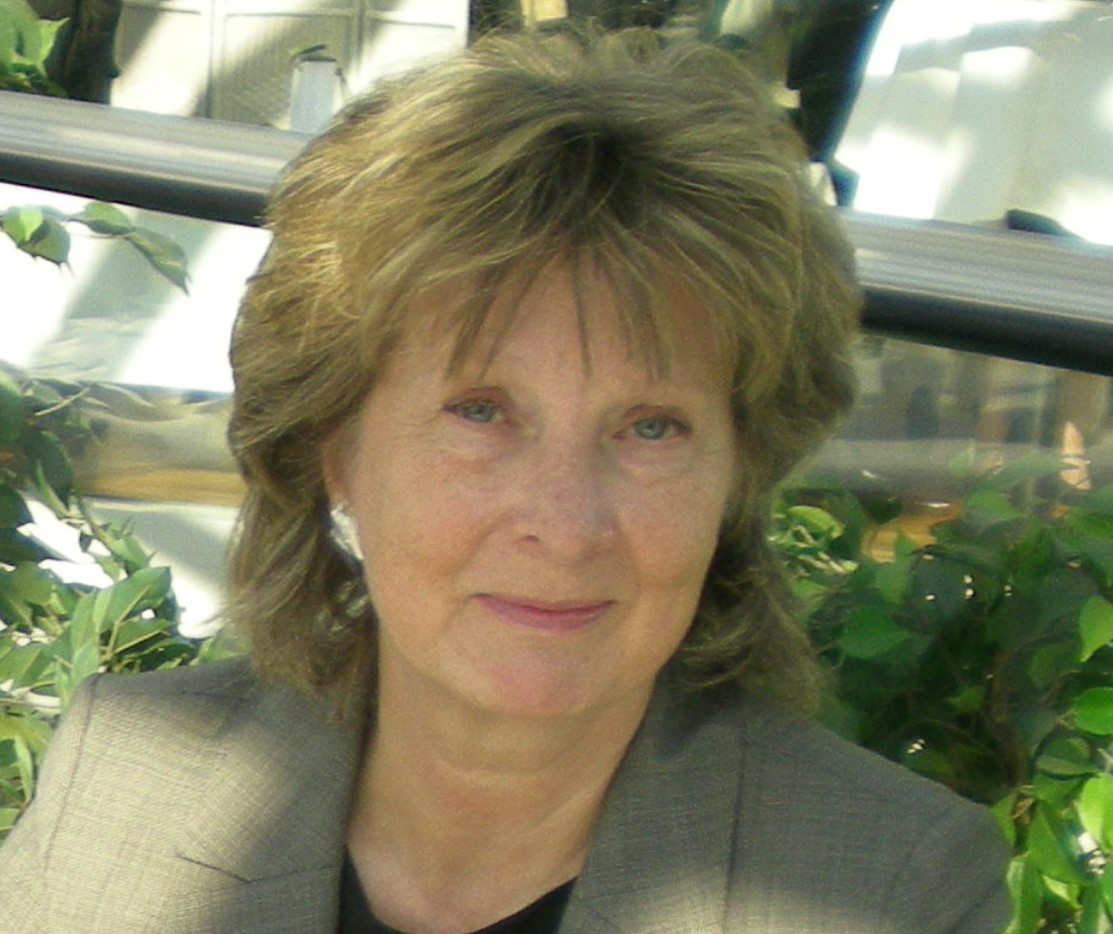
- Born: 1948 (age 77–78)
- Occupation: retired professor in pharmaceutics at the University of Iceland

Þórdís Kristmundsdóttir (born 13 November 1948) is a retired professor in pharmaceutics at the University of Iceland. She was only the second woman to be appointed Professor within the University of Iceland, following the appointment of Margrét Guðnadóttir, a virologist.

== Professional career ==
Dr. Kristmundsdóttir graduated from the Reykjavik Grammar School in 1968, received an MSc degree in pharmacy and subsequently her PhD from the Victoria University of Manchester in England in 1976. She was accredited a specialist in pharmaceutics by the Pharmaceutical Society of Iceland in 1977. Dr. Kristmundsdóttir became a post-doctoral research fellow in the School of Pharmacy and Pharmaceutical Sciences at the University of Manchester funded by I.C.I. Pharmaceuticals during 1977–1979.

In the fall of 1979, Dr. Kristmundsdóttir started working initially as a specialist in the pharmacy program at the University of Iceland later became a lecturer. In 1986 she was appointed Professor of pharmaceutics at the University of Iceland, where she worked until retirement in 2018.

== Research ==
The main emphasis of Dr. Kristmundsdóttir's research focused on the development and evaluation of pharmaceutical forms containing bactericidal fatty acids and monoglyceride, active ingredients in preventing infections through membranes and for treating skin and membrane infections. The results of her research demonstrated: 1) the advantages of using lipids in treating skin infections, and 2) that the membranes as the microbicidal lipids with which she has worked neither cause irritation nor allergies and do not provoke the body's natural defences. Her research showed that lipids could become an inexpensive source of microbicides to treat infections. The research work conducted by Dr. Kristmundsdóttir and her collaborators resulted in the formation of two spin-off companies at the University of Iceland. Dr. Kristmundsdóttir has lectured in many countries and has written numerous papers and book chapters in her fields of expertise. She has received many awards and patents for her research contributions.

== Various tasks and projects ==
Dr. Kristmundsdóttir served as Editor of the Icelandic Pharmaceutical Journal 1980–1984 and sat on the education board of the Pharmaceutical Society of Iceland 1985–1988. She was executive director of the Pharmaceutical Society of Iceland 1979–1981, was a member of the committee for graduate studies of the Pharmaceutical Society during 1994–1996, and on the board of the Nordic Federation for Pharmaceutical Education (NFFU) 1997–2001. Dr. Kristmundsdóttir served on the board of the Institute of Pharmacy, Pharmacology and Toxicology, University of Iceland 1997–1999. 8 Dr. Kristmundsdóttir sat on the governing board of the Faculty of Medicine during 1988–1992 and 1996–2000 as well as serving on the governing board of the Pharmacy Program during the years 1986–1987, 1989–1991, 1993–1995, 1997–1999. She led the development of the Faculty of Pharmaceutical Sciences at Hagi with Professor Þorsteinn Loftsson and Professor Kristín Ingólfsdóttir, former Rector of the University of Iceland. Dr. Kristmundsdóttir was elected the first Chair of the Faculty of Pharmaceutical Sciences when it was established 2000–2003 and again 2009–2011. Additionally, Dr. Kristmundsdóttir served as the chair of the board of the University Pharmacy (Reykjavíkur Apótek-Háskólaapótek).

Dr. Kristmundsdóttir was the representative of the School of Health Sciences on the university's Council during 2006–2008, and she was a member of a committee set up by the University Council during 2000–2002 reviewing the laws and regulations of recruitment and selection committees within the university.

Dr. Kristmundsdóttir served on the board of the department of biology and medicine of the Icelandic Center for Research Fund (RANNÍS) in the years 1987–1994 and was vice-chair of the Fund during 1991–1994. She was also a member the board of the expert panel for the RANNÍS Technical Fund 1998–2002 and was a member of the University of Iceland Trust Fund (Rannsóknarsjóður Háskóla Íslands) during 1995–2005. Dr. Kristmundsdóttir was a member of the Science Committee of the University of Iceland during 2001–2005 and 2011–2014 and in the year 2000 she represented the School of Health Sciences on the panel of experts for the Icelandic Steamship Company Fund (Eimskipafélagssjóður).

Dr. Kristmundsdóttir served on the administrative committee of Nordiska Forskarkurser (e. Nordic Research Courses) 1990–1991 and was Iceland's representative on the Nordic Science Fund later named NordForsk 1991–1996. She served on the board of the Science Fund of the Icelandic Cancer Society 1989–1992, was vice-chair of the Fund 1990–1991 and Chair 1991–1992, as well as being the representative of the Icelandic Cancer Society on the board of Nordisk Cancer Union 1990–1992. She served on the board of NFFU (e. Nordic Federation for Pharmaceutical Education) 1997–2001. She also served on the board of the Research Liaison Office of the University of Iceland and was Chair of the Intellectual Property Committee of the University of Iceland and Landspítali-University Hospital 2002–2009, and later she became the first Chair of the Doctoral Studies Committee in the School of Health Sciences at the University of Iceland 2014–2017. She also had a seat on the Complaints Committee for Student Issues at the University of Iceland, was the representative of the University of Iceland on the policy committee for mutual affairs of the University of Iceland and Landspítali-University Hospital and served as Chair of the University of Iceland Student Achievement and Incentive Fund.

During the years 1986–1988, Dr. Kristmundsdóttir served as vice-chair of the Association of University Teachers and she became the first woman to join Rotary Reykjavik (along with Ambassador Sigríður Snævarr) and served as the club's secretary during 1997–1998.

Additionally Dr. Kristmundsdóttir has served on various committees under the auspices of the University Council and the Rector of the University of Iceland, has organized a number of scientific conferences, served on Master's and Doctoral committees, sat on various selection committees for appointment of lecturers, senior lecturers and Professors and University Rectors, as well as holding numerous managerial positions and commissions of trust within the University of Iceland.

== Recognition ==
Dr. Kristmundsdóttir received the innovation award of Tækniþróun hf. (Technical Development) (along with W. Peter Holbrook and Skúli Skúlason) in 1998 and an award from IADR (International Association for Dental Research) and GlaxoSmithKline (GSK) in 2005 for research into the development of several drug formulations that have been tested in clinical trials for treating diseases in the oral cavity that are relatively common (along with W. Peter Holbrook, Halldór Þormar and Skúli Skúlason). In November 2018, Prof. Kristmundsdóttir was awarded the golden crest by the Pharmaceutical Society of Iceland for her active work and devotion benefitting pharmacy studies and the Pharmaceutical Society of Iceland.

== Personal life ==
Prof. Kristmundsdottir was born and raised in Reykjavík. She is the daughter of Kristmundur Jakobsson (1923–2014), radio operator and telephone engineer, and Ástdís Gísladóttir (1926–1999), housewife. Dr. Kristmundsdóttir is married to Dr. Eiríkur Örn Arnarson, Professor Emeritus in the Faculty of Medicine at the School of Health Sciences, University of Iceland (1949-) and accredited clinical psychologist. Their daughters are Hildur, business administrator, and Kristín Björk, pharmacist.

== Main written works ==
- Neyts J, Kristmundsdóttir T, De Clercq E, Thormar H. Hydrogels containing monocaprin prevent intravaginal and intracutaneous infections with HSV-2 in mice: Impact on the search for vaginal microbicides. Journal of Medical Virology. 2000;61(1):107-10.
- Kristmundsdottir T, Jonsdottir E, Ogmundsdottir HM, Ingolfsdottir K. Solubilization of poorly soluble lichen metabolites for biological testing on cell lines. Eur J Pharm Sci. 2005;24(5):539-43.
- Thormar, H., Bergsson, G., Gunnarsson, E., Georgsson, G., Witvrouw, M., Steingrimsson, Ó., De Clercq E., Kristmundsdóttir, T. Hydrogels containing monocaprin have potent microbicidal activities against sexually transmitted viruses and bacteria in vitro. Sexually Transmitted Infections. 1999;75(3):181-5.
- Skulason, S., Holbrook, W. P., Kristmundsdottir, T. Clinical assessment of the effect of a matrix metalloproteinase inhibitor on aphthous ulcers. Acta Odontol Scand. 2009;67(1):25-9.
- Hilmarsson H, Traustason BS, Kristmundsdóttir T, Thormar H. Virucidal activities of medium- and long-chain fatty alcohols and lipids against respiratory syncytial virus and parainfluenza virus type 2: Comparison at different pH levels. Archives of Virology. 2007;152(12):2225-36.
- Holbrook, W. P., Kristmundsdóttir, T., Loftsson, T. Aqueous hydrocortisone mouthwash solution: clinical evaluation. Acta Odontologica Scandinavica. 1998;56(3):157-60.
- Thorgeirsdóttir, T. O., Thormar, H., & Kristmundsdóttir, T. Effects of polysorbates on antiviral and antibacterial activity of monoglyceride in pharmaceutical formulations. Die Pharmazie, 1998. 58(4), 286–287.
