= Þórdís =

Þórdís or Thordis is an Icelandic name. Notable people with the name include:

- Þórdís Árnadóttir (1933–2013), Icelandic swimmer
- Thordis Brandt (born 1940), German-American actress
- Thordis Elva, Icelandic author
- Þórdís Gísladóttir (born 1965), Icelandic author
- Þórdís Hrönn Sigfúsdóttir (born 1993), Icelandic footballer
- Þórdís Kolbrún R. Gylfadóttir (born 1987), Icelandic politician
- Þórdís Kristmundsdóttir (born 1948), Icelandic professor
- Thordis Loa Thorhallsdottir (born 1965), Icelandic politician
