= Nora, Italy =

Ancient city in today's Pula, Sardinia, Italy

Coordinates: 38.984685°N 9.015860°E

Nora
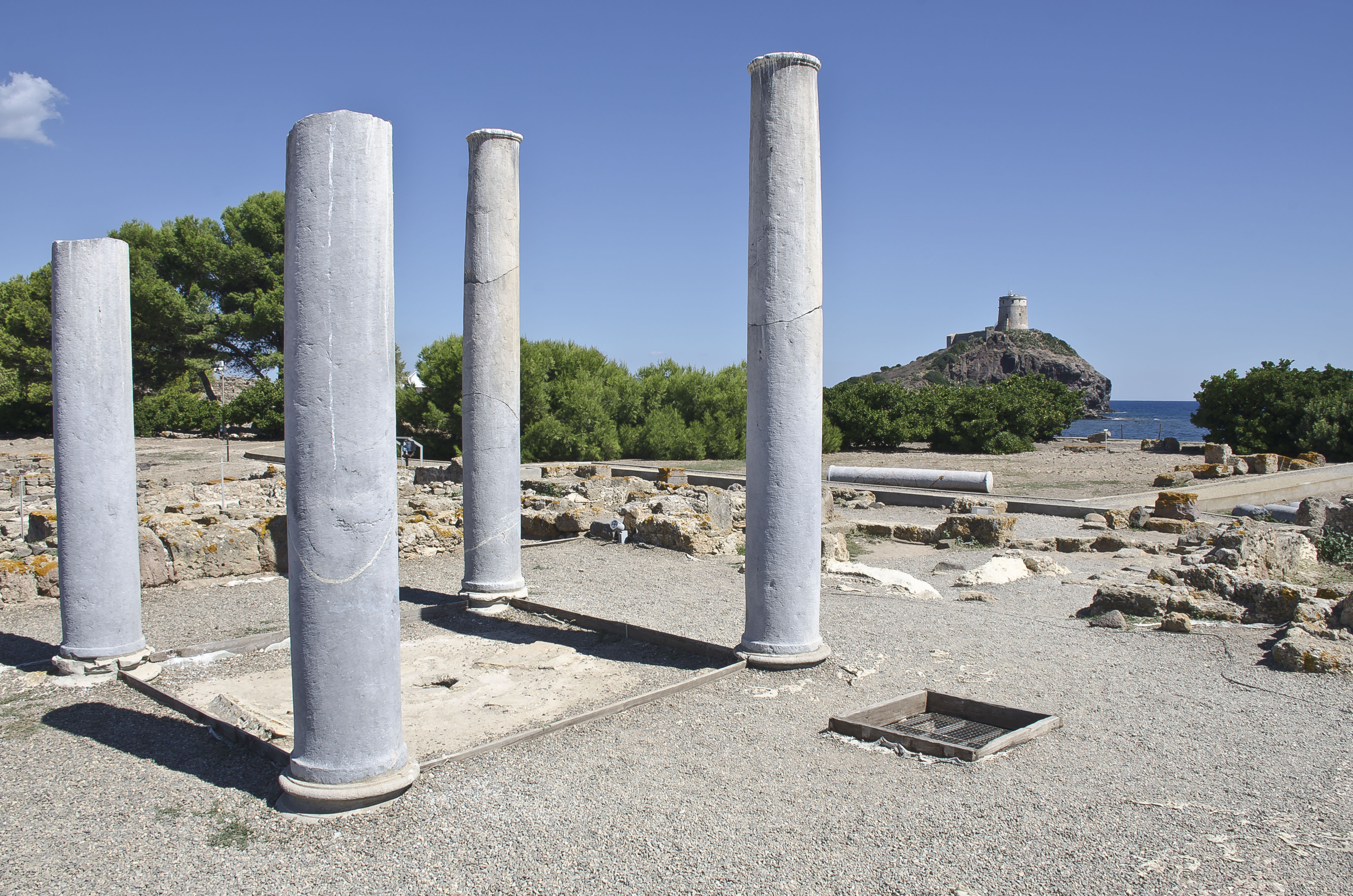
- Archaeological site of Nora, with the Spanish tower in the background.

- Location within Sardinia
- Type: Settlement
- Cultures: Phoenician civilization Roman civilization

Site notes
- Excavation dates: yes
- Condition: ruined
- Management: I Beni Culturali della Sardegna
- Public access: yes
- Website: Pula, area di Nora(in Italian)

Nora (Ancient Greek: Νῶρα) (Nuras in the mediaeval Sardinian language) is an ancient pre-Roman and Roman town on a peninsula near Pula, near to Cagliari in Sardinia.

== History ==
In his Description of Greece, Pausanias, a Greek-Roman geographer of the second century, narrates the mythological foundation of the city: "After Aristaeus, the Iberians crossed to Sardinia, under Norax as leader of the expedition, and they founded the city of Nora. The tradition is that this was the first city in the island, and they say that Norax was a son of Erytheia, the daughter of Geryon, with Hermes for his father." Solinus wrote that it was named Nora after Norax.

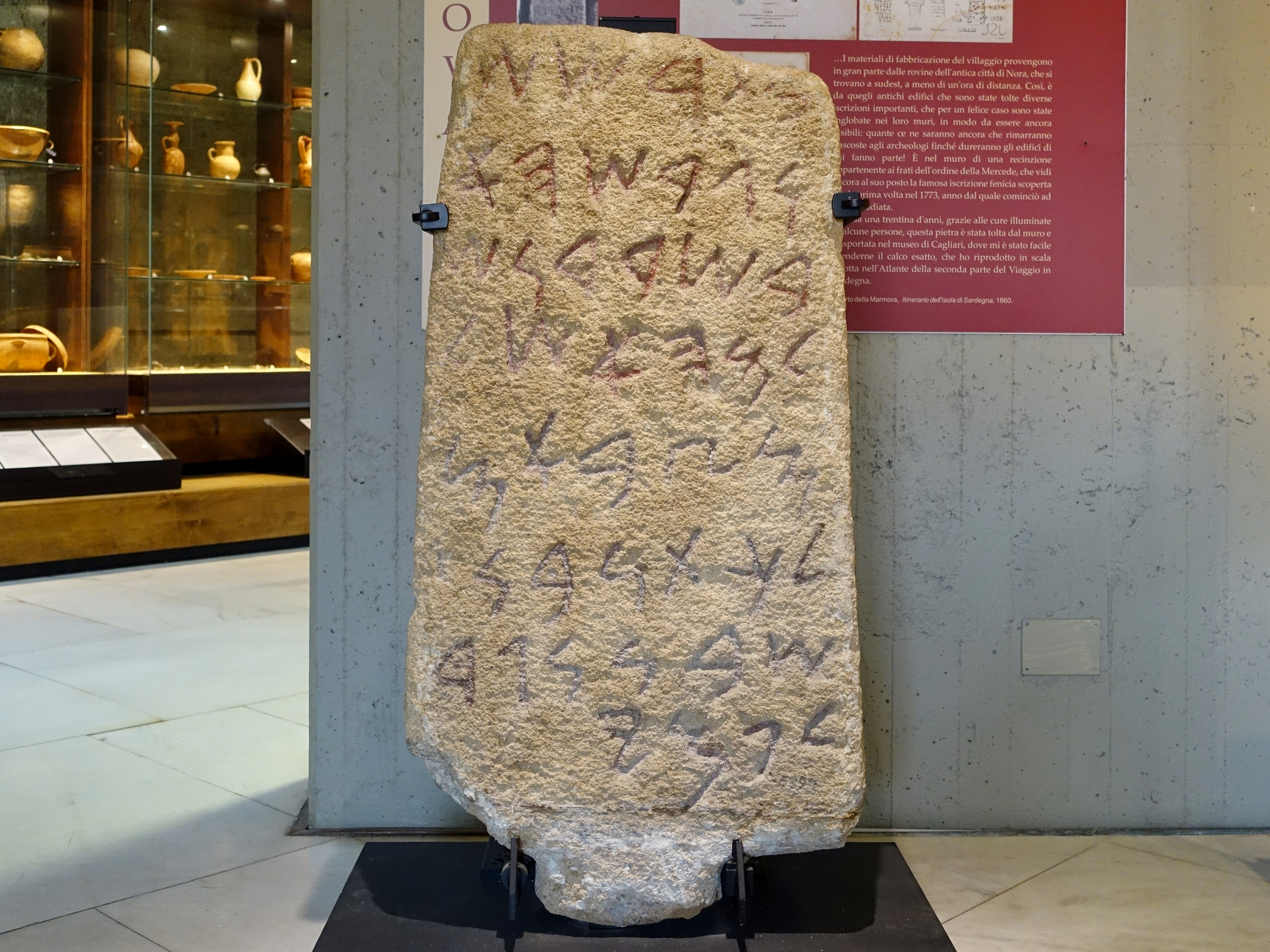
Nora Stone

Early on the area was occupied by a village of indigenous Sardinians, but soon became an emporium and then a Phoenician city. Especially after the conquest by Carthage, Nora flourished, as (along with Bithia near Chia) it was the first stage on the sea route from Carthage to Sardinia and its most important city, Cagliari. The Nora Stone, a Phoenician inscription found at Nora in 1773, has been dated by palaeographic methods to between the late 9th century and early 8th century BC, and has been interpreted as referring to a Phoenician military victory and conquest of the area.

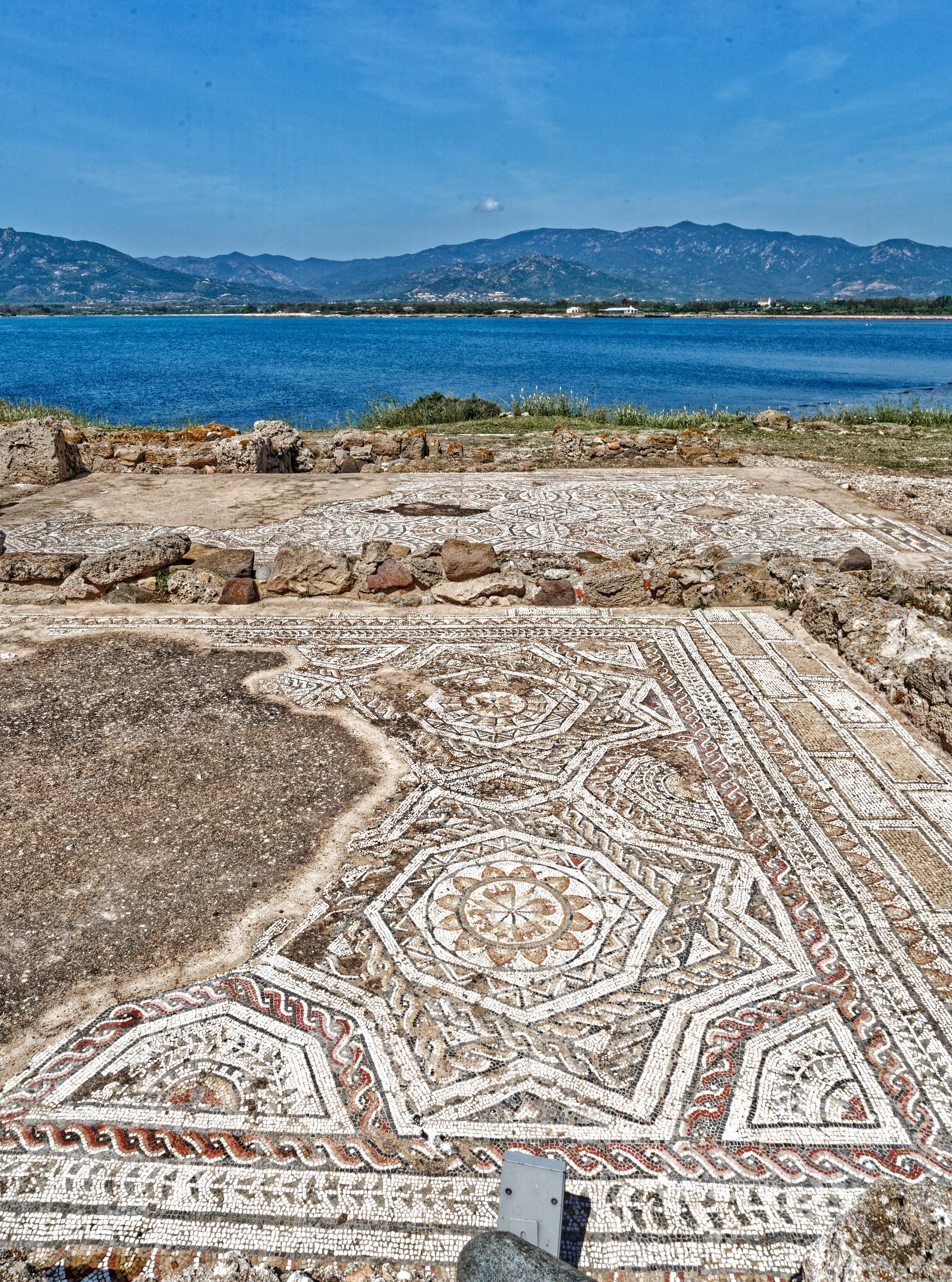
Roman mosaic

After a period of domination by Carthage, the town came under Roman control after the conquest of Sardinia in 238 BC. The city is mentioned in the Tabula Peutingeriana, a Roman-period itinerarium. It went into decline from the mid-5th century AD after the Vandal conquest of Sardinia. The island was taken by the Eastern Romans in 535, who ruled it for 300 years. According to the Ravenna Cosmography, after the Arab conquest of Carthage in 698 the city lost its economic function and became a simple fort (Nora praesidium). Nora appears to have been abandoned during the 8th century.

Its toponym, however, remained in the name of a curadoria (main administrative division) of Judicatus of Caralis at the beginning of the second millennium.

== Archaeology ==
Because the southern part of Sardinia is sinking into the Mediterranean Sea, a substantial part of the former town is now under water. A similar fate has befallen nearby Bithia, now completely submerged.

Nora was an important trading town in its time, with two protected harbours, one on each side of the peninsula. Several different building styles can be seen in the excavated buildings.

The ancient ruins of Nora include an open-air museum and the remains of a theatre, occasionally used for concerts in the summer.

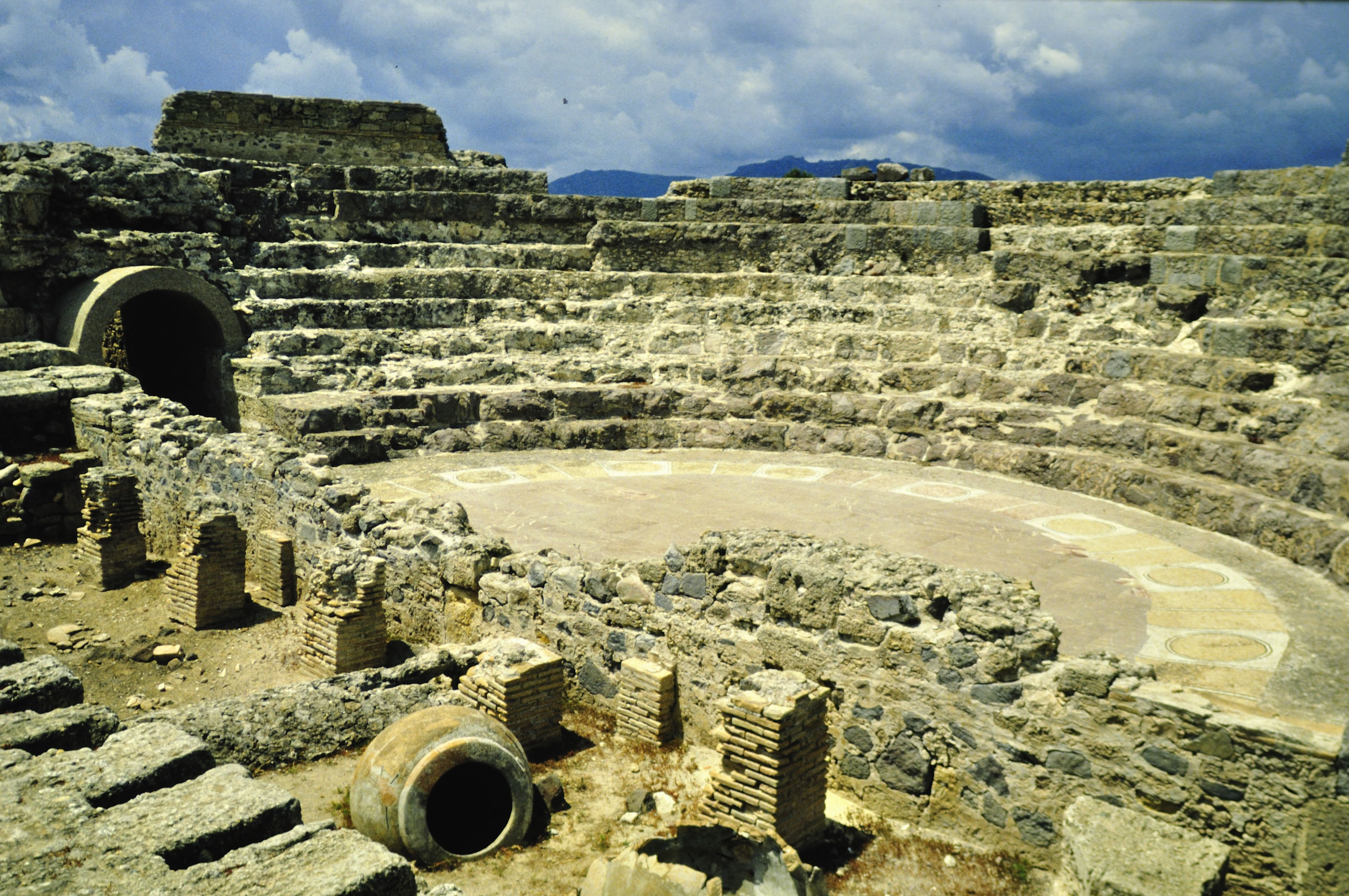
Roman-Era Theatre

A significant part of the town situated on land belonging to the Italian Army has not been excavated.
