= Pummay =

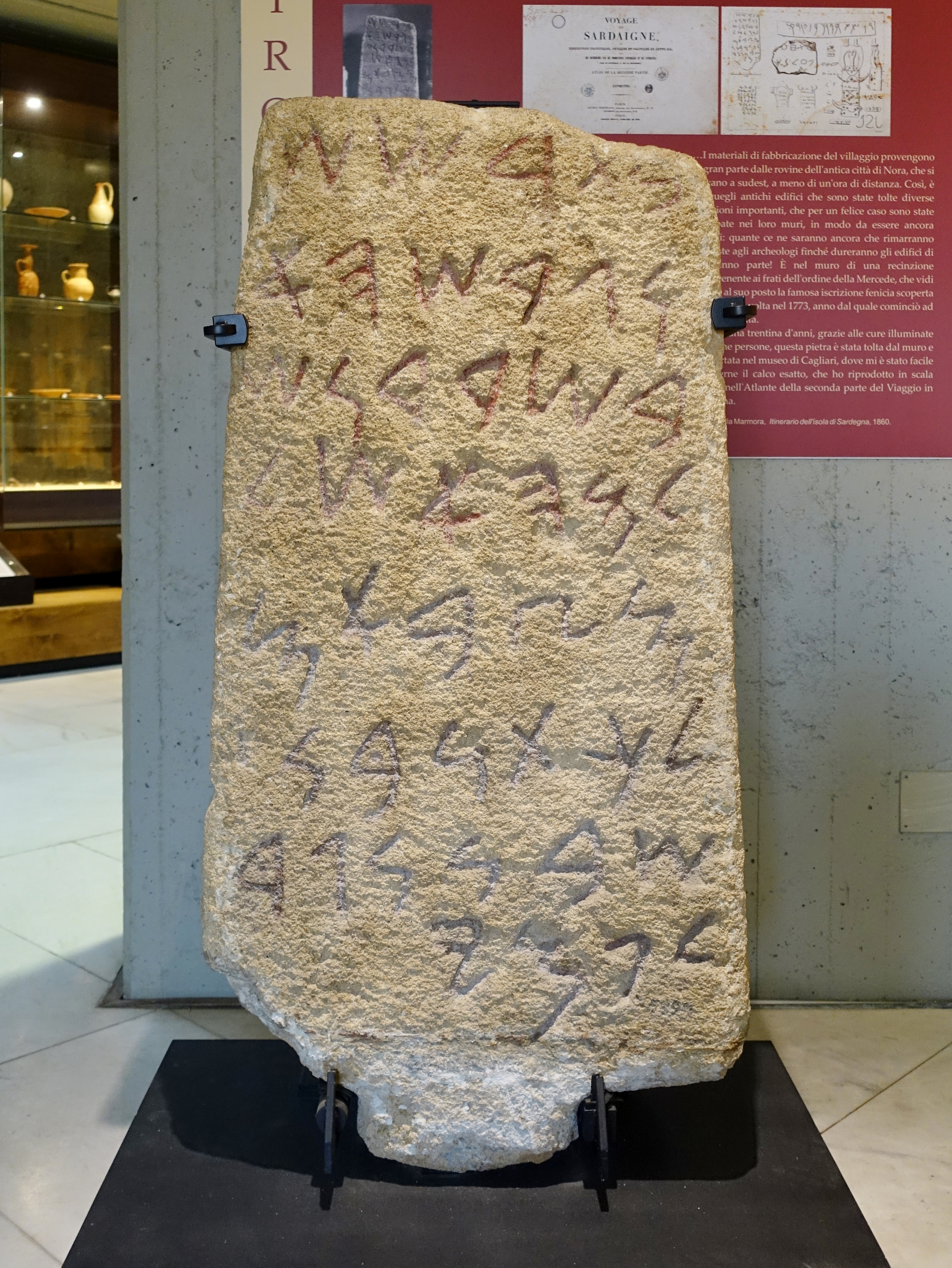
The Nora Stone (c. 800 BC); the last line is 𐤋𐤐𐤌𐤉 (L PMY), thought to mean "[dedicated] to Pummay."

Pummay (Phoenician: 𐤐𐤌𐤉, Pūmay; 𐤐𐤏𐤌𐤉 Pū(ġ)‘may) is a putative Phoenician deity of whom little is known. Pummay is attested to primarily in theophoric names, such as that of Pygmalion of Tyre. Because so little is known about the deity, scholars are unable to assert what Pummay's tutelary function was or what he was associated with. In the context of the legend of Dido and the founding of Carthage, certain scholars opine that Pummay was also worshipped by ancient Cypriots.
