= Abeel =

Abeel is a surname. Notable people with the surname include:

- David Abeel (1804–1846), American Christian missionary
- Gustavus Abeel (1801–1887), American Christian pastor, missionary and writer
- Johannes Abeel (1667–1711), American merchant and public official
- Cornplanter (c. 1752–1836), a Seneca chief and descendant of Johannes Abeel who was also known as John Abeel III.

== See also ==
- Abiel
