= Abul Kalam Zakaria =

Bangladeshi Islamic Scholar

Faqihul Millat, Mufti Abul Kalam Zakaria

3rd Principal of Jamea Qasimul Uloom Dargah Hajrat Shah Jalal, Sylhet
- In office 21 October 2009 – 11 March 2019
- Preceded by: Abdul Hannan
- Succeeded by: Muhibbul Haque Gachbari
- Title: Faqihul Millat

Personal life
- Born: 15 March 1956 Bagua, Bishwamvarpur, Sunamganj
- Died: 11 March 2019 (aged 63)
- Home town: Sunamganj
- Children: 6
- Education: Jamea Qasimul Uloom Dargah Hazrat Shah Jalal, Sylhet

Religious life
- Religion: Islam
- Jurisprudence: Hanafi
- Creed: Maturidi
- Movement: Deobandi

Abul Kalam Zakaria (15 March 1956 – 11 March 2019), also known as Faqihul Millat, was a Bangladeshi Deobandi Islamic scholar, jurist, and educationist. He was the principal and the Grand Mufti of Jamea Qasimul Uloom Dargah Hazrat Shah Jalal Sylhet and editor of the monthly magazine al-Qasim. In the greater Sylhet region, he made unique and extraordinary contributions to the religious, educational, and various other social activities.

== Early life and education ==
Abul Kalam Zakaria was born on 15 March 1956 into a Muslim family of Lal Miah and Khairun Nesa in Bagua village of Bishwamvarpur Upazila in Sunamganj District.

His educational journey began in 1963 when he enrolled in the Bagua Madrasa in his village. After completing his primary education in the village, he was admitted to Jamia Arabia Ramnagar Barmouttar Madrasa in Sunamganj Sadar in 1969, where he started his higher secondary studies. In 1973, he moved to Jamea Qasimul Uloom Dargah Hazrat Shah Jalal Madrasah, Sylhet. After studying the Tafseer of the Quran, Hadith, the principles of Hadith, and various other Islamic sciences here for five years, he participated in the Dawra-e-Hadith exam organized by Azad Dini Edara-e-Taleem Bangladesh in 1978 and secured 1st place in the merit list.

== Career ==
After completing his education in 1978, in the same year, he began his professional career by joining as a teacher at Jamea Qasimul Uloom Dargah Hazrat Shah Jalal, Sylhet. In 1981, he was entrusted with the responsibility of the Fatwa Department (Islamic Law) at Jamea Qasimul Uloom Dargah Hazrat Shah Jalal, Sylhet. In 2001, he became assistant secretary of education at Jamia Dargah. In 2006, he became the assistant director, and in 2009, he took the responsibility as a director, serving in this role until his death. He held the position of khateeb at the Dargah Mosque and the Amberkhana Shahi Jame Masque.

== Personal life ==
In 1980, he married Rukaiya Begum, the second daughter of Maulana Abdul Haque Saykhe Gazinagari, an Islamic scholar from Sylhet. They had four sons and five daughters.

== Writing ==
In his professional life, he authored and edited different sorts of books alongside his teaching career. At the same time, he utilized his efficiency in multiple languages to translate tons of books.

=== Authored and translated works ===
- Bangla Translation of Shahih Bukhari Sharif (28th part) published by Islamic Foundation
- The life of Esa (A.S.)
- The uncovering of the light of truth
- Adabul Mutallimin (The manners of students)
- Why wiping on the ordinary socks isn't permissible
- Taqreere Qasimi Sharhe Tafseere Bayjabi (Urdu)
- Malabudda Minhu (Urdu)
- Edara Bangla Literature (part 1)

=== Editorial works ===
He edited various books, including Maktab Lession (4th Volume), Short Talimul Islam Volumes 1, 2, and 3, Addurusul Arabia, Urdu Adab, al-Irshad, which are from Azad dini Edara e Taleem Bangladesh and so on. Apart from these, he was the editor of the monthly magazine al-Qasim, the official publication and representative of Jamea Qasimul Uloom Dargah Hazrat Shah Jalal, Sylhet.

== Death ==
On the afternoon of 11 March 2019, he had a stroke while at his workplace, Dargah Madrasa. He was taken to Sylhet MAG Osmani Medical College Hospital, but he died on the way at 5 PM. The following day (Tuesday), his funeral prayer was organised at 11 AM in the field of the Sylhet Government Alia Madrasah. The funeral prayer was led by Muhibbul Haque Gachbari, the Sheikhul Hadith of Dargah Madrasah. After the funeral prayer, he was buried in the cemetery in front of the Darul Ikama building of Jamea Qasimul Uloom Dargah Hazrat Shah Jalal.

== See also ==
- List of Deobandis
