= Athenagoras of Syracuse =

5th-century BC Greek politician

Athenagoras of Syracuse (Ancient Greek: Ἀθηναγόρας) an elusive character who is only commented on in Thucydides (6.36–40). The context of his speech in Thucydides is 415 BC, during the Peloponnesian War, when Athens was about to invade Sicily (Magna Graecia). He denies the invasion, rudely retorting to Hermocrates' speech that no invasion was imminent. The basic outline of his speech is as follows:

- The Athenians who were already fighting a war against Sparta would not want two equally large wars on their hands
- Highlighting the strength of Syracuse and Sicily
- Scaring the population of Syracuse to gain power (aimed at Hermocrates)
- In any state the wise should rule using both sides of the argument (contrasting between the oligarchs and masses)
- Difference between an oligarchy and a democracy
- Again highlighting strength of Syracuse

Harvey Yunis, in an article in the American Journal of Philology, argues a number of points about the speech:

- "As if to leave no doubt about the iron of Athenagoras’ fraudulent democratic rhetoric, Thucydides reports that following the debate the Syracusan assembly was prevented from making any decision at all." (193)
- "In the case of Athenagoras we are shown a politician who virtually succeeds in turning a deliberation assembly into a mob" (194)
- "Athenagoras dismisses the invasion issue and seeks to inflame passions by gratuitously raising the spectre of an oligarchic revolt" (194).
