= Margrét Guðnadóttir =

Icelandic virologist (1929–2018)

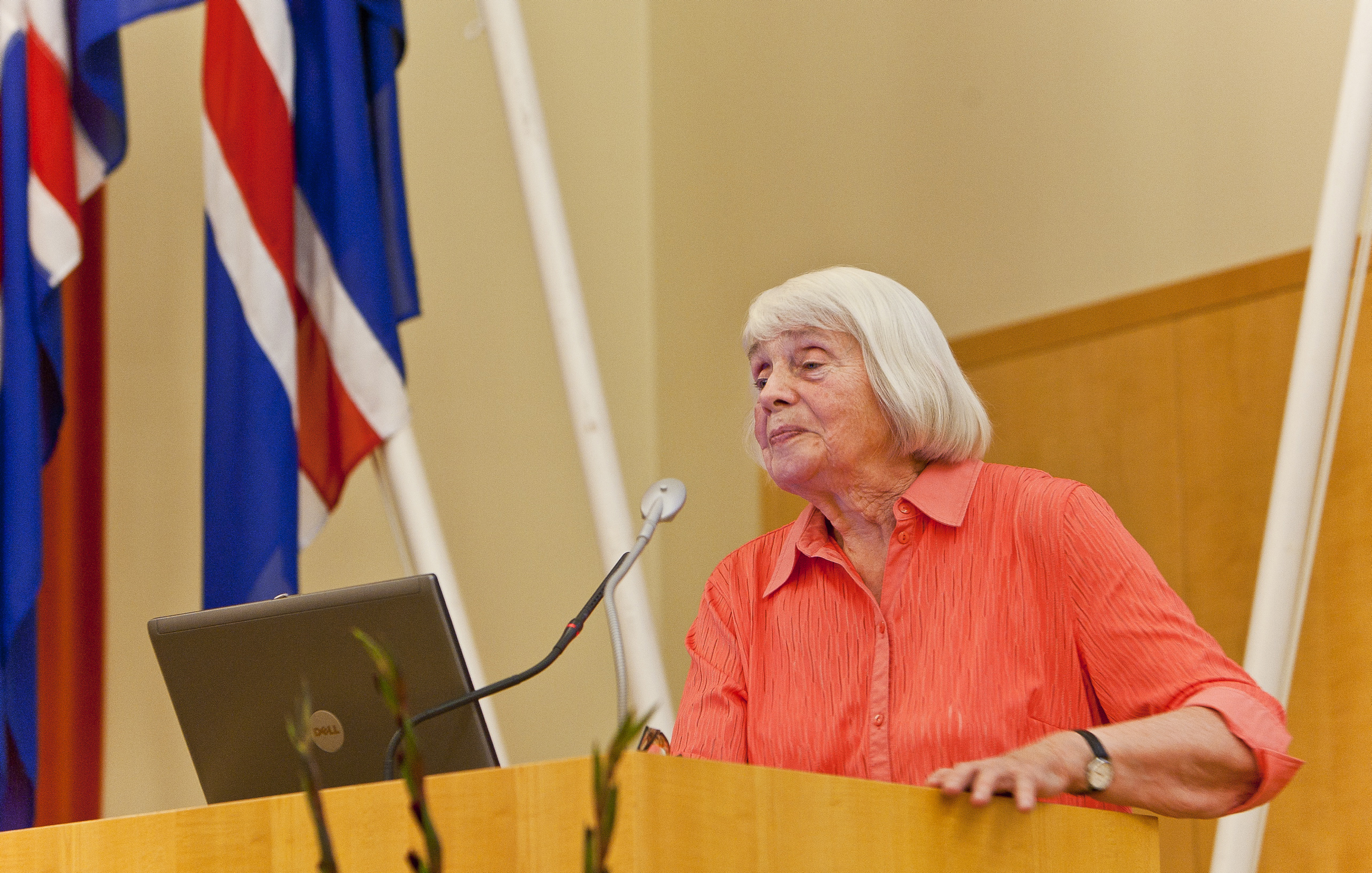
Margrét Guðnadóttir

Margrét Guðmunda Guðnadóttir (7 July 1929 – 2 January 2018) was an Icelandic doctor and virologist She was the first woman to become a professor at the University of Iceland.

== Career ==
Margrét completed her matriculation examination from the mathematics department at Menntaskólinn í Reykjavík in the spring of 1949. In the autumn, she enrolled as a medical student at the University of Iceland and graduated in the spring of 1956. During the summers of 1954 and 1955, she worked at the Keldur Institute for Experimental Pathology, researching pneumonia and the spread of the influenza epidemic. After graduating from the Faculty of Medicine in the spring of 1956, she worked for one year at Keldur. Her first project was to map the spread of the polio epidemic that hit Iceland in the autumn of 1955. This was part of the preparation work for the polio vaccination programme that began in the summer of 1957.

In the summer of 1957, Margrét went to the UK and the US under the auspices of Keldur to pursue a six-month specialist study programme in virology. In the UK she studied at the Central Public Health Laboratory in London, London School of Hygiene and in the US at the Communicable Disease Center in Montgomery, Alabama. She then enrolled on a two-year postgraduate programme in virology at Yale University in New Haven, Connecticut. There she conducted research into polio and the diagnosis of viral diseases in humans. From 1960 to 1969, Margrét worked as a specialist in virology at the Keldur Institute for Experimental Pathology, where she researched the visna-maedi virus and various human diseases. In 1969 she became a professor of medical microbiology at the University of Iceland Faculty of Medicine, the first female professor at the University. At this time, there were no female assistant professors or associate professors, but about nine women were employed as sessional teachers. Margrét worked as a professor for 30 years, until reaching retirement age in 1999. In 1974, Margrét established the University Research Institute in Virology at the Landspítali University Hospital, serving as director until 1994.

On 10 November 2011, on the centenary of the University of Iceland, Margrét was awarded an honorary doctorate from the University of Iceland Faculty of Medicine for her contribution to virology and the diagnosis of viral diseases.

Margrét's research focused on slow virus diseases in sheep, the nature of visna-maedi infections and a vaccination for this disease. She wrote many papers which were published in Icelandic and international outlets.
