= Hecataeus =

Hecataeus (Greek: Ἑκαταῖος) is a Greek name shared by several historical figures:

- Hecataeus of Miletus (born c. 550 BC), historian
- Hecataeus of the Sindi (r. c. 390-379), king of the Sindi people
- Hecataeus of Cardia (fl. 323 BC), tyrant of the city of Cardia
- Hecataeus of Abdera (born c. 300 BC), philosopher and historian
- Hecataeus of Eretria (born c. 300 BC), historian
- Hecataeus of Mytilene (born c. 100 BC), sculptor

== See also ==
- Hecataeus (beetle), a genus of insects in the family Chrysomelidae
- Hecataeus (crater), a large lunar impact crater near the eastern limb of the Moon
