= Adad-nirari =

Adad-nirari or Adad-narari may refer to one of the following ancient Near Eastern kings.

- Adad-nirari I of Assyria
- Adad-nirari II of Assyria
- Adad-nirari III of Assyria
- Adad-Nirari of Qatna
- Adad-Nirari of Nuhašše
