= Ashurnasirpal =

Ashurnasirpal may refer to:

- Ashurnasirpal I, king of Assyria from 1050 to 1031 BCE
- Ashurnasirpal II, king of Assyria from 884 to 859 BCE
