= Isho'yahb =

Isho'yahb may refer to:

- Isho'yahb I (fl. 581-596), patriarch
- Yeshuyab II (fl. 620-644), also Isho'yahb II of Gdala (628-45), Christian patriarch
- Ishoyahb III, (fl. 649-659), patriarch
- Isho'yahb IV (fl. 1020-1025)
- Isho'yahb V (fl. 1148-1176)
- Mar Eliyya XIII Isho-Yab (fl. 1778-1804)

Bishops in Adiabene (East Syrian Ecclesiastical Province)

- Ishoy'yahb of Shenna, contemporary of Isho'yahb II of Gdala
- Ishoʿyahb of Haditha, metropolitan of Mosul during the reign of the patriarch Mari (987–99)

== See also ==
- List of patriarchs of the Church of the East
