= Pula, Sardinia =

Pula
- Comune
- Comune di Pula
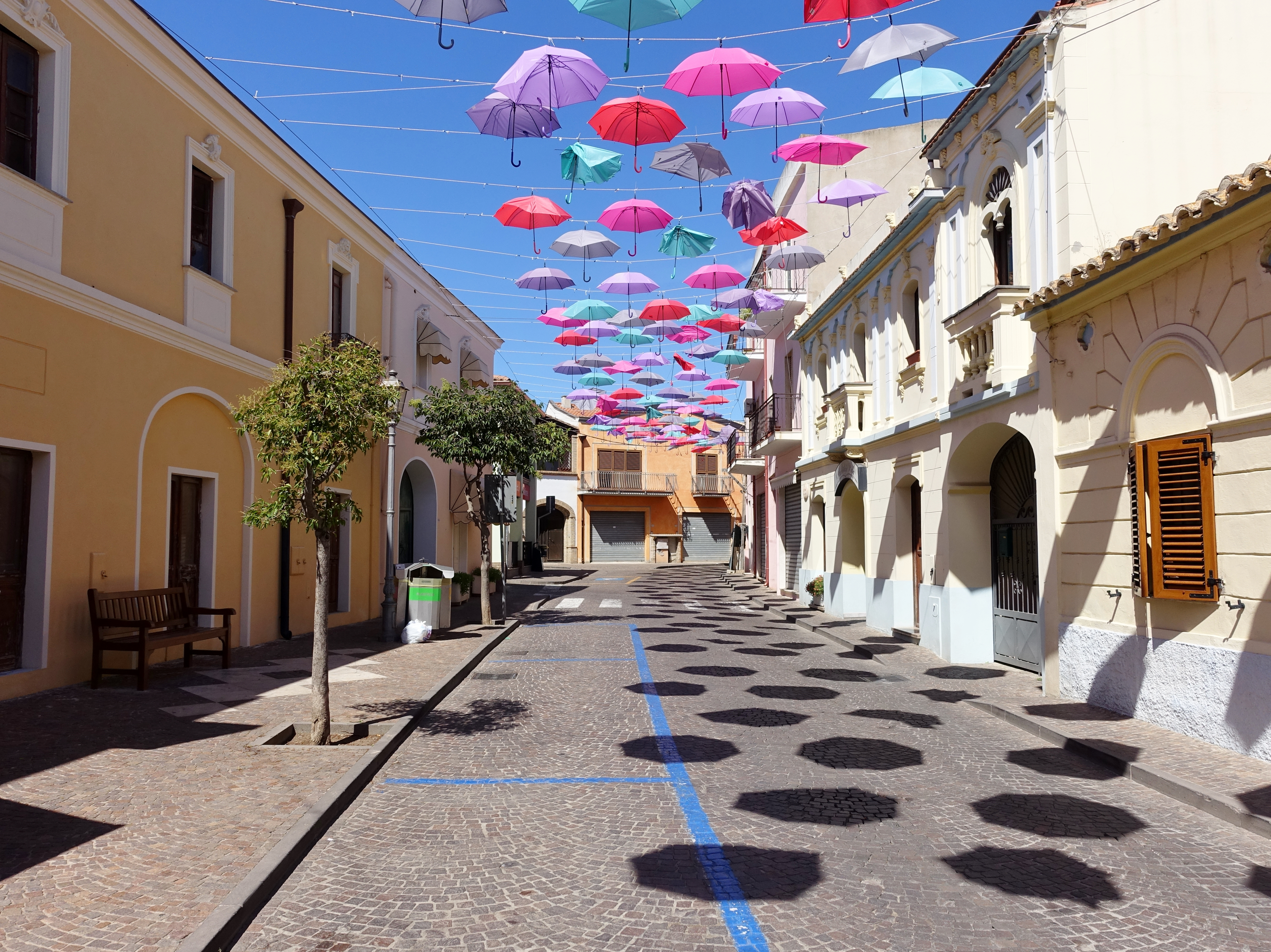

- Location within Sardinia
- Coordinates: 39°1′N 9°0′E
- Country: Italy
- Region: Sardinia
- Metropolitan city: Cagliari (CA)
- Frazioni: Santa Margherita di Pula, Is Molas

Government
  - Mayor: Walter Cabasino

Area
  - Total: 138.7 km^{2} (53.6 sq mi)
- Elevation: 10 m (33 ft)

Population (2025)
  - Total: 7,090
  - Density: 51.1/km^{2} (132/sq mi)
- Demonym: Pulesi
- Time zone: UTC+1 (CET)
  - Summer (DST): UTC+2 (CEST)
- Postal code: 09050
- Dialing code: 070
- Website: Official website

Pula (Latin: Nora) is a comune (municipality) in the Metropolitan City of Cagliari in the Italian region of Sardinia, located about 25 kilometres (16 mi) southwest of Cagliari. It has 7,090 inhabitants.

Pula is a holiday resort, with numerous hotels and beaches. The ruins of the ancient city of Nora are among the most important archaeological sites of the island.

== History ==
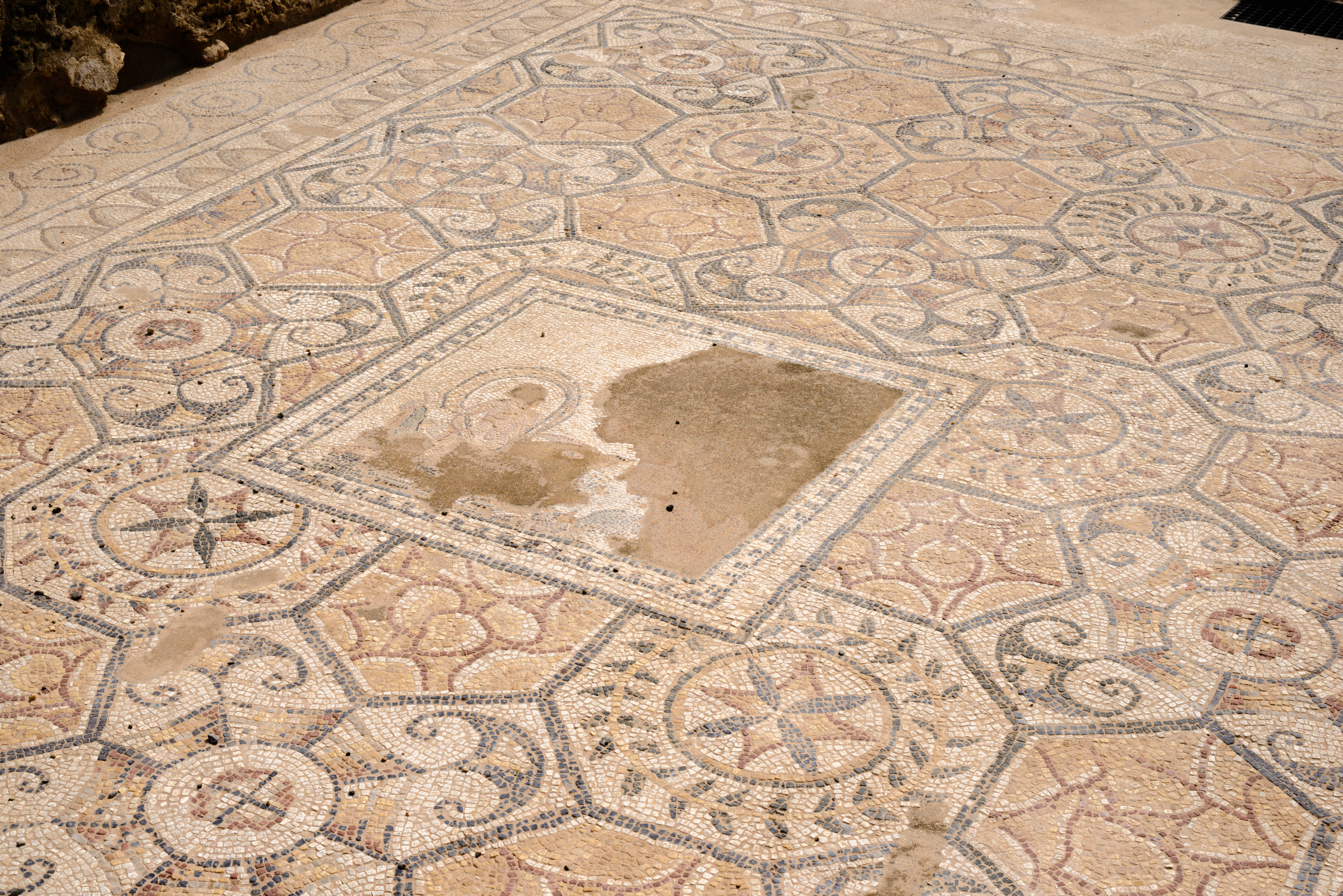
Roman mosaic

Pula is located near the ancient city of Nora. Nora was built by Phoenicians around the 8th century BC. There is evidence that Pula rose on a pre-existing Nuragic settlement or according, to legend, by Iberians brought to Sardinia by Norax.

In the following centuries, the city was ruled by the Carthaginians, and then by the Romans. The Romans made Nora the capital of Corsica and Sardinia for a short time, before giving the title to the nearby Caralis (modern Cagliari). After the fall of the Western Roman Empire, Nora, like many other Sardinian coastal cities, suffered continuous raids from the Vandals and later the Saracens, and eventually ceased to exist from about the 8th century AD.

Modern Pula appeared during the Middle Ages as a village called Padulis de Nura or Nora Marsh, which was part of the Giudicato of Cagliari. It was incorporated into the crown possessions of Aragon in 1355, after the death of Gherardo della Gherardesca the younger and was entrusted to various feudal lords. In the 18th century, there was a revival of agriculture, mainly due to agricultural reclamation promoted by religious groups, and then by the state. Agricultural reclamation intensified the development of olive and fruit growing.

== Demographics ==
Historical population

| Year | Pop. | ±% |
|---|---|---|
| 1861 | 1,700 | — |
| 1871 | 1,485 | −12.6% |
| 1881 | 1,668 | +12.3% |
| 1901 | 1,781 | +6.8% |
| 1911 | 1,964 | +10.3% |
| 1921 | 2,066 | +5.2% |
| 1931 | 2,131 | +3.1% |
| 1936 | 2,275 | +6.8% |

| Year | Pop. | ±% |
|---|---|---|
| 1951 | 2,611 | +14.8% |
| 1961 | 3,642 | +39.5% |
| 1971 | 4,770 | +31.0% |
| 1981 | 5,371 | +12.6% |
| 1991 | 5,857 | +9.0% |
| 2001 | 6,535 | +11.6% |
| 2011 | 7,141 | +9.3% |
| 2021 | 7,106 | −0.5% |

Source: ISTAT

== Sights ==
=== City center ===
The Giovanni Patroni Civic Museum, located on Corso Vittorio Emanuele in the heart of Pula, houses relics discovered during archaeological excavations of Nora. In the church of San Giovanni Battista (St. John the Baptist) are two marble sarcophagi, one of which contains the remains of the Duchess of St. Peter Agostina Deroma, who died in 1759. On the Piazza del Popolo is the Villa Santa Maria, designed by Gaetano Cima in the first half of the 19th century, and built on the ruins of an ancient church of the same name.

=== Nora ===
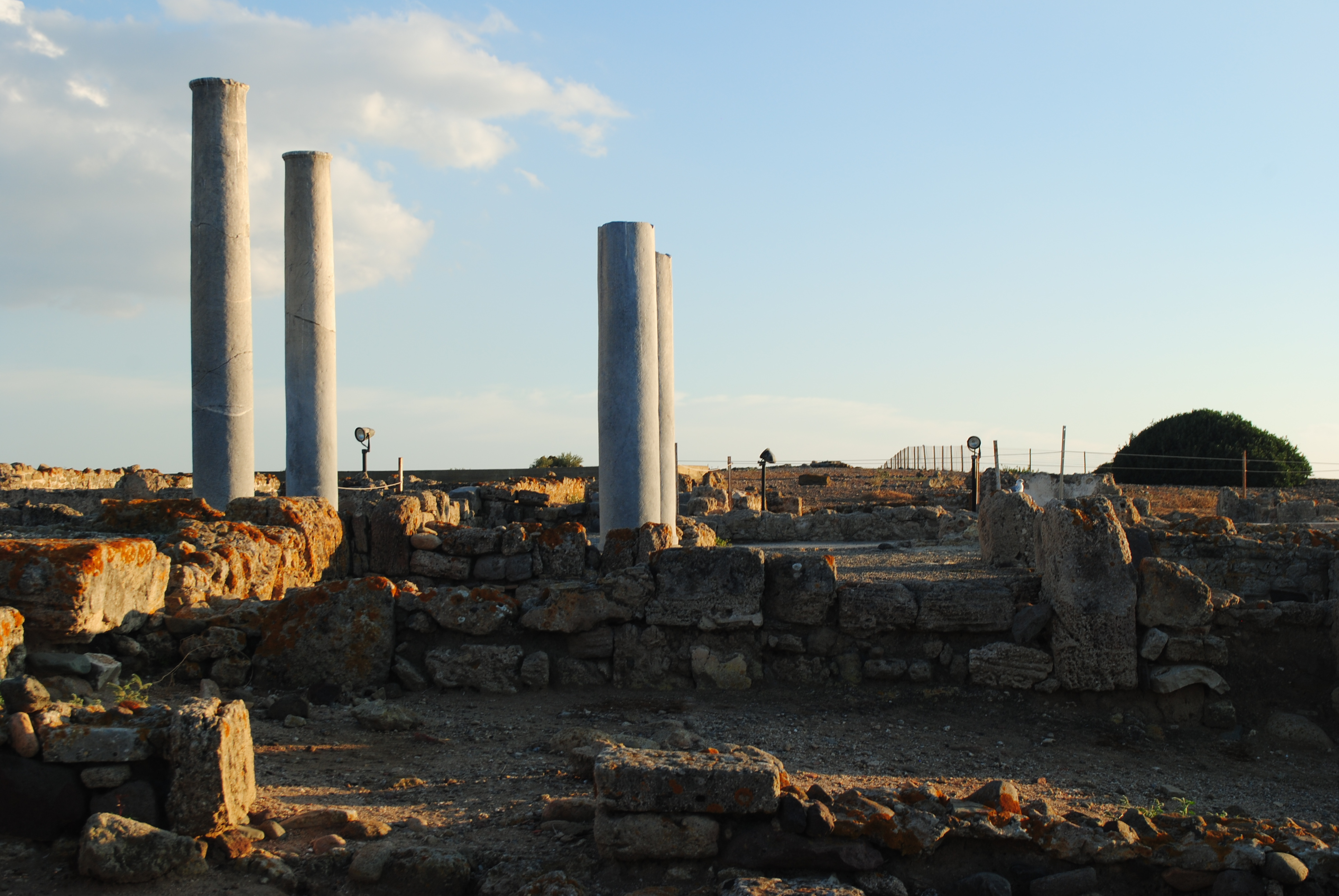
View of Nora.

On the Promontory of Capo di Pula are the ruins of the ancient city of Nora. The remains were discovered accidentally when a violent storm uncovered part of a funerary tophet. More discoveries followed; one of the most striking was a Roman theatre. Since its excavation, the theater has been used for occasional concerts during the summer.

Not far away a single column indicates a Roman temple and adjacent to it is a forum - the social and economic center of the city. A temple is dedicated to the goddess Tanit; the identity of the goddess was supported by the discovery of a stone pyramid. Another building appears to be a spa complex. The size of its ruins suggest that it was a very impressive structure.

=== Other sights ===
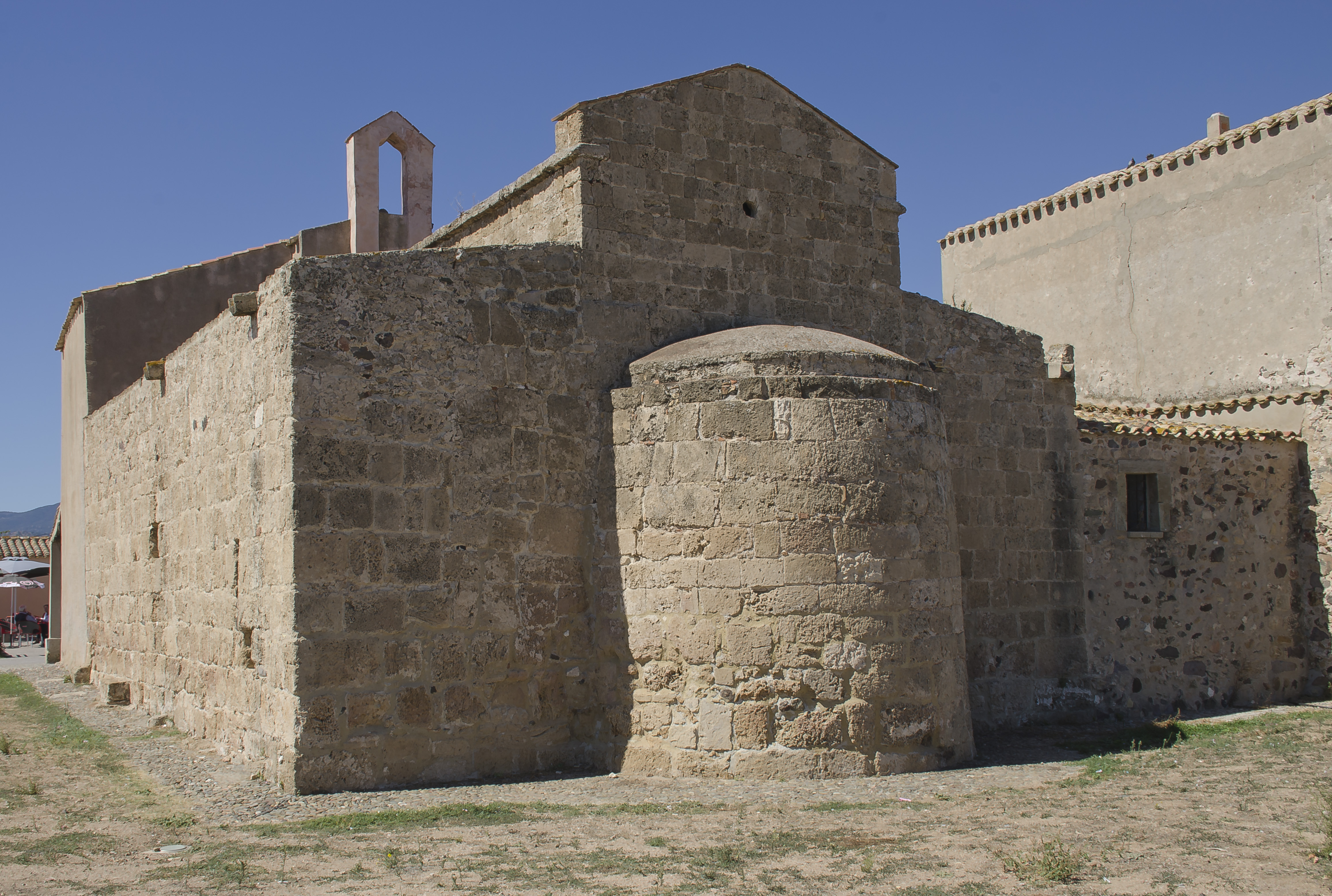
Church of Sant'Efisio.

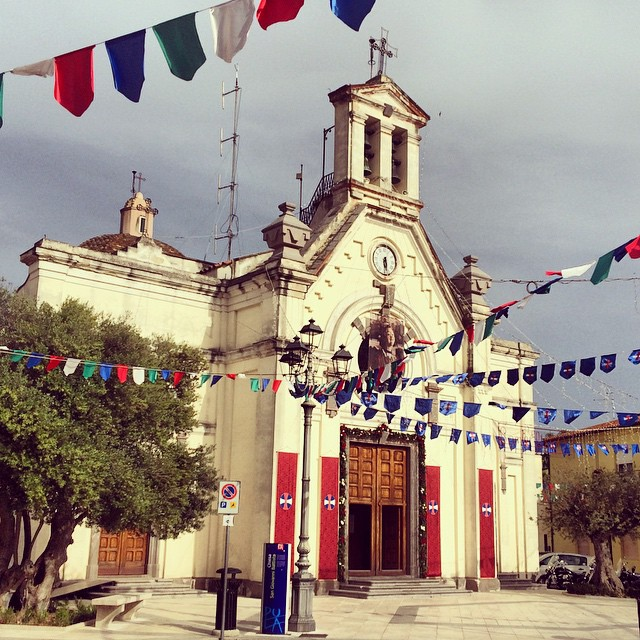
Church of San Giovanni Battista.

Just before the site of Nora, stands the church of Sant'Efisio (12th century). It was built in the place where the saint was martyred. At the foot of the sanctuary lies Guventeddu beach (from the Sardinian Guventeddu, meaning small convent).

The Center for Environmental Education is located at the Lagoon of Nora. This aquarium contains marine species that are most representative of the lagoon ecosystem. After the lagoon, along the coast road, are the beaches of Punta d' Agumu and Foxi 'e Sali.

The tourist village of Santa Margherita di Pula, now a frazione of the comune, initially grew around a church dedicated to the Holy Martyr. The large pine forest was planted in the postwar period, in conjunction with projects of agrarian transformation. Prior to the suspension of international tennis in March 2020 due to the COVID-19 coronavirus, the village also hosted regular ITF tournaments on the clay courts at the Forte Village Resort. Between Pula and Santa Margherita di Pula are campgrounds at Cala d'Ostia, and long beaches with a marina at Cala Verde.

== Culture ==
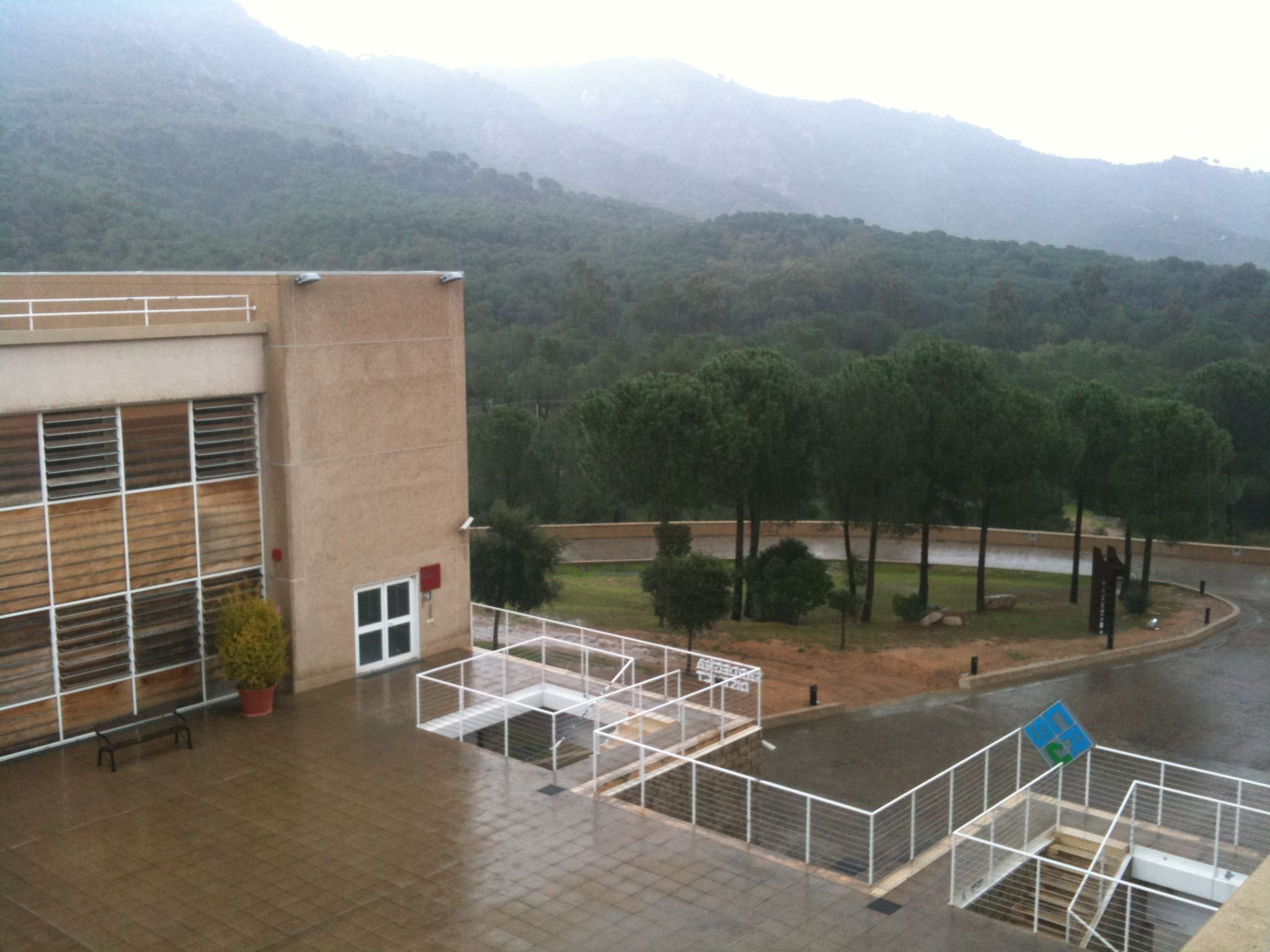
Polaris

Pula is home to Polaris, the Science and Technology Park of Sardinia, a multidisciplinary research center that focuses on biomedicine, data fusion, energy and environment, and the information society. With more than 60 companies and research centers, Polaris is one of the largest science parks in Italy.

Schools in Pula include the Alberghiera School, the Wiseword English School, and a Trinity Centre for international qualifications.

== See also ==
- Piscinamanna valley
