= CRS4 =

Coordinates: 38.9901°N 8.9358°E

CRS4, also known as Center for Advanced Studies, Research and Development in Sardinia (Italian: Centro di Ricerca, Sviluppo e Studi Superiori in Sardegna), is an interdisciplinary research center, founded by the Sardinia Autonomous Region on November 30, 1990. Since 2003, the center is located in the Technology Park of Sardinia, in the Comune of Pula. Several companies and research groups have chosen to establish their activities on this campus, giving rise to a thriving R&D community.

CRS4 is a private research center, but its shareholder is a regional agency: Sardegna Ricerche.

The center, initially headed by the Nobel Prize in Physics Carlo Rubbia (1990 to 1999), has had the following Presidents: Nicola Cabibbo (2000 to 2003), Carlo Rubbia (2003 to 2006), Paolo Zanella (2006 to 2014), Luigi Filippini (2014 to 2017), Annalisa Bonfiglio (2017 to 2020). Giacomo Cao, Sole Administrator (2020).

A young graduate student, Antonio Ticca, during his stage at CRS4 made the first Italian Website (www.crs4.it) in August 1993 (this is the real date, not the one cited in the press article), and with Francesco Ruggiero collaborated to the creation of the first European web newspaper in 1994 (L'Unione Sarda) and to one of the first and largest internet providers (Video On Line). In this sense CRS4 has been crucial for the development of the Internet and Web in Sardinia and Italy.

Today about 150 researchers are working at CRS4 and the 6 main strategic research sectors are:

- Biosciences
- Computational Infrastructure and Smart Projects
- Digital Technologies for Aerospace
- HPC for Energy and Environment
- ICT - Information Society
- Visual and Data-Intensive Computing

CRS4 is one of the major Italian Computing Centers and is equipped with the first Genotyping and massive DNA Sequencing Platform in Italy

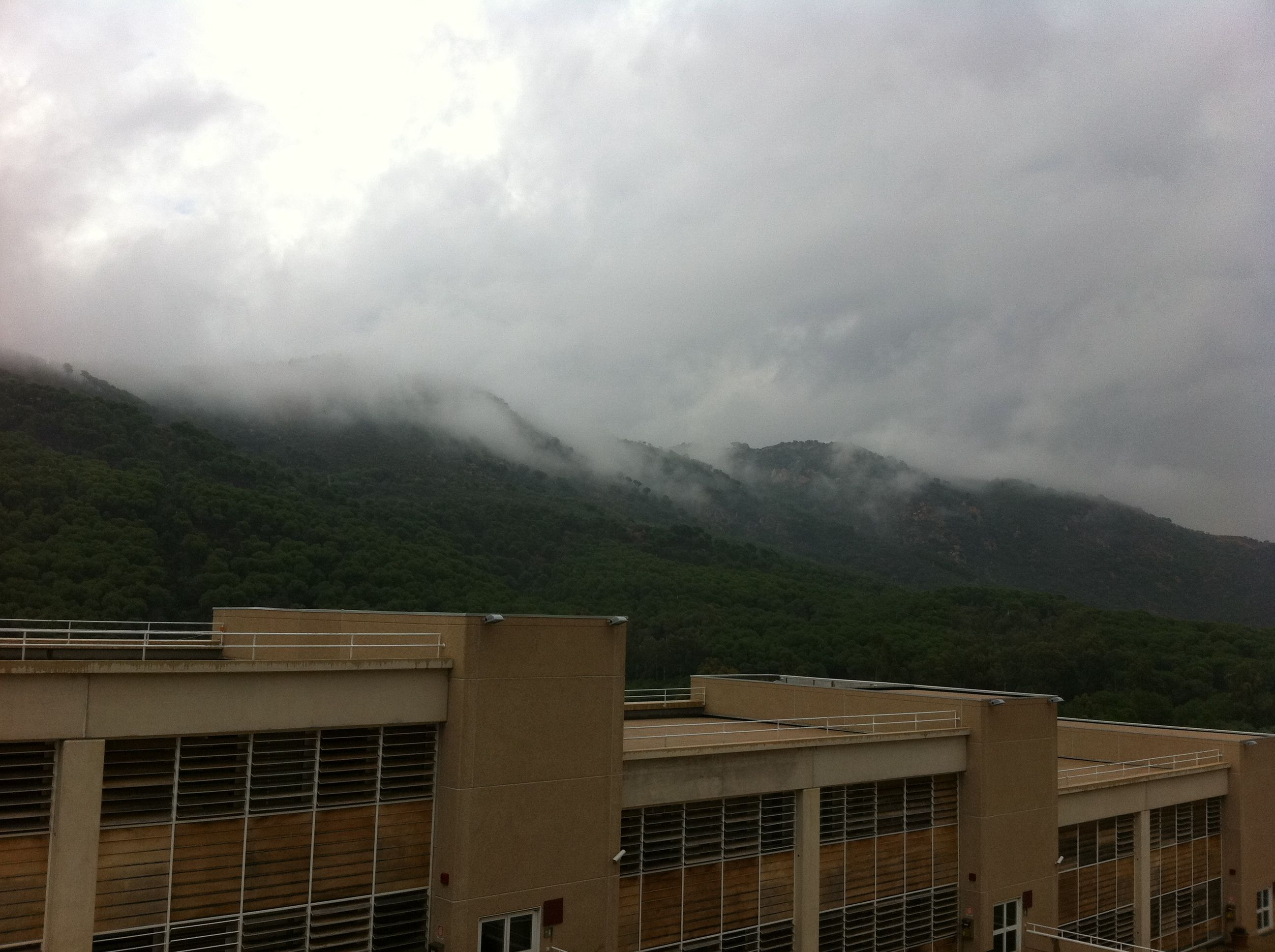

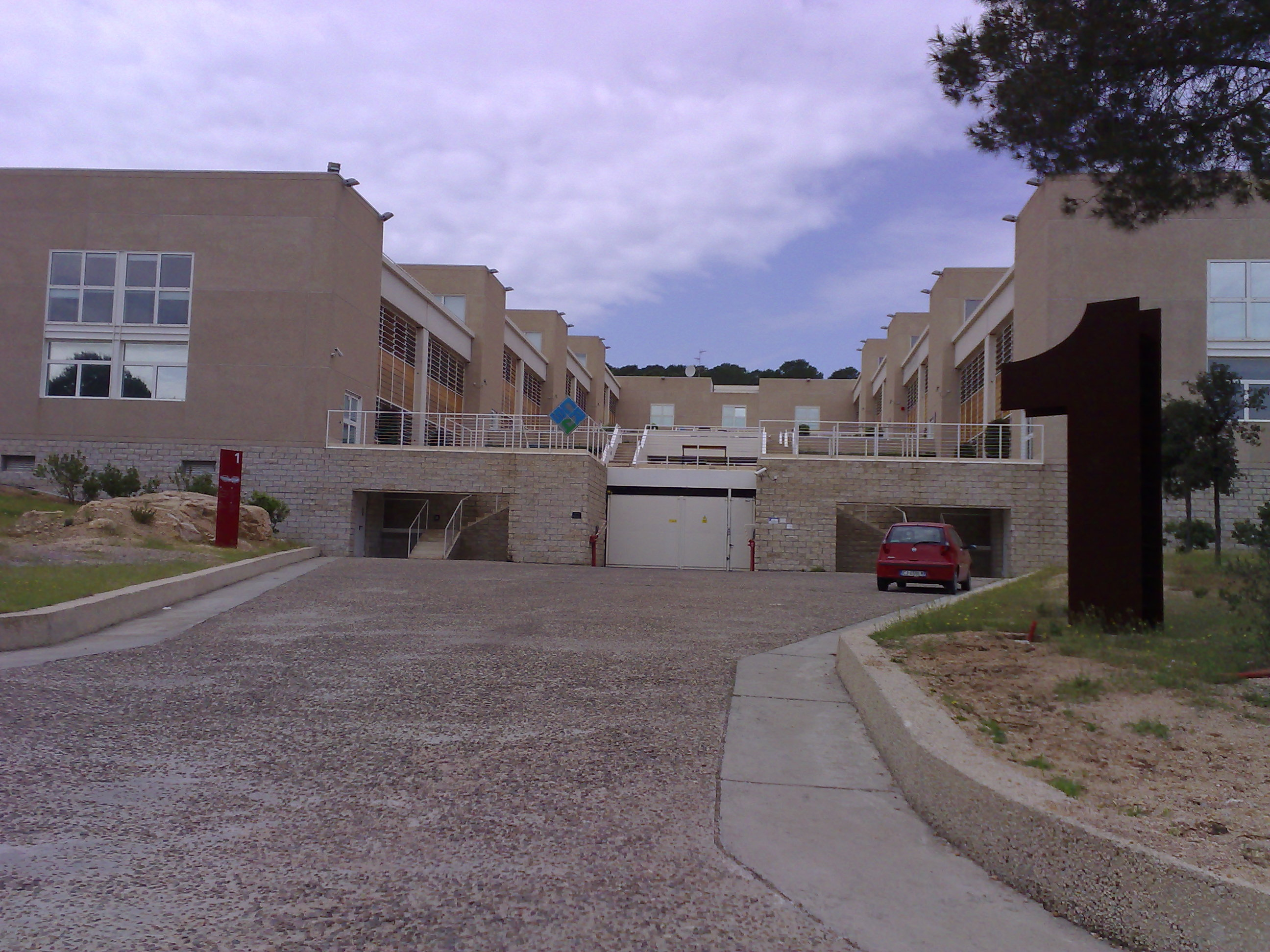
