= Oswine =

Oswine is an Anglo-Saxon male name. It may refer to:

- Saint Oswine of Deira (killed 651)
- Oswine of Kent (floruit circa 690)
