= Hermesianax =

Hermesianax (Ancient Greek: Ἑρμησιάναξ) was a Greek masculine name. Notable people with this name were:

- Hermesianax (poet), an elegiac poet from Colophon
- Hermesianax of Tralles, his three daughters were champions and he erected a monument at Delphi for them
- Hermesianax, a wrestler from Colophon
- Hermesianax, a historian from Cyprus
