= Athenagoras of Miletus =

Ancient Greek general

Athenagoras (Ancient Greek: Ἀθηναγόρας, fl. 4th century BCE) of Miletus was a general of ancient Greece who was sent by the Macedonian ruler Ptolemy I Soter at the head of some mercenary troops to the assistance of the Rhodians, when they were attacked by Demetrius I Poliorcetes in 305 BCE, and commanded the guard of the counter-mine which was dug by the Rhodians.

Demetrius attempted to bribe him, but Athenagoras disclosed his overtures to the Rhodians, and enabled them to take prisoner an officer of high rank in the service of Demetrius, named Alexander.
