= Muhibbul Haque Gachbari =

Bangladeshi Islamic Scholar

Shaykhul Hadith, Maulana Muhibbul Haque Gachbari Huzur
- মুহিব্বুল হক গাছবাড়ী

Central Naib e Amir, Hefazat-e-Islam Bangladesh
- In office 7 June 2021 – 17 May 2023

4th Principal of Jamea Qasimul Uloom Dargah E Hajrat ShahJalal (R). Sylhet
- In office 12 March 2019 – 17 May 2023
- Preceded by: Mufti Abul Kalam Zakaria
- Succeeded by: Maulana Masukuddin Borobari

Examination Controller, Azad Deene Edarah Taleem Bangladesh
- In office 3 June 2019 – 17 May 2023
- Preceded by: Maulana Shihab Uddin
- Succeeded by: Maulana Yousuf Khadimani

Personal life
- Born: 6 December 1945 Gachbari, Kanaighat, Sylhet
- Died: 17 May 2023 (aged 77)
- Education: Darul Uloom Hathazari
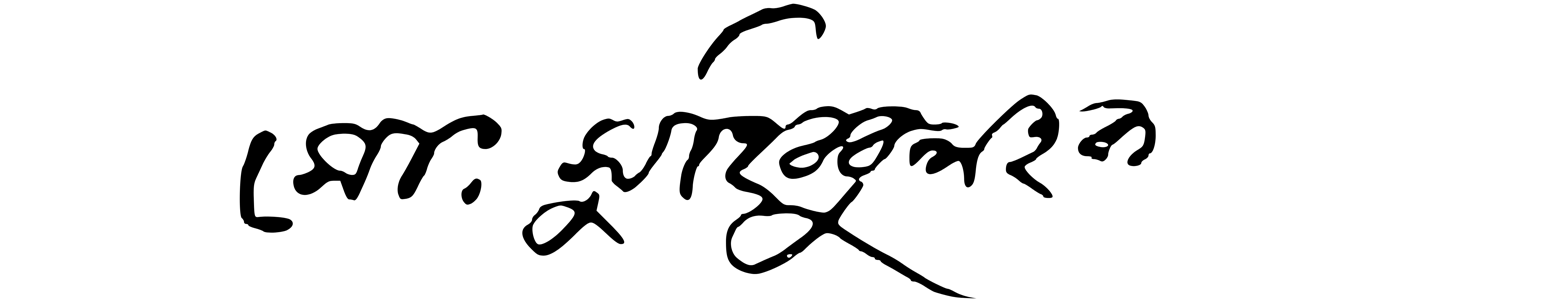
- Signature

Religious life
- Religion: Islam
- Jurisprudence: Hanafi
- Creed: Maturidi
- Movement: Deobandi movement

Muslim leader
- Teacher: Mushahid Ahmad Bayampuri Shah Ahmad Shafi

Muhibbul Haque (6 December 1945 – 17 May 2023), also known as Gachbari Huzur, was a Bangladeshi Deobandi Islamic scholar, Shaykhul Hadith, Educationist and spiritual personality. He was the Muhtamim (Principal) and Shaykhul Hadith of Jamea Qasimul Uloom Dorgah Hazrat Shahjalal, the central Naib e Amir(Vice president) of Hefazat-e-Islam Bangladesh, a member of Al-Haiatul Ulya Lil-Jamiatil Qawmia Bangladesh and also member of its Examination Control Committee. In addition, he worked as the main Examination Controller of Azad Deeni Edara-e-Taleem Bangladesh and was the lifelong president of Ulama Parishad Bangladesh and Khadimul Quran Parishad Bangladesh, He also served as the Ameer (President) of the Hefazat-e-Islam Bangladesh Sylhet District Committee. For his contributions to religious education and various social welfare activities, he was awarded the 'Ragib Rabeya Foundation Ekushey Honor' in 2022.

== Early life and education ==
Haque was born on 6 December 1945 into a Muslim family in Gachbari village under Kanaighat upazila in Sylhet district. His father, Ishaq, was an Islamic scholar in Kanaighat region.

== Professional life and career ==
His professional career began in 1969 through teaching at Sunamganj Dargahpur Madrasah. After that, from 1973, he was appointed as a teacher at Jamea Qasimul Uloom Dorgah Hazrat Shahjalal Madrasah, Sylhet. He served as the Sheikhul Hadith, Education Secretary, and Head of Teachers at Dorgah Madrasah. On 11 March 2019, following the passing of the principal, Mufti Abul Kalam Zakaria, he was nominated as the 4th principal of Dorgah Madrasah based on the decision of the Shura Council. He continued in this role until his death.

== Awards and honours ==
He obtained the "Ragib-Rabeya Foundation Ekushey Award 2022" for his unique contribution to religious education and playing a significant role in various social welfare activities.

== Death ==
On the evening of 17 May 2023 (Wednesday), He had a stroke while at his workplace, Dorgah Madrasah. He was straight away taken to Sylhet M.A.G. Osmani Medical College Hospital, where he died around 7:30 PM. The following day, after the Zuhr prayer, his funeral prayer was organised at the historic Shahi Eidgah ground in Sylhet, with millions of people attending. His elder son, Enamul Haque Junaid, led the prayer. After the funeral, he was buried in the cemetery in front of the Darul Ikama building of Jamea Qasimul Uloom Dorgah Hazrat Shahjalal.

== See also ==
- List of Deobandis
