= Harvey Yunis =

American Classicist

- Occupation: Andrew W. Mellon Professor of Classics

Education
- Education: Dartmouth, BA 1978 Cambridge, BA (Jesus College) 1982 Harvard, PhD 1987

Philosophical work
- Institutions: Rice University
- Notable works: Aristotle: The Art of Rhetoric

Harvey Yunis is an American classicist and the Andrew W. Mellon Professor of Classics at Rice University. He is an eminent scholar of Greek rhetoric, tragedy, and political thought. He has taught at Rice University since 1987.

== Education ==
Yunis graduated summa cum laude from Dartmouth College in 1978. In 1982, he earned a BA from Cambridge University at Jesus College in the Classical Tripos with first class honours. He earned his PhD in Classical Philology from Harvard University in 1987 writing his dissertation on "Athenian Polis Religion and Euripides: Fundamental Religious Beliefs in Life and Fiction." His doctoral advisor was Albert Henrichs, the Eliot Professor of Greek Literature at Harvard.

== Career ==
Initially focusing on Religion in Euripidian tragedies, Yunis turned his focus to Ancient Greek political thought. He published works on law and politics in 4th century Athens. He then focused on rhetoric, examining rhetoric's function in the Athenian polis and how it shaped law and customs. He was a Fellow in Hellenic Studies at The Center for Helenic Studies in 1993–1994, producing To Instruct and Persuade: Rhetoric and Political Theory in Classical Athens. Apart from commentaries, he has also published numerous translations of classical works including Plato's Phaedrus and Demosthenes' On the Crown. In the early 2000s, the original fragments from On the Crown, were sent to him to be studied through a process of philological, historical and literary analysis. These recently discovered papyrus fragments constitute the earliest available evidence for the text and are only about 80 to 100 years removed from the original composition, which is a rare phenomenon for any classical author. He also co-authored a translation of Aristotle's Rhetoric with Robin Waterfield in 2018.

Apart from his scholarly career, Yunis was also the Chair of the Department of Classical Studies at Rice University for ten years.

== Books ==
- Ed., Albert Henrichs, Greek Myth and Religion: Collected Papers II (Berlin: De Gruyter, 2019).
- Ed. and trans. with Robin Waterfield, Aristotle: The Art of Rhetoric (Oxford: Oxford University Press, 2018).
- Plato: Phaedrus (Cambridge: Cambridge University Press, 2011).
- Demosthenes, Speeches 18-19: On the Crown and On the Dishonest Embassy (Austin: University of Texas Press, 2005).
- Ed., Written Texts and the Rise of Literate Culture in Ancient Greece (Cambridge: Cambridge University Press, 2003). Paperback edition 2007.
- Demosthenes: On the Crown (Cambridge: Cambridge University Press, 2001).
- Taming Democracy: Models of Political Rhetoric in Classical Athens (Ithaca, NY: Cornell University Press, 1996).
- A New Creed: Fundamental Religious Beliefs in the Athenian Polis and Euripidean Drama (Göttingen: Vandenhoeck & Ruprecht, 1988).
