= Athenagoras (physician) =

Ancient Greek physician

Athenagoras (Ancient Greek: Ἀθηναγόρας) was a physician of ancient Greece or ancient Rome. His time is unknown. Some scholars date him to between 400 and 600 CE, but others date him to earlier, pre-Christian times.

He wrote a treatise On the Pulse and on Urine, of which there was an extant manuscript in Latin (Incipit liber Athenagore de pulsis et urinis, Quoniam medicus peritissimus debet esse...) in the 11th century CE at the Royal Library at Paris (now the Bibliothèque nationale de France). While this manuscript is in Latin, it is assumed from the author's name that they originally wrote in Greek and the Latin is a later translation.

Some bronze coins struck at Smyrna in honor of a person named Athenagoras were thought by the doctor and medical writer Richard Mead to refer to the physician of this name; but this is now generally considered to be a mistake.

A work on agriculture by a person of the same name is mentioned by the writers Marcus Terentius Varro and Columella, and may be the same Athenagoras as this (though would necessarily date him to the 1st century BCE or earlier, and imply the dates of 400 to 600 CE would be radically incorrect).
