= Abiel (biblical figures) =

Abiel (Hebrew: אֲבִיאֵל, lit. 'my father [is] God') was the name of two individuals mentioned in the Hebrew Bible:

- Son of Zeror, of the tribe of Benjamin: he was the grandfather of King Saul and of his commander Abner (1 Samuel 9:1).
- An Arbathite; one of King David's warriors known for his bravery.
