= Capo Carbonara Lighthouse =

Lighthouse in Sardinia, Italy

Capo Carbonara
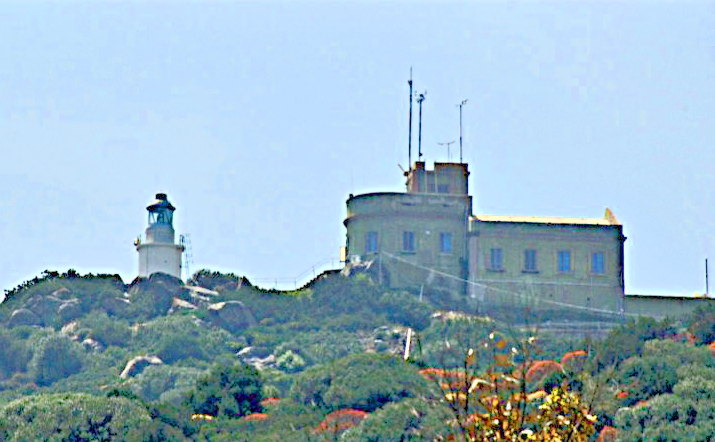
- Capo Carbonara Lighthouse
- Location: Capo Carbonara; Villasimius; Sardinia; Italy
- Coordinates: 39°06′13″N 9°30′50″E

Tower
- Constructed: 1917 (first)
- Foundation: masonry base
- Construction: masonry tower
- Automated: yes
- Height: 5 metres (16 ft)
- Shape: cylindrical tower with balcony and lantern
- Markings: white tower, grey lantern dome
- Power source: mains electricity
- Operator: Marina Militare
- Fog signal: no

Light
- First lit: 1974 (current)
- Focal height: 120 metres (390 ft)
- Lens: Type OR S2 Bivalva
- Intensity: main: AL 1000 W reserve: LABI 100 W
- Range: main: 23 nautical miles (43 km; 26 mi) reserve: 18 nautical miles (33 km; 21 mi)
- Characteristic: FI W 7.5 s.
- Italy no.: 1258 E.F.

Capo Carbonara Lighthouse (Italian: Faro di Capo Carbonara) is a light situated at the extremity of the granite promontory of Capo Carbonara, in the comune of Villasimius, on the eastern side of Gulf of Cagliari inside the Marine protected area of Capo Carbonara.

== Description ==
The place, for its position, hosted several defensive towers as Fortezza Vecchia built by the Aragonesi, the tower of Porto Giunco built in 1580 and the small tower light of Capo Carbonara built in 1578. The first lighthouse was built in 1917 and was described as a skeletal tower; the current was built in 1974 and is placed on the top of the Cape at 120 metres. The lighthouse is formed by a masonry cylindrical tower 5 metres (16 ft) high, white painted with balcony and lantern adjacent to the two-story keeper's house. The lighthouse is active and managed by Marina Militare, it is fully automated and the optics is an OR S2 type with a focal length of 250 mm; the lantern emits a single white flashing in a 7.5 seconds period visible up to 23 nautical miles (43 km; 26 mi) of distance.

== See also ==
- List of lighthouses in Italy
