= MV Loredan =

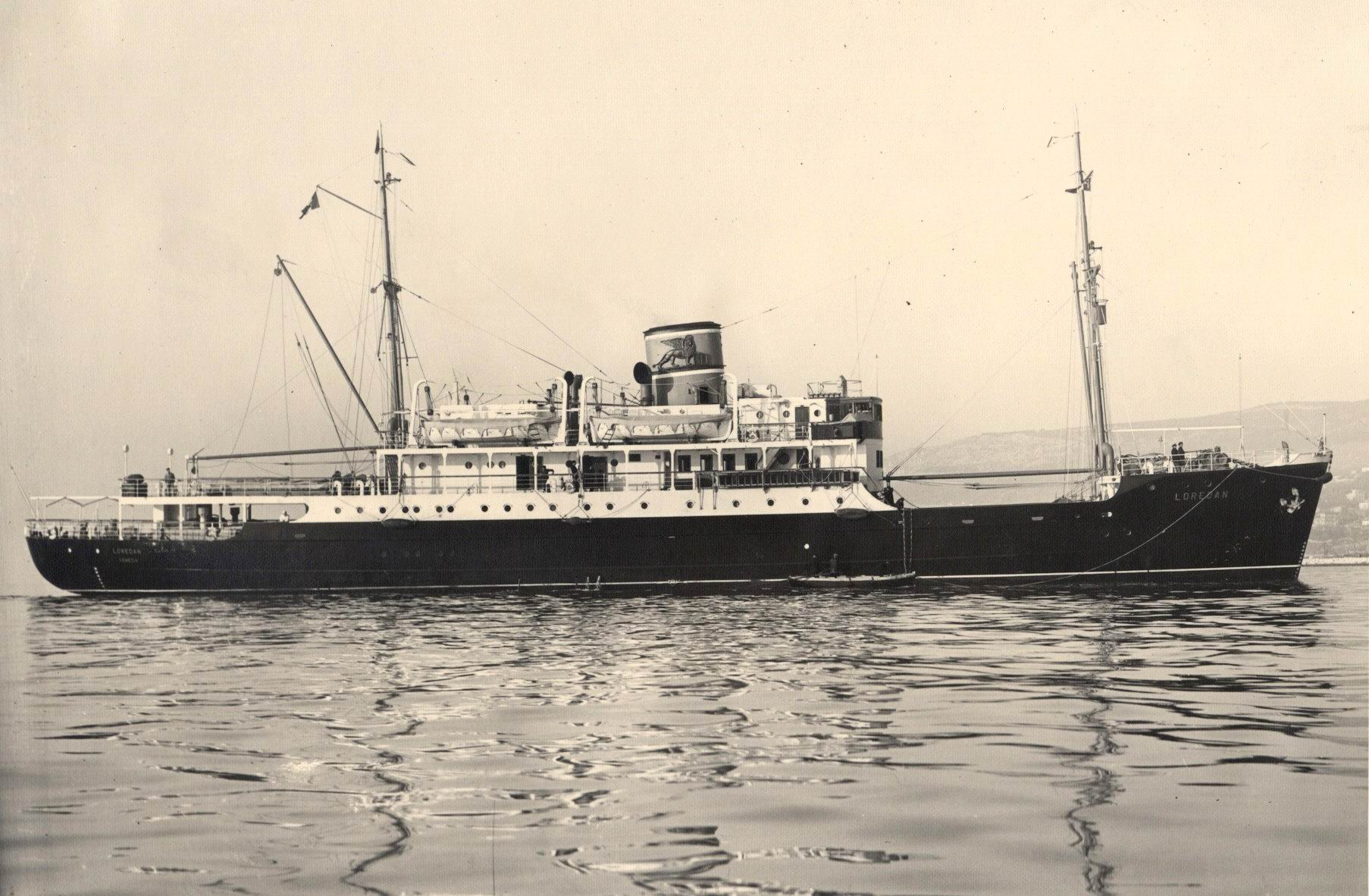
- Loredan with a winged Lion of Saint Mark, a symbol of the Venetian Republic, visible on the funnel.

History

Kingdom of Italy
- Namesake: House of Loredan
- Owner: Adr. S.A. di Navigazione (1936–1941); Regia Marina (1941–1943)
- Builder: Cantieri Riuniti dell'Adriatico
- Launched: 5 September 1936
- Out of service: 1943
- Home port: Port of Venice
- Fate: Torpedoed and sunk 10 April 1943

General characteristics
- Type: Auxiliary cruiser
- Tonnage: 1,357 GRT; 626 NRT
- Length: 72.17 m (236 ft 9 in) LOA; 67.18 m (220 ft 5 in) LPP
- Speed: 14 knots (26 km/h; 16 mph) (sustained sea speed)
- Capacity: 28 in first class

MV Loredan was an Italian mixed motor ship and auxiliary cruiser of the Italian Royal Navy in World War II, named in honor of the many admirals of the noble Loredan family of Venice.

Built in 1936 in Monfalcone, it initially served as a civil transport ship on several passenger/cargo lines in the Adriatic Sea. In 1941 the vessel was re-registered as an auxiliary cruiser in the Italian Royal Navy. In twenty-one months of service, it carried out a total of 193 missions, consisting mainly of escort services in the Tyrrhenian Sea. On 10 April 1943, Loredan left the port of Cagliari as an escort to a small convoy headed for the archipelago of La Maddalena. Shortly after the departure, the convoy was spotted by the British submarine HMS Safari, which proceeded to launch torpedoes at the Italian ships, sinking Loredan with nearly all its crew.

The wreck of Loredan lies on its left side, with the stern severely damaged, at a depth of between 52 and 67 meters (171 and 220 ft), on the seabed of the Gulf of Cagliari, at 39°08' N and 9°23' E. The wreck is a frequent diving destination.

== History ==
=== Construction and civil use ===
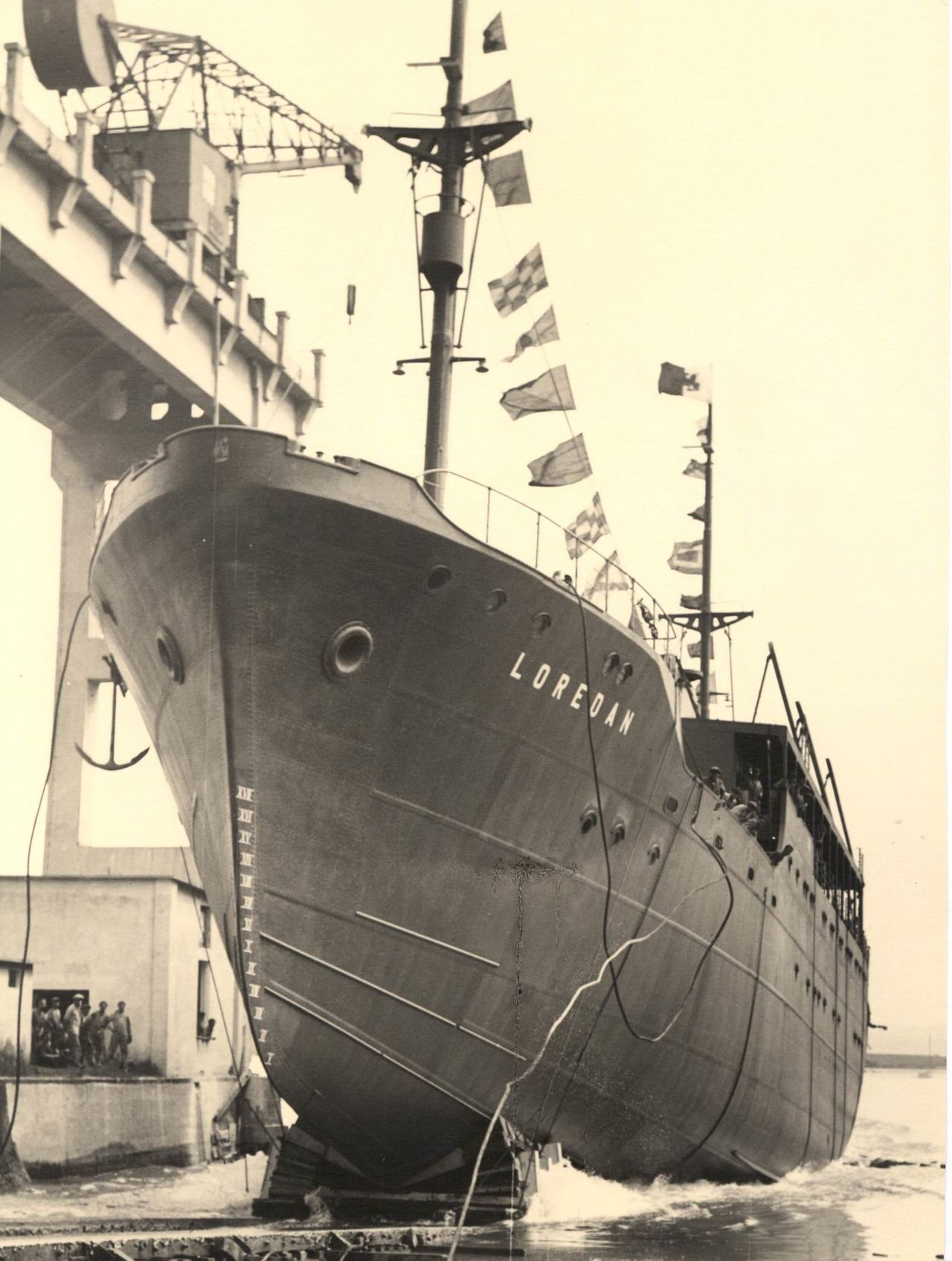
The launch of Loredan at the Monfalcone shipyards on 5 September 1936

Built between November 1935 and November 1936 at the Cantieri Riuniti dell'Adriatico in Monfalcone some time after its twin ship Narenta (built at Ancona), the vessel was originally a small mixed motor ship of 1,357 gross register tons (GRT) and 626 net register tons (NRT). Two holds with a capacity of 1,212 cubic meters (42,800 cu ft) allowed a deadweight of 583 (in other sources 650) tons, while the cabins could accommodate a total of 28 passengers, all in first class. A FIAT diesel engine with a power of 1,600–1,800 horsepower (1,200–1,300 kW) (in some sources 2,200 hp, 1,600 kW), consuming 6.6 tons of fuel per day, powered a propeller, allowing a speed of 13.5–14 knots (25.0–25.9 km/h; 15.5–16.1 mph) (the initially expected speed was instead of 14.6 knots, 27.0 km/h, 16.8 mph).

Registered with registration number 290 at the Maritime Compartment of Venice, the ship belonged to the Compagnia Adriatica di Navigazione, which on 1 January 1937 renamed as the Adriatica Società Anonima di Navigazione, based in Venice.

Initially used on line 45 with stops traveling between Venice-Trieste-Fiume-Bari, Loredan subsequently sailed also on lines 44, from Bari to Durrës, 42, from Venice to Durrës and Bari and vice versa, passing through Dalmatia, and 46, from Manfredonia to Bari. On 1 February 1940 the motor ship was laid up in Venice, remaining there until 11 April of that year. Rearmed on 12 April, the ship resumed service on line 44 for about a month; then, from May 1940, it operated on the basis of provisions of the Ministry of the Navy, making extraordinary transport journeys on behalf of the government, alternating with moments of rest and partial decommissioning.

=== Military use in the Royal Italian Navy ===
On 27 July 1941 Loredan was requisitioned at Barletta by the Regia Marina and registered in the role of auxiliary ship of the State with registration number D 19, classified as an auxiliary cruiser. Armed with two 102-millimetre (4.0 in)/45-caliber guns, four 20 mm (0.79 in)/65 guns and embarked two anti-submarine bomber aircraft equipped with a stock of 21 depth charges (other sources mention 20–21 mines), the vessel was used for escorting convoys and transporting materials on secondary and less dangerous routes. The journalist Vittorio Giovanni Rossi was also on board Loredan, as a war correspondent (Rossi recounted this experience in the 1941 book The War of the Sailors).

In twenty-one months of service as an auxiliary cruiser, Loredan carried out a total of 193 missions, consisting mainly of escort services on the routes that connected Sardinia to Civitavecchia.

==== Encounter with HMS Safari and sinking ====
At four in the afternoon on 10 April 1943, Loredan left the port of Cagliari as an escort to a small convoy headed for the archipelago of La Maddalena and formed by the military tanker Isonzo and the old steamship Entella, loaded with 3,500 tons of coal. The auxiliary cruiser proceeded at the head of the convoy, followed by Entella and Isonzo, alongside which also sailed the small tug-minesweeper RD 29, another unit of the escort. Off Capo Boi, MAS 507 joined the escort, after carrying out an unsuccessful hydrophone listening made problematic by the transit of the motor-sailer V 197 Idria. An anti-submarine reconnaissance squadron from the 188th Base Squadron at Elmas Airport, charged with patrolling the area in search of enemy underwater units, had to return early due to an engine failure, while an anti-submarine seaplane appointed to air escort the convoy remained on the ground due to starter engine failure.

Shortly after the departure the ships were spotted by the Royal Navy submarine HMS Safari, which, after having maneuvered to approach and take a position suitable for attack, around 18:20h (in other sources at 18h or 18:25h) launched four torpedoes at the convoy, and then quickly dived underwater and moved away. The Italian units had just crossed paths with the tug-minesweeper RD 41 one mile (1.6 km) across Torre Finocchio (or Torre delle Stelle) when torpedo wakes were spotted from aboard the latter. Struck at the stern by one of the weapons at 18:20, Loredan sank within a few seconds, 12 miles (19 km) at 100° from Punta Elia, not far from Cagliari, taking almost all of the crew with it. Even Isonzo, hit by a torpedo under the bridge and another in the stern, sank more slowly with the loss of 22 men, while Entella avoided a torpedo but ended up running aground near the coast (according to another source it was hit and led aground to avoid sinking).

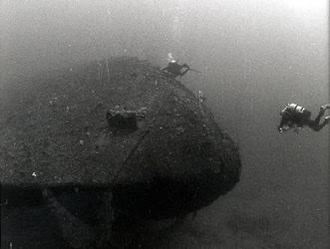
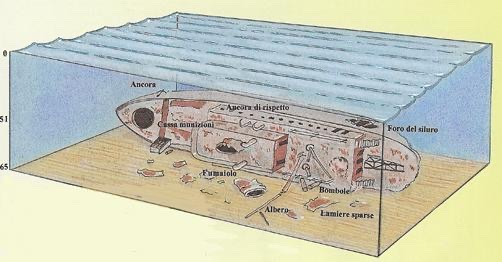
Exploration of the shipwreck and an illustration depicting the ship lying on its left side.

RD 29, RD 41 and MAS 507, then joined by Idria, carried out intense but unsuccessful anti-submarine hunts (being reached in the final stages also by a seaplane), believing they had sunk the enemy, while in reality Safari remained for several hours stuck on the seabed, and finally managed to free itself and move away.

Some survivors of the two sunken ships, despite the rough sea, reached the shore by swimming, others were recovered by the escort units and then loaded onto trucks and taken to Cagliari.

The following day, at eleven o'clock, Safari, back at the spot of the initial attack, also sank Entella with two torpedoes, which was being lifted off the grounding site with the use of tugs, divers and naval engineers. The submarine again evaded the hunt, conducted in this case by MAS 507 and MAS 510 and by a seaplane, and stopped at 17:50h after the supposed, but failed, sinking of the opposing unit.

The wreck of Loredan lies on its left side, with the stern severely damaged, at a depth of between 52 and 67 meters (171 and 220 ft), on the seabed of the Gulf of Cagliari, at 39°08' N and 9°23' E. The wreck is a frequent diving destination.
