= Solanas =

- Frazione
- Location of Solanas in Italy
- Coordinates: 39°08′14″N 9°25′42″E
- Country: Italy
- Region: Sardinia
- Province: Province of Cagliari (CA)
- Comune: Sinnai
- Elevation: 30 m (98 ft)

Population (Dec. 2007)
  - Total: 254
- Demonym: Solanesi
- Time zone: UTC+1 (CET)
  - Summer (DST): UTC+2 (CEST)
- Postal code: 09048
- Dialing code: 070
- Patron saint: S. Giuseppe
- Website: Official website

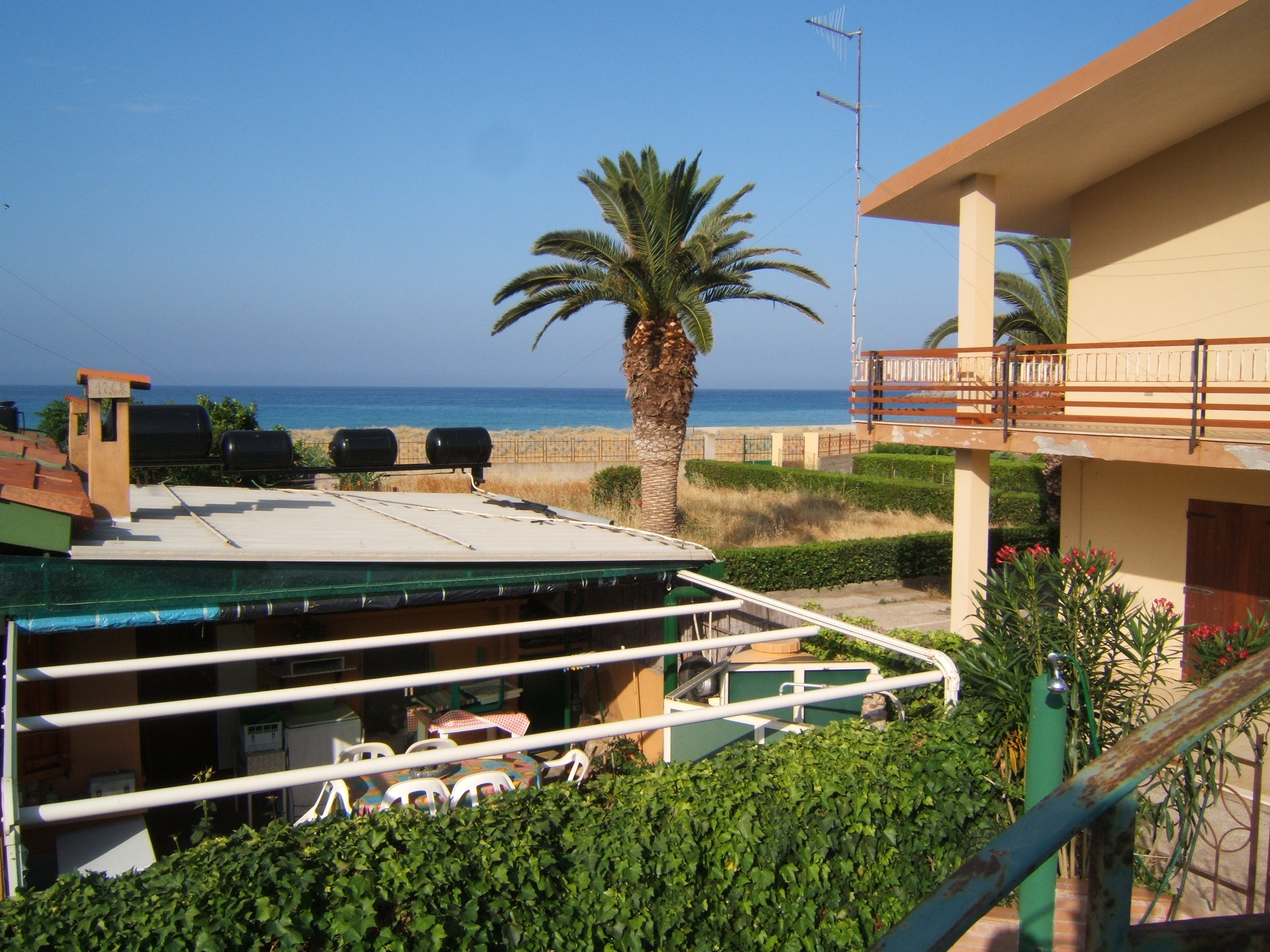
Solanas

Solanas is a small village administered by Sinnai, in the province of Cagliari on the island of Sardinia, Italy.

== Position ==
Solanas is located in the south coast of Sardinia at ~36 km east from Cagliari, and at ~16 km west from Villasimius.
It is administered by Sinnai (which is 34 km away) and its territory is unique as it is not joined to Sinnai. Solanas is surrounded by the territory of Maracalagonis and Villasimius.

== Tourism ==
Solanas comprises a small town with main facilities (pharmacy, supermarket, butcher, church, news shop, pizzerias, restaurants, hotels) which usually operate only from June to September, and a sandy beach which is ~1 km long. In the summer several bars are located in the beach, together with water-sport equipment (windsurf, water-skis, canoe, boat etc.) hiring facilities.

Mari Pintau (9 km), Geremeas and Kala 'e Moru (8 km), Genn'e Mari (4 km), Cann'e Sisa (4 km) are the closest beaches nearby.

== Related ==
- Sinnai
