= Salmagi =

Salmagi Salmagi
- Town
- Location in Italy
- Coordinates: 39.196193°N 9.336389°E
- Country: Italy
- Region: Sardinia
- Elevation: 20 m (66 ft)
- Time zone: UTC+1 (CET)
  - Summer (DST): UTC+2 (CEST)

Salmagi is a small townland within the hinterland of the commune of Quartu Sant'Elena in Sardinia, Italy. Salmagi is currently a residential area, while high in the mountains, goats are managed by a shepherd.

== Geography ==
Salmagi is on the side of a mountain. It touches the Commune of Maracalagonis. Salmagi is close to the coastline that is the entrance to the Sarrabus-Gerrei Region. Salmagi is on the central southern coast of the Sarrabus-Gerrei region.

North of Salmagi is the peak of one mountain leading into the mountain range at the center of Sarrabus. The center of Sarrabus-Gerrei is the Sette Fratelli (Parco dei Sette Fratelli - Monte Genis) range of mountains. The central village is Burcei.

East of Salmagi is "Terra Mala", "Bad Land" and a cliff-face coastline until Villasimius. Villasimius is at the most south eastern point of the island of Sardinia

South is another small townland, S'arpagiu. The coastland at S'Arpagiu is Spiaggia Tonnara "The Beach of the Tunnery" where a Tuna fish factory once operated. The factory is now derelict.

West, along the coast, is the Port of Capitana (Marina di Capitana) and further west is Cagliari, the main city of Sardinia and the small granite peninsula of "Is Mortorius", "The Prohibition of Activity".

== History ==
Its history is as the point of defence for Sardinia during wartime.
