= HMS Safari =

Royal Navy S-class submarine which served in World War II

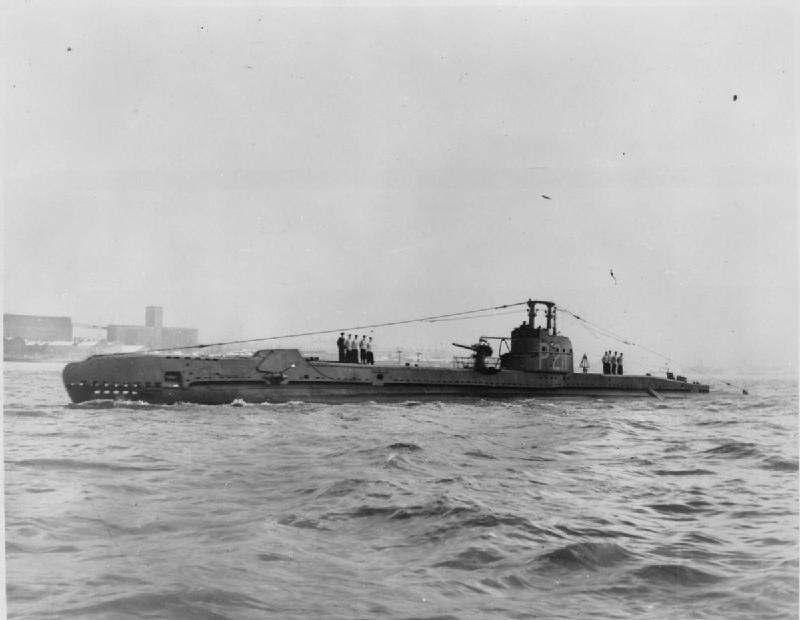
- Safari underway on the River Mersey

History

United Kingdom
- Name: Safari
- Ordered: 23 January 1940
- Builder: Cammell Laird, Birkenhead
- Laid down: 5 June 1940
- Launched: 18 November 1941
- Commissioned: 14 March 1942
- Honours and awards: Sicily 1943, Mediterranean 1943
- Fate: Sold for scrap, 7 January 1946; Sank while under tow, 8 January 1946
- Badge

General characteristics
- Class & type: S-class submarine
- Displacement: 842 long tons (856 t) (surfaced); 990 long tons (1,010 t) (submerged)
- Length: 217 ft (66.1 m)
- Beam: 23 ft 9 in (7.2 m)
- Draught: 14 ft 8 in (4.5 m)
- Installed power: 1,900 bhp (1,400 kW) (diesel); 1,300 hp (970 kW) (electric)
- Propulsion: 2 × diesel engines; 2 × electric motors
- Speed: 15 kn (28 km/h; 17 mph) (surfaced); 10 kn (19 km/h; 12 mph) (submerged)
- Range: 6,000 nmi (11,000 km; 6,900 mi) at 10 knots (19 km/h; 12 mph) (surfaced); 120 nmi (220 km; 140 mi) at 3 knots (5.6 km/h; 3.5 mph) (submerged)
- Test depth: 300 ft (91.4 m)
- Complement: 48
- Sensors & processing systems: Type 129AR or 138 ASDIC; Type 291 early-warning radar
- Armament: 6 × bow 21 in (533 mm) torpedo tubes; 1 × 3 in (76 mm) deck gun

HMS Safari was a third batch S-class submarine built for the Royal Navy during World War II. Commissioned in 1942, she was assigned to operate in the Mediterranean Sea. During the course of the war, Safari sank twenty-five ships, most of which were Italian.

Laid down on 5 June 1940 at Birkenhead, Safari was launched on 18 November 1941 and commissioned on 14 March 1942 at Holy Loch. Between May and August 1942, Safari patrolled in the west Mediterranean, based in Gibraltar. After two failed attempts to attack enemy ships during a first patrol in the Alboran Sea, Safari conducted a second patrol, sinking her first ship, the Italian merchant Adda. In her next patrol, she escorted the Allied convoy in Operation Pedestal, then sank two additional ships and damaged another. On 12 September, Safari was reassigned to the 10th Submarine Flotilla in Malta, with which she conducted two patrols in the Adriatic Sea, sinking one ship and damaging several more. Safari then operated off Sicily, evading an attack by German aircraft then sinking two ships. On 18 November, Safari fired a torpedo at ships anchored at Ras Ali, Libya; but the torpedo passed under, striking and wrecking the port's mole along a length of 25 metres (82 ft), killing five men.

Safari went on to sink five ships, then was assigned to the 8th Submarine Flotilla in Algiers. During a patrol off Naples, she was mistakenly bombed by British aircraft but was not damaged; Safari went on to sink four boats, then carried out special operations, landing men in Sicily, then later in Sardinia. After an attack by an Italian destroyer in which she was not damaged, Safari conducted two patrols during the Allied landings in North Africa, sinking four ships. Safari returned to England on 8 September 1943, and conducted training operations with the 7th Submarine Flotilla, punctuated by a short patrol off Norway to guard against a potential sortie to Germany of the German battleship Tirpitz.

After the end of World War II, Safari was placed in reserve, then sold for scrap on 7 January 1946. However, she sank off Portland the next day while being towed to the shipbreaking yard.

== Design and description ==
The S-class submarines were intended to patrol the restricted waters of the North Sea and the Mediterranean Sea. The third batch was slightly enlarged and improved over the preceding second batch of the S-class. The submarines had a length of 217 feet (66.1 m) overall, a beam of 23 feet 9 inches (7.2 m) and a draught of 14 feet 8 inches (4.5 m). They displaced 842 long tons (856 t) on the surface and 990 long tons (1,010 t) submerged. The S-class submarines had a crew of 48 officers and ratings. They had a diving depth of 300 feet (91.4 m).

For surface running, the boats were powered by two 950-brake-horsepower (708 kW) diesel engines, each driving one propeller shaft. When submerged each propeller was driven by a 650-horsepower (485 kW) electric motor. They could reach 15 knots (28 km/h; 17 mph) on the surface and 10 knots (19 km/h; 12 mph) underwater. On the surface, the third-batch boats had a range of 6,000 nautical miles (11,000 km; 6,900 mi) at 10 knots (19 km/h; 12 mph) and 120 nmi (220 km; 140 mi) at 3 knots (5.6 km/h; 3.5 mph) submerged.

Safari was armed with six 21-inch (533 mm) torpedo tubes in the bow. She carried six reload torpedoes for the bow tubes for a total of a dozen torpedoes. Twelve mines could be carried in lieu of the torpedoes. The boat was also equipped with a three-inch (76 mm) deck gun. The third-batch S-class boats were fitted with either a Type 129AR or 138 ASDIC system and a Type 291 or 291W early-warning radar.

== Construction and career ==
Ordered on 23 January 1940, Safari was laid down in Birkenhead by Cammell Laird on 5 June 1940. She was launched on 18 November 1941. The boat departed the builder's yard on 10 March 1942 and was commissioned into the Royal Navy on 14 March at Holy Loch.

=== West Mediterranean ===
After training, Safari departed for Gibraltar on 14 May together with the submarines HMS Unison and HMS Traveller, escorted by the sloop HMS La Capricieuse. After arriving on 26 May, Safari conducted exercises before departing for her first war patrol in the Alboran Sea. On 13 June, she sighted a convoy of two Italian light cruisers, escorted by three destroyers and attempted to attack, but they were out of torpedo range. Four days later, she sighted a surfaced submarine, most probably the Italian Uarsciek, but the submarine was out of attacking range. Safari returned to Gibraltar on 23 June after sighting no more enemy ships.

On 4 July, Safari departed Gibraltar for her second war patrol with orders to patrol off Sardinia. She sank the Italian merchant ship SS Adda with gunfire and a torpedo on 12 July, at position 40°02′N 09°48′E. Three days later, the boat damaged another Italian merchantman, SS Tigrai, off the Gulf of Orosei. Safari returned to Gibraltar on 24 July.

Starting on 4 August, Safari patrolled north of Sicily, with additional orders to provide protection during Operation Pedestal, an Allied convoy operation to resupply Malta. Two days later, she sighted a surfaced submarine, possibly the Italian Acciaio-class submarine Giada, although the submarine dived before an attack could be carried out. On 16 August, Safari escorted the convoy in Operation Pedestal, with the intent of being spotted on the surface by enemy aircraft and discourage potential attacks from enemy surface warships. Although the boat did not encounter enemy forces, the convoy operation was a British strategic success. On 14 August, Safari returned to normal patrols, and she damaged the Italian sailing vessel Gioavannina M with gunfire two days later. The next day, she encountered and sank another Italian sailing ship, Ausonia, off Orosei, Sardinia. On 18 August, Safari sank the Italian ship Perseo off Cape Carbonara, then attacked, but missed, the Italian submarine Bronzo with torpedoes later in the day. She returned to Gibraltar on 24 August.

=== Adriatic Sea ===
Safari departed Gibraltar to join the 10th Submarine Flotilla, based in Malta, on 12 September. She arrived the following week, then left Grand Harbour on 26 September for a patrol in the Adriatic Sea. On 2 October, she damaged the Italian merchant Veglia with gunfire and a torpedo, forcing the ship to be beached and then declared a total loss. Two days later, Safari missed the Italian merchantman Valentino Coda with four torpedoes, then surfaced to use her main gun; the attack had to be broken off when the enemy returned fire and a destroyer was sent to hunt the submarine. On 5 October, Safari damaged the Italian merchant Eneo and caused it to be beached on rocks; Eneo was later declared a total loss. The boat missed the Italian steamer Giuseppe Magluilo with three torpedoes on 8 October. The Italian torpedo boat T5, which was patrolling close by, subsequently depth charged Safari, but caused only minor damage. Two days later, she attacked but missed the steamer Goffredo Mameli, which was in a convoy with two other ships escorted by the Italian torpedo boat T7. She managed to evade the torpedo boat without sustaining damage, then ended her fourth patrol at Malta on 14 October.

On 18 October, Safari departed Malta for another patrol in the Adriatic, with orders to intercept an enemy convoy near Pantelleria. However, she failed to sight the convoy, so the boat was ordered to meet another convoy south of the island of Lampedusa. One of the ships in the convoy, Titania, had been damaged by air-dropped torpedoes the preceding night and had dropped out of the convoy together with two destroyer escorts. Safari fired a torpedo at the merchant ship, but missed; she then launched another torpedo at her target which exploded and sank. After evading a counter-attack by the escorting destroyers, Safari returned to Malta two days later, ending her four-day patrol.

=== Southern Italy ===
After departing Malta on 3 November, the boat was assigned to patrol north of Sicily, Italy, to support the Allied landings in North Africa. On the way to her patrol area, Safari was attacked by German Messerschmitt Bf 109 fighter aircraft, but was not damaged. She sank the Italian vessel Bice on 13 November, east of Sousse, Tunisia. After changing her patrol area to the Gulf of Sirte three days later, she torpedoed and sank the German transport Hans Arp, anchored along with a German minesweeper, off Ras Ali, Libya. Safari launched a torpedo at several barges anchored at Ras Ali on 17 November, but their draught was too shallow and the torpedo passed under and hit the port's mole, destroying it along a distance of 25 metres (82 ft), killing five and wounding fifteen men. Safari also attacked an unidentified schooner with a torpedo later in the day, but missed. On 18 November, the boat sank a small vessel and damaged a landing barge with gunfire in the same area. She fired a torpedo on 21 November at a landing barge in Ras Ali, but the torpedo again went under and hit the mole as it had four days prior. On 22 November, she damaged another landing craft off of Ras Sulta with gunfire, but had to break off the attack after expending all her 3-inch ammunition. The boat returned to Malta on 24 November.

Safari departed Malta on 16 December for her seventh war patrol, with orders to operate off Hammamet, Tunisia. After patrolling for two days, she sighted the Italian vessel Eufrasia C and sank it with gunfire in the Gulf of Hammamet. Safari severely damaged an Italian patrol vessel, Costantina, on 20 November; Costantina had to be beached and was later declared a total loss. Later the next day Safari sank the Italian magnetic minesweeper Rosina S with gunfire, then finished it with a torpedo when it stayed afloat. On 23 December, Safari made a short stop at Malta to land prisoners of war, refuel, and replenish her ammunition supply. While patrolling south of Sousa, Tunisia, on 27 December, Safari sank with gunfire the Italian vessel Eleonora Rosa which was carrying 100 long tons (100 t) of petrol. Two days later, she sank the Italian merchant ship Torquato Gennari with torpedoes south of Sfax, Tunisia. The boat ended her patrol at Malta on 30 December.

=== Algiers ===
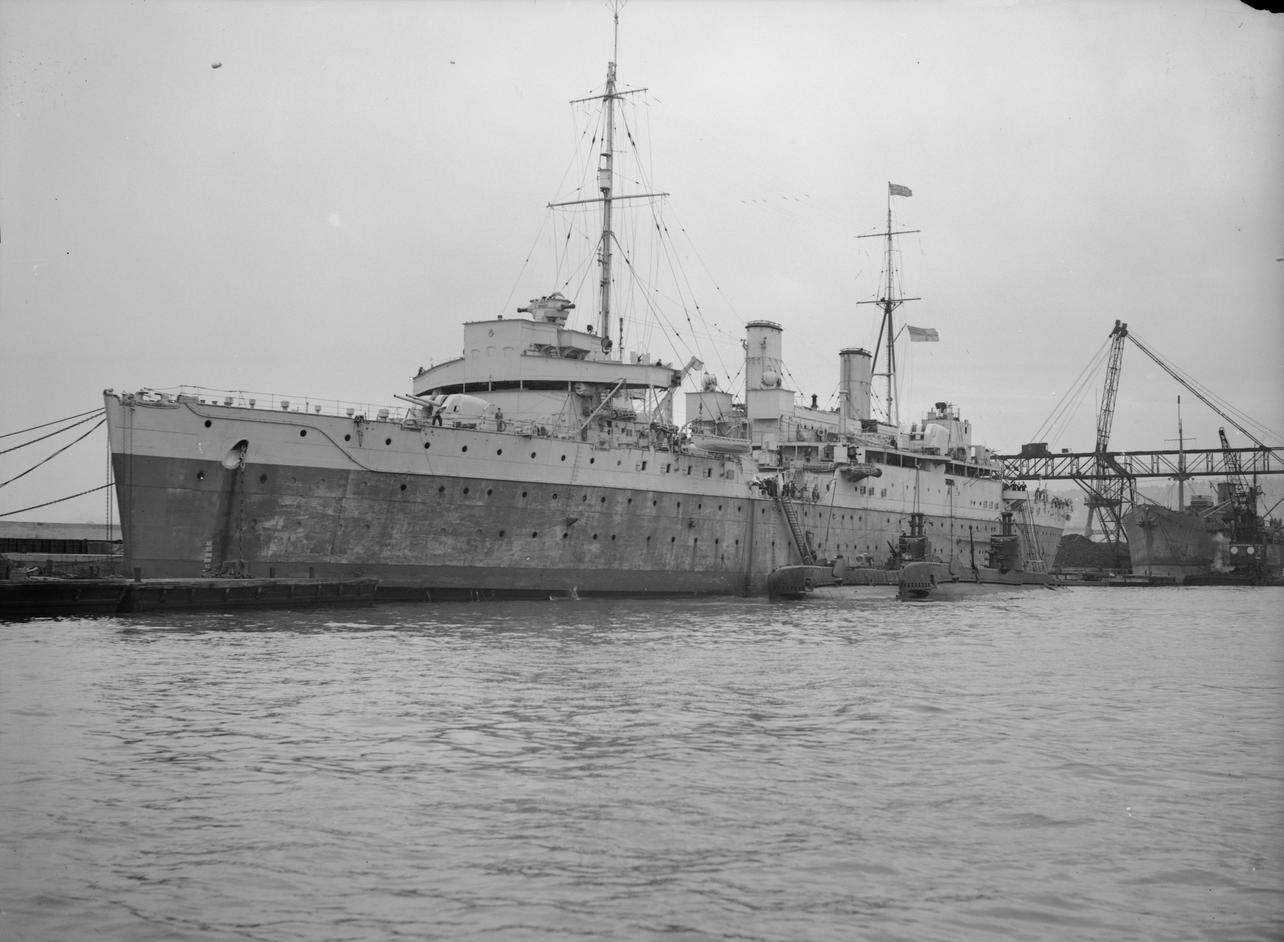
Safari in Algiers alongside the depot ship HMS Maidstone

After departing Malta on 2 January 1943, Safari arrived at Algiers on 6 January to join the 8th Submarine Flotilla, based in Algiers. She departed port on 20 January to patrol off Naples, Italy. The next day, the boat, in the British bombing restriction zone, was mistakenly bombed by an off-course Royal Air Force Vickers Wellington aircraft. On 24 January, Safari attempted to attack an enemy destroyer, but was detected by the sonar of the ship, which attacked her with depth charges. The destroyer was probably the Italian Navigatori-class destroyer Lanzerotto Malocello, which reported an attack on this day, but lost sonar contact due to equipment failure. Safari attempted to attack an Italian convoy on 26 January, but missed the ships with four torpedoes. On 30 January, the boat sank the Italian schooners Sant’Aniello and Gemma, sailing for Vibo Valentia, with gunfire off Cape Scalea, Italy. On 2 February she sighted and attacked a convoy of two Italian merchant ships off Capri; Valsavoia was sunk with torpedoes and Salemi with gunfire. Safari then returned to Algiers on 8 February.

On 22 February, Safari departed Algeria, this time on a mission to land reconnaissance engineers on the beaches north of Sicily. The men would reach the ground in folbots, small folding kayaks. Several missions were launched between 27 February and 13 March, and, with the mission completed, Safari resumed patrol duties, sinking the Italian vessel Stefano M off Cape San Vito on 9 March, then returned to Algiers on the 13th.

Safari departed Algiers on 27 March, with orders to patrol south of Sardinia, Italy, and, on 3 April, sank the Italian vessels Nasello and S. Francisco di Paola A with gunfire off the Gulf of Orosei. On 6 April, she missed the Italian merchant Vincenzina with torpedoes, then sank the Italian minesweeper Bella Italia off Cape Carbonara on 9 April. The next day, she intercepted a convoy of Italian ships, escorted by two minesweepers, and sank the auxiliary ship Loredan and tanker Isonzo. The last ship of the convoy, Entella, ran aground while maneuvering to avoid torpedoes, and was sunk by Safari the following day. Safari returned to Algiers on 14 April.

After conducting exercises, Safari departed Algiers on 29 April for her eleventh patrol, northwest of Sardinia, Italy. After four days at sea, the boat sank the Italian auxiliary ship Sogliola with gunfire off Asinara Island, then went on to sink the minesweeper Onda with torpedoes in the same area. On 8 May, she sank the Italian merchant ship Liv, which had earlier been damaged in an air attack, in Porto Torres, Sardinia. Safari ended her patrol on 14 May at Algiers.

On 26 May, Safari departed Algiers, tasked with carrying out Operation Marigold. On 30 May, she landed two men of the Special Boat Section, off Muravera, Sardinia. The men returned shortly after midnight after purposely dropping a notebook on land for deception purposes. Safari launched twelve men in two folbots and two dinghies in the early morning on 1 June. They were to conduct reconnaissance and attempt to capture an enemy soldier for interrogation; however, the landing party came under fire on the shore and returned to the submarine with one missing. With the special mission completed, the boat disembarked the men at Annaba on 3 June. Continuing her normal patrol Safari attempted to attack an Italian convoy, but was detected and unsuccessfully attacked with depth charges by an Italian destroyer. Two days later, she was again attacked by an Italian ship, this time the Ciclone-class torpedo boat Ardito, which spotted her on the surface, then attacked with depth charges. On 10 June, Safari sank the German transport KT-12, bound for Cagliari, with torpedoes then ended her patrol in Algiers on 15 June.

=== Operation Husky ===
On 30 June 1943, the boat shifted to Bizerte, arriving the next day, then left port on 4 July to conduct her thirteenth war patrol, with orders to act as a directional radio beacon during the Allied invasion of Sicily. Shortly before leaving port, Safari was accidentally rammed by a French tug, but sustained only minor damage which was repaired by her crew. On 9 June, Safari executed her special mission off Licata, making radio contact with the American destroyer USS Bristol. The next day, Safari, on her way to Malta, was bombed by German Junkers Ju 88 bombers, with several bombs falling close. Safari ended her patrol that afternoon at Malta.

Safari commenced her patrol on 15 July, operating west of Corsica and Sardinia. After three days at sea, she sank the Italian minesweeper Amalia with gunfire. On 19 July, she attacked two German landing barges and an Italian armed yacht, sinking one and damaging the other with gunfire, respectively. The next day, the boat sighted the Italian armed vessel Silvia Onorato, which was transporting 180 tons of cement; she fired two torpedoes at the ship, which erupted in explosions and quickly went to the bottom. Safari went on to sink the Italian minelayer Durazzo with torpedoes east of Corsica on 22 July, then the Italian minesweeper FR 70 northwest of Elba with gunfire on 25 July. On 26 July, the boat missed a large merchant ship off Piombino, Toscane, then attacked the German tanker Champagne, but also missed. Safari returned to Algiers on 30 July.

=== End of war ===
After a stop at Gibraltar, Safari conducted an anti-submarine war patrol in the Bay of Biscay starting on 22 August 1943, but did not sight any targets, and ended her patrol in Portsmouth on 8 September. Safari then underwent a refit at Troon, then, after a stop at Holy Loch, departed for Rothesay, joining the 7th Submarine Flotilla. This flotilla solely conducted training, and Safari was frequently used to train future submarine commanding officers in the Submarine Command Course. On 16 March 1944, the boat was ordered to patrol off Norway during Operation Foremost due to fears that the German battleship Tirpitz might sortie to Germany for repairs; after three days, however, the British Admiralty realized that the battleship would not move out, and Safari was recalled. She then conducted training exercises for the rest of the war.

After the end of World War II, Safari was placed in reserve, then sold to J. Cashmore for scrapping on 7 January 1946. The next day, the boat sank en route to the shipbreaking yards southeast of Portland.
