= Capo Sant'Elia Lighthouse =

Lighthouse in Sardinia, Italy

Capo Sant'Elia
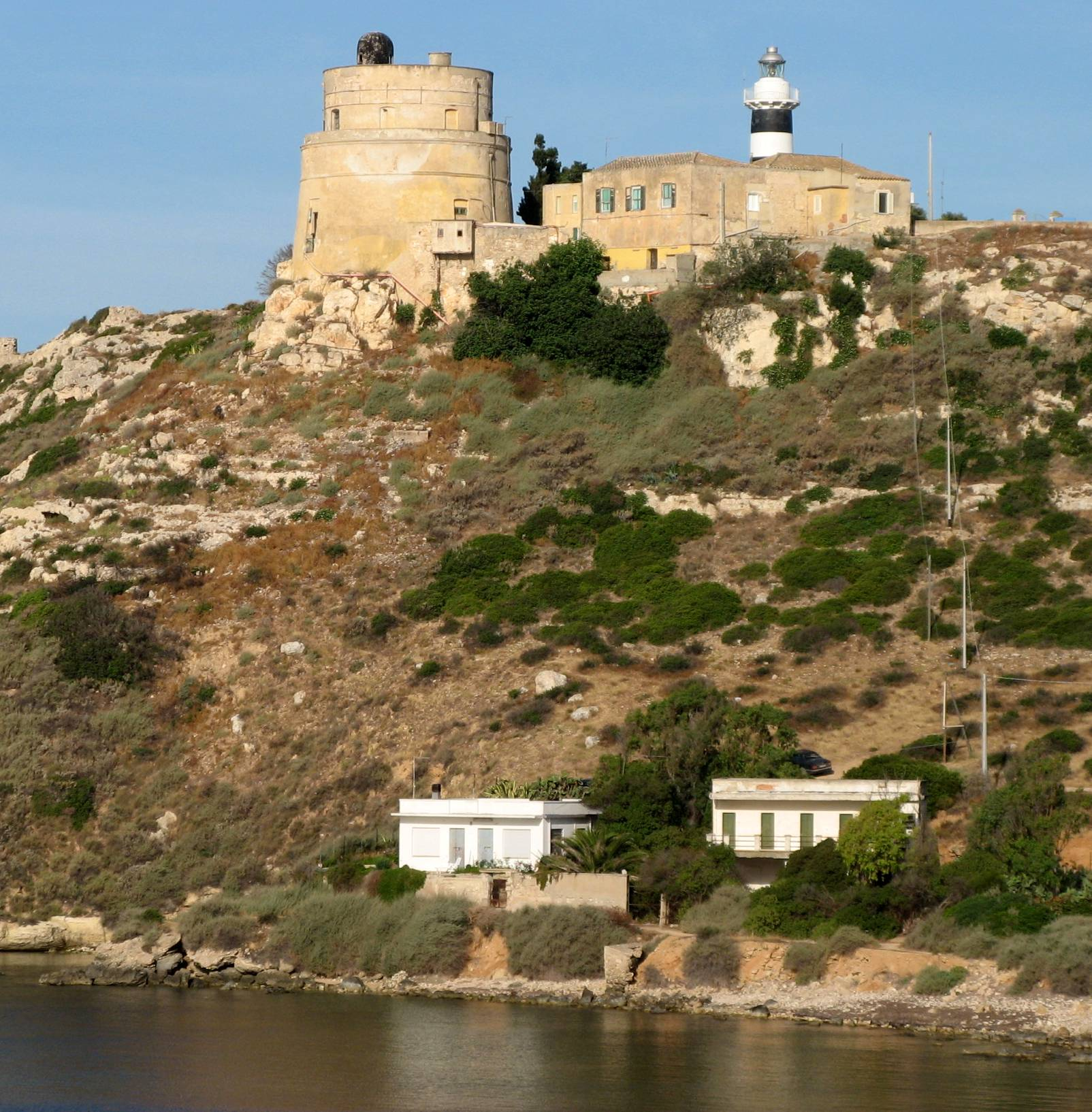
- Capo Sant'Elia Lighthouse
- Location: Capo Sant'Elia; Cagliari; Sardinia; Italy
- Coordinates: 39°11′03″N 9°08′51″E

Tower
- Constructed: 1860
- Foundation: concrete base
- Construction: masonry tower
- Automated: yes
- Height: 21 metres (69 ft)
- Shape: cylindrical tower with balcony and lantern attached to a 2-storey keeper's house
- Markings: white and black horizontal bands tower, white lantern, grey metallic lantern dome
- Power source: mains electricity
- Operator: Marina Militare
- Fog signal: no

Light
- Focal height: 70 metres (230 ft)
- Lens: Type OR D4
- Intensity: main: AL 1000 W reserve: LABI 100 W
- Range: main: 21 nautical miles (39 km; 24 mi) reserve: 18 nautical miles (33 km; 21 mi)
- Characteristic: Fl (2) W 10s.
- Italy no.: 1270 E.F.

Capo Sant'Elia Lighthouse (Italian: Faro di Capo Sant'Elia) is an active lighthouse located on Capo Sant'Elia promontory, adjacent to Calamosca Bay which separates the Golfo degli Angeli from that of Quartu Sant'Elena. The structure is situated in the municipality of Quartu Sant'Elena, in the southern Sardinia on the Tyrrhenian Sea.

== Description ==
The lighthouse was built in 1860 and consists of a masonry cylindrical tower, 21 metres (69 ft) high, with balcony and lantern attached to a 2-storey keeper's house. The tower is painted with black and white horizontal bands. The lantern, which mounts a Type OR D4 optics, is painted in white and the dome in grey metallic. The light is positioned at 70 metres (230 ft) above sea level and emits two white flashes in a 10 seconds period visible up to a distance of 21 nautical miles (39 km; 24 mi). The lighthouse is completely automated and managed by the Marina Militare with the identification code number 1270 E.F.

== See also ==
- List of lighthouses in Italy
- Quartu Sant'Elena
