= Villasalto =

Biddesatu/Villasalto
- Comune
- Comunu de Biddesatu/Comune di Villasalto
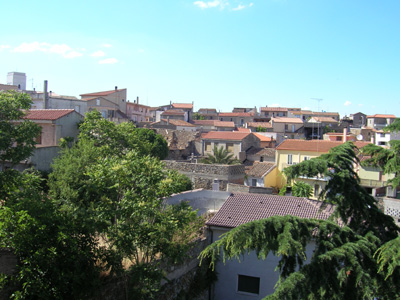

- Location within Sardinia
- Coordinates: 39°30′N 9°24′E
- Country: Italy
- Region: Sardinia
- Metropolitan city: Cagliari (CA)

Area
  - Total: 130.1 km^{2} (50.2 sq mi)

Population (Dec. 2004)
  - Total: 1,282
  - Density: 9.854/km^{2} (25.52/sq mi)
- Time zone: UTC+1 (CET)
  - Summer (DST): UTC+2 (CEST)
- Postal code: 09040
- Dialing code: 070

Villasalto (Sardinian: Bidda de Sartu, Bidda de Saltu) is a comune (municipality) in the Metropolitan City of Cagliari in the Italian region Sardinia, located about 40 kilometres (25 mi) northeast of Cagliari. As of 31 December 2004, it had a population of 1,282 and an area of 130.1 square kilometres (50.2 mi^{2}).

Villasalto/Biddesatu borders the following municipalities: Armungia, Burcei, Dolianova, San Nicolò Gerrei, San Vito, Sinnai, Villaputzu.

== Demographic evolution ==
Historical population

Year	Pop.	±%
1861	1,714	—
1871	1,663	−3.0%
1881	1,821	+9.5%
1901	2,179	+19.7%
1911	2,509	+15.1%

Year	Pop.	±%
1921	2,272	−9.4%
1931	2,325	+2.3%
1936	2,250	−3.2%
1951	2,572	+14.3%
1961	2,402	−6.6%

Year	Pop.	±%
1971	2,028	−15.6%
1981	1,799	−11.3%
1991	1,539	−14.5%
2001	1,353	−12.1%

Source: Data from ISTAT
