= Maracalagonis =

Maracalagonis Mara-Calagonis (Sardinian)
- Comune
- Comune di Maracalagonis
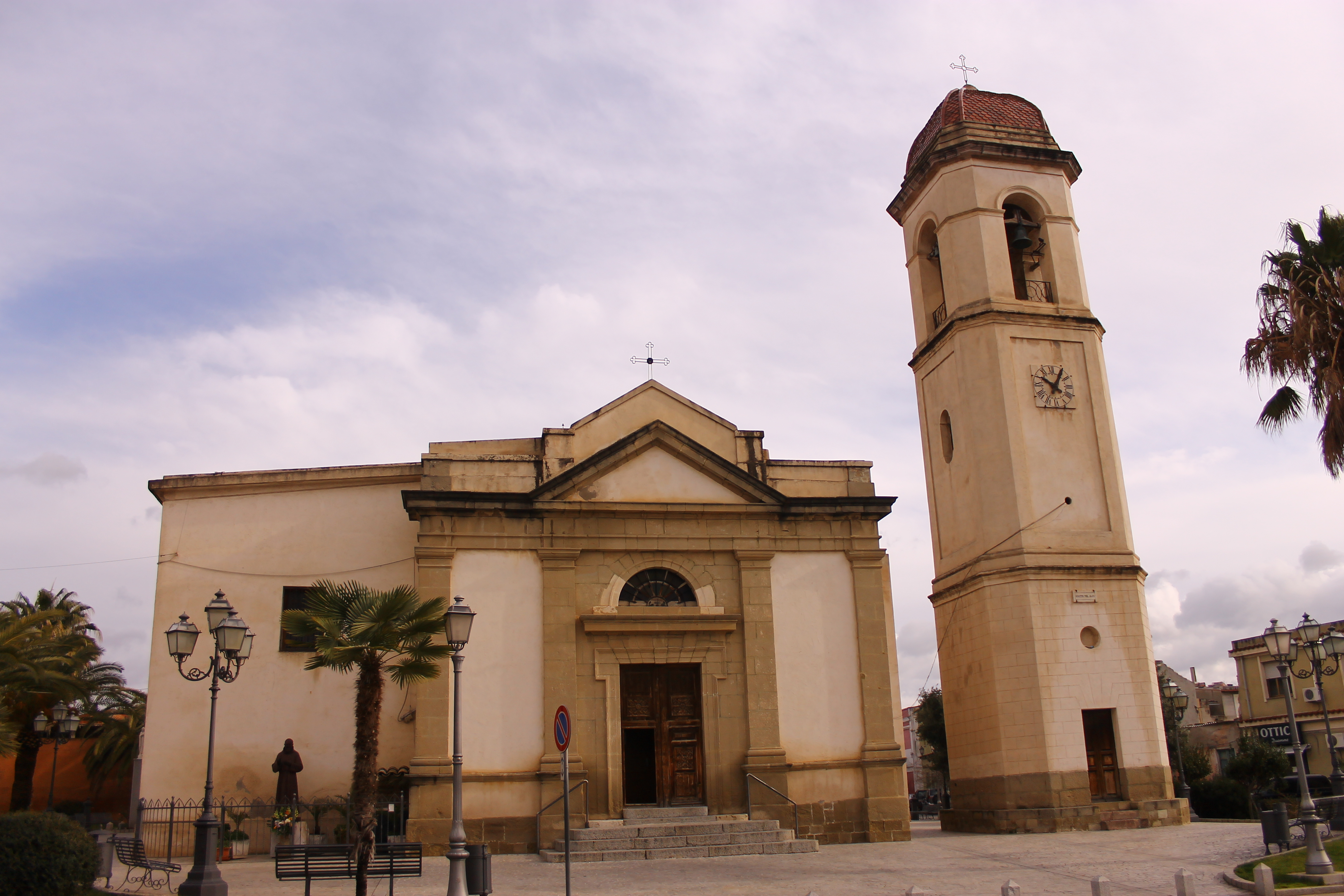
- Church of Vergine degli Angeli

- Location within Sardinia
- Coordinates: 39°17′N 9°14′E
- Country: Italy
- Region: Sardinia
- Metropolitan city: Cagliari (CA)

Government
  - Mayor: Mario Fadda

Area
  - Total: 101.37 km^{2} (39.14 sq mi)
- Elevation: 82 m (269 ft)

Population (2025)
  - Total: 7,883
  - Density: 77.76/km^{2} (201.4/sq mi)
- Demonym: Maresi
- Time zone: UTC+1 (CET)
  - Summer (DST): UTC+2 (CEST)
- Postal code: 09069
- Dialing code: 070
- Website: Official website

Maracalagonis (Sardinian: Mara-Calagonis, mara meaning "marsh"), is a comune (municipality) in the Metropolitan City of Cagliari in the Italian region of Sardinia, located about 12 kilometres (7 mi) northeast of Cagliari. It has 7,883 inhabitants.

Maracalagonis borders the following municipalities: Castiadas, Quartu Sant'Elena (more specifically Salmagi), Quartucciu, Sinnai, Villasimius.

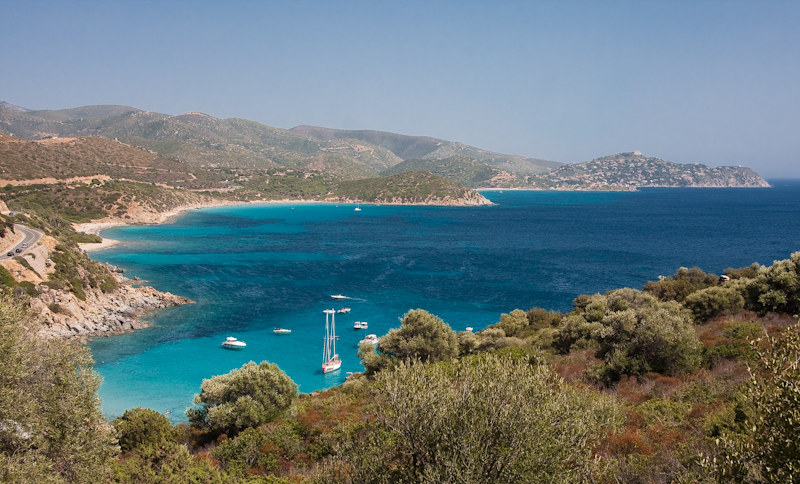
Genn'e Mari beach near Torre delle Stelle

== Demographics ==
Historical population

Year	Pop.	±%
1861	1,099	—
1871	1,109	+0.9%
1881	1,097	−1.1%
1901	1,519	+38.5%
1911	1,791	+17.9%
1921	2,061	+15.1%
1931	2,277	+10.5%
1936	2,587	+13.6%

Year	Pop.	±%
1951	3,133	+21.1%
1961	3,677	+17.4%
1971	4,164	+13.2%
1981	5,180	+24.4%
1991	5,982	+15.5%
2001	6,731	+12.5%
2011	7,523	+11.8%
2021	7,909	+5.1%

Source: ISTAT
