= Sinnai =

Sinnai Sìnnia
- Comune
- Comune di Sinnai
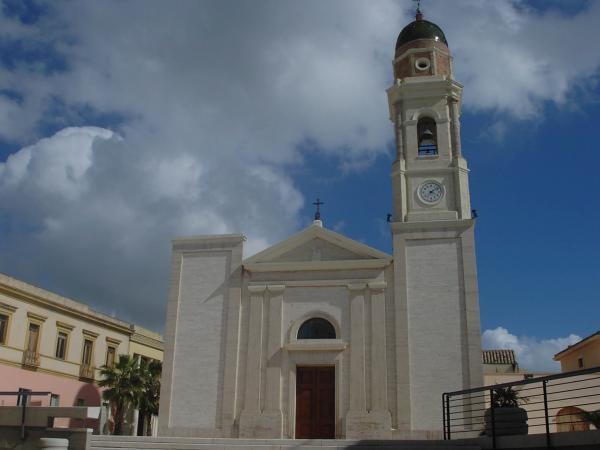
- Church of Santa Barbara

- Coat of arms

- Location within Sardinia
- Coordinates: 39°18′N 9°12′E
- Country: Italy
- Region: Sardinia
- Metropolitan city: Cagliari (CA)
- Frazioni: San Gregorio, Solanas, Tasonis

Area
  - Total: 223.4 km^{2} (86.3 sq mi)
- Elevation: 133 m (436 ft)

Population (2025)
  - Total: 17,364
  - Density: 77.73/km^{2} (201.3/sq mi)
- Demonym: Sinnaesi
- Time zone: UTC+1 (CET)
  - Summer (DST): UTC+2 (CEST)
- Postal code: 09048
- Dialing code: 070
- Website: Official website

Sinnai (Sardinian: Sìnnia) is a comune (municipality) of the Metropolitan City of Cagliari in the Italian region Sardinia, located about 12 kilometres (7 mi) northeast of Cagliari. It has 17,364 inhabitants.

Sinnai borders the following municipalities: Burcei, Castiadas, Dolianova, Maracalagonis, Quartucciu, San Vito, Settimo San Pietro, Soleminis, Villasalto, Villasimius.

== Demographics ==
Historical population

Year	Pop.	±%
1861	2,984	—
1871	2,977	−0.2%
1881	3,101	+4.2%
1901	3,847	+24.1%
1911	4,444	+15.5%
1921	4,658	+4.8%
1931	5,122	+10.0%
1936	5,617	+9.7%

Year	Pop.	±%
1951	6,736	+19.9%
1961	7,725	+14.7%
1971	8,799	+13.9%
1981	11,229	+27.6%
1991	13,086	+16.5%
2001	15,235	+16.4%
2011	16,730	+9.8%
2021	17,323	+3.5%

Source: ISTAT

== Twin towns ==
- Tempio Pausania, Italy
- Armungia, Italy
- Bovolone, Italy
- Foza, Italy
- Asiago, Italy
