= San Vito, Sardinia =

San Vito Santu Idu (Sardinian)
- Comune
- Comune di San Vito
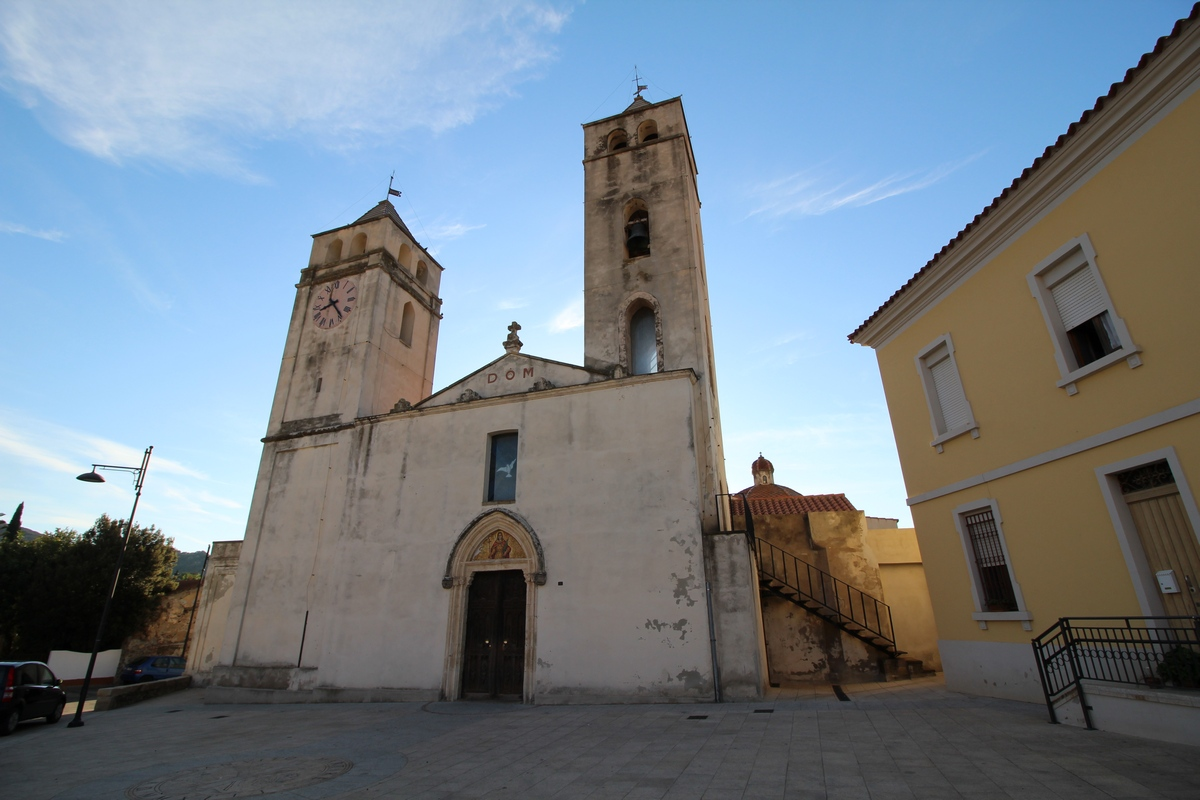

- Location within Italy Location within Sardinia
- Coordinates: 39°27′N 9°33′E
- Country: Italy
- Region: Sardinia
- Metropolitan city: Cagliari (CA)

Government
  - Mayor: Maria Gabriella Meloni

Area
  - Total: 231.8 km^{2} (89.5 sq mi)
- Elevation: 10 m (33 ft)

Population (30 November 2011)
  - Total: 3,866
  - Density: 16.68/km^{2} (43.20/sq mi)
- Demonym(s): Sanvitesi; Santuidesus
- Time zone: UTC+1 (CET)
  - Summer (DST): UTC+2 (CEST)
- Postal code: 09040
- Dialing code: 070

San Vito (Sardinian: Santu Idu or Santu Bidu, from Saint Vitus) is a comune (municipality) in the Metropolitan City of Cagliari in the Italian region Sardinia, located about 45 km (28 mi) northeast of Cagliari.

San Vito borders the Burcei, Castiadas, Muravera, Sinnai, Villaputzu, and Villasalto municipalities.

It is the birthplace of launeddas player Luigi Lai.
