= Luigi Lai =

Luigi Lai (born July 25, 1932) is an Italian musician from Sardinia, and is a living heir of the school of Sarrabus players of the launeddas.

Lai was born in San Vito, in the province of Cagliari. As a child in nearby Villaputzu, he became a student of one of launeddas player Antonio Lara. For a time he lived in Switzerland and studied at the Academy of Music in Zurich. He now works to spread awareness of the launeddas in Italy and worldwide, and instructs many students.

In 1977 he collaborated with Angelo Branduardi playing the typical Sardinian instrument on the album la pulce d'acqua.
