= Castiadas =

- Comune
- Comune di Castiadas
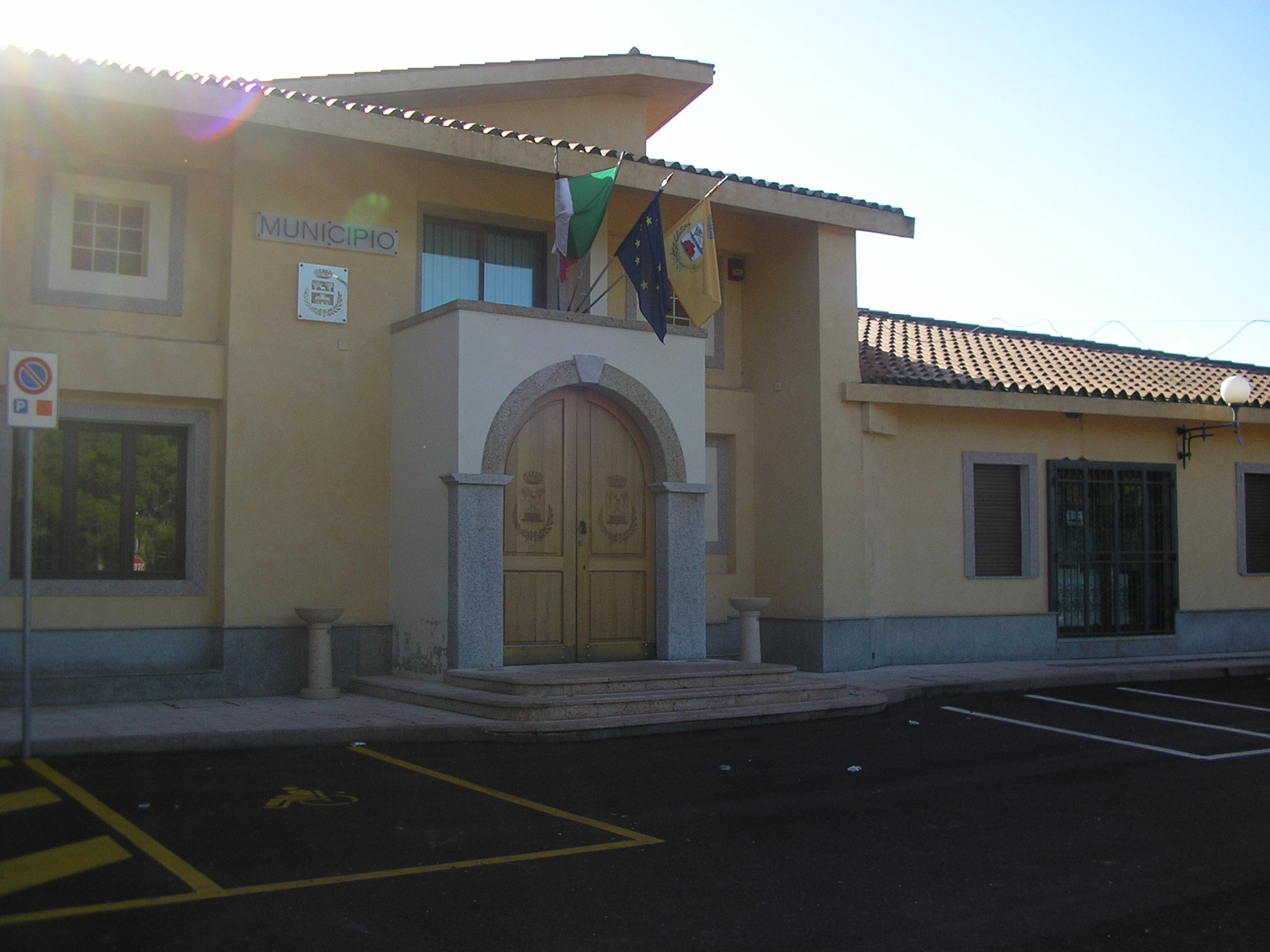
- The city hall.

- Coat of arms

- Location within Sardinia
- Coordinates: 39°14′N 9°30′E
- Country: Italy
- Region: Sardinia
- Metropolitan city: Cagliari (CA)

Government
  - Mayor: Eugenio Murgioni

Area
  - Total: 102.3 km^{2} (39.5 sq mi)
- Elevation: 60 m (200 ft)

Population (31 December 2010)
  - Total: 1,507
  - Density: 14.73/km^{2} (38.15/sq mi)
- Demonym: Castiadesi
- Time zone: UTC+1 (CET)
  - Summer (DST): UTC+2 (CEST)
- Postal code: 09040
- Dialing code: 070
- Website: Official website

Castiadas is a comune (municipality) in the Metropolitan City of Cagliari in the Italian region Sardinia, located about 35 kilometres (22 mi) east of Cagliari. Founded in the 14th century and repopulated in the 19th century after centuries of abandonment, it is part of the Sarrabus-Gerrei historical region.

In 1875 the largest penal colony in Italy was opened in Castiadas, and remained in use until 1956. The construction of the penal colony was part of a larger initiative to repopulate areas of Sardinia that had been abandoned because of malaria and to transform marshy, unproductive land into farmland. The history of the colony is recounted in Il miracolo dei rei, a documentary film by Alessandra Usai.

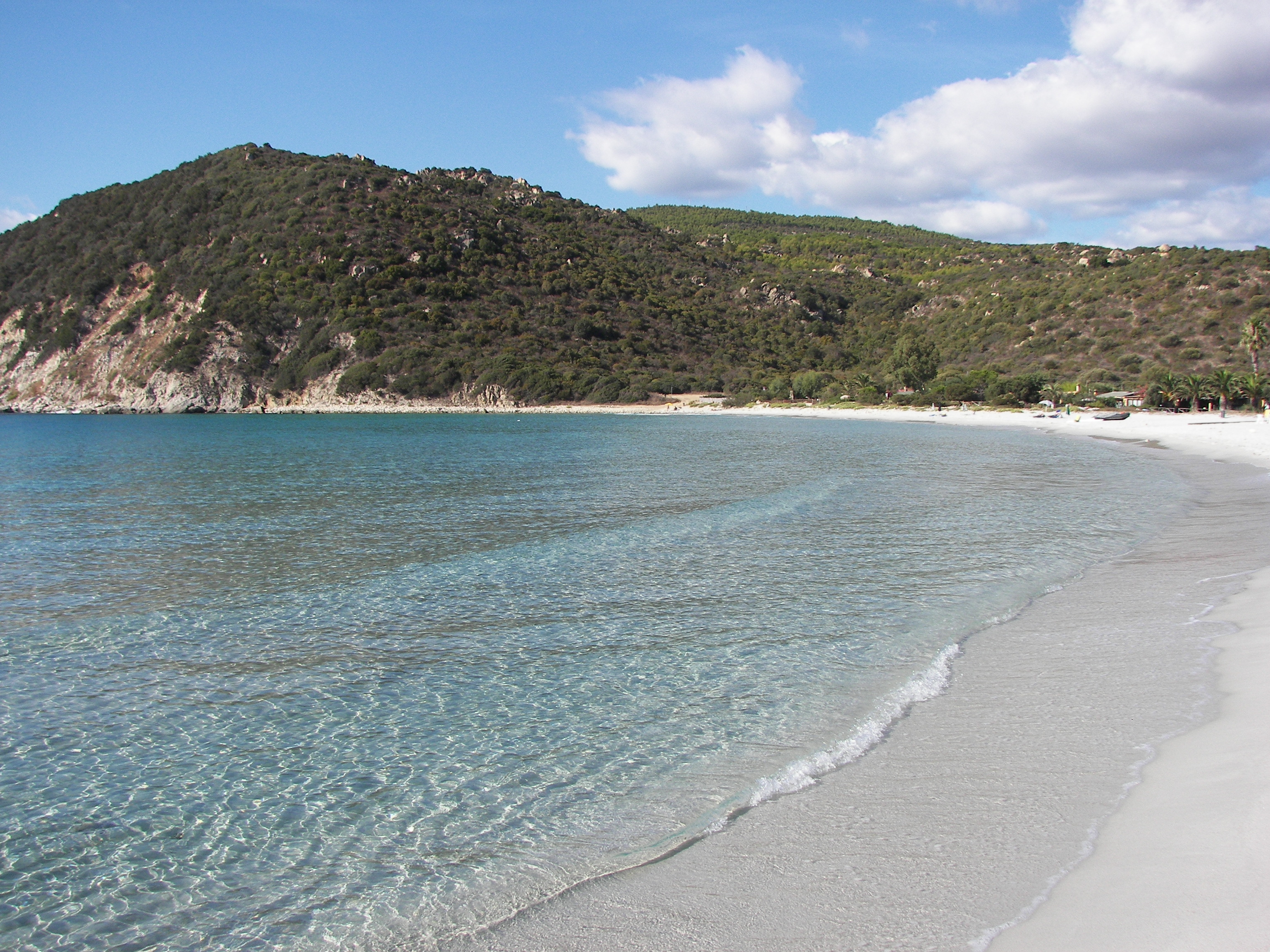
Cala Pira

The area was populated by Italian Tunisians, mainly of sicilian descent, immigrated here from Bizerte in 1965.

Castiadas borders the following municipalities: Maracalagonis, Muravera, San Vito, Sinnai, Villasimius.
