= Poetto =

Beach in Cagliari, Sardinia, Italy

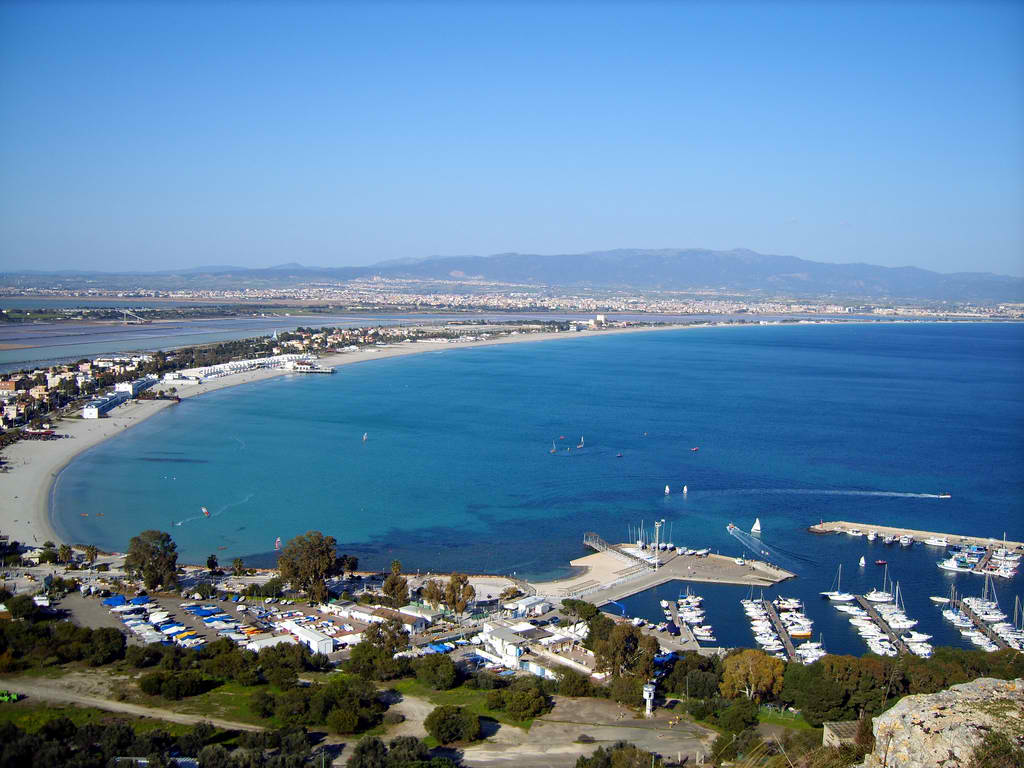

Poetto is the main beach of Cagliari in Sardinia, Italy. It stretches for about 8 km, from Sella del Diavolo ('Devil's Saddle') up to the coastline of Quartu Sant'Elena. Poetto is also the name of the district located on the western stretch of the strip between the beach and Molentargius - Saline Regional Park.

== Etymology ==
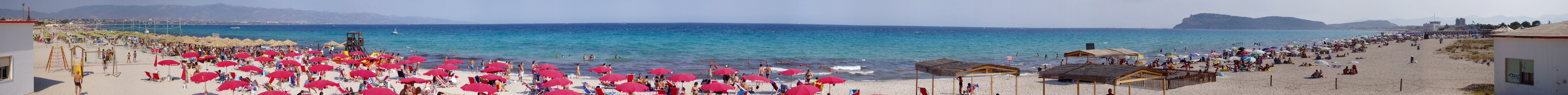
Panoramic view of Poetto

The name of the beach supposedly derives from an Aragon Tower named "Poet's Tower", which is still visible above the Sella del Diavolo. Another hypothesis is that the name "Poetto" is linked to the Catalan pohuet ('small well'), referring to the numerous wells and tanks scattered on the Sella del Diavolo for the storage of rainwater. The name could also derive from the Spanish word puerto, since the first part, Marina Piccola, is also a port.

== History ==
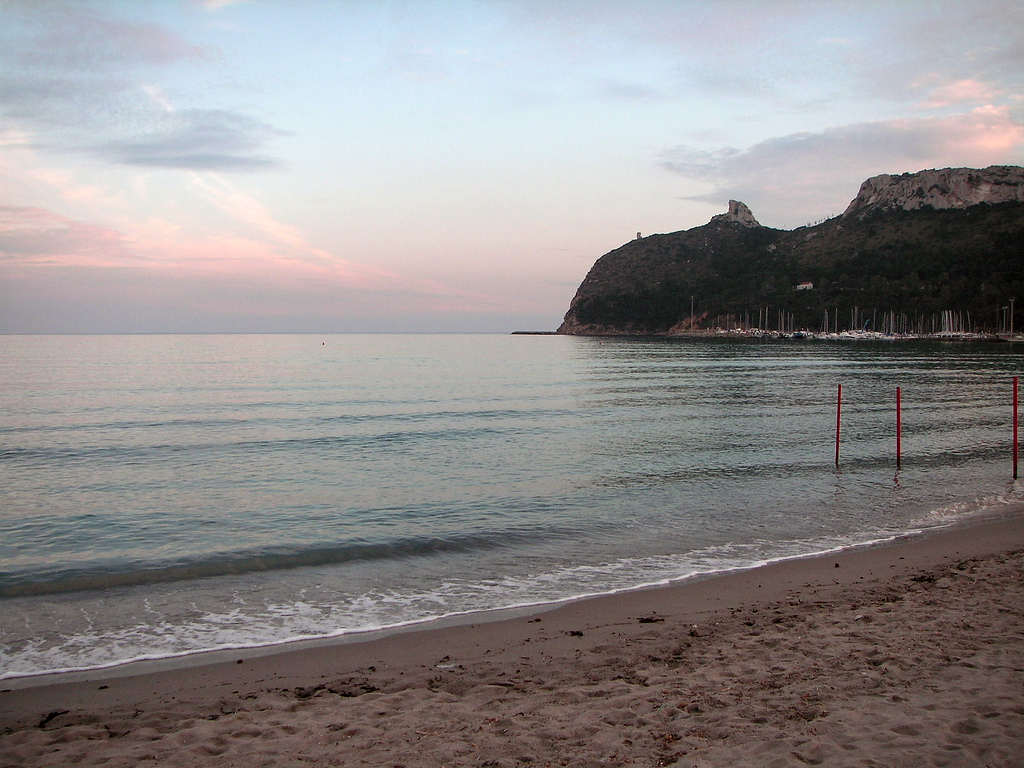
The Sella del Diavolo view from Poetto beach

Until 1900 Poetto beach was not very popular with Cagliaritans, who instead preferred the west side of the Golfo degli Angeli, with the beaches of Sa Perdixedda (Sardinian, 'small stone') and Giorgino. It was during the first decades of the 20th century that people began to appreciate the white dunes of Poetto, and the first seaside resorts ("Lido" and "D'Aquila"), bars and even a hospital (Ospedale Marino) were built. A number of casotti (coloured wooden constructions halfway between a dressing room and a tiny house on the seashore) were built, imitating the first Lido's "cabine" (dressing rooms). The casotti, however, were entirely removed in 1986 for sanitation reasons. Their removal, the overcrowding, and a lack of erosion prevention work, caused a gradual dispersal of sand and a fast erosion of the shoreline in the nineties.

To avoid the disappearance of the beach, a rainbowing was tried on the Cagliari side in 2002: the sand was reclaimed and sprayed onto the beach using a fleet of dredging ships a few miles from the shore, in an attempt to restore the beach to its original size. However, the result was not as successful as expected: the white, fine-grained sand was replaced by sand of a completely different color, size and consistency. Years later the situation has not improved, and the quartese stretch, which initially remained intact after a few years, has now begun to have the same problems due to the removal of sand by the wind, people and the sea.

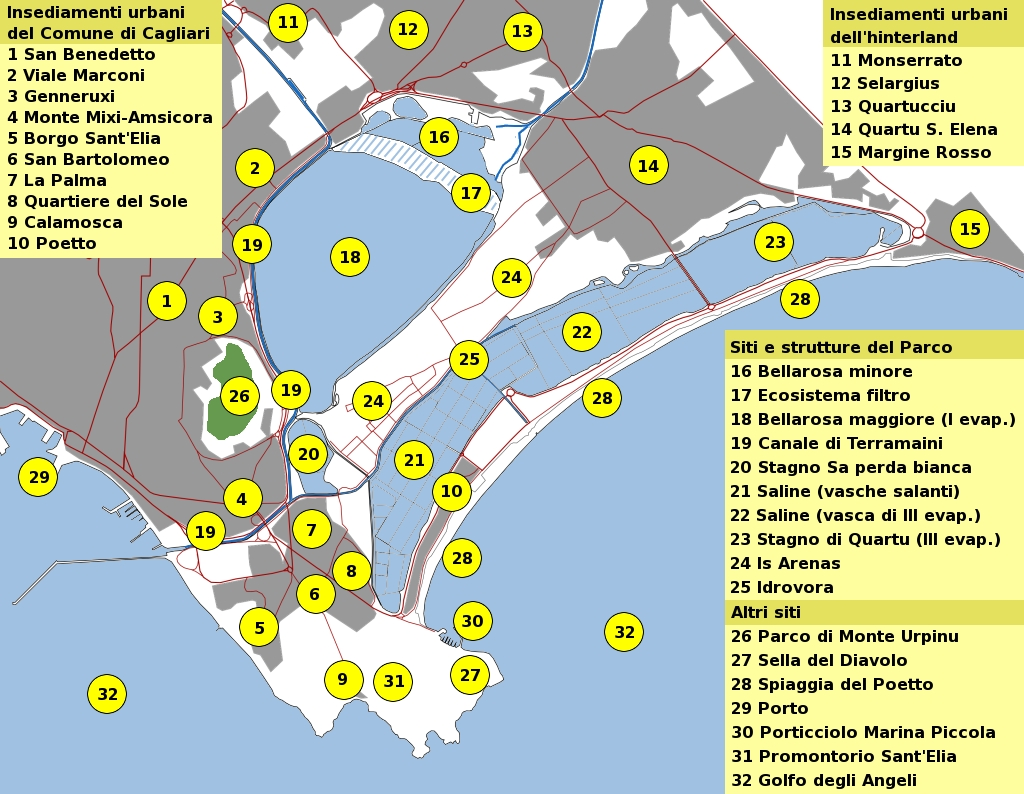
Poetto Location

== Administrative division ==
Poetto is popularly divided into fermate (stops), which means the various stretches of beach are recognized by the number of the bus stop or urban line linking the city centre district. The most popular is the 1st stop, adjacent to the port of Marina Piccola, just below the Sella del Diavolo. Very famous and popular are the 2nd (D'Aquila), 3rd (Lido), 4th and the 6th, home of an old hospital and of major events (championships of beach volleyball, beach soccer, beach football and concerts). Around the 10th stop the coastline belonging to the comune of Quartu Sant'Elena begins.

== Nightlife ==
Poetto is also the entertainment district for Cagliari's nightlife and attracts many tourists. Especially from June to September, one can listen to live music, go to discos, participate in dance lessons or karaoke or simply walk on the seashore. The most popular clubs are Il Lido, Plan B, Sax Beach and Frontemare.

== See also ==
- Golfo degli Angeli
- Quartu Sant'Elena
