= Armungia =

Armungia Armùngia
- Comune
- Comune di Armungia
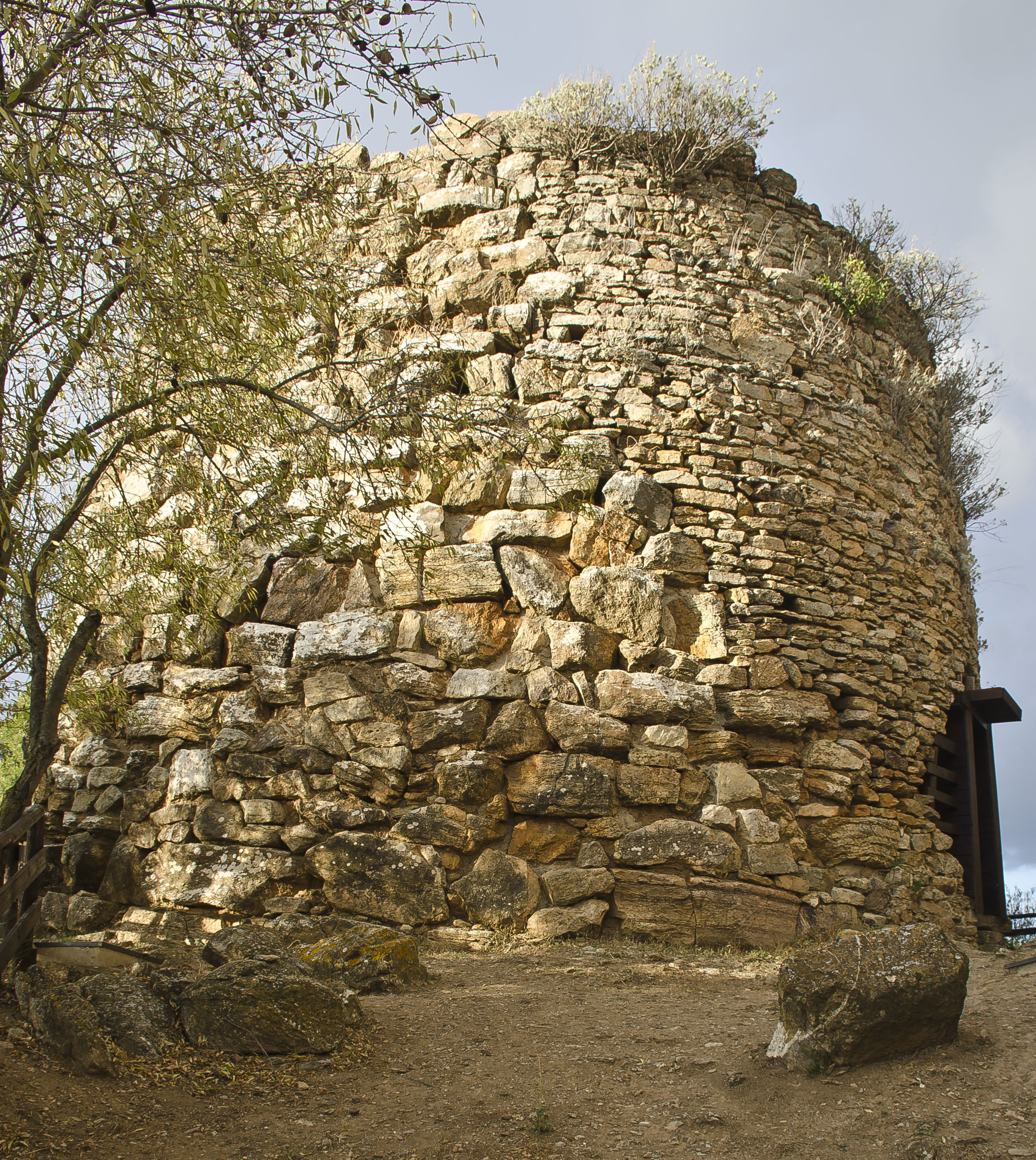
- A nuraghe in the communal territory of Armungia.

- Coat of arms

- Location of Armungia in Sardinia
- Coordinates: 39°31′N 9°23′E
- Country: Italy
- Region: Sardinia
- Metropolitan city: Cagliari

Government
  - Mayor: Donatella Dessì

Area
  - Total: 54.75 km^{2} (21.14 sq mi)
- Elevation: 366 m (1,201 ft)

Population (2026)
  - Total: 395
  - Density: 7.21/km^{2} (18.7/sq mi)
- Demonym: Armungesi
- Time zone: UTC+1 (CET)
  - Summer (DST): UTC+2 (CEST)
- Postal code: 09040
- Dialing code: 070
- Patron saint: Maria Immacolata
- Saint day: First Sunday in May
- Website: Official website

Armungia (Sardinian: Armùngia) is a village and comune (municipality) in the Metropolitan City of Cagliari in the autonomous island region of Sardinia in Italy, located about 40 kilometres (25 mi) northeast of Cagliari. It has 395 inhabitants.

Armungia borders the municipalities of Ballao, San Nicolò Gerrei, Villaputzu, and Villasalto.

== Demographics ==
As of 2026, the population is 395, of which 52.9% are male, and 47.1% are female. Minors make up 7.1% of the population, and seniors make up 38.2%.

Historical population

Year	Pop.	±%
1861	1,025	—
1871	948	−7.5%
1881	1,016	+7.2%
1901	1,167	+14.9%
1911	1,332	+14.1%
1921	1,195	−10.3%
1931	1,172	−1.9%
1936	1,190	+1.5%

Year	Pop.	±%
1951	1,314	+10.4%
1961	1,132	−13.9%
1971	989	−12.6%
1981	789	−20.2%
1991	668	−15.3%
2001	584	−12.6%
2011	489	−16.3%
2021	428	−12.5%

Source: ISTAT

=== Immigration ===
As of 2025, of the known countries of birth of 394 residents, the most numerous are: Italy (379 – 96.2%), Germany (5 – 1.3%), France (4 – 1%).
