= Cape Carbonara =

Promontory on the southeastern tip of Sardinia, Italy

Coordinates: 39°6′18″N 9°30′53″E

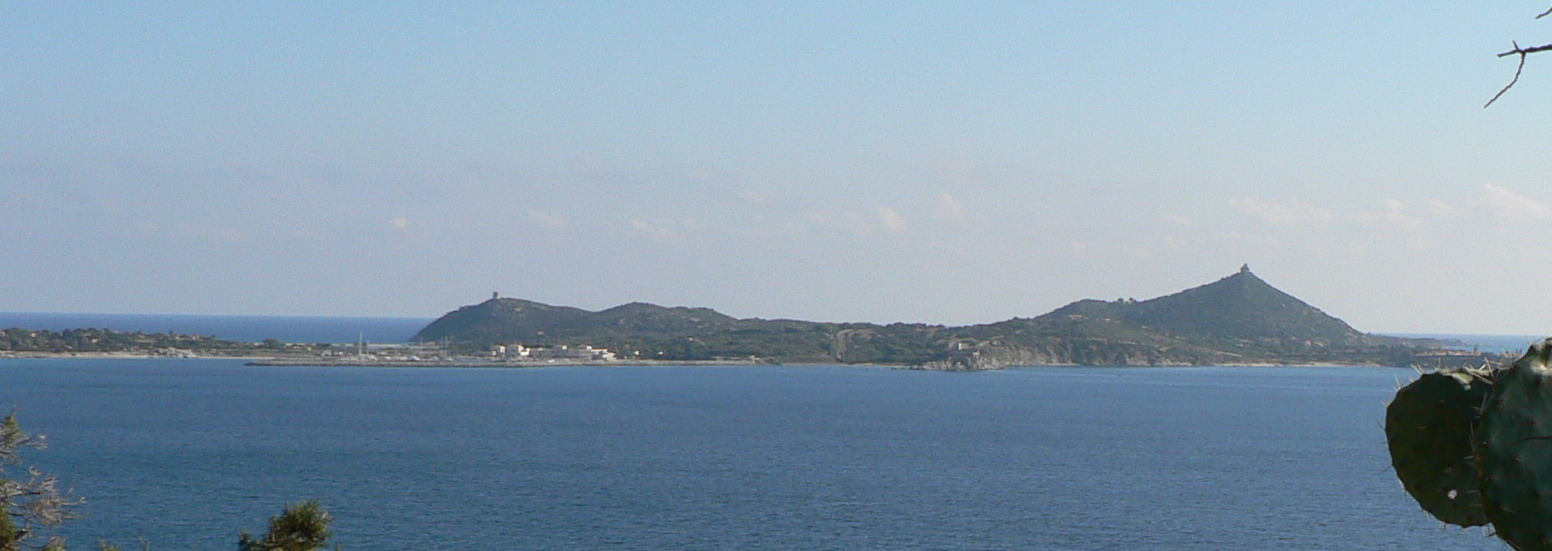
Cape Carbonara.

Cape Carbonara (Italian: Capo Carbonara, Sardinian: Cabo Crabonaxa) is a promontory on the southeastern tip of Sardinia, Italy, which forms the eastern end of the Gulf of Cagliari. Together with the nearby Cavoli Island and Serpentara Island, it is included in the Italian National Marine Park of Capo Carbonara (Italian: Area Marina Protetta).

It is situated within the communal territory of Villasimius, about 6 kilometres (3.7 miles) from the town's center. The promontory has a length of some 3.5 kilometres (2.2 miles) and a maximum width of 1.8 kilometres (1.1 miles).

Sights include the remains of a fortress on the western side, and the beaches Punta Molentis, Is Traias, and Porto Giunco, as well as the Stagno di Notteri with a colony of pink flamingos along the Tyrrhenian Sea on the eastern side.

The promontory also has a lighthouse, run by the Italian Air Force.

== Climate ==
The Climate is warm and semi-arid, classified as BSh in Köppen climate classification, with low precipitation throughout the year. It is considered the driest region in Italy.

Climate data for Capo Carbonara (1991-2020 normals and extremes) (Note: Dew Point temperatures are for the 1981-2010 period)
Month	Jan	Feb	Mar	Apr	May	Jun	Jul	Aug	Sep	Oct	Nov	Dec	Year
Record high °C (°F)	21.2 (70.2)	23.2 (73.8)	25.2 (77.4)	27.0 (80.6)	32.8 (91.0)	35.6 (96.1)	37.6 (99.7)	39.0 (102.2)	34.2 (93.6)	30.4 (86.7)	26.8 (80.2)	23.0 (73.4)	39.0 (102.2)
Mean daily maximum °C (°F)	14.9 (58.8)	15.1 (59.2)	16.7 (62.1)	18.8 (65.8)	22.4 (72.3)	27.1 (80.8)	30.4 (86.7)	31.3 (88.3)	27.8 (82.0)	24.2 (75.6)	19.4 (66.9)	16.0 (60.8)	22.0 (71.6)
Daily mean °C (°F)	12.3 (54.1)	12.2 (54.0)	13.7 (56.7)	15.5 (59.9)	19.0 (66.2)	23.4 (74.1)	26.6 (79.9)	27.5 (81.5)	24.3 (75.7)	21.1 (70.0)	16.8 (62.2)	13.5 (56.3)	18.8 (65.9)
Mean daily minimum °C (°F)	9.9 (49.8)	9.5 (49.1)	10.8 (51.4)	12.6 (54.7)	15.9 (60.6)	19.9 (67.8)	22.9 (73.2)	23.9 (75.0)	21.0 (69.8)	18.1 (64.6)	14.2 (57.6)	11.1 (52.0)	15.8 (60.5)
Average precipitation mm (inches)	24.5 (0.96)	20.4 (0.80)	25.6 (1.01)	27.6 (1.09)	20.7 (0.81)	4.5 (0.18)	2.8 (0.11)	7.8 (0.31)	30.9 (1.22)	33.1 (1.30)	48.6 (1.91)	32.5 (1.28)	279 (10.98)
Average precipitation days (≥ 1.0 mm)	4.75	4.79	4	4.48	3	1.2	0.4	1.07	3.53	4.14	6.03	5.89	43.28
Average snowy days	0	0.1	0	0	0	0	0	0	0	0	0	0.1	0.2
Average relative humidity (%)	76.4	75.2	75.3	73.2	71.0	69.1	67.9	69.0	71.2	73.2	75.6	75.5	72.7
Average dew point °C (°F)	8.2 (46.8)	7.6 (45.7)	8.9 (48.0)	10.4 (50.7)	13.5 (56.3)	17.4 (63.3)	18.9 (66.0)	20.9 (69.6)	17.9 (64.2)	17.8 (64.0)	12.5 (54.5)	8.8 (47.8)	13.6 (56.4)
Source 1: NOAA, (Dew Point 1981-2010)
Source 2: Meteomanz(snow days 2000-2024)
