= Burcei =

Burcei Brucei (Sardinian)
- Comune
- Comune di Burcei
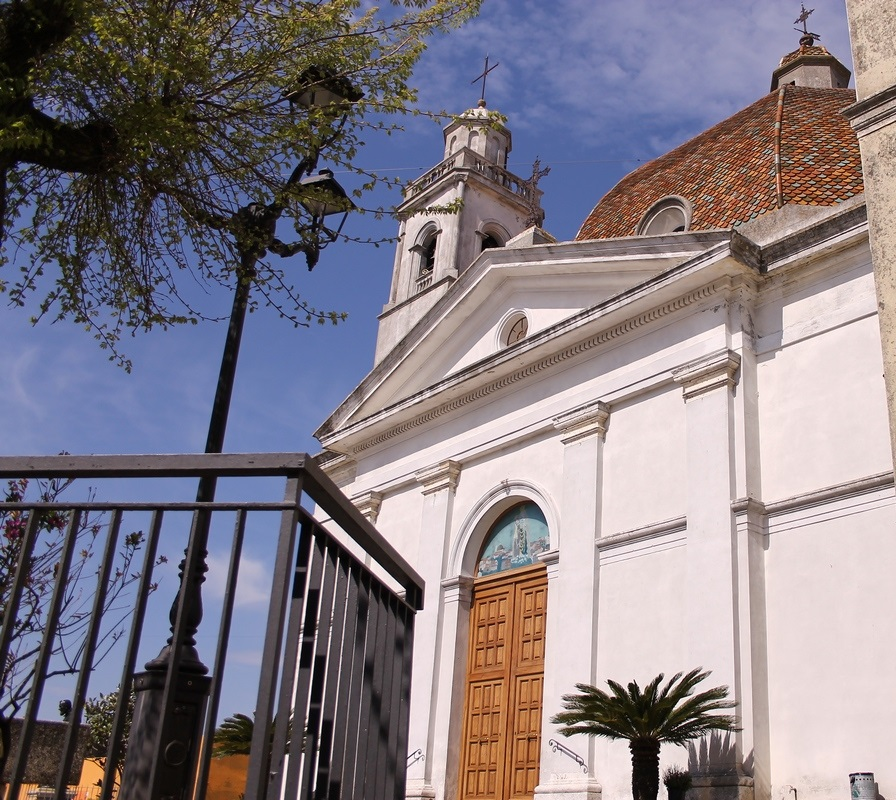

- Coat of arms

- Location within Sardinia
- Coordinates: 39°21′N 9°22′E
- Country: Italy
- Region: Sardinia
- Metropolitan city: Cagliari (CA)

Government
  - Mayor: Giuseppe Caria

Area
  - Total: 94.8 km^{2} (36.6 sq mi)
- Elevation: 648 m (2,126 ft)

Population (December 2004)
  - Total: 2,943
  - Density: 31.0/km^{2} (80.4/sq mi)
- Demonym(s): Burceresi; Bruceresus
- Time zone: UTC+1 (CET)
  - Summer (DST): UTC+2 (CEST)
- Postal code: 09040
- Dialing code: 070
- Website: Official website

Burcei (Sardinian: Brucei) is a comune (municipality) in the Metropolitan City of Cagliari in the Italian region Sardinia, located about 25 kilometres (16 mi) northeast of Cagliari.

Burcei borders the following municipalities: San Vito, Sinnai, Villasalto.
