= Golfo di Cagliari =

Coordinates: 39°06′N 9°12′E

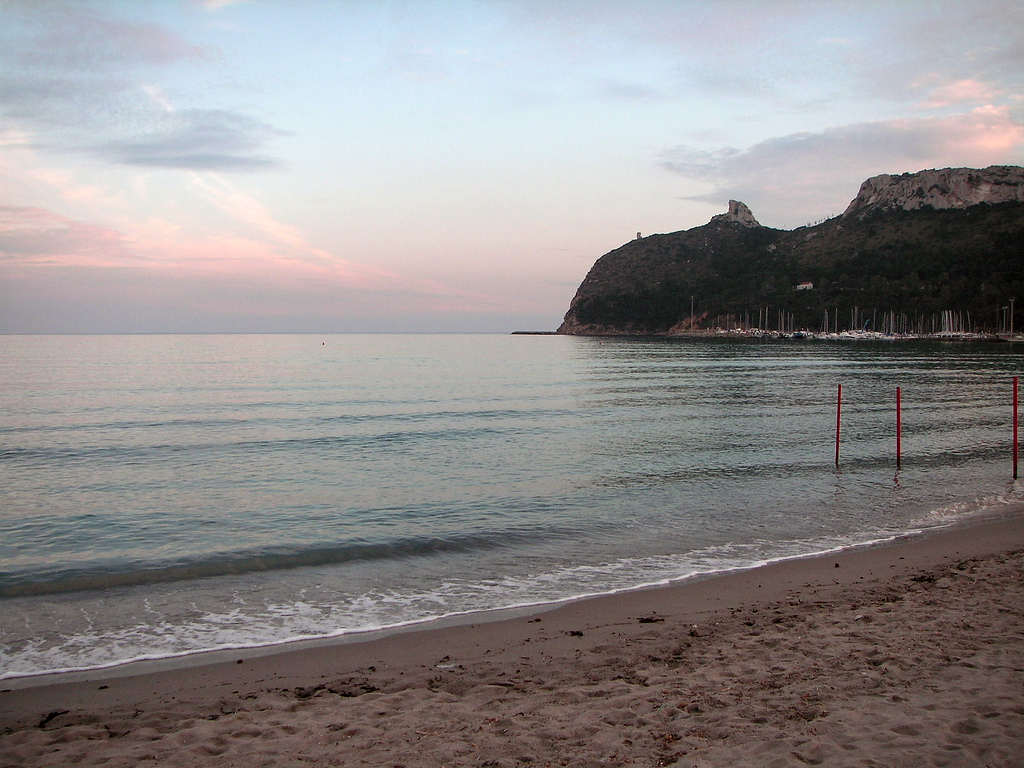
"Sella del Diavolo" (Devil's saddle) promontory seen from the Poetto beach near Cagliari.

The Golfo di Cagliari (English: Gulf of Cagliari, Sardinian: Golfu de Casteddu), also known as Golfo degli Angeli (English: Gulf of the Angels) is a large bay in southern Sardinia, Italy, facing the Tyrrhenian Sea. It is enclosed between the Cape Carbonara from east and the Isola dei Cavoli and Capo Spartivento from west. Its coasts are partly sandy and partly rocky, including only a few harbours. In the middle of the gulf is a Sant'Elia promontory, part of the territory of Cagliari, Sardinia's capital, which also houses the most important port.

Other comuni on the gulf include Domus de Maria, Pula, Villa San Pietro, Sarroch, Capoterra, Quartu Sant'Elena, Sinnai and Villasimius. The most famous beach is that of Poetto, near Cagliari, while important wetlands are the Stagni ("ponds") of Capoterra, Cagliari and Molentargius. Also notable is the archaeological site of Nora.
