= Port of Cagliari =

Port of Cagliari Porto di Cagliari
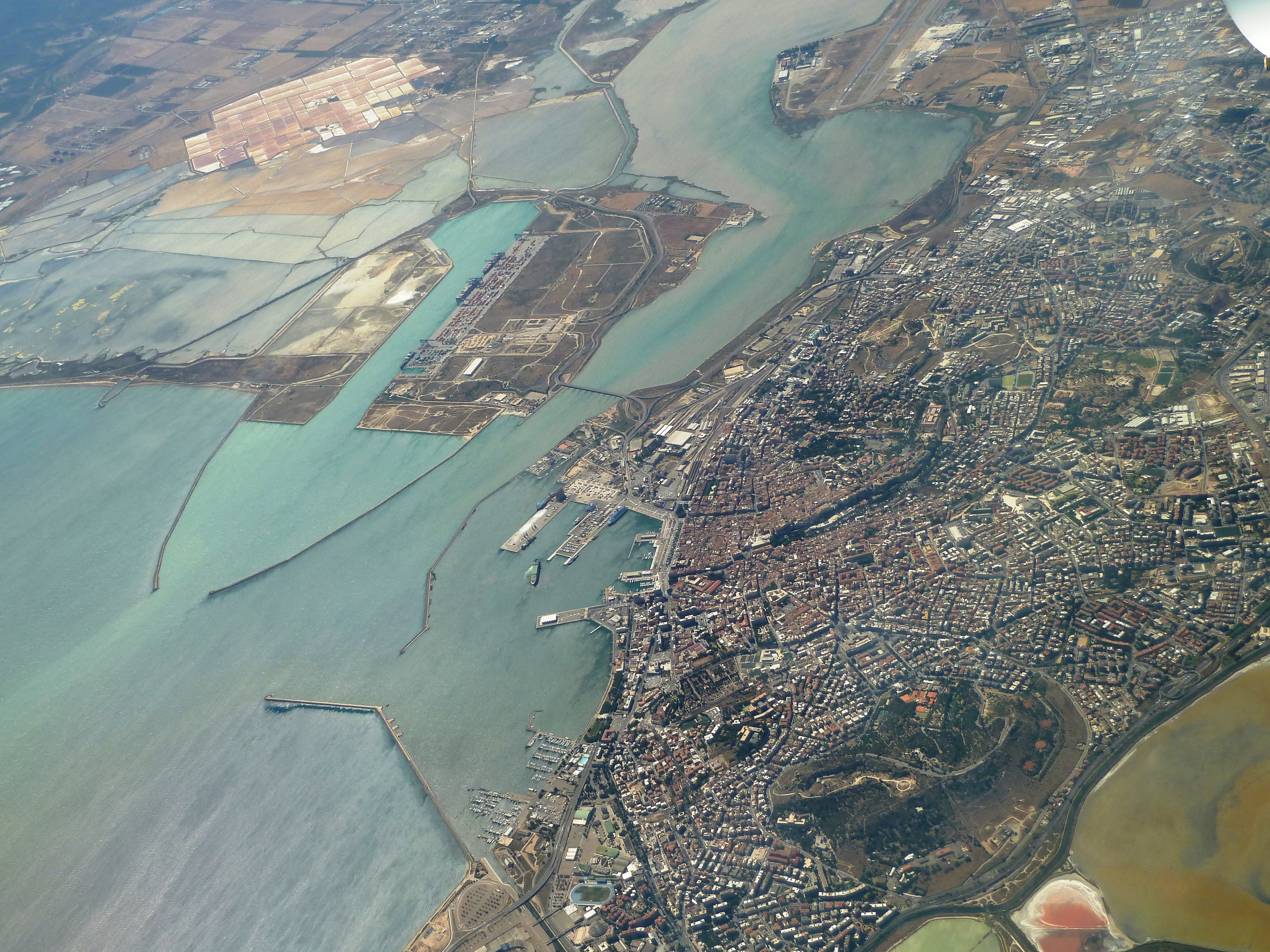
- 2012
- Click on the map for a fullscreen view
- Location in Italy
- Native name: Port of Cagliari

Location
- Country: Italy
- Location: Cagliari, Sardinia
- Coordinates: 39°12′47″N 9°06′39″E
- UN/LOCODE: IT CAG

Details
- Type of harbour: Commercial, turistic port

Statistics
- Website www.porto.cagliari.it

The Port of Cagliari is one of the largest Italian seaports and one of the largest seaports in the Mediterranean Sea basin, with an annual traffic capacity of around 50 million tonnes of cargo and 1,000,000 TEU's.

The port is also an important employer in the area, with more than 3,000 employees who provide services to more than 5,500 ships every year.

== History ==
The Port of Cagliari is in the west of the Mediterranean Sea, a position which has made it a commercial and strategic junction for over 2,500 years. Founded by the Phoenicians, launched by the Carthaginians and flourished under the Romans, for centuries the port in Cagliari has been in a continuous expansion program.

Thanks to the large spaces available and its enormous operating potential, the Port of Cagliari can accommodate heavy commercial traffic by moving conventional goods, bulk goods, Ro-Ro traffic and transshipping containerized goods, all which are flanked by passenger services, fishing, yachting and cruise activities.

On 20 June, 2019, the Cict, a subsidiary of the Contship Italia Group, announced the full dismission of its activities in the Porto Canale after 23 years of operations and the start of a collective firing procedure for the around 200-300 workers of the company.

== Description ==
The Port of Cagliari is situated 18 km from the Gibraltar-Suez ideal line and represents one of the poles for transshipping activities in the Western Mediterranean sea.

The territorial district managed by the Cagliari Port Authority extends for approximately 30 km of coastline; its structure is divided into two areas: the historic port and the canal port.

The historic port has 5,800 meters of quay, which serves commercial and Ro-Ro traffic as well as passenger ships. The canal port has 1,600 meters of quay and has five berths for transshipping and Ro-Ro traffic.

These two ports are flanked by berths for the petrochemical and oil industry, which accommodate mooring for 17 ships at a time.

== Statistics ==
In 2007 the Port of Cagliari handled 35,261,756 tonnes of cargo and 547,336 TEU's making it one of the busiest cargo ports in Italy and one of the largest container ports in the country.

General statistics between 2004 - 2007
Year	2004	2005	2006	2007
RoRo (nr of units)	107,797	105,522	98,045	81,676
Liquid bulk^{*}	22,858,950	26,984,884	26,033,123	26,843,064
Dry bulk^{*}	9,378,541	10,892,192	10,100,948	8,418,692
Nr of passengers	498,050	453,042	351,195	393,823
Containers (TEU's)	501,194	639,049	687,657	547,336
Ships (nr)	6,797	7,274	6,248	5,573
Total^{*}'	32,237,491	37,877,076	36,134,071	35,261,756

* figures in tonnes

== Terminals ==
=== Container ===
The Cagliari International Container Terminal or (CICT) is the largest container terminal in the port with an annual traffic capacity of 1,000,000 TEU's.
