= Villasimius =

Villasimius Crabonaxa (Sardinian)
- Comune
- Comune di Villasimius
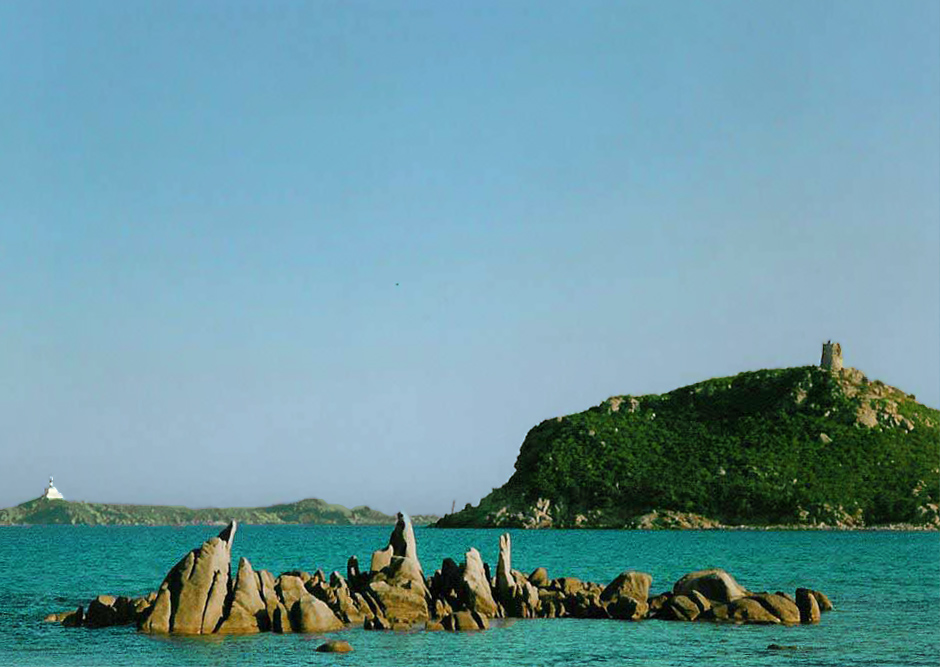

- Coat of arms

- Location within Sardinia
- Coordinates: 39°08′N 09°31′E
- Country: Italy
- Region: Sardinia
- Metropolitan city: Cagliari (CA)

Government
  - Mayor: Gianluca Dessì

Area
  - Total: 58.2 km^{2} (22.5 sq mi)
- Elevation: 41 m (135 ft)

Population (30 November 2017)
  - Total: 3,710
  - Density: 63.7/km^{2} (165/sq mi)
- Demonym: Villasimiesi
- Time zone: UTC+1 (CET)
  - Summer (DST): UTC+2 (CEST)
- Postal code: 09049
- Dialing code: 070
- Patron saint: Saint Raphael
- Saint day: 24 October
- Website: Official website

Villasimius (Italian: [villasiˈmiːus]; Sardinian: Crabonaxa [kɾaβɔˈnaʒa]), is a comune (municipality) in the Metropolitan City of Cagliari in the Italian region of Sardinia, located about 35 kilometres (22 mi) east of Cagliari.

== History ==
Due to its strategically important site, Villasimius' territory was inhabited since prehistoric times, as testified by nuraghe (19th–6th centuries BC), Phoenician-Carthaginian (7th–2nd centuries BC) and Roman (3rd century BC – 6th century AD) remains.

During the giudicati (Sardinian kingdoms), Aragonese and Spanish reigns, the territory suffered numerous pirate raids and became increasingly depopulated. The village name was, at least from the 13th century, Carbonara; this was repopulated from the early 19th century when it was under the Kingdom of Sardinia-Piedmont, becoming a comune in 1838. Villasimius' economy was traditionally based on agriculture and shepherding and, from 1875 to the extraction of granite. Its tourism industry began in the late 1960s and is now Villasimius' main economic activity.

In 1998 the Capo Carbonara National Marine Park was created. It encompasses all the waters surrounding the headlands in the eastern Gulf of Cagliari, from Villasimius' western border with Solanas, to its northern border with Castiadas.

== Main sights ==
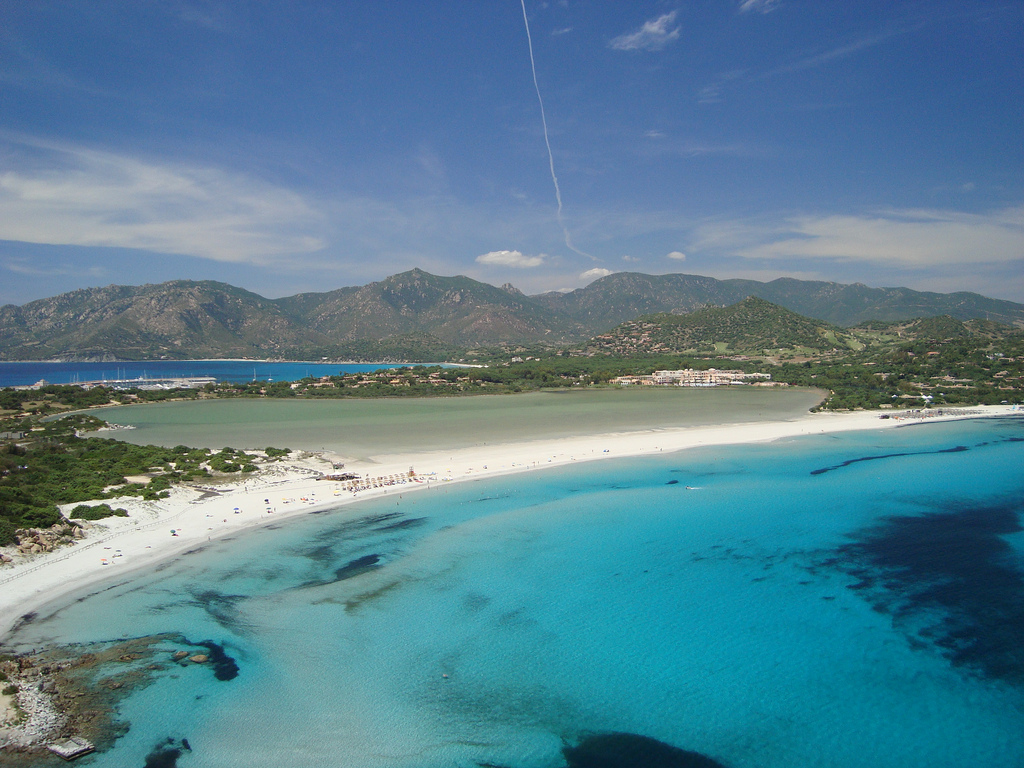
Villasimius beach

=== Beaches ===
The area's most important beaches are Cala Burroni, Cala Caterina, Campus, Piscadeddus, Porto Giunco, Porto Sa Ruxi, Punta Molentis, Simius, Spiaggia del Riso, Timi Ama.
