= Tourism in Italy =

The Colosseum of Rome, one of the most popular tourist attractions in the world. Rome is the 3rd most visited city in Europe and the 12th in the world, with 9.4 million arrivals in 2017.

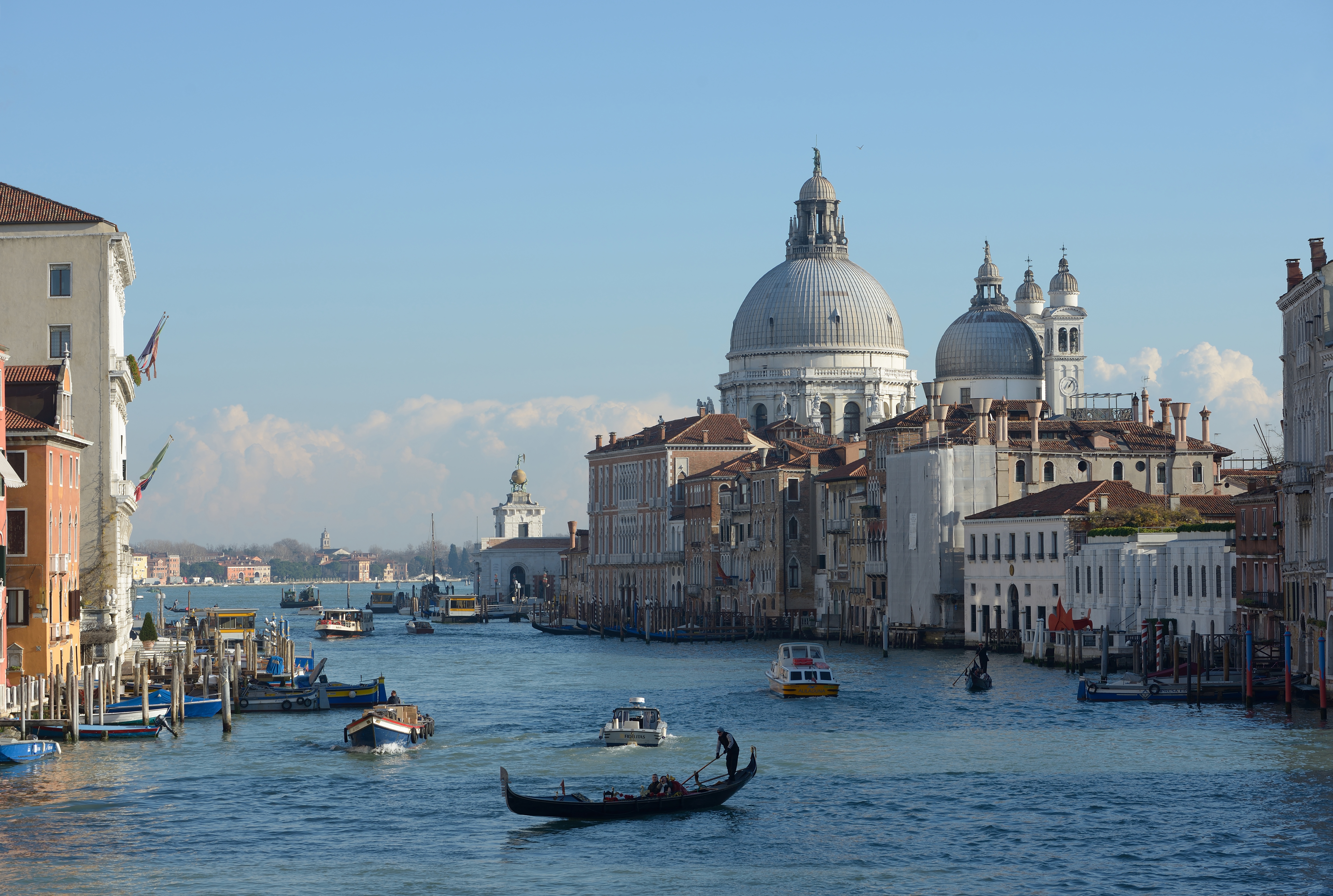
The Grand Canal of Venice. The city of Venice is among the world's top 100 destinations.

The Santa Maria del Fiore cathedral in Florence by Filippo Brunelleschi, which has the largest brick dome in the world. The city of Florence is among the world's top 100 destinations.

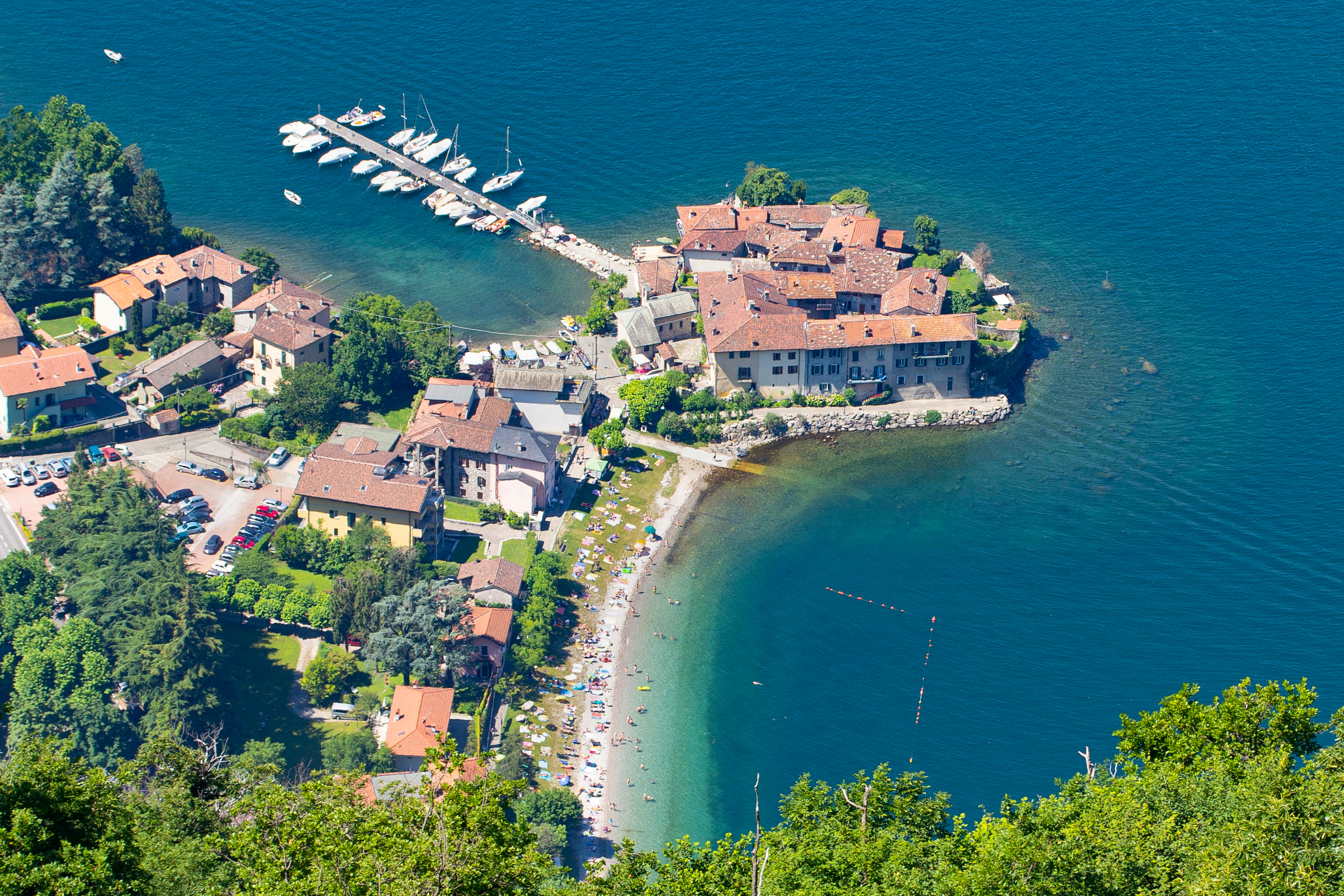
Lierna, locality in the central area of Lake Como

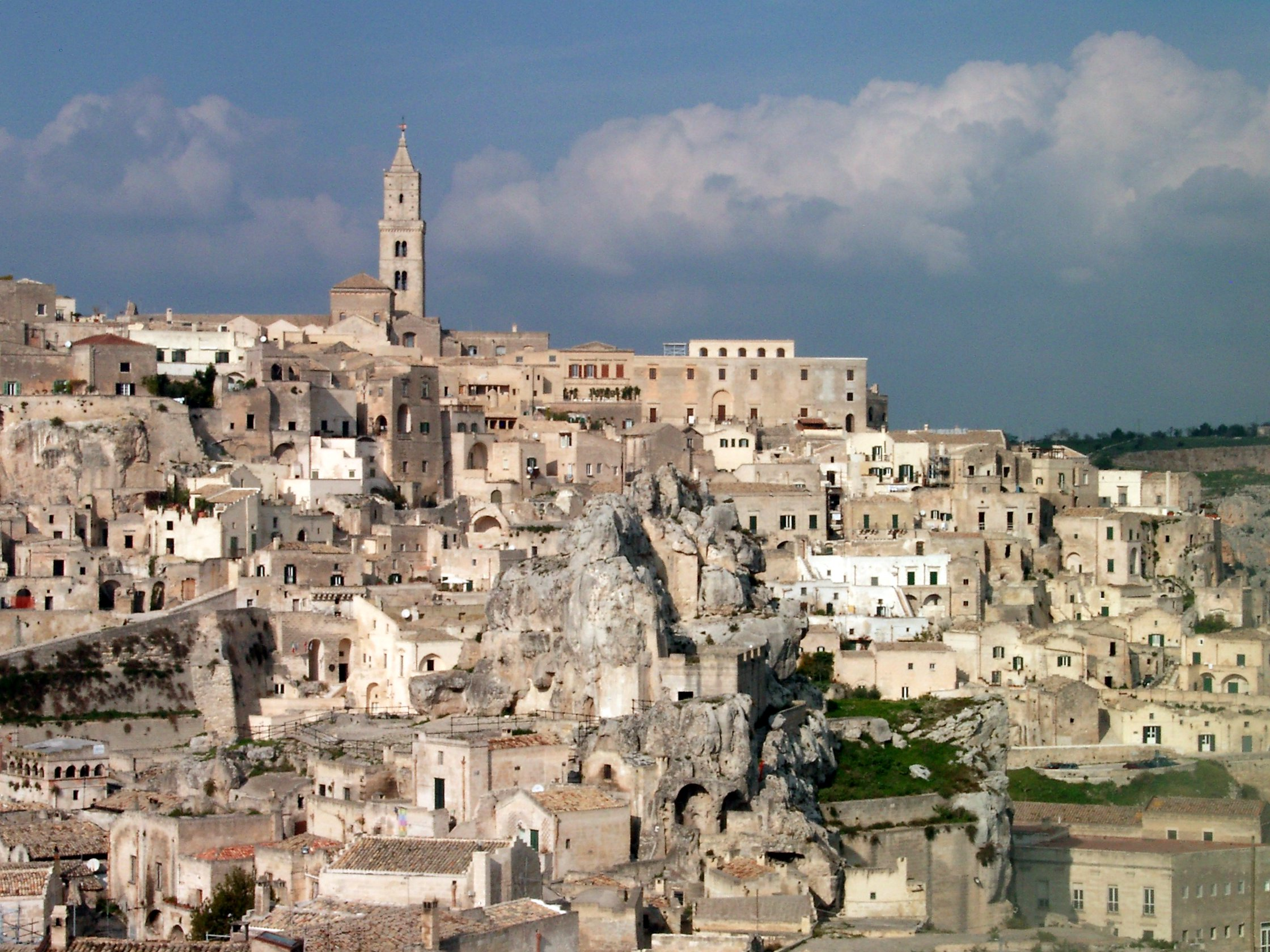
The Sassi di Matera, in Basilicata

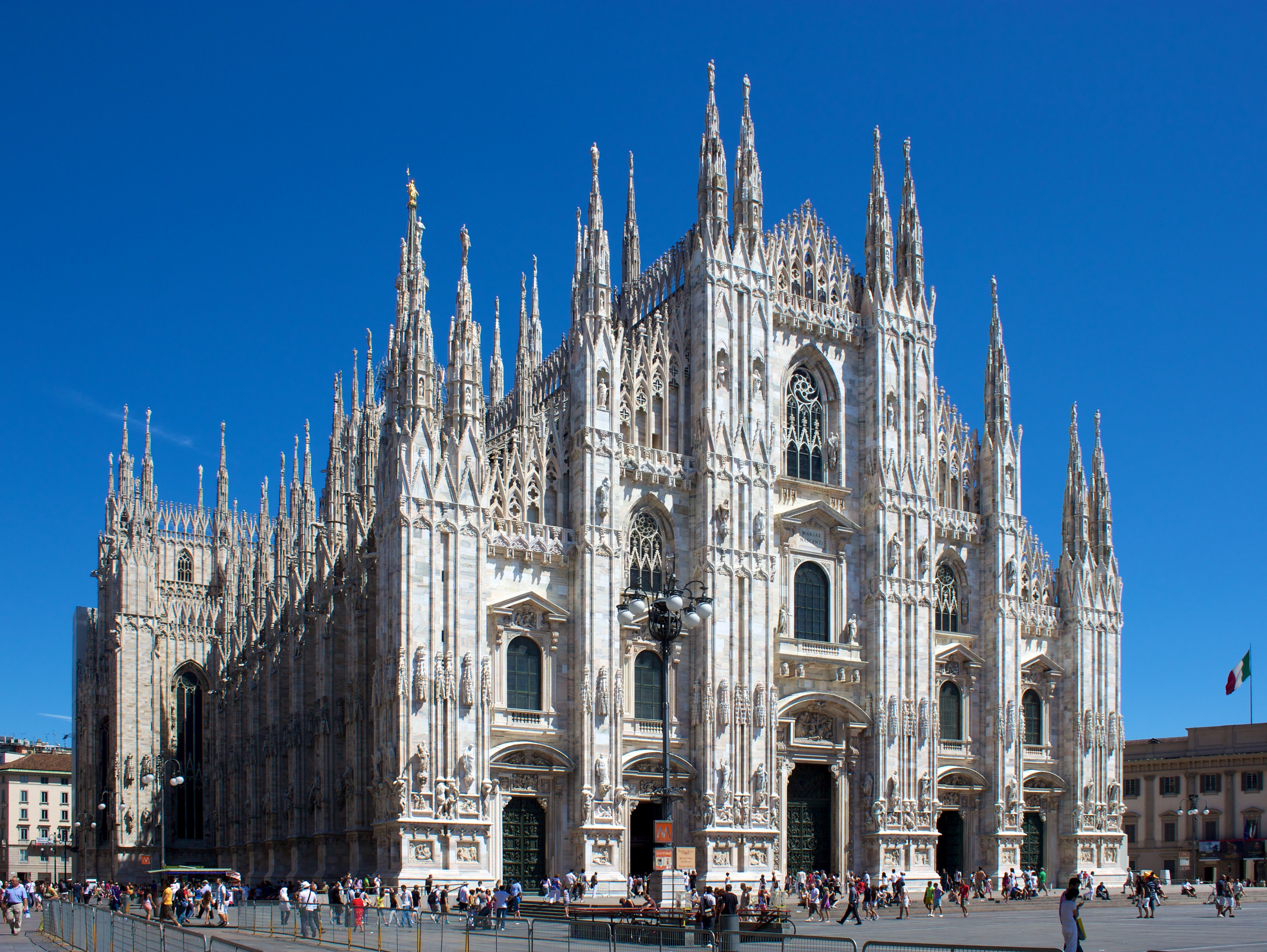
Milan Cathedral is a busy tourist spot in Milan. It is the world's 5th biggest cathedral and took over five centuries to complete. Milan is the 5th most visited city in Europe and the 16th in the world, with 8.81 million tourists in 2018.

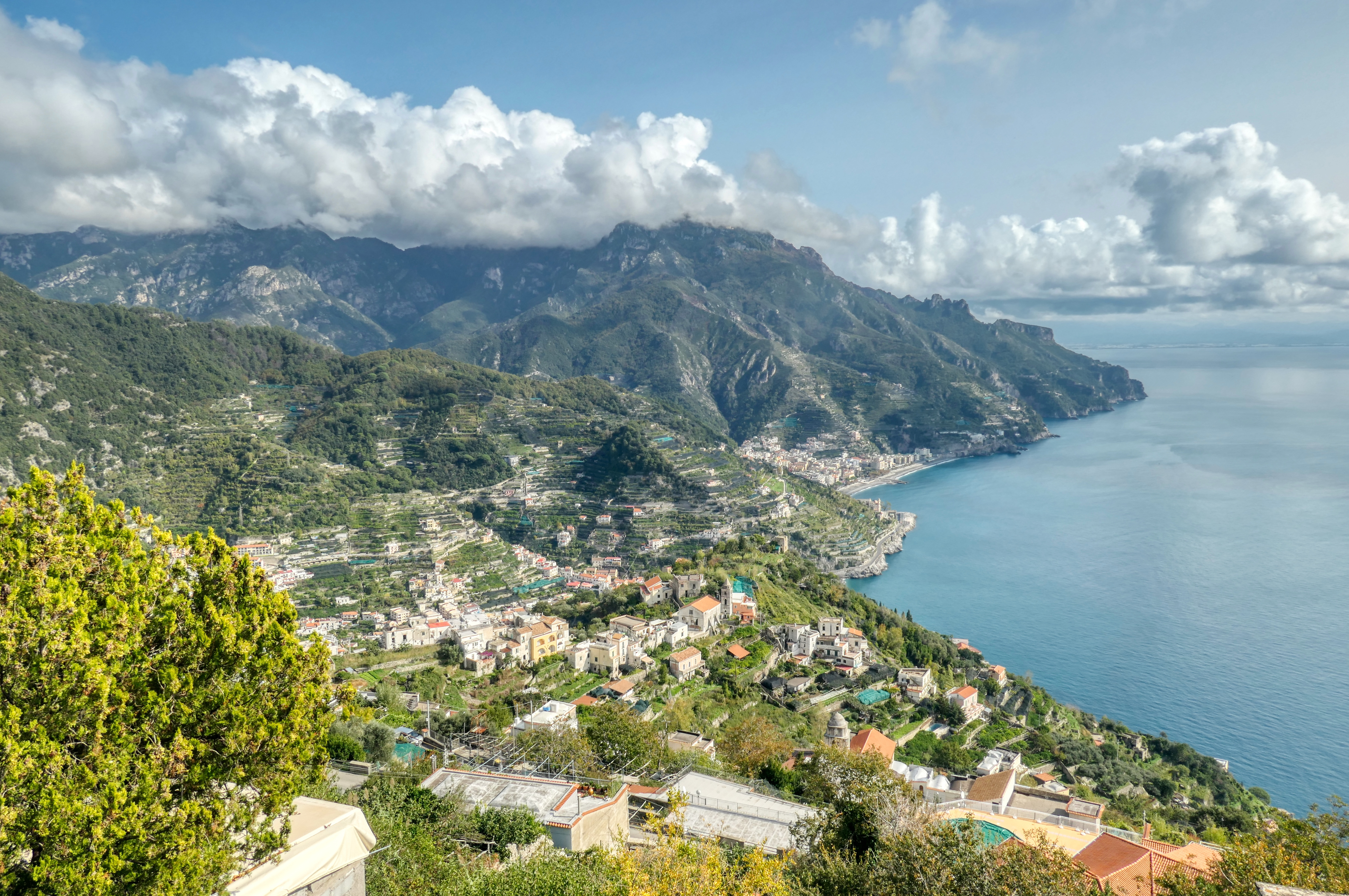
The Amalfi Coast seen from Ravello, in Campania, one of the most popular tourist destinations in Italy

Tourism in Italy is one of the largest economic sectors of the country. With 88 million international tourists in 2025, Italy is the most visited country in international tourism arrivals. According to 2018 estimates by the Bank of Italy, the tourism sector directly generates more than five per cent of the national GDP (13 per cent when also considering the indirectly generated GDP) and represents over six per cent of the employed. As of 2023, Italy is the world's ninth-largest travel and tourism market, with the sector contributing approximately $231.3 billion to the country's GDP.

The first people to visit the Italian peninsula for tourism were aristocrats on the Grand Tour, which began in the 17th century and flourished n the 18th and 19th centuries. During this period, European aristocrats, many of them British and French, travelled throughout Europe. Italy's main tourist attractions include its culture, cuisine, fashion, architecture, and art. It is also a popular destination for Christmas holidays. Winter and summer tourism are present in many locations in the Alps and the Apennines, while seaside tourism is widespread in coastal locations along the Mediterranean Sea. Small Italian villages of historical and artistic interest are promoted through the association I Borghi più belli d'Italia (literally "The Most Beautiful Villages of Italy"). Italy is the country with the highest number of UNESCO World Heritage Sites in the world (61). Out of Italy's 61 heritage sites, 55 are cultural and 6 are natural.

According to ISTAT, in 2017, there were 32,988 hotels with 1,133,452 rooms and 2,239,446 beds. As for non-hotel facilities (campsites, tourist villages, accommodations for rent, agritourism, etc.), in 2017 their number was 171,915 with 2,798,352 beds. The tourist flow is concentrated in coastal resorts, which account for 53 percent of the total. The best-equipped Italian municipalities are Grosseto for farmhouses, with 217 facilities; Vieste for campsites and tourist villages, with 84; and Cortina d’Ampezzo for mountain huts, with 20.

== History ==
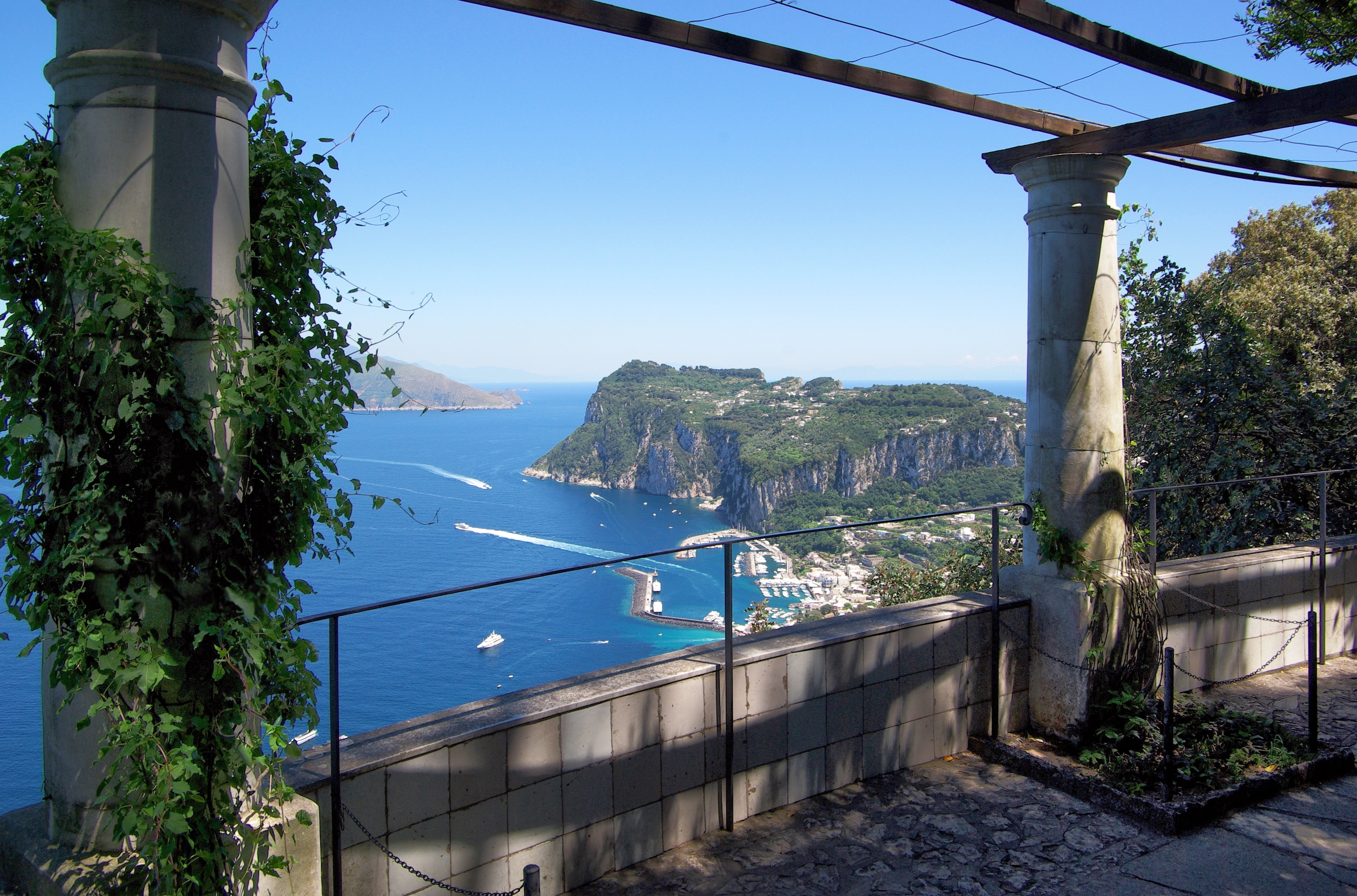
Islands such as Capri became popular in the late 14th century and first decade of the 19th century.

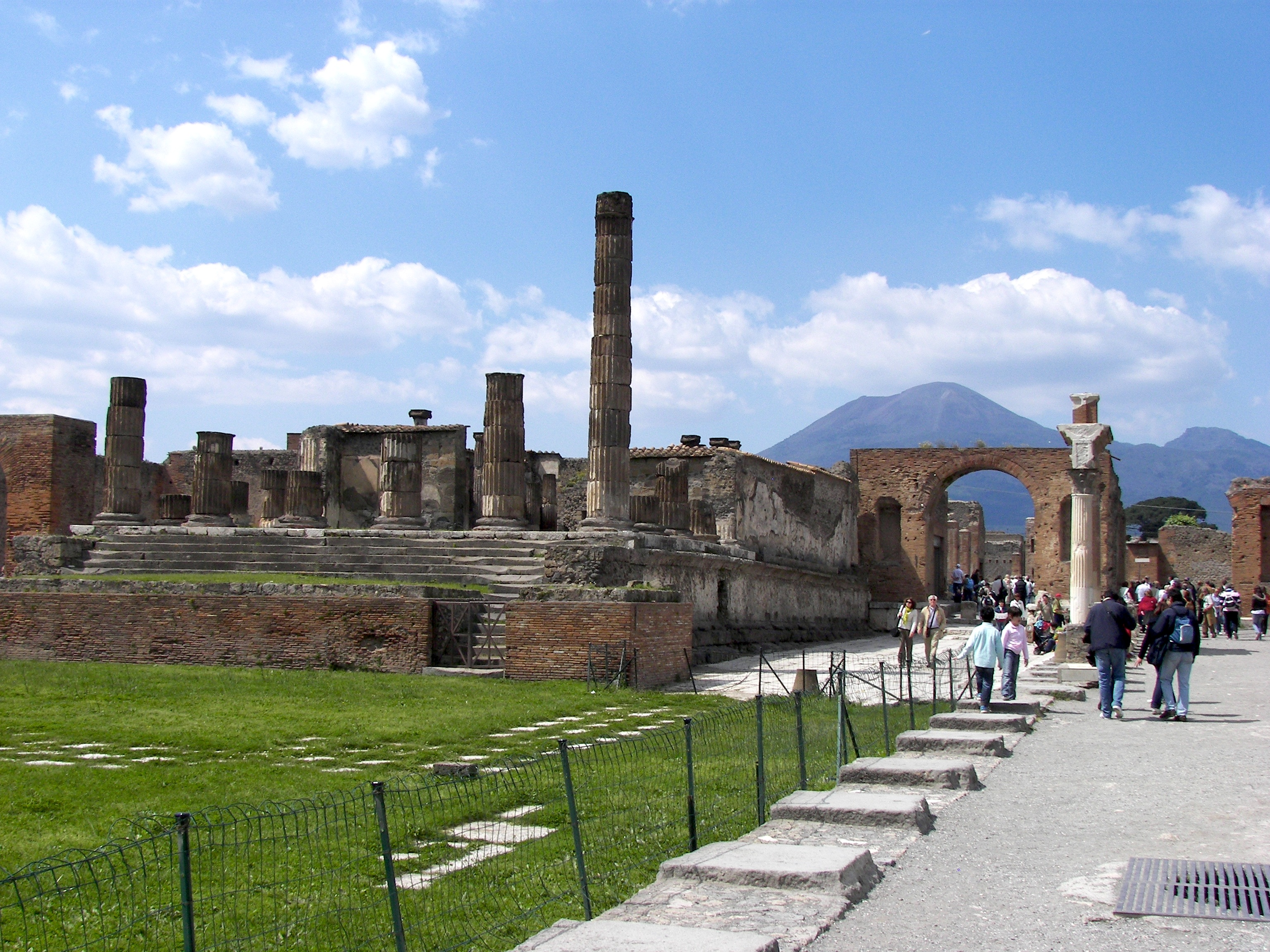
The Forum of Pompeii with Vesuvius in the distance. Pompeii is Italy's third and the world's 48th most visited destination, with over 2.5 million tourists a year.

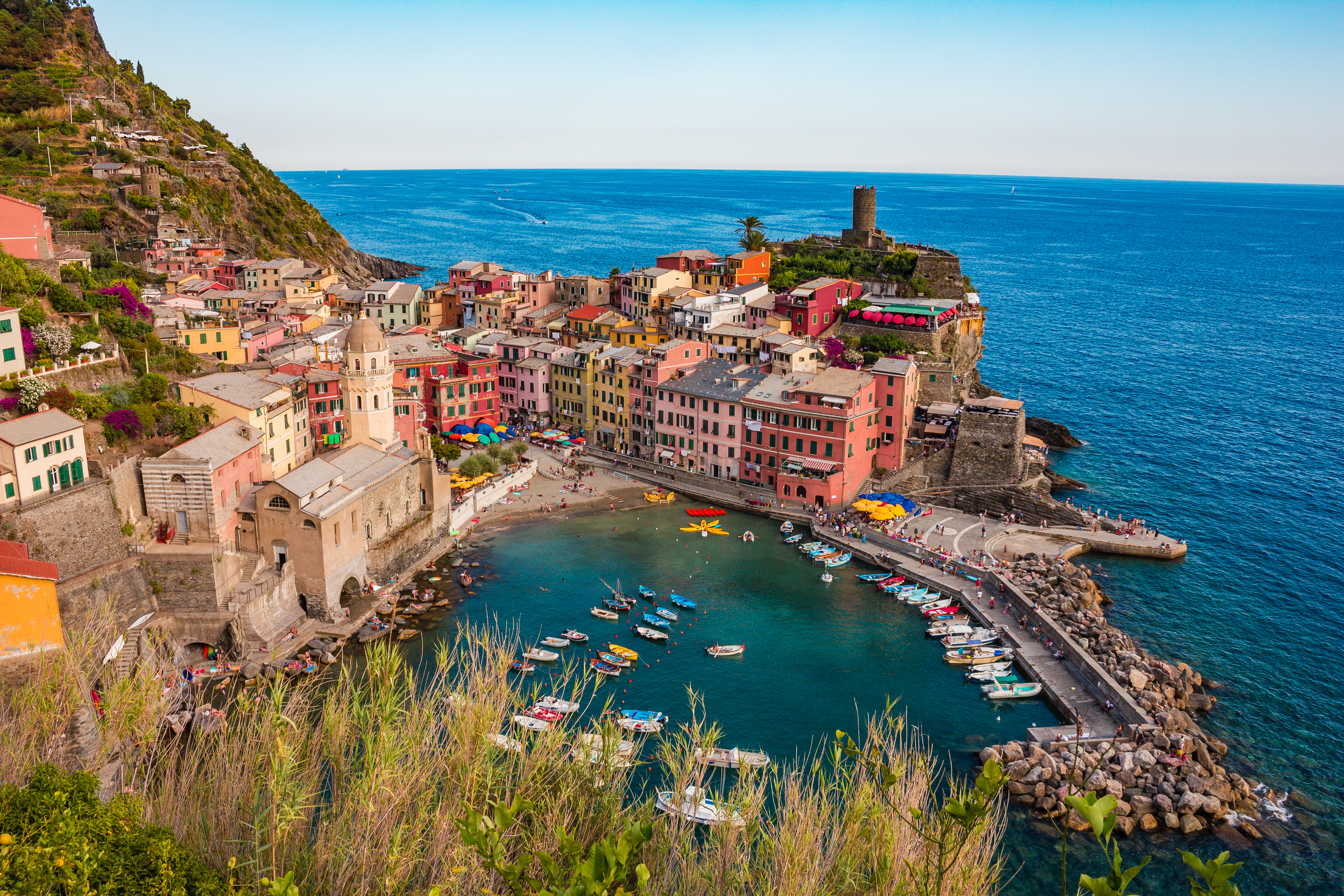
Cinque Terre on the Italian Riviera, one of the most popular tourist destinations in Italy

=== Beginnings ===
People have visited Italy for centuries, yet the first to visit the peninsula for touristic reasons were aristocrats during the Grand Tour, beginning in the 17th century, and flourishing in the 18th and the 19th century.

Rome, as the capital of the Roman Empire, attracted thousands to the city and country from all over the empire, which included a great part of Europe, Western Asia and Northern Africa. Traders and merchants came to Italy from several different parts of the world. When the empire fell in 476 AD, Rome was no longer the epicentre of European politics and culture; on the other hand, it was the base of the papacy, which then governed the growing Christian religion, meaning that Rome remained one of Europe's major places of pilgrimage. Pilgrims, for centuries and still today, would come to the city, and that would have been the early equivalent of "tourism" or "religious tourism". The trade empires of Venice, Pisa and Genoa meant that several traders, businessmen and merchants from all over the world would also regularly come to Italy. In the 16th and early 17th centuries, with the height of the Renaissance, several students came to Italy to study Italian architecture.

=== Grand Tour ===
Real "tourism" only affected Italy in the second half of the 17th century, with the beginning of the Grand Tour. This was a period in which European aristocrats, many of whom were British, visited parts of Europe, with Italy as a key destination. For Italy, this was in order to study ancient architecture, local culture and to admire the natural beauties. The Grand Tour was in essence triggered by the book Voyage to Italy, by Roman Catholic priest Richard Lassels, and published in 1670. Due to the Grand Tour, tourism became even more prevalent – making Italy one of the most desired destinations for millions of people. Once inside what would be modern-day Italy, these tourists would begin by visiting Turin for a short while. On the way there, Milan was also a popular stop, yet a trip to the city was not considered essential, and several passed by or simply stayed for a short period of time. If a person came via boat, then they would remain for a few days in Genoa. Yet, the main destination in Northern Italy was Venice, which was considered a vital stop, as well as cities around it such as Verona, Vicenza and Padua.

As the Tour went on, Tuscan cities were also very important itinerary stops. Florence was a major attraction, and other Tuscan towns, such as Siena, Pisa, Lucca and San Gimignano, were also considered important destinations. The most prominent stop in Central Italy, however, was Rome, a major centre for the arts and culture, as well as an essential city for a Grand Tourist. Later, they would go down to the Bay of Naples, and after their discovery in 1710, Pompeii and Herculaneum were popular too. Sicily was considered a significant part of the trail, and several, such as Goethe, visited the island.

=== Mass tourism ===
Throughout the 17th to 18th centuries, the Grand Tour was mainly reserved for academics or the elite. Nevertheless, circa 1840, rail transport was introduced and the Grand Tour started to fall slightly out of vogue; hence, the first form of mass tourism was introduced. The 1840s saw the period in which the Victorian middle classes toured the country. Several Americans were also able to visit Italy, and many more tourists came to the peninsula. Places such as Venice, Florence, Rome, Naples and Sicily still remained the top attractions.

Like many other Europeans, Italians rely heavily on public transport. Italy is a relatively small country and distances are reduced.

As the century progressed, fewer cultural visits were made, and there was an increase in tourists coming for Italy's nature and weather. The first seaside resorts, such as those on the Ligurian coast, around Venice, coastal Tuscany and Amalfi, became popular. This vogue of summer holidays heightened in the fin-de-siècle epoch, when numerous "Grand Hotels" were built (including places such as Sanremo, Lido di Venezia, Viareggio and Forte dei Marmi). Islands such as Capri, Ischia, Procida and Elba grew in popularity, and the Northern lakes, such as Lake Como, Maggiore and Garda were more frequently visited. Tourism to Italy remained very popular until the late-1920s and early-1930s, when, with the Great Depression and economic crisis, several could no longer afford to visit the country; the increasing political instability meant that fewer tourists came. Only old touristic groups, such as the Scorpioni, remained alive.

After a big slump in tourism beginning from approximately 1929 and lasting after World War II, Italy returned to its status as a popular resort, with the Italian economic miracle and raised living standards; films such as La Dolce Vita were successful abroad, and their depiction of the country's perceived idyllic life helped raise Italy's international profile. By this point, with higher incomes, Italians could also afford to go on holiday; coastline resorts saw a soar in visitors, especially in Romagna. Many cheap hotels and pensioni (hostels) were built in the 1960s, and with the rise of wealth, by now, even a working-class Italian family could afford a holiday somewhere along the coast. The late 1960s also brought mass popularity to mountain holidays and skiing; in Piedmont and the Aosta Valley, numerous ski resorts and chalets started being built. The 1970s also brought a wave of foreign tourists to Italy in search of a sentimental trip, since Mediterranean destinations saw a rise in global visitors.

Despite this, by the late 1970s and early 1980s, economic crises and political instability meant that there was a significant slump in the Italian tourist industry, as destinations in the Far East or South America rose in popularity. Yet, by the late-1980s and early-1990s, tourism saw a return to popularity, with cities such as Milan becoming more popular destinations. Milan saw a rise in tourists since it was ripening its position as a worldwide fashion capital.

== Overtourism ==
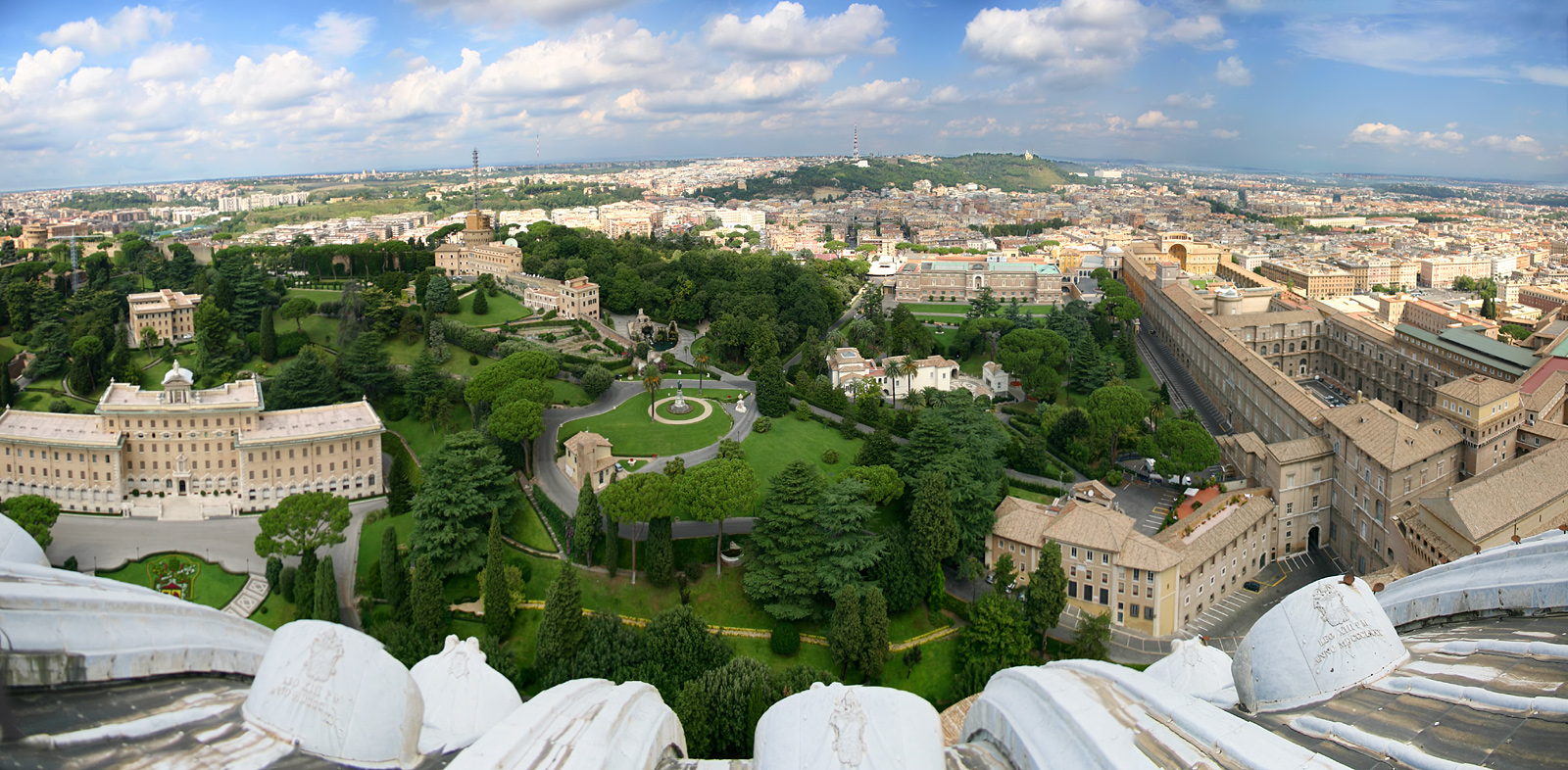
View of Vatican City, Rome

Several popular tourism destinations in Italy – including Venice, the Vatican City, and the Cinque Terre – have reported issues with overtourism.

In particular, Venice's overtourism problem has received widespread media coverage. The causes of overtourism in Venice are numerous but the main factors include the volume of cruise ship passengers, excessive day trip visitors – which far outnumber residents and overnight guests – and an increase in peer to peer home-sharing platforms which are squeezing local people out of the housing market.

In 2023, less than 50,000 residents lived in Venice's Centro Storico. In the 1970s it is reported the old city centre housed 175,000 residents. On busy days, day trippers can number up to 85,000 per day.

A total of 30% of available residential apartments are occupied by tourist rentals.

Since 2021, large cruise ships have been banned from entering the historic centre after UNESCO threatened to put Venice on its endangered list as a result of damage to the lagoon. In 2024, Venice authorities introduced an entry fee for day trippers on peak days between April and June to deter visitors; however, in late 2024 it was reported that this was not successful in reducing numbers.

== Land and climate ==
=== Geography ===
Topographic map of Italy

Italy is located in southern Europe and it is also considered a part of western Europe, between latitudes 35° and 47° N, and longitudes 6° and 19° E. To the north, Italy borders Switzerland, France, Austria and Slovenia and is roughly delimited by the Alpine watershed, enclosing the Po Valley and the Venetian Plain. To the south, it consists of the entirety of the Italian Peninsula crossed by the Apennines and the two Mediterranean islands of Sicily and Sardinia, in addition to many smaller islands. The sovereign states of San Marino and the Vatican City are enclaves within Italy, while Campione d'Italia is an Italian exclave in Switzerland.

Italy is part of the Northern Hemisphere. The country's total area is 301,230 square kilometres (116,306 sq mi), of which 294,020 km^{2} (113,522 sq mi) is land and 7,210 km^{2} (2,784 sq mi) is water. Including islands, Italy has a coastline of 7,900 km (4,900 mi) on the Adriatic Sea, Ionian Sea, Tyrrhenian Sea, Ligurian Sea, Sea of Sardinia and Strait of Sicily, and borders shared with France (488 km (303 mi)), Austria (430 km (267 mi)), Slovenia (232 km (144 mi)) and Switzerland (740 km (460 mi)). San Marino (39 km (24 mi)) and Vatican City (3.2 km (2.0 mi)), both enclaves, account for the remainder.

=== Climate ===
Map of the climate of Italy

The climate of Italy is influenced by the large body of water of the Mediterranean Sea that surrounds Italy on every side except the north. These seas constitute a reservoir of heat and humidity for Italy. Within the southern temperate zone, they determine a particular climate called Mediterranean climate with local differences due to the geomorphology of the territory, which tends to make its mitigating effects felt, especially in high pressure conditions.

Because of the length of the peninsula and the mostly mountainous hinterland, the climate of Italy is highly diverse. The inland northern areas of Italy (for example Turin, Milan, and Bologna) have a relatively cool, mid-latitude version of the Humid subtropical climate (Köppen climate classification Cfa), while the coastal areas of Liguria and the peninsula south of Florence generally fit the Mediterranean climate profile (Köppen climate classification Csa).

Conditions on the coast are different from those in the interior, particularly during winter months when the higher altitudes tend to be cold, wet, and often snowy. The coastal regions have mild winters and warm and generally dry summers, although lowland valleys can be quite hot in summer. Between the north and south there can be a considerable difference in temperature, above all during the winter: on some winter days it can be −2 °C (28 °F) and snowing in Milan, while it is 8 °C (46.4 °F) in Rome and 20 °C (68 °F) in Palermo. Temperature differences are less extreme in the summer.

== Transport ==
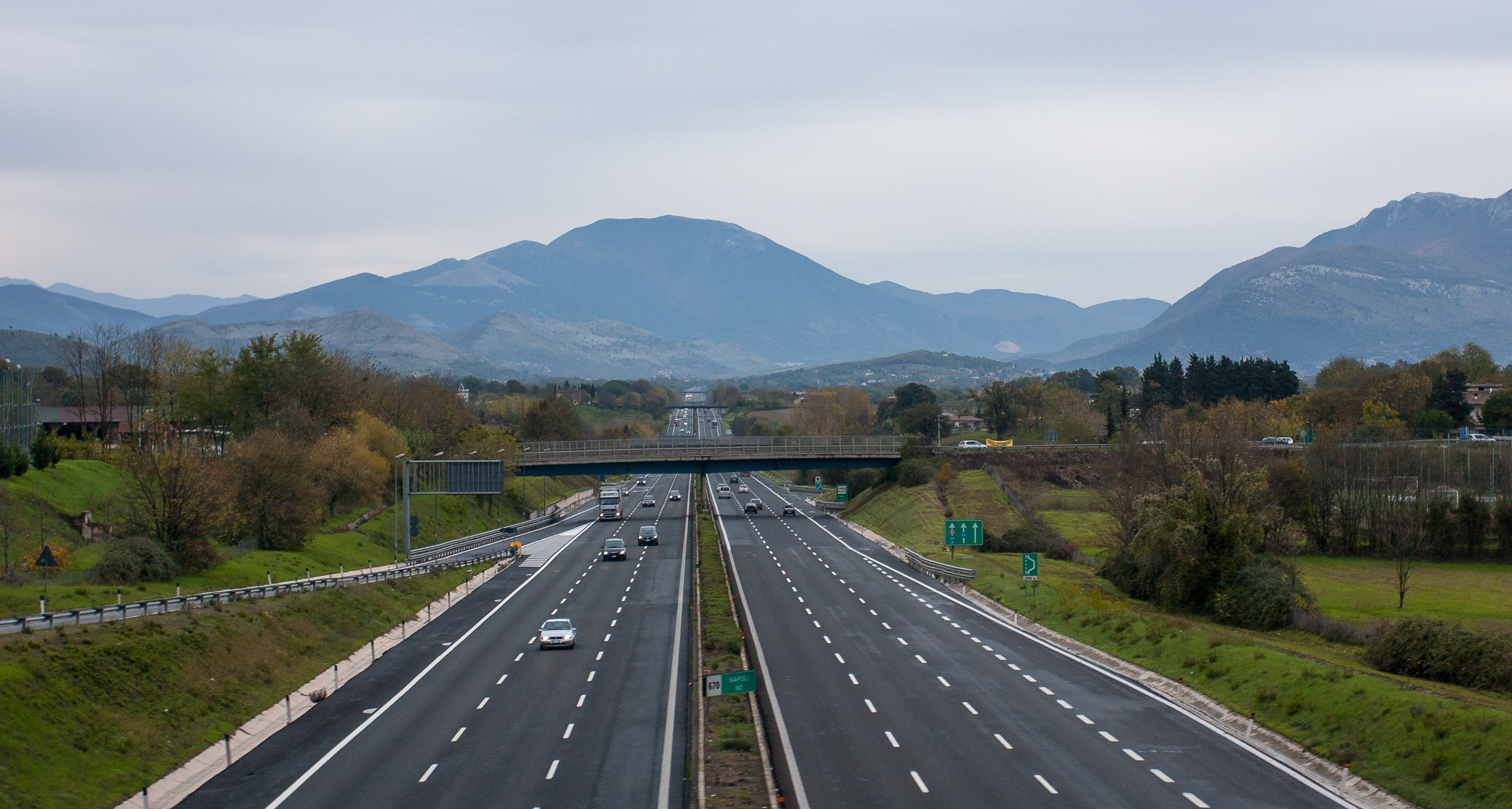
Autostrada A1 runs through Italy linking some of the largest cities of the country: Milan, Bologna, Florence, Rome and Naples.

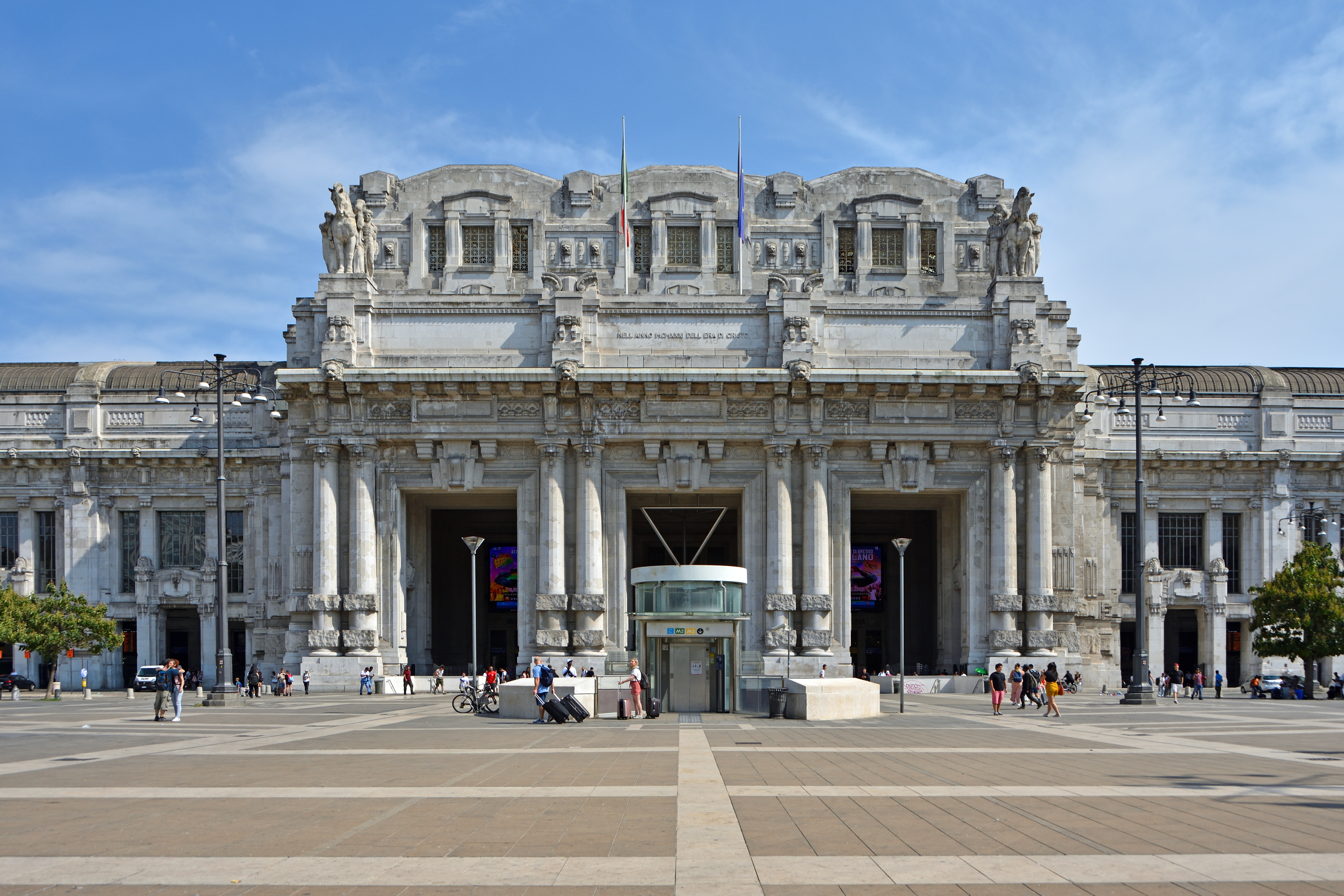
Milano Centrale railway station in Milan is the largest railway station in Europe by volume.

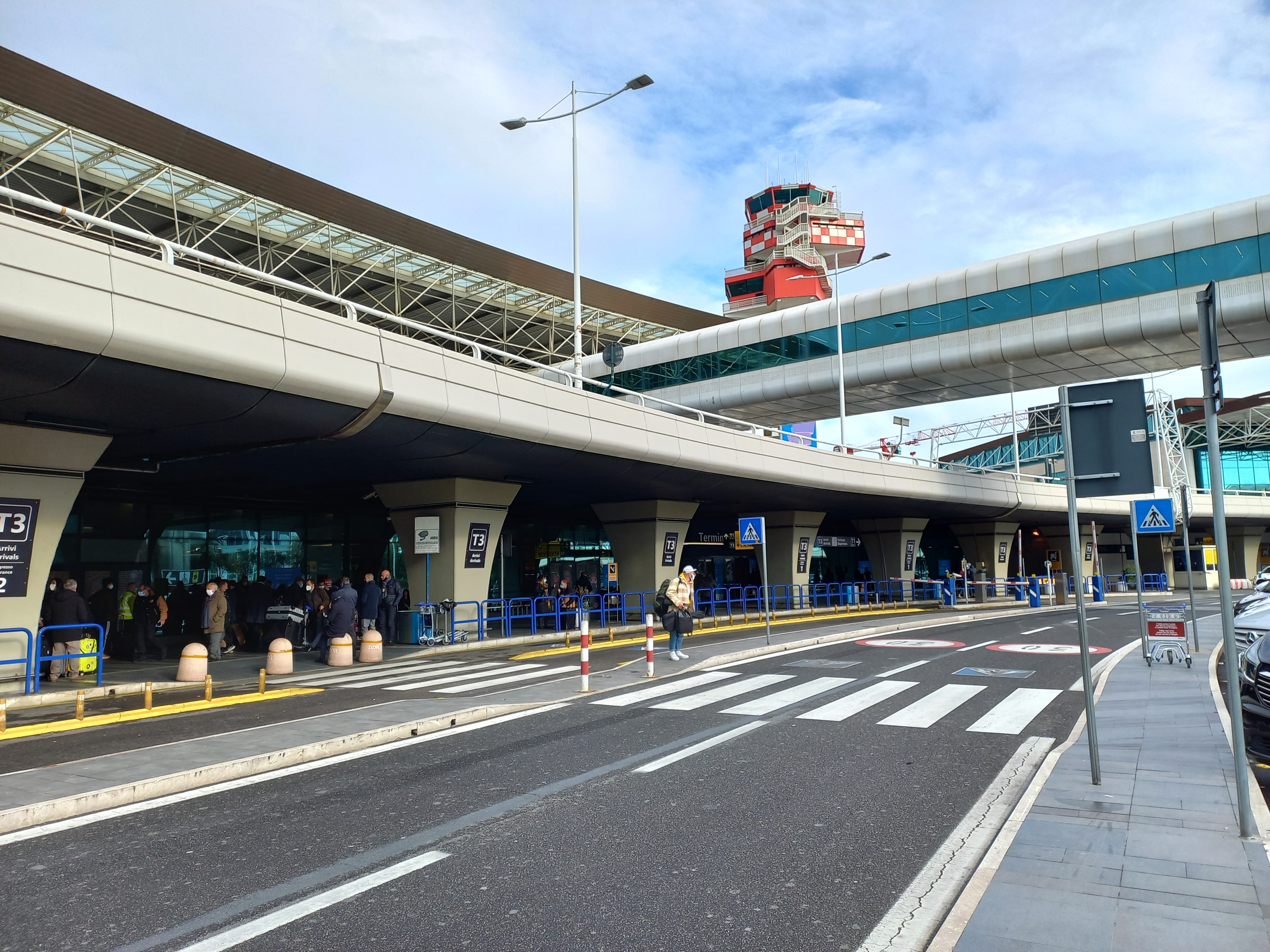
Leonardo Da Vinci International Airport in Rome

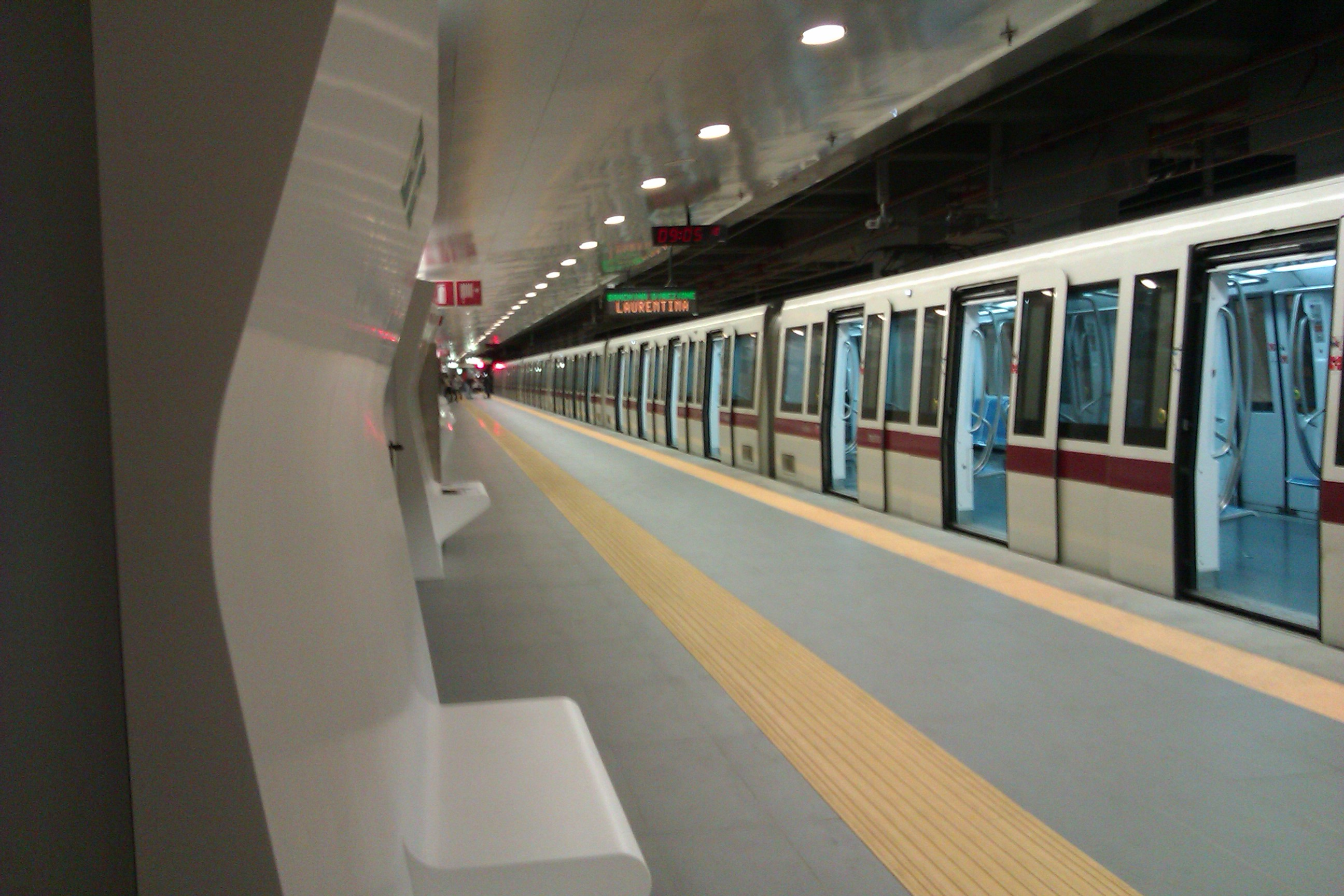
Rome Metro

Transport infrastructure in Italy is well developed. Italy's paved road network is widespread, with a total length of about 487,700 km (303,000 mi). It comprises both an extensive motorway network (7,016 km (4,360 mi)), called autostrade, mostly toll roads, and national and local roads. The Strade Statali is the Italian national network of state highways. The total length for this network is about 25,000 km (16,000 mi). Strade Regionali ("regional roads") are a type of Italian road maintained by the regions they traverse. A regional road is less important than a state highway, but more important than a Strada Provinciale ("provincial road"). A provincial road is more important than a Strada Comunale ("municipal road").

The national railway network is also extensive, especially in the north, totalizing 16,862 km of which 69% are electrified and on which 4,937 locomotives and railcars circulate. It is the 12th largest in the world, and is operated by state-owned Ferrovie dello Stato, while the rail tracks and infrastructure are managed by Rete Ferroviaria Italiana. While a number of private railroads exist and provide mostly commuter-type services, the national railway also provides sophisticated high-speed rail service that joins the major cities.

Italy's metro systems offer efficient urban transport in cities like Milan and Rome. Milan’s Metro, with five lines, connects major areas, while Rome's three-line Metro facilitates access to landmarks like the Colosseum and Vatican. These metro systems are integral to Italy's public transport network, providing a quick and convenient way to navigate the cities.

Italy is the fifth in Europe by number of passengers by air transport, with about 148 million passengers or about 10% of the European total in 2011. There are approximately 130 airports in Italy, of which 99 have paved runways (including the two hubs of Leonardo Da Vinci International in Rome and Malpensa International in Milan).

In 2004 there were 43 major seaports including the Port of Genoa, the country's largest and the third busiest by cargo tonnage in the Mediterranean Sea. Due to the increasing importance of the maritime Silk Road with its connections to Asia and East Africa, the Italian ports for Central and Eastern Europe have become important in recent years. In particular, the deep water port of Trieste in the northernmost part of the Mediterranean Sea is the target of Italian, Asian and European investments. The national inland waterway network comprises 1,477 km (918 mi) of navigable rivers and channels. In the northern regions of Lombardy and Veneto, commuter ferry boats operate on Lake Garda and Lake Como to connect towns and villages at both sides of the lakes.

Seven Italian cities have metro systems:

City	Name	Lines	Length	Stations	Opening
Brescia	Brescia Metro	1	13.7 km (8.5 mi)	17	2013
Catania	Catania Metro	1	10.5 km (6.5 mi)	12	1999
Genoa	Genoa Metro	1	7.1 km (4.4 mi)	8	1990
Milan	Milan Metro	5	111.8 km (69.5 mi)	125	1964
Naples	Naples Metro	3	36.4 km (22.6 mi)	31	1993
Rome	Rome Metro	3	62 km (39 mi)	74	1955
Turin	Turin Metro	1	15.1 km (9.4 mi)	23	2006

== Tourist flows ==
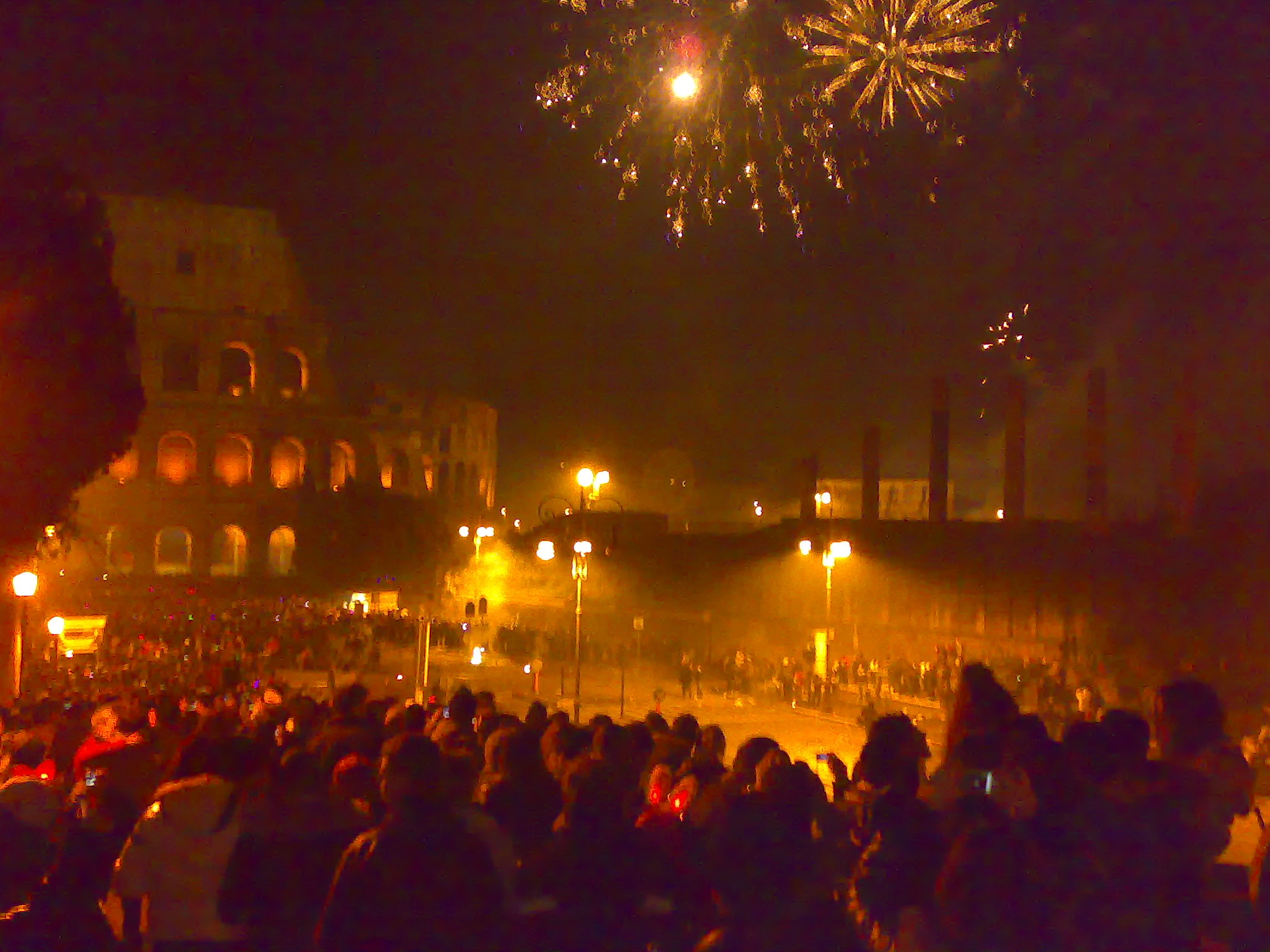
New Year's Day fireworks display in Rome on 1 January 2012

The peaks of tourist flows in Italy are recorded in winter, due to the Christmas and New Year's Day holidays, in spring, due to the Easter holidays, and in summer, due to the favourable climate.

For internal tourism, peaks of tourist flows are also recorded on the occasion of the three national civil holidays, the Festa della liberazione (25 April), the Festa dei lavoratori (1 May) and the Festa della Repubblica (2 June), as well as for three religious holidays, the Ferragosto (15 August), the Ognissanti (1 November) and the Festa dell'Immacolata Concezione (8 December).

== Statistics ==
=== Arrivals by country ===
Most visitors arriving in Italy in 2023 were citizens of the following countries:

#	Country	Arrivals
1	Germany	13.534.624
2	United States	7.553.297
3	France	5.070.455
4	United Kingdom	3.588.655
5	Switzerland	3.432.264
6	Austria	2.954.193
7	Netherlands	2.377.835
8	Spain	2.349.955
9	Poland	2.115.376
10	Other European countries	1.502.321
11	Belgium	1.327.329
12	Australia	1.326.986
13	Other Asian countries	1.276.831
14	Canada	1.152.652
15	China	1.141.851
16	Brazil	1.119.696
17	Czech Republic	1.095.067
18	Romania	1.059.288
19	Other Latin America countries	841.639
20	South Korea	799.939
21	Hungary	702.037
22	Denmark	700.794
23	Israel	697.781
24	Other Middle East countries	697.730
25	Sweden	674.568
26	Mexico	657.081
27	Ireland	617.775
28	Argentina	573.034
29	Turkey	534.378
	Total arrivals	127.234.085

=== Overnight stays by country ===
In 2024, the main countries of origin according to Istat were:

Rank	Country	Overnight stays
1	Germany	65,270,290
2	United States	23,744,949
3	United Kingdom	14,802,365
4	France	14,042,660
5	Switzerland	12,065,417
6	Netherlands	11,209,689
7	Austria	10,486,816
8	Poland	9,401,226
9	Spain	6,945,570
10	Belgium	5,109,663
11	Czech Republic	4,942,988
12	China	4,106,271
13	Romania	4,075,029
14	Australia	3,981,131
15	Brazil	3,937,301
16	Canada	3,827,038
17	Denmark	3,275,395
18	Hungary	2,783,573
19	Sweden	2,495,653
20	Ireland	2,414,418
21	South Korea	2,194,862
22	Ukraine	2,071,210
23	Mexico	1,926,705
24	Turkey	1,854,158
25	Argentina	1,742,943
26	India	1,726,962
27	Japan	1,563,386
28	Russia	1,524,377
29	Israel	1,502,310
30	Portugal	1,482,119
	Other countries	-
	Total overnight stays	253,948,443

=== Regional data on tourist overnight stays ===
ISTAT data as of 2024

#	Region	Non-residents	Residents	Total overnight stays
1	Veneto	51,778,487	21,693,890	73,472,377
2	Trentino-Alto Adige/Südtirol	35,171,938	21,519,493	56,691,431
3	Tuscany	26,621,227	19,599,594	46,220,821
4	Lazio	34,789,092	16,964,475	51,753,567
5	Lombardy	29,249,711	15,880,818	45,130,529
6	Emilia-Romagna	12,215,627	28,567,193	40,782,820
7	Campania	11,642,359	9,727,103	21,369,462
8	Apulia	6,031,556	11,862,805	17,894,361
9	Sicily	8,650,869	8,697,369	17,348,238
10	Liguria	7,394,277	8,734,589	16,128,866
11	Piedmont	7,362,027	7,033,710	14,395,737
12	Sardinia	7,976,663	7,633,588	15,610,251
13	Marche	1,909,193	8,572,481	10,481,674
14	Friuli Venezia Giulia	6,012,483	4,131,497	10,143,980
15	Calabria	1,606,108	6,537,862	8,143,970
16	Abruzzo	1,084,087	6,092,117	7,176,204
17	Umbria	2,384,282	4,366,760	6,751,042
18	Aosta Valley	1,531,697	2,163,362	3,695,059
19	Basilicata	447,925	2,063,447	2,511,372
20	Molise	42,335	413,949	456,284
	Italy	253,948,443	212,209,602	466,158,045

=== Italian cities by number of visitors ===
ISTAT data for 2024

Rank	Municipality	Region	Province/Metropolitan City	Overnight stays
1	Rome	Lazio	Metropolitan City of Rome Capital	42,705,319
2	Milan	Lombardy	Metropolitan City of Milan	14,054,184
3	Venice	Veneto	Metropolitan City of Venice	13,290,973
4	Florence	Tuscany	Metropolitan City of Florence	9,192,960
5	Rimini	Emilia-Romagna	Province of Rimini	6,938,992
6	Cavallino-Treporti	Veneto	Metropolitan City of Venice	6,761,224
7	San Michele al Tagliamento	Veneto	Metropolitan City of Venice	5,572,705
8	Jesolo	Veneto	Metropolitan City of Venice	5,496,611
9	Caorle	Veneto	Metropolitan City of Venice	4,426,817
10	Bologna	Emilia-Romagna	Metropolitan City of Bologna	4,146,877
11	Lazise	Veneto	Province of Verona	4,052,124
12	Naples	Campania	Metropolitan City of Naples	3,862,329
13	Lignano Sabbiadoro	Friuli-Venezia Giulia	Province of Udine	3,618,677
14	Cesenatico	Emilia-Romagna	Province of Forlì-Cesena	3,609,439
15	Turin	Piedmont	Metropolitan City of Turin	3,580,221
16	Riccione	Emilia-Romagna	Province of Rimini	3,421,764
17	Cervia	Emilia-Romagna	Province of Ravenna	3,408,137
18	Verona	Veneto	Province of Verona	3,103,472
19	Sorrento	Campania	Metropolitan City of Naples	2,847,463
20	Ravenna	Emilia-Romagna	Province of Ravenna	2,842,778
21	Peschiera del Garda	Veneto	Province of Verona	2,582,448
22	Bardolino	Veneto	Province of Verona	2,487,568
23	Genoa	Liguria	Metropolitan City of Genoa	2,297,499
24	Fiumicino	Lazio	Metropolitan City of Rome Capital	2,166,080
25	Comacchio	Emilia-Romagna	Province of Ferrara	2,161,905
26	Bellaria-Igea Marina	Emilia-Romagna	Province of Rimini	2,135,560
27	Vieste	Apulia	Province of Foggia	2,042,567
28	Palermo	Sicily	Metropolitan City of Palermo	1,964,765
29	Pisa	Tuscany	Province of Pisa	1,861,048
30	Abano Terme	Veneto	Province of Padua	1,860,546
31	Castelrotto	Trentino-Alto Adige/Südtirol	South Tyrol	1,780,424
32	Padua	Veneto	Province of Padua	1,764,999
33	Riva del Garda	Trentino-Alto Adige/Südtirol	Trentino	1,720,333
34	Livigno	Lombardy	Province of Sondrio	1,664,753
35	Chioggia	Veneto	Metropolitan City of Venice	1,651,277
36	Montecatini Terme	Tuscany	Province of Pistoia	1,562,492
37	Cattolica	Emilia-Romagna	Province of Rimini	1,543,275
38	Castiglione della Pescaia	Tuscany	Province of Grosseto	1,452,965
39	Selva di Val Gardena	Trentino-Alto Adige/Südtirol	South Tyrol	1,435,639
40	Assisi	Umbria	Province of Perugia	1,402,071
41	Grado	Friuli-Venezia Giulia	Province of Gorizia	1,401,767
42	Trieste	Friuli-Venezia Giulia	Province of Trieste	1,391,122
43	Bari	Apulia	Metropolitan City of Bari	1,372,257
44	Alghero	Sardinia	Province of Sassari	1,314,529
45	Badia	Trentino-Alto Adige/Südtirol	South Tyrol	1,303,575
46	Sirmione	Lombardy	Province of Brescia	1,273,116
47	Forio	Campania	Metropolitan City of Naples	1,262,123
48	Limone sul Garda	Lombardy	Province of Brescia	1,216,414
49	Merano	Trentino-Alto Adige/Südtirol	South Tyrol	1,215,574
50	Malcesine	Veneto	Province of Verona	1,191,972
			Other municipalities	268,744,316
			Total overnight stays	466,158,045

=== Italian archaeological sites and museums by number of visitors ===
Below is a table with the most visited archaeological sites and museums in Italy (data as of 2024)

Rank	Attraction	Visitors
1	Colosseum	14.733.395
2	St. Peter's Basilica	11.000.000
3	Vatican Museums	6.825.436
4	Sistine Chapel	6.000.000
5	St. Mark's Square	6.000.000
6	Sanctuary of Saint Pio of Pietrelcina	5.600.000
7	Uffizi	5.294.968
8	Amalfi Coast	5.000.000
9	Dolomites	5.000.000
10	Florence Cathedral	4.500.000
11	Pompeii	4.267.233
12	Pantheon	4.086.947
13	Holy House of Loreto	4.000.000
14	Cinque Terre	4.000.000
15	Lake Garda	4.000.000
16	Gardaland	3.000.000
17	Duomo di Milano	3.300.000
18	Leaning Tower of Pisa	3.000.000
19	Capri	3.000.000
20	Basilica of Saint Anthony of Padua	3.000.000
21	St Mark's Basilica	2.500.000
22	Galleria dell'Accademia	2.189.103
23	Lake Como	2.000.000
24	Ischia	2.000.000
25	Arena of Verona	1.500.000
26	Castel Sant'Angelo	1.315.063
27	Aquarium of Genoa	1.200.000
28	Mirabilandia	1.200.000
29	Museo Egizio	1.036.689
30	Siena Cathedral	1.000.000
31	Basilica of San Francesco d'Assisi	1.000.000
32	Mount Etna	1.000.000
33	Portofino	1.000.000
34	Val d'Orcia	1.000.000
35	Santa Croce	1.000.000
36	Royal Palace of Caserta	902.410
37	Naples Cathedral	900.000
38	Valley of the Temples	800.000
39	Palermo Cathedral	800.000
40	Monreale Cathedral	800.000
41	Hadrian's Villa	729.907
42	Bargello	720.470
43	Victor Emmanuel II Monument	700.000
44	Certosa di Pavia	700.000
45	Vesuvius	700.000
46	Ferrari Museum	600.000
47	Galleria Borghese	600.000
48	National Archaeological Museum of Naples	600.000
49	Venaria Reale	600.000
50	Herculaneum	550.000
51	Brera Art Gallery	500.000
52	The Last Supper	500.000
53	Cinecittà World	500.000
54	Italia in Miniatura	500.000
55	Pitti Palace	500.000
56	Boboli Gardens	500.000
57	Baths of Caracalla	500.000
58	Palazzo Vecchio	500.000
59	Procida	500.000
60	Paestum	450.000
61	Zoom Torino	450.000
62	Ostia Antica	430.000
63	Doge's Palace	400.000
64	Oltremare	400.000
65	Castel Sant'Elmo	400.000
66	Parma Cathedral	400.000
67	Fiabilandia	350.000
68	Gallerie dell'Accademia	350.000
69	Modena Cathedral	350.000
70	Parco Natura Viva	300.000
71	Castello di Montebello	300.000
72	Ancient theatre of Taormina	300.000
73	Royal Palace of Naples	300.000
74	National Roman Museum	300.000
75	National Archaeological Museum of Venice	300.000
76	Ducal Palace (Mantua)	300.000
77	Roman theatre, Verona	300.000
78	Capodimonte Museum	250.000
79	Castello Scaligero (Sirmione)	250.000
80	National Gallery of the Marche	200.000
81	National Etruscan Museum	200.000
82	Velia	200.000
83	Miramare Castle	200.000
84	Abbey of Montecassino	200.000
85	Orvieto Cathedral	200.000
86	Museo Nazionale della Magna Grecia	200.000
87	National Museum of Matera	200.000
88	Este Castle	200.000
89	Ducal Palace of Urbino	200.000
90	Segesta	200.000
91	Nora Archaeological Park	200.000
92	National Archaeological Museum of Taranto	200.000
93	Sibari	200.000
94	National Museum of Ravenna	200.000
95	National Gallery of Parma	200.000
96	Selinunte	200.000
97	National Archaeological Museum, Cagliari	200.000
98	Norman‑Swabian Castle (Bari)	200.000
99	Villa d’Este	200.000
100	Museum of the Twentieth Century	200.000

== Factors of tourist interest ==
There are many factors that drive tourism interest to Italy.

=== Artistic-cultural tourism ===
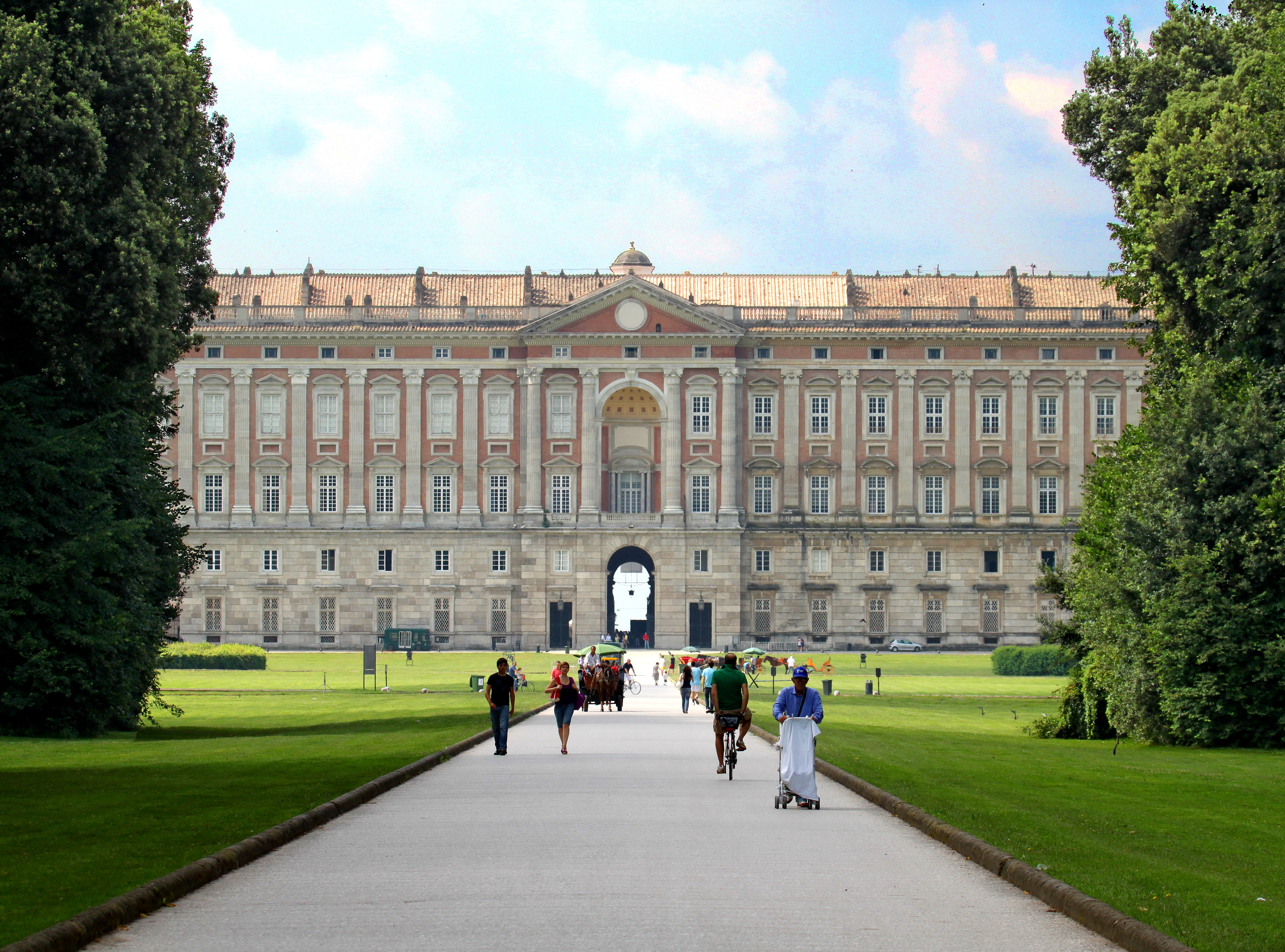
Royal Palace of Caserta is the largest former royal residence in the world.

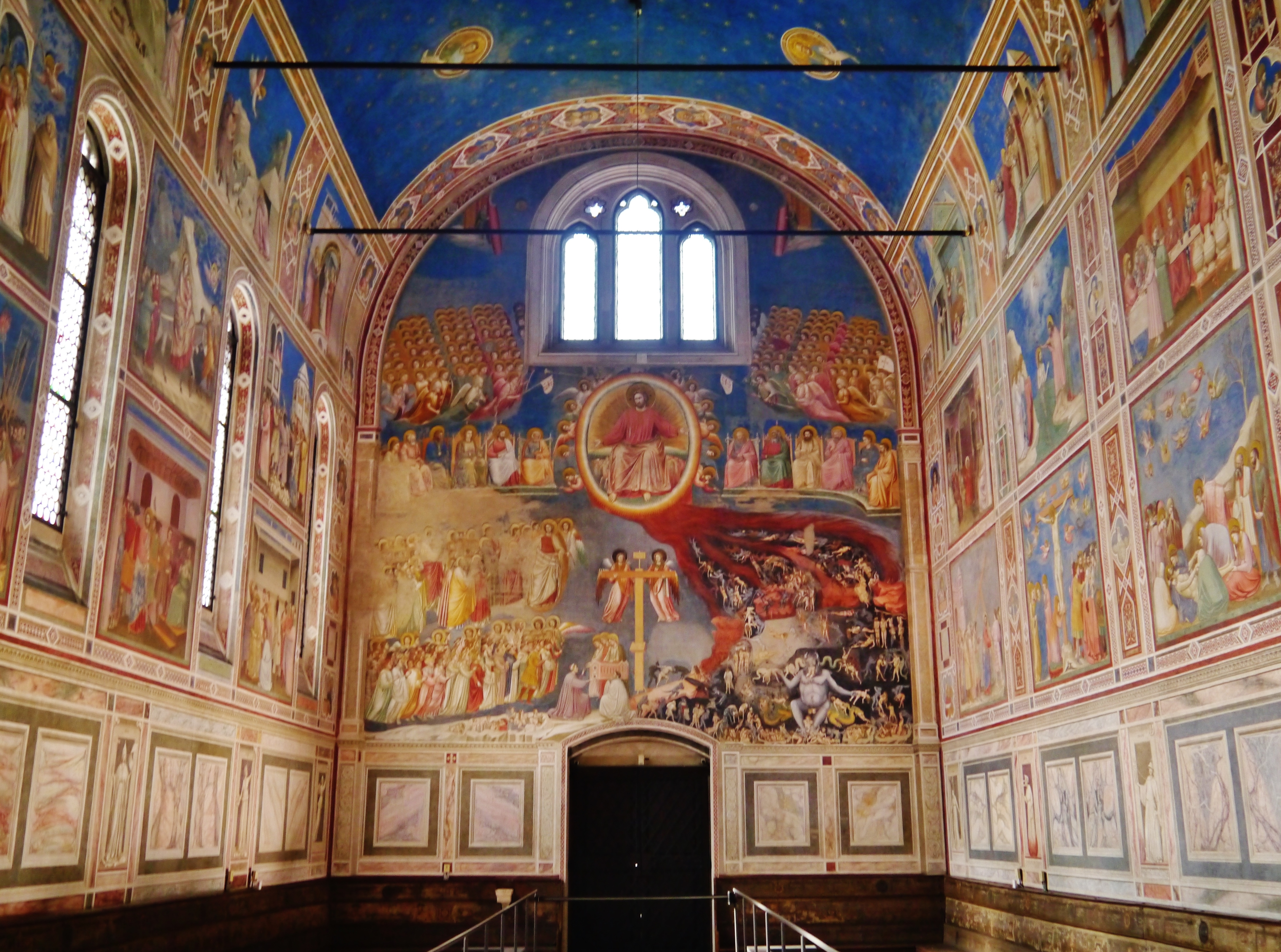
Scrovegni Chapel in Padua contains a fresco cycle by Giotto, an important masterpiece of Western art.

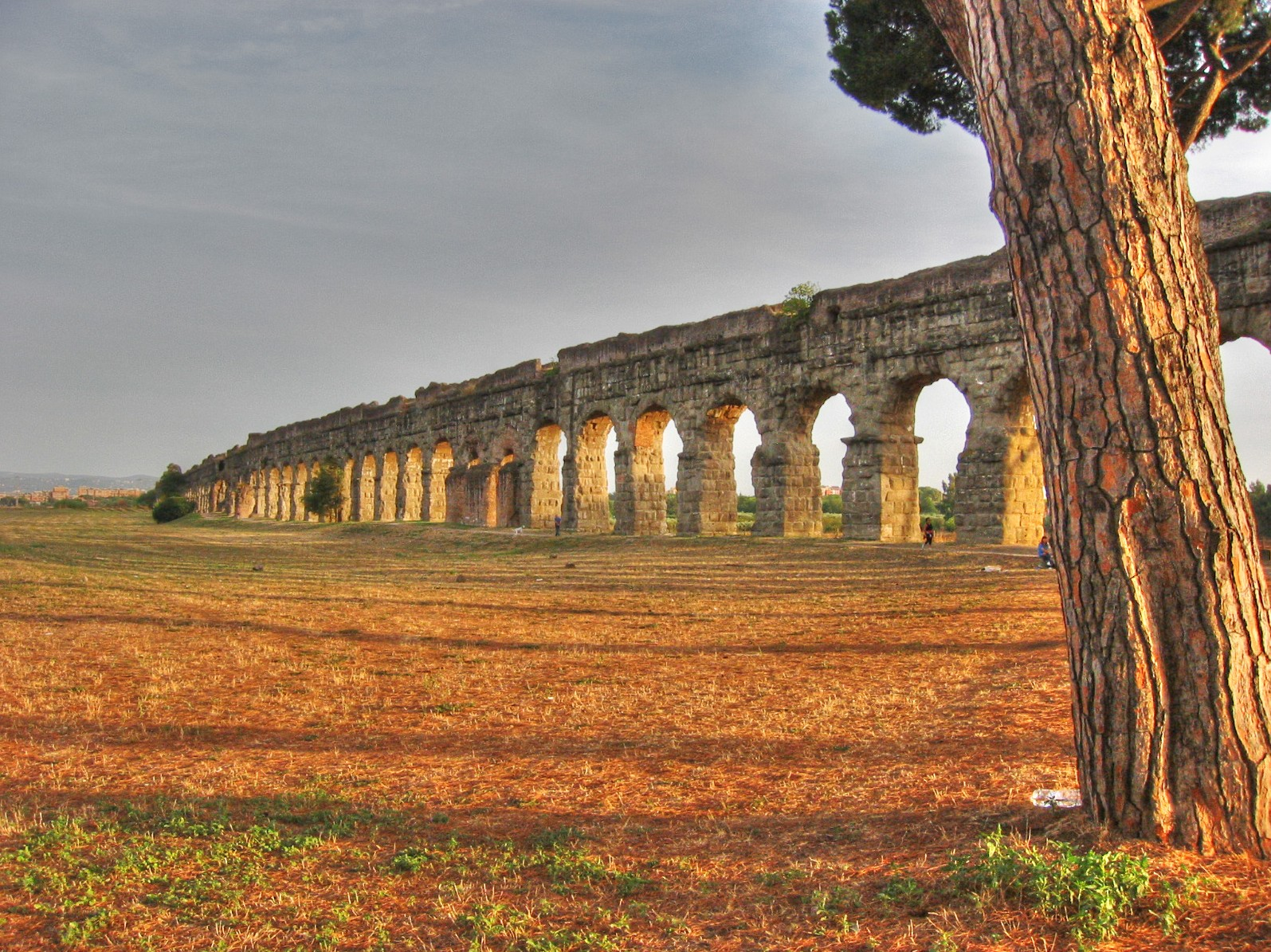
View of the Parco degli Acquedotti, part of the Appian Way Regional Park in Rome, where there is a large concentration of Roman aqueducts

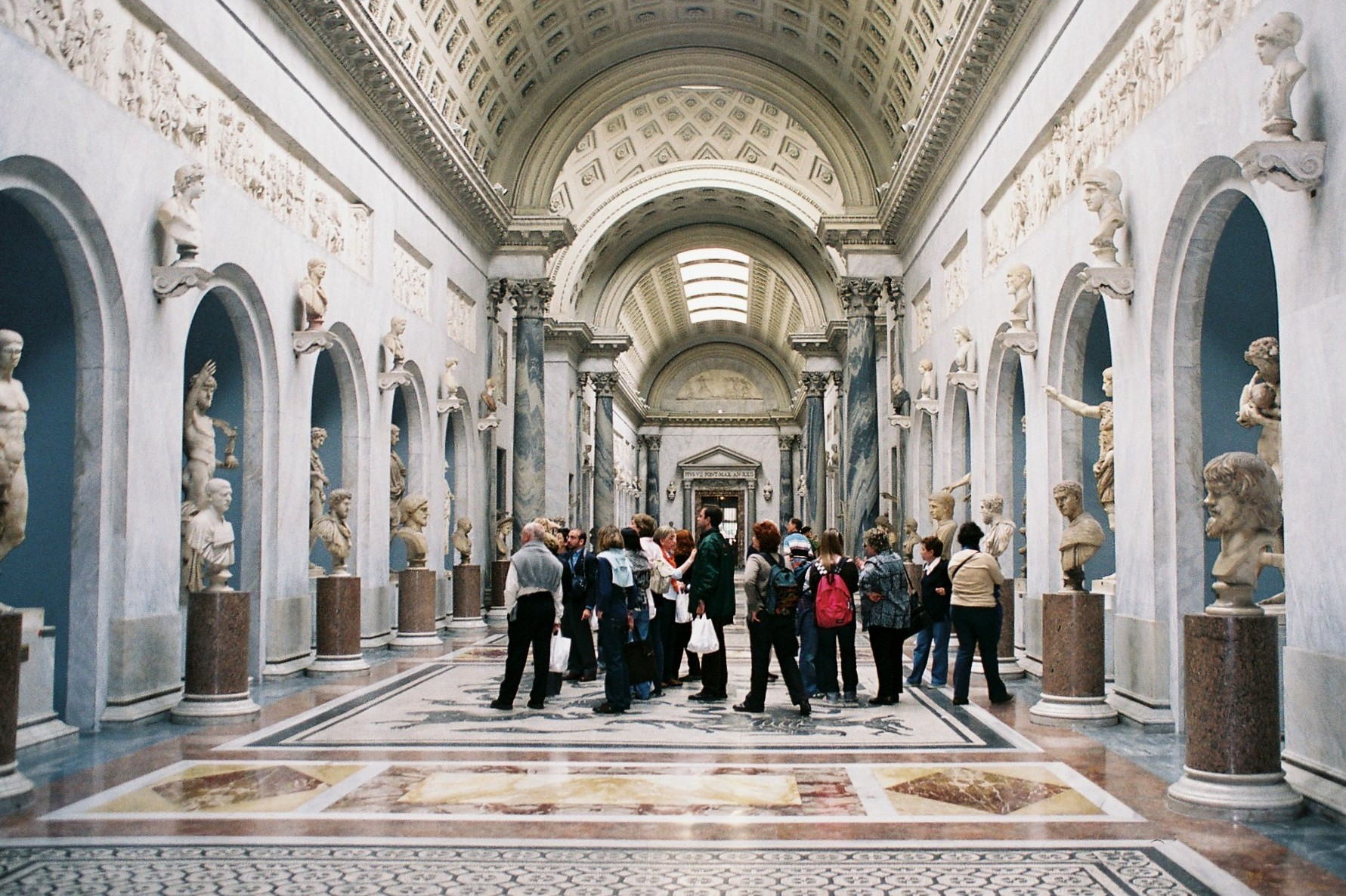
Vatican Museums in Rome, ranked second in the list of most-visited art museums in the world after the Louvre, and third on the list of most-visited museums

Italy is considered one of the birthplaces of western civilization and a cultural superpower. Divided by politics and geography for centuries until its eventual unification in 1861, Italy's culture has been shaped by a multitude of regional customs and local centres of power and patronage. Italy has had a central role in Western culture for centuries and is still recognised for its cultural traditions and artists. During the Middle Ages and the Renaissance, a number of courts competed to attract architects, artists and scholars, thus producing a legacy of monuments, paintings, music and literature. Despite the political and social isolation of these courts, Italy has made a substantial contribution to the cultural and historical heritage of Europe. The country has had a broad cultural influence worldwide, also because numerous Italians emigrated to other places during the Italian diaspora.

The country boasts several world-famous cities. Rome was the ancient capital of the Roman Empire, the seat of the Pope of the Catholic Church, the capital of reunified Italy and the artistic, cultural and cinematographic centre of world relevance. Florence was the heart of the Renaissance, a period of great achievements in the arts at the end of the Middle Ages. Other important cities include Turin, which used to be the capital of Italy and is now one of the world's great centres of automobile engineering. Milan is the industrial and financial capital of Italy and one of the world's fashion capitals. Venice, the former capital of a major financial and maritime power from the Middle Ages to the early modern period, with its intricate canal system attracts tourists from all over the world, especially during the Venetian Carnival and the Biennale. Naples, with the largest historic city centre in Europe and the oldest continuously active public opera house in the world (Teatro di San Carlo). Bologna is the main transport hub of the country, as well as the home of the oldest university in the world and of a worldwide famous cuisine.

Italian art has influenced several major movements throughout the centuries and has produced several great artists, including painters, architects and sculptors. Italy has a vast and important historical heritage, both in terms of the number of artefacts, as well as in terms of conservation, and in terms of intrinsic artistic-cultural value. For example, Italy boasts the largest number of sites indicated in the UNESCO World Heritage List.

In 2013, the value of the artistic and cultural heritage alone was estimated at 5.4% of Italian GDP, approximately €75.5 billion, capable of employing approximately 1.4 million workers. According to the Eurostat report of 2019, Italian tourism is first in Europe in terms of the number of jobs generated (4.2 million) and third for the average visitor expenditure and the share of revenues of the national sector compared to the European total (€48 billion, 12% of the total).

There are numerous technology parks in Italy such as the Science and Technology Parks Kilometro Rosso (Bergamo), the AREA Science Park (Trieste), The VEGA-Venice Gateway for Science and Technology (Venezia), the Toscana Life Sciences (Siena), the Technology Park of Lodi Cluster (Lodi), and the Technology Park of Navacchio (Pisa), as well as science museums such as the Museo Nazionale Scienza e Tecnologia Leonardo da Vinci in Milan, the Natural History Museum in Milan, the Città della Scienza in Naples and the Institute and Museum of the History of Science in Florence.

=== Seaside tourism ===
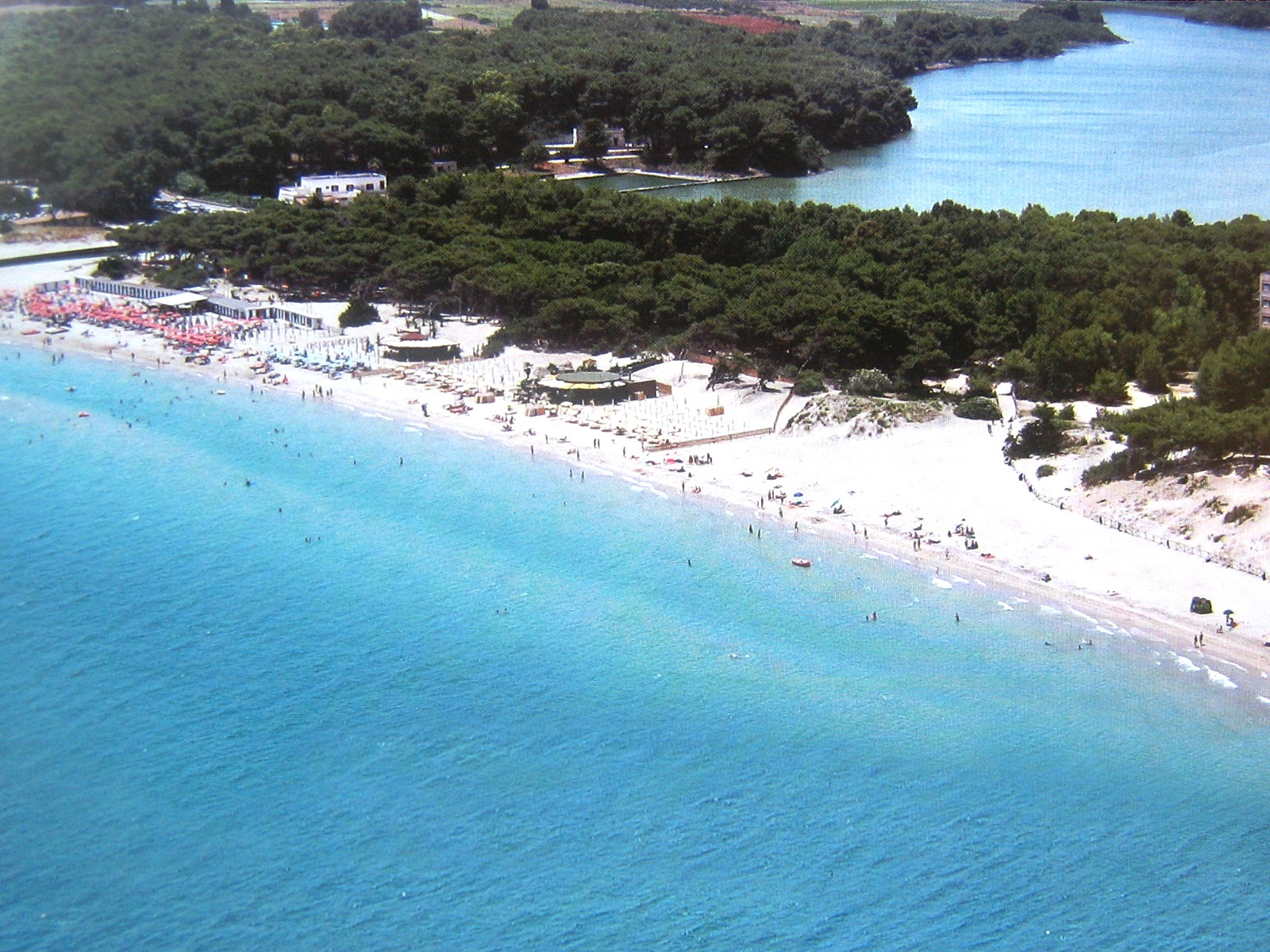
Seaside in Otranto, Apulia

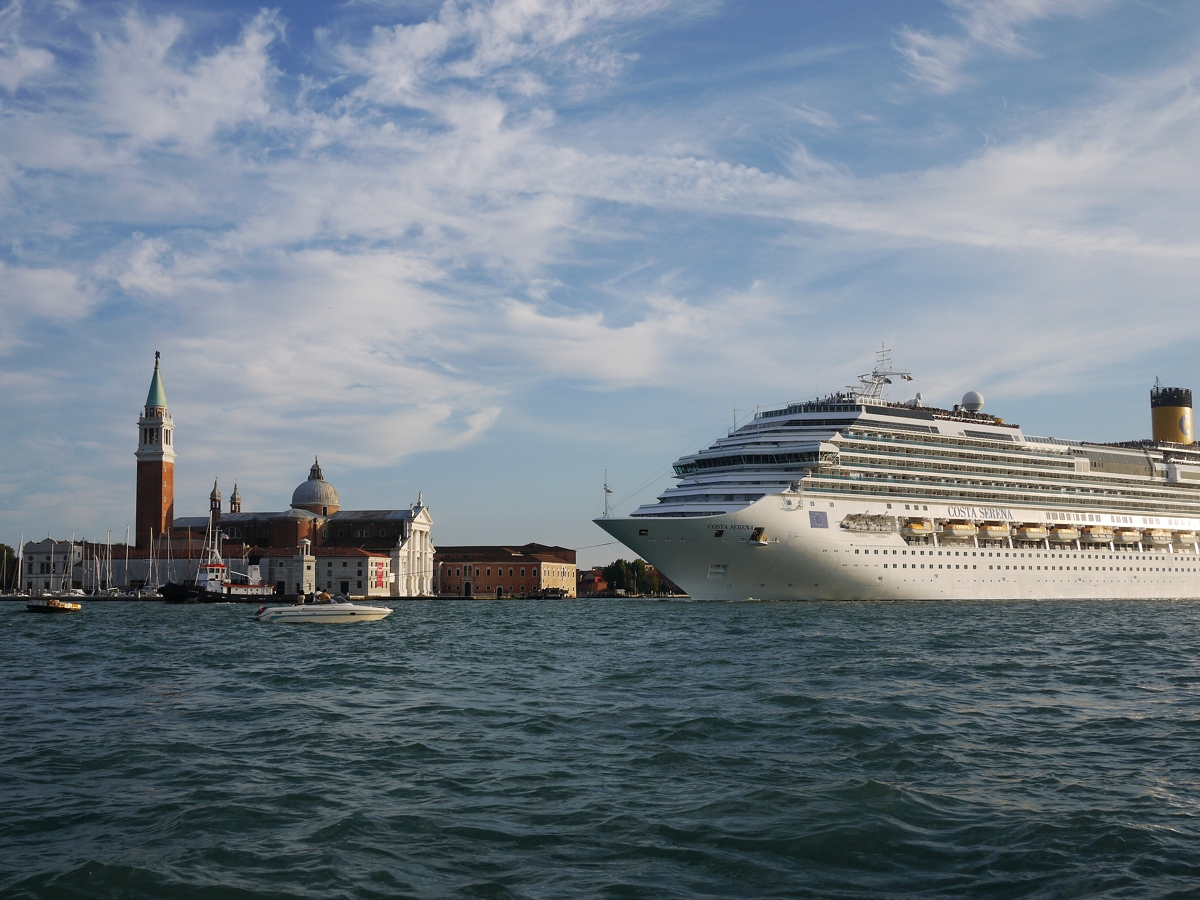
A cruise ship near Venice

Four different seas surround Italy in the Mediterranean Sea from three sides: the Adriatic Sea in the east, the Ionian Sea in the south, and the Ligurian Sea and the Tyrrhenian Sea in the west. Including islands, Italy has a coastline of over 8,000 kilometres (5,000 mi). There are numerous famous coastal stretches.

The Italian Riviera includes nearly all of the coastline of Liguria, extending from the border with France near Ventimiglia eastwards to Capo Corvo, which marks the eastern end of the Gulf of La Spezia. Italian coasts also include the Amalfi Coast, Cilentan Coast, Cinque Terre, Coast of the Gods, Costa Verde, Riviera delle Palme, Riviera del Brenta, Costa Smeralda, Costa Giardino and Trabocchi Coast, in addition to the bays Venetian Lagoon, Augusta Bay, Bay of Naples and Liscia di Vacca.

Notable beaches includes Baia Domizia in Sessa Aurunca and Cellole, Citara in Forio, Cala Fuili in Cala Gonone, Poetto in Cagliari, Spiaggia del Bacan in Venice, Cala Goloritze in Baunei, Baia delle Zagare in Vieste, Cavoli Beach in Elba, La Sorgente Beach in Portoferraio, Cala dei Gabbiani in Baunei, Cala Cipolla beach in Chia, Cauco Beach in Maiori.

Noteworthy seaside locations includes Taormina, Alghero, Positano, Otranto, Tropea, Porto Santo Stefano, Sirolo, Vieste, Sperlonga, Cesenatico, Sestri Levante, Vasto, Termoli, Maratea, Bibione, Muggia, Amalfi, Atrani, Camogli, Capo Rizzuto, Castiglioncello, Cefalù, Gallipoli, Lerici, Manarola, Monterosso al Mare, Pisciotta, Polignano a Mare, Portofino, Praiano, Ravello, Sciacca, Scilla, Sorrento, Vernazza.

Beaches and cliffs are dotted with various accommodation facilities, such as bathing establishments, hotels and restaurants, resorts, agritourism, night and day gathering centres, parks, piers and marinas, as well as numerous historic and artistic centres, which combine an interest in the bathing activities to those for leisure, nature and art.

The Italian seaports are docking points for cruise tourism. Italy is the leading cruise tourism destination in the Mediterranean Sea. Italian seaseaports most frequented by cruise passengers who sail the Mediterranean Sea are Civitavecchia, Genoa, Palermo, Bari, Naples, Savona, Trieste, Monfalcone, Taranto and La Spezia.

=== Lake tourism ===
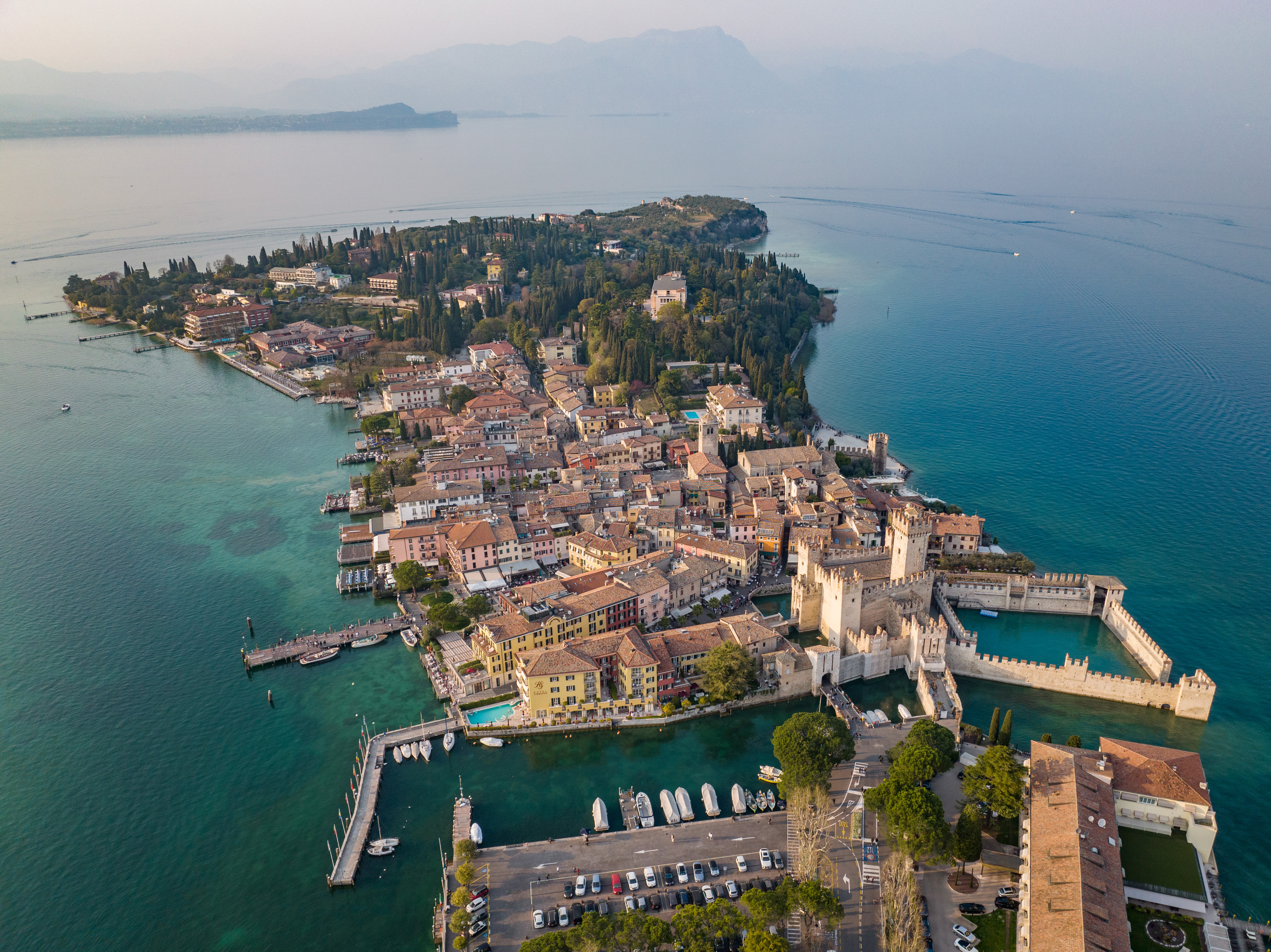
Sirmione, on the shores of Lake Garda

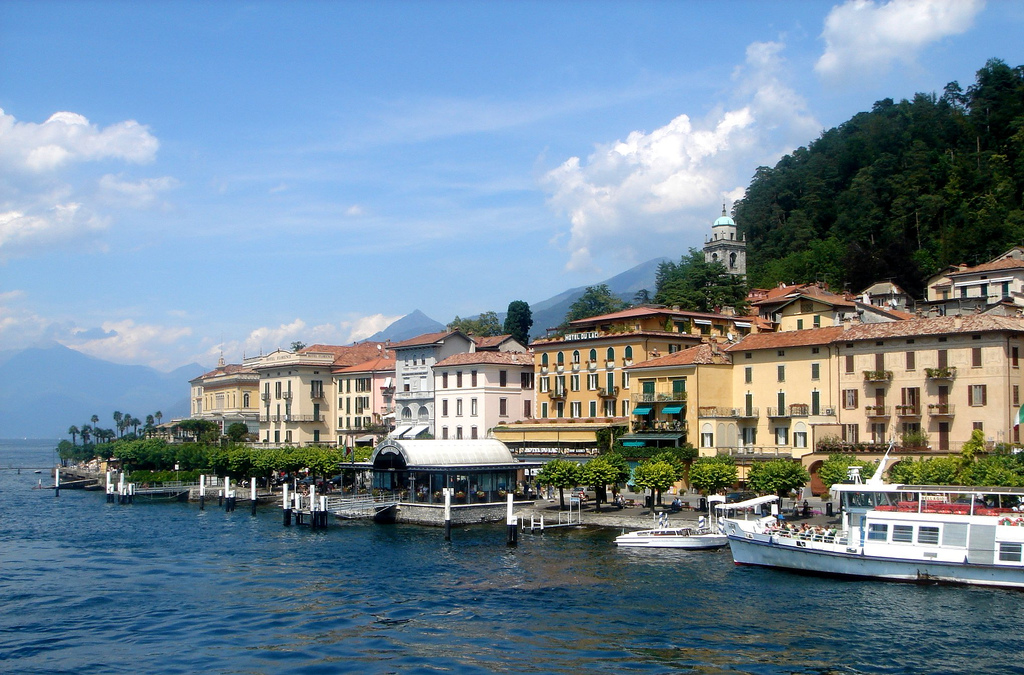
Bellagio, on the shores of Lake Como

There are more than 1000 lakes in Italy, the largest of which is Garda (370 km^{2} or 143 sq mi). Other well-known subalpine lakes are Lake Maggiore (212.5 km^{2} or 82 sq mi), whose most northerly section is part of Switzerland, Como (146 km^{2} or 56 sq mi), one of the deepest lakes in Europe, Orta, Lugano, Iseo, and Idro. Other notable lakes in the Italian peninsula are Trasimeno, Bolsena, Bracciano, Vico, Varano and Lesina in Gargano and Omodeo in Sardinia.

Many Italian lakes are dotted with various accommodation facilities, such as hotels, restaurants and resorts, agritourism, parks, piers and marinas, as well as numerous historic and artistic centres. On the Italian lakes, it is possible to go windsurfing, canoeing and sailing, fishing and scuba diving, while in their surroundings it is possible to go hiking, either on foot or by bicycle. Lakeside noteworthy locations include Mergozzo, Cannero Riviera, Cannobio, Avigliana, Orta San Giulio, Torno, Bellano, Menaggio, Castellaro Lagusello, Tignale, Malcesine, Gardone Riviera, Molveno, Tenno, Ledro, Panicale, Bolsena, Nemi, Trevignano Romano, Civitella Alfedena and Gavoi.

The Italian Lakes are provided with a navigation service by boats. By boat on Lake Maggiore it is possible to visit the Borromean Islands, the Rocca Borromeo di Angera, Laveno Mombello, the Santa Caterina del Sasso and Luino, while on Lake Iseo it is possible to visit Monte Isola. On Lake Como by boat it is possible to go to Como, Lecco, Varenna, Bellagio, Tremezzina, Menaggio and Cernobbio, while on Lake Garda it is possible to visit the Scaligero Castle and the Grottoes of Catullus of Sirmione, and the Vittoriale degli Italiani of Salò. Also on Lake Orta there is a navigation service, thanks to which it is possible to visit the San Giulio Island.

International lake tourism in Italy has been able to establish due to the sounding board created by some celebrities of the international jet set, well known by the general public. The purchase of a holiday residence along Lake Como by actor George Clooney was very publicized in 2001, as well as the marriage of Tom Cruise and Katie Holmes in 2006 in the Castello Orsini-Odescalchi, along Lake Bracciano.

=== Mountain tourism ===
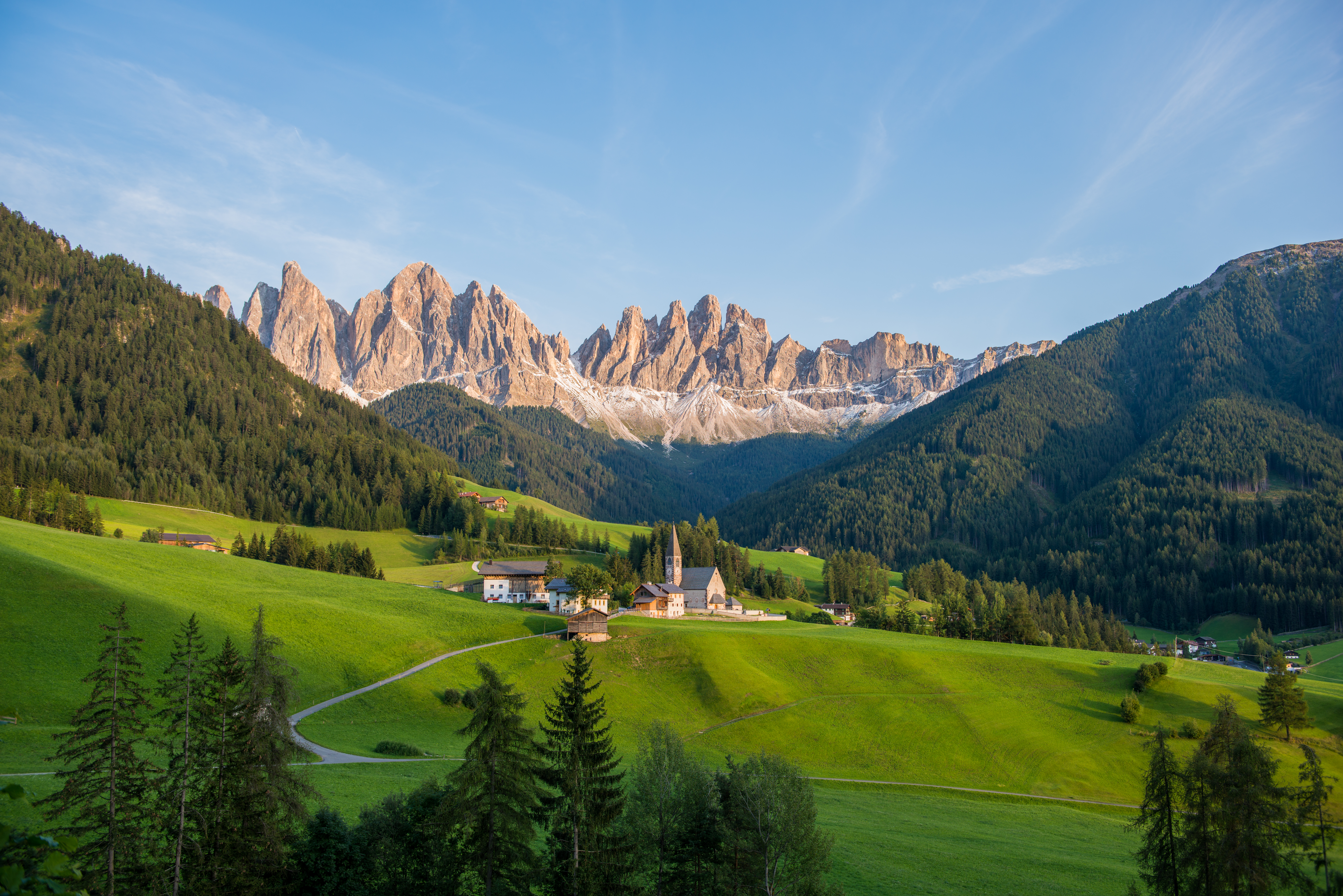
The Dolomite Mountains in summer

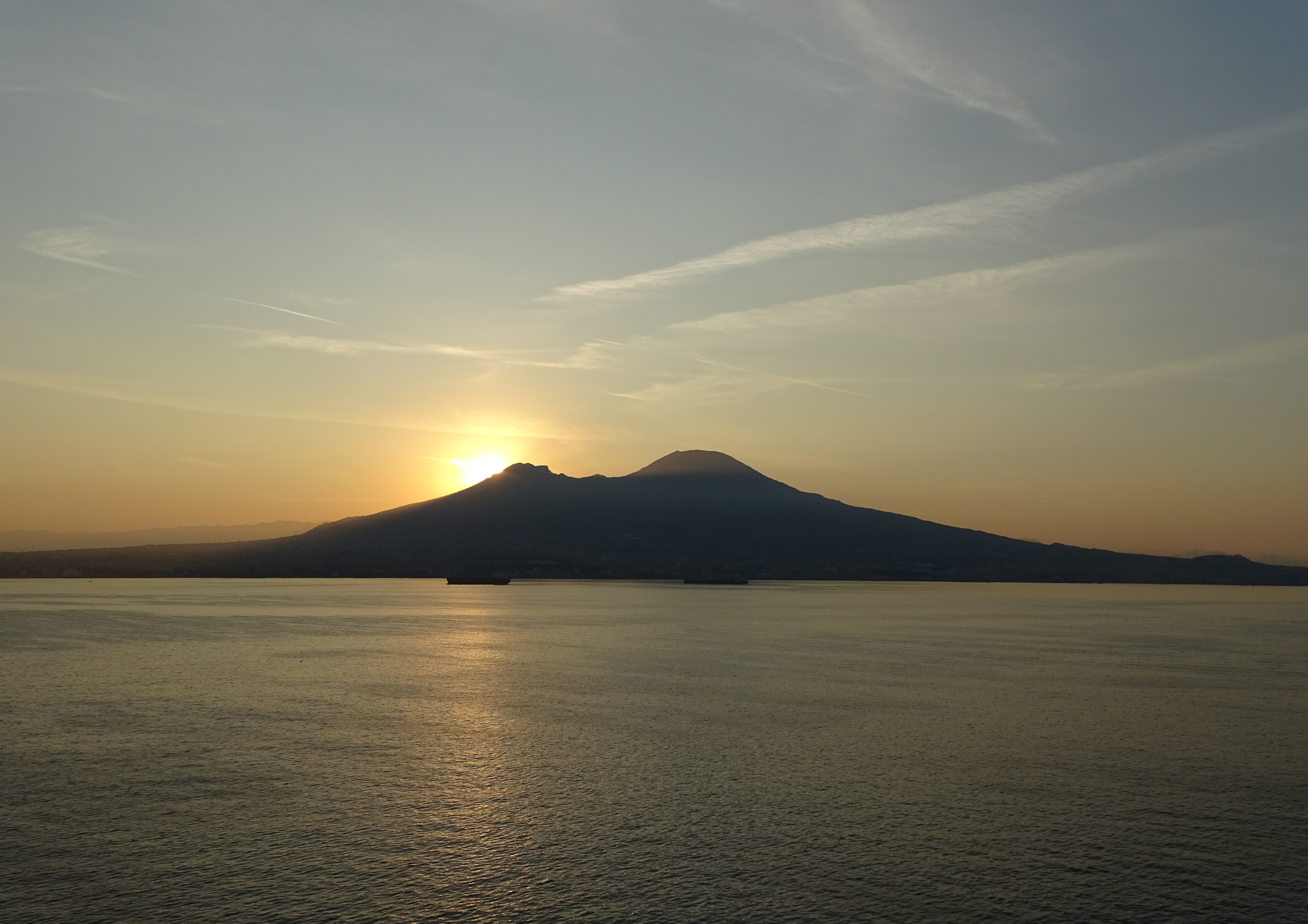
Vesuvius, the only active volcano in Continental Europe

In Italy, there is both winter and summer mountain tourism. Despite a not particularly harsh climate compared to other countries located at more northern latitudes, Italy manages to attract tourists who practice winter sports due to the presence of numerous mountain ranges (the percentage of mountainous territory is around 35%).

Among these are the Alps, the highest mountain range in Europe, and the Apennines, equipped with numerous winter sports and accommodation facilities. In the north the most famous ski resorts are in Sestriere, Livigno, Bormio, Ponte di Legno, in the Dolomites (especially Cortina d'Ampezzo), as well as in the Aosta Valley (especially Breuil-Cervinia), while in the center-south Abruzzo is the mountainous region with major ski resorts in Roccaraso, Ovindoli, Pescasseroli and Campo Felice.

As for mountain summer tourism, noteworthy locations includes Courmayeur, Val di Fassa, Abetone and Ceresole Reale. During the summer, in the Italian mountains, there are itineraries and paths, both on foot and by bicycle, where it is possible to admire naturalistic beauties, historic and artistic centres, glaciers, lakes, as well as practice numerous sports activities such as mountaineering, paragliding, rafting and hang gliding. In the Italian mountains there are a large number of agritourism locations, baite and resorts, as well as hotels and restaurants.

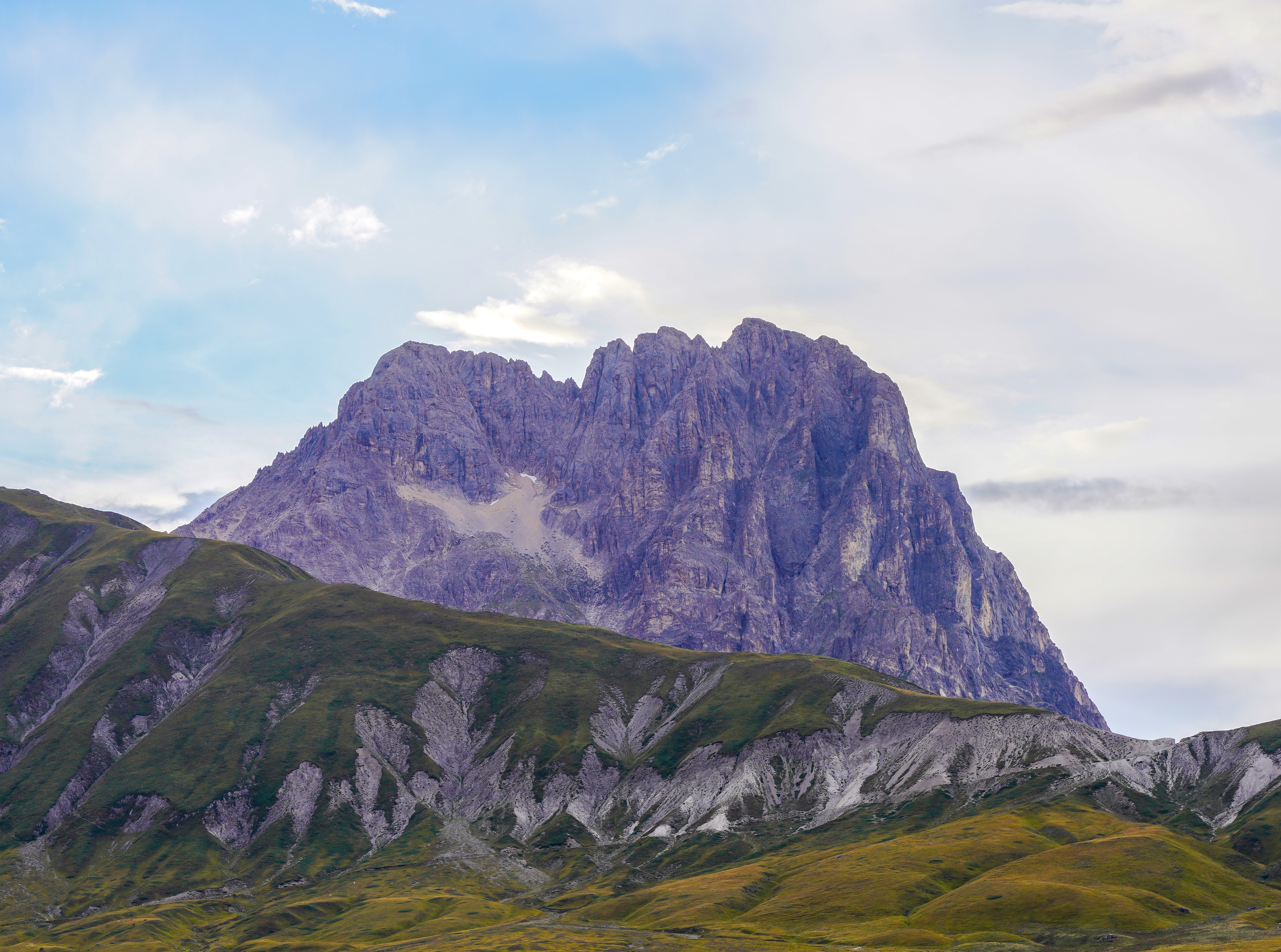
The Gran Sasso in the Apennine Mountains

The volcanism of Italy is due chiefly to the presence, a short distance to the south, of the boundary between the Eurasian Plate and the African Plate. Italy is a volcanically active country, containing the only active volcanoes in mainland Europe (while volcanic islands are also present in Greece, in the volcanic arc of the southern Aegean). The active Italian volcanoes that attract tourists are Etna, Vesuvius and Stromboli, while the extinct Italian volcanoes that are most visited by tourists are Monte Vulture, Monte Amiata and Alban Hills.

=== Hill tourism ===
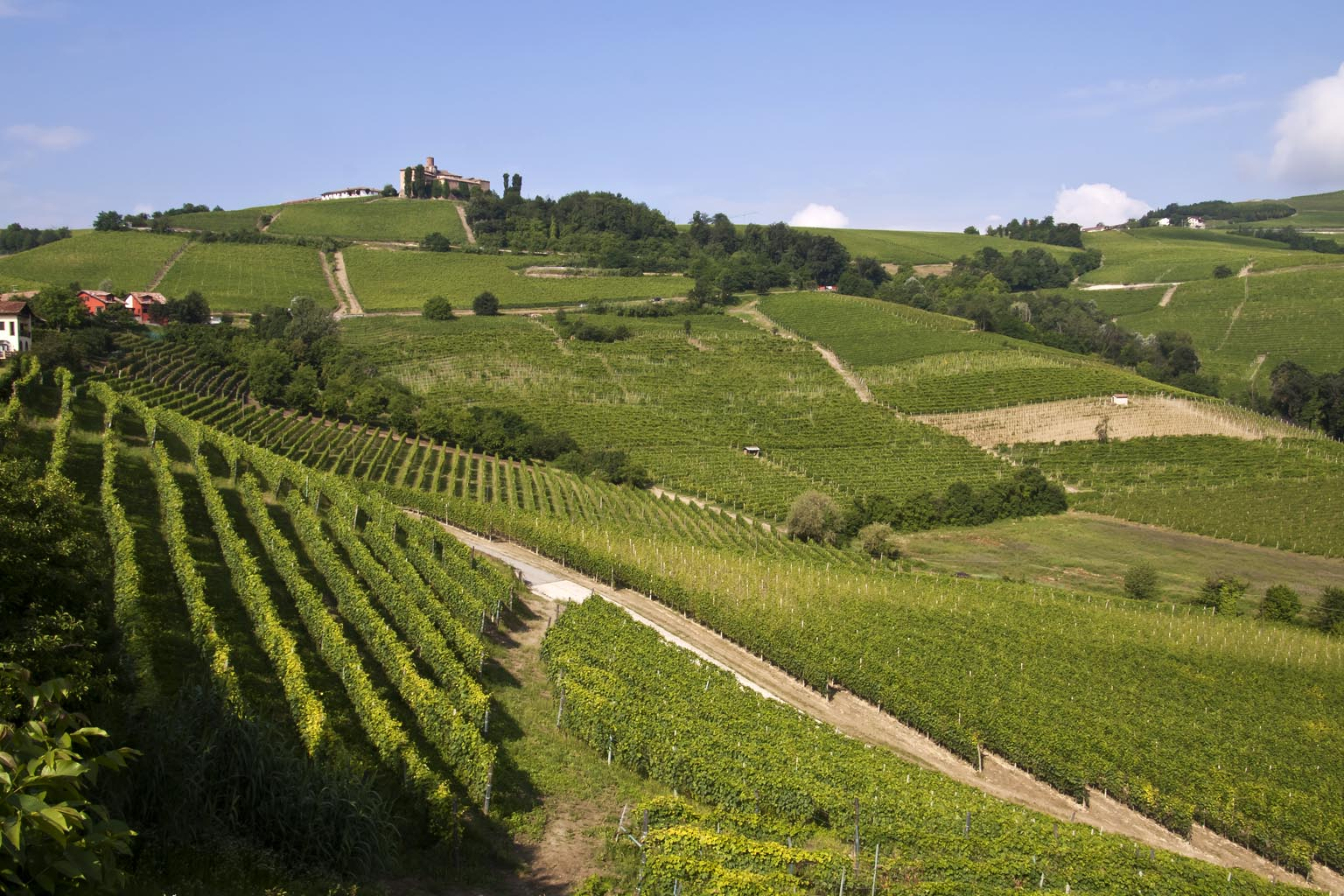
Langhe hills, Piedmont

Italy has a predominantly hilly territory (equal to 41.6% of the total area). The best known Italian hilly areas in the world are Langhe, Montferrat, Brianza, Berici Hills, Euganean Hills, Chianti, Colline Metallifere, Alban Hills, Gargano and Murge, while notable locations include Erice, Civita di Bagnoregio, Maratea, Ravello, Urbino, Brisighella, Cortona, Asolo, Ostuni and Cervo. The attraction of tourists to the Italian hills is mainly due to the mild climate, natural beauty and landscape, and historic and artistic centres, with agritourism, resorts, hotels and restaurants that are widespread in these territories.

Vineyard Landscape of Piedmont: Langhe-Roero and Monferrato is a UNESCO World Heritage Site comprising "five distinct wine-growing areas with outstanding landscapes" plus the Castle of Grinzane Cavour in the region of Piedmont, Italy. The site, which extends over hilly areas of Langhe and Montferrat, is one of the most important wine producing zones in Italy. Located in the centre of the Piedmont region (North-West of Italy), the site is inscribed as a "cultural landscape", since it is a result of the combined work of nature and man. The site is inscribed on the UNESCO World Heritage List thanks to the outstanding value of its wine culture, which has shaped the landscape over the centuries. These sites are the result of a coexisting process between humans and the environment. As a result of its heartfelt attitude to the environment, this wine region has preserved an incredible cultural heritage that has become a model for other wine districts throughout the world.

=== River and canal tourism ===
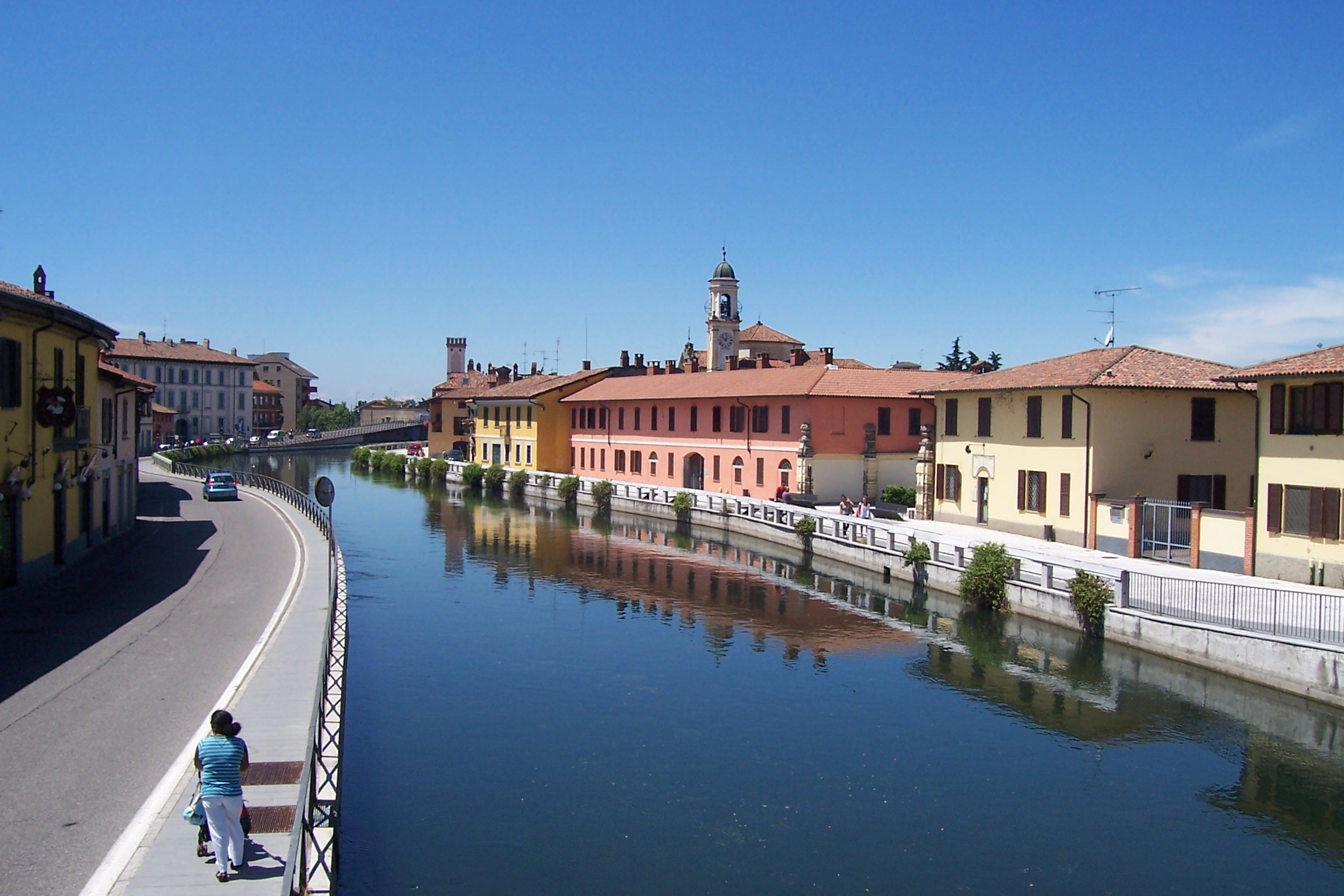
Naviglio Grande in Gaggiano, Lombardy

Italian rivers and canals attract tourists, who can travel along them both in their navigable sections with houseboats and ships, and in non-navigable sections thanks to the use of canoes and kayaks. Along the Italian rivers there are naturalistic beauties, villages and cities, historical monuments and pilgrimage routes. Some Italian rivers such as the Ticino, the Orba, the Dora Baltea and the Elvo stream are frequented by tourists who try their hand as amateur gold prospectors, given the presence in the form of specks of this metal in the waters of these waterways.

The most important Italian river that can be navigated is the Po, which with its 652 km (405 mi) in length is the longest river in Italy and which is navigable from Turin to the mouth. Along the Po there are 12 ports, 111 berths (3 in Piedmont, 39 in Lombardy, 36 in Emilia-Romagna, 33 in Veneto) and about 20 river operators who provide boat rental services and organize excursions and river cruises. Noteworthy is its delta mouth, which is one of the largest wetlands in Europe and the Mediterranean area, and which is rich in naturalistic beauties. From the river Po it is possible to reach, directly or indirectly by sailing along its tributaries, the cities of Cremona, Mantua, Parma, Padua and Verona.

The Brenta river is navigable from Padua to Venice, where it has its mouth. Another noteworthy Italian river is the Sile, which is navigable from Treviso to the mouth, which is located near Jesolo. Also important is the network of rivers and artificial canals are present between Friuli-Venezia Giulia and the Venetian Lagoon, which is formed by 109 km (68 mi) of navigable canals. Also noteworthy is the Padana waterway, which connects Mantua to the sea via the Mincio river and the Po.

As far as the navigable canals are concerned, worthy of note is the touristic navigation service of the Lombard Navigli, which is an urban transport network in the Milan area integrated by some lines of boats along these canals. The tourist lines connect the dock of Milan with numerous comuni that rise along the Naviglio Grande up to Abbiategrasso and Turbigo. Tourist navigation is also present along the Naviglio Martesana, in the stretch from Trezzo sull'Adda to Vaprio d'Adda.

=== Underwater tourism ===
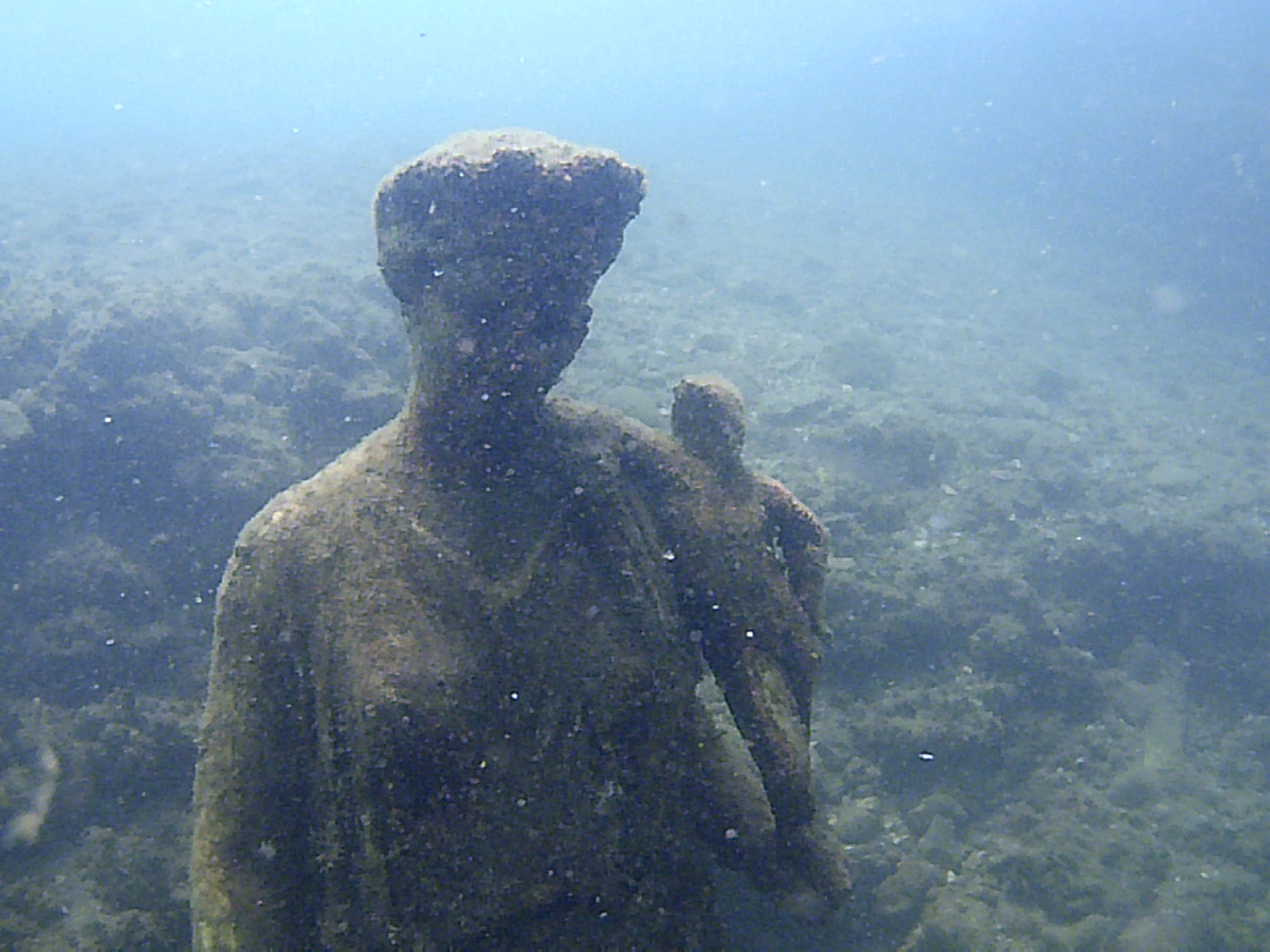
Submerged Archaeological Park of Baiae

The Marine Protected Areas of Italy restrict human activity for a conservation purpose, to protect natural resources or archaeological sites. There were twenty-seven such marine protected areas, and a further two "Submerged Archaeological Parks" (Italian: parchi sommersi); in 2018, two new marine protected areas were created. these areas help safeguard in total some 228,000 hectares (2,280 km^{2}) of the seas around Italy as well as some 700 kilometres (430 mi) of its coastline, corresponding to 12% of the Italian coasts.

Underwater tourism, both of a naturalistic type and linked to underwater archaeology, is also present. For the naturalistic underwater type, noteworthy seaside locations include the Portofino Marine Protected Area (located between the municipalities of Camogli, Portofino and Santa Margherita Ligure), the island of Giglio, the island of Capraia, and the Maddalena archipelago.

For the underwater archeology type, noteworthy seaside locations include Taormina, Capo Passero, Ustica, Noto, Marettimo, Marzamemi, Santa Maria di Castellabate, Baiae, Gaiola, Ischia, Campi Flegrei, Pantelleria, Syracuse, Gnatia, Tremiti Islands, Manduria and Isola di Capo Rizzuto.

Notable Italian lakes that attract underwater tourism, both archaeological and naturalistic type, are Lake Iseo, Lake Como, Lake Garda, Lake Maggiore, Lake Idro, Lago di Levico, Lago di Lases, Lago di Tovel, Lago di Caldonazzo, Lago Grande and Lake of Capodacqua.

=== Christmas, New Year's Eve and Easter tourism ===
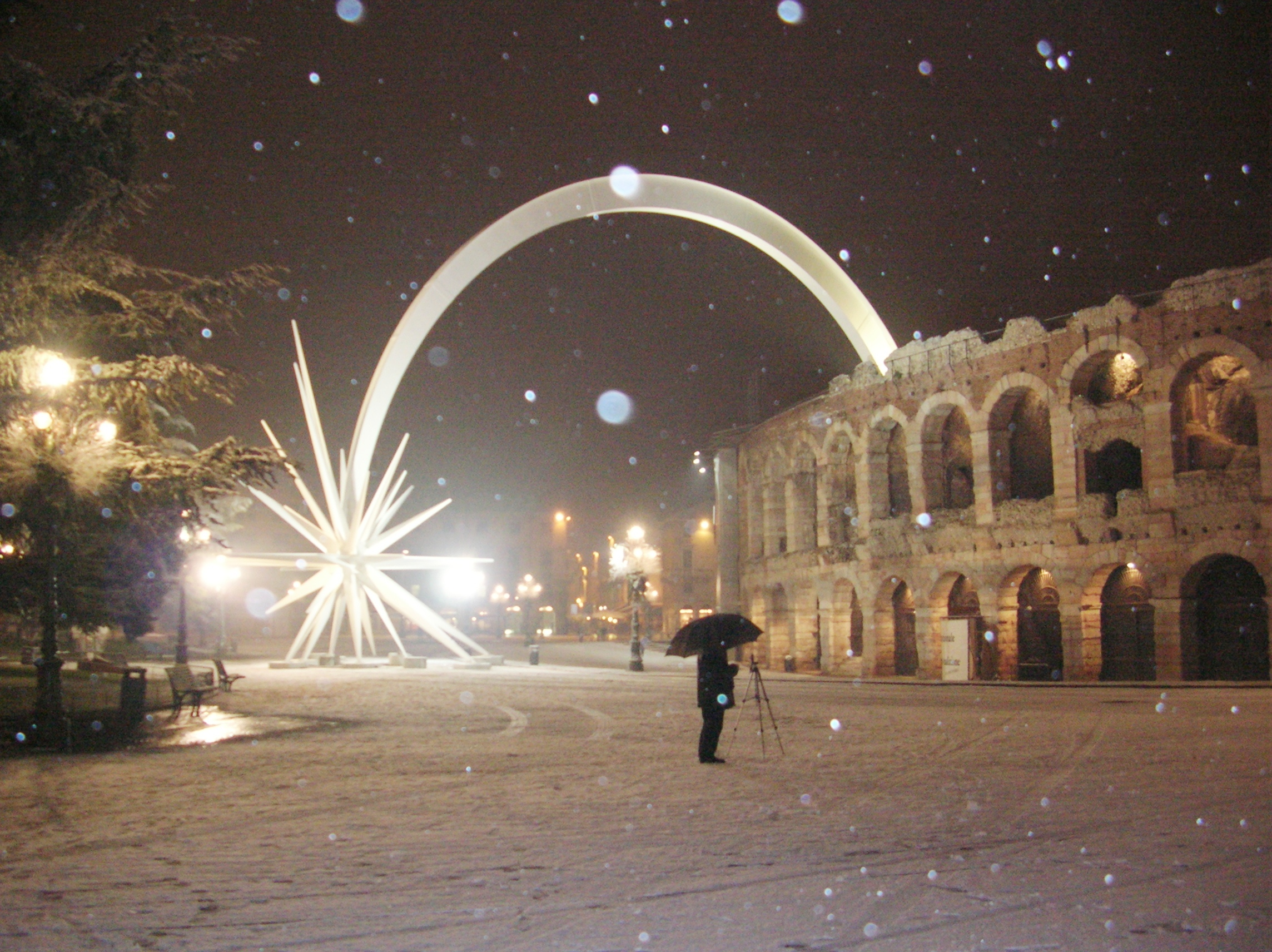
Christmas lights in Verona, Veneto

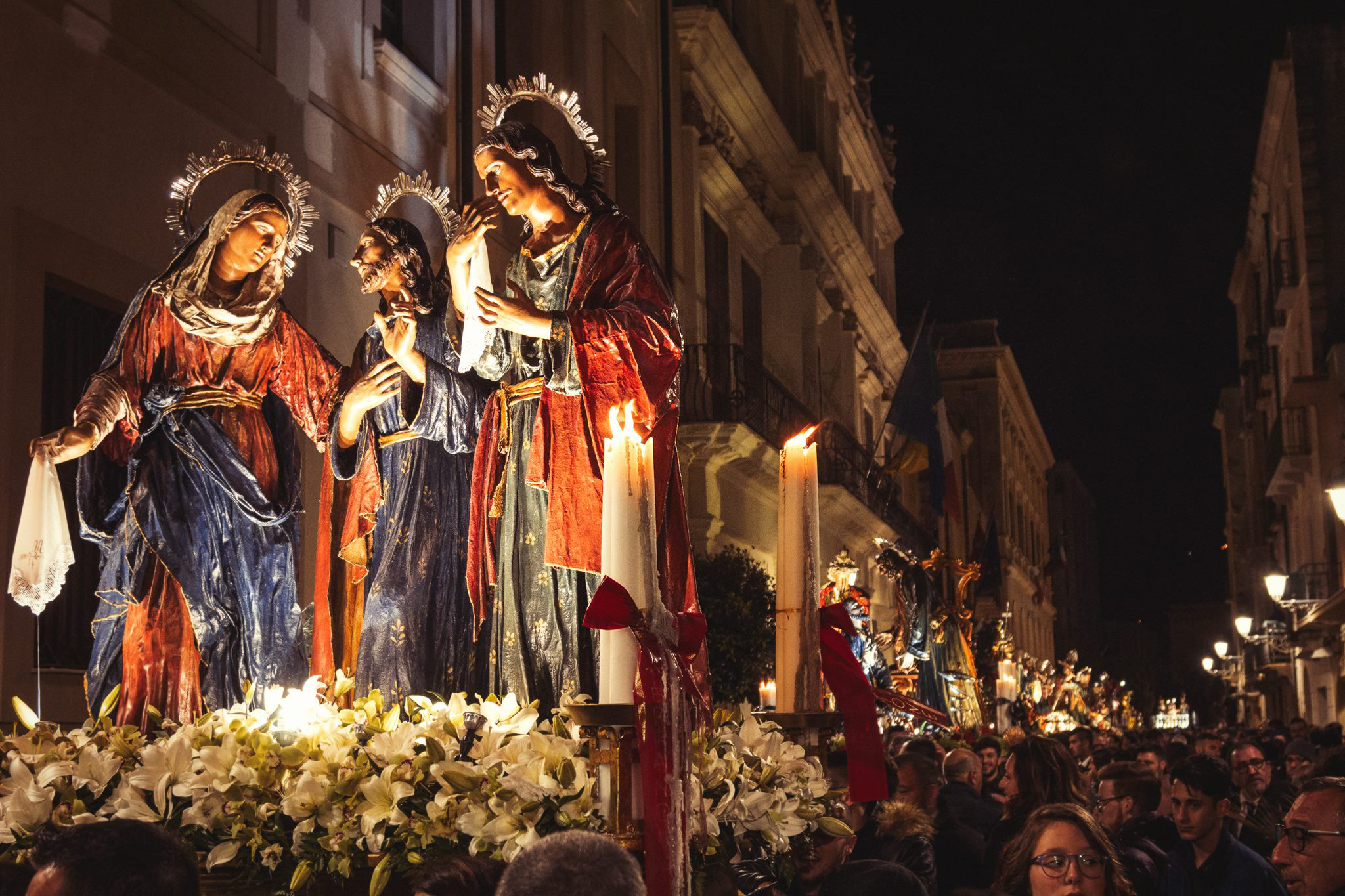
The "Misteri", the Holy Week procession in Trapani, Sicily

Christmas in Italy begins on 8 December, with the Feast of the Immaculate Conception, a public holiday in Italy and the day on which traditionally the Christmas tree is mounted and ends on 6 January, of the following year with the Epiphany. 26 December (Saint Stephen's Day, in Italian Giorno di Santo Stefano), is also a public holiday. The tradition of the nativity scene comes from Italy. What is considered the first nativity scene in history (a living nativity scene) was set up by St. Francis Of Assisi in Greccio in 1223. It seems that the first Christmas tree in Italy was erected at the Quirinal Palace at the behest of Queen Margherita, towards the end of the 19th century. In Italy, the oldest Christmas market is considered to be that of Bologna, held for the first time in the 18th century and linked to the feast of Saint Lucy.

Italy is among the countries most visited in the world by tourists during the Christmas holidays. The attraction factors are the not too harsh climate, the cultural offer of the cities including museums, exhibitions and party initiatives, the rich gastronomy as well as the more affordable prices compared to other countries. Italy is the second European country most visited by European tourists during the Christmas holidays behind Spain and ahead of Portugal, France and the United Kingdom. The Italian cities most visited by international tourists during the Christmas holidays are, in order, Milan, Rome, Naples, Catania, Palermo and Cagliari. Milan, in particular, is the favourite destination by European tourists for Germans, British and Portuguese tourists and the second for French, Spaniards and Dutch tourists.

Easter in Italy (Italian: Pasqua) is one of the country's major holidays. Easter in Italy enters Holy Week with Palm Sunday, Maundy Thursday, Good Friday and Holy Saturday, concluding with Easter Day and Easter Monday. Each day has a special significance. The Holy Weeks worthy of note in Italy are the Processione dei Misteri di Trapani, the Holy Week in Barcellona Pozzo di Gotto and the Holy Week in Ruvo di Puglia. Italy is one of the most visited countries in the world during the Easter holidays. Italy is the second European country most visited by international tourists during the Easter holidays behind Spain and ahead of France and Greece. The Italian cities most visited by international tourists during the Easter holidays are, in order, Rome, Milan, Venice, Naples, Florence and Bologna.

=== Shopping tourism ===
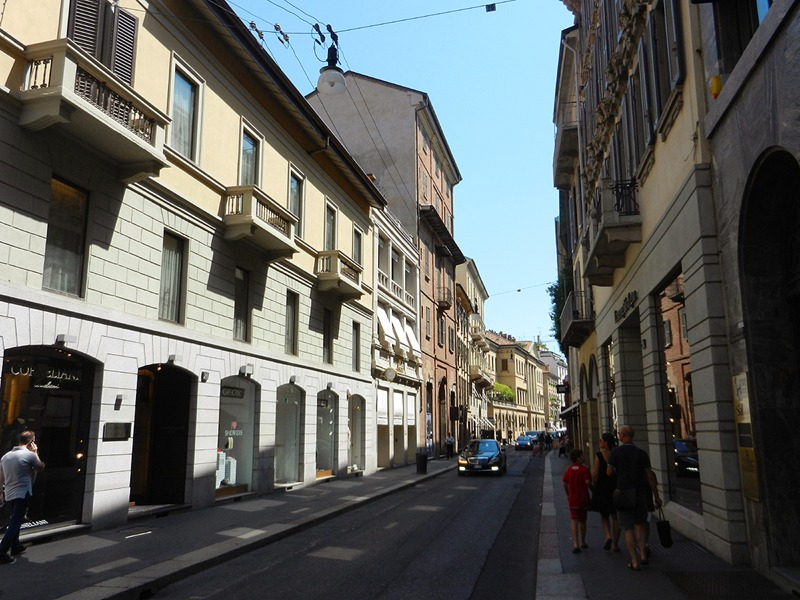
Via Monte Napoleone, Quadrilatero della moda, Milan, Lombardy

Italy is also a destination for shopping tourism. Italian fashion has a long tradition. The shops that attract the most tourists are those of clothing, leather goods and cosmetics and perfumery, while the most visited Italian cities for this type of tourism are, in descending order of visits, Milan, Florence, Rome, Venice and Turin.

In Milan the most important shopping streets are Via Monte Napoleone, Via della Spiga, Via Manzoni, Corso Venezia, Via Sant'Andrea, Corso Vittorio Emanuele, Corso Buenos Aires, Corso di Porta Ticinese, Via Torino and Corso XXII Marzo, while in Florence they are Via de' Tornabuoni, Via dei Calzaiuoli, Via del Corso, Mercato di San Lorenzo and Via Santo Spirito.

In Rome the most important shopping streets are Via Condotti, Piazza di Spagna, Via del Babuino, Via Borgognona, Via Frattina, Via del Corso, Via del Campo Marzio, Via del Pellegrino, Via del Boschetto, Via Cola di Rienzo, Via del Governo Vecchio, Viale Guglielmo Marconi, Via Appia Nuova and Via Tuscolana, while in Venice they are Le Mercerie, Piazza San Marco, Campo San Paolo, Burano and Murano.

In Turin the most important shopping streets are Via Garibaldi, Contrada dei Guardinfanti, Galleria Subalpina, Via Roma, Piazza San Carlo a large number of visitors for, Piazza Carignano, Via Cesare Battisti, Piazza Carlo Alberto, Piazza Bodoni, Via Mazzini, Via Lagrange, Via Carlo Alberto, Piazza Carlo Felice, Via Po and Piazza Vittorio.

Shopping tourism in Italy is also aimed at outlet stores. The outlets that attract the most tourists are located in Serravalle Scrivia, Castel San Pietro Romano, Barberino di Mugello, Noventa di Piave and Marcianise.

=== Spa tourism ===
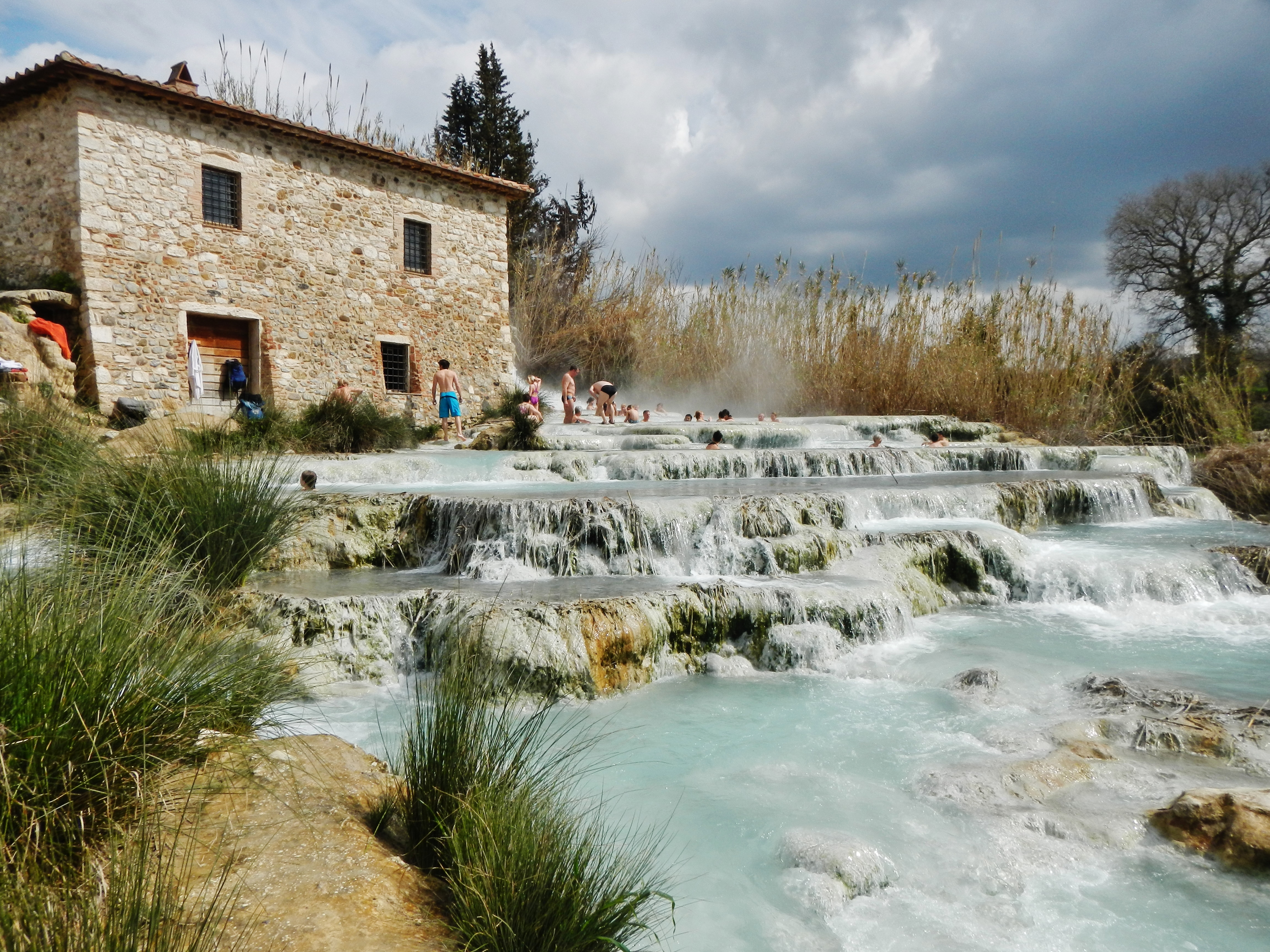
Spa in Saturnia, Tuscany

Italy has one of the largest number of spas in the world, and are appreciated internationally for the quality and effectiveness of the services and treatments offered. This is also due to secondary volcanic phenomena that give rise to the emission of water, vapours and mud enriched by substances present in the Italian subsoil.

Its origins are very remote, it is known that the ancient Greeks had already discovered its healing properties, but the greatest admirers of antiquity were undoubtedly the ancient Romans who made it an aspect of their social life.

The most renowned Italian spas are located in the localities of Abano Terme, Cortina d'Ampezzo, Bibione, Chianciano Terme, Montepulciano, Saturnia, Montecatini Terme, Contursi Terme, Castellammare di Stabia, Bagni San Filippo, Sirmione, Bormio, Viterbo, Pantelleria, Vulcano, Montegrotto Terme, Pescantina, Salsomaggiore Terme and Ischia.

=== Wedding tourism ===
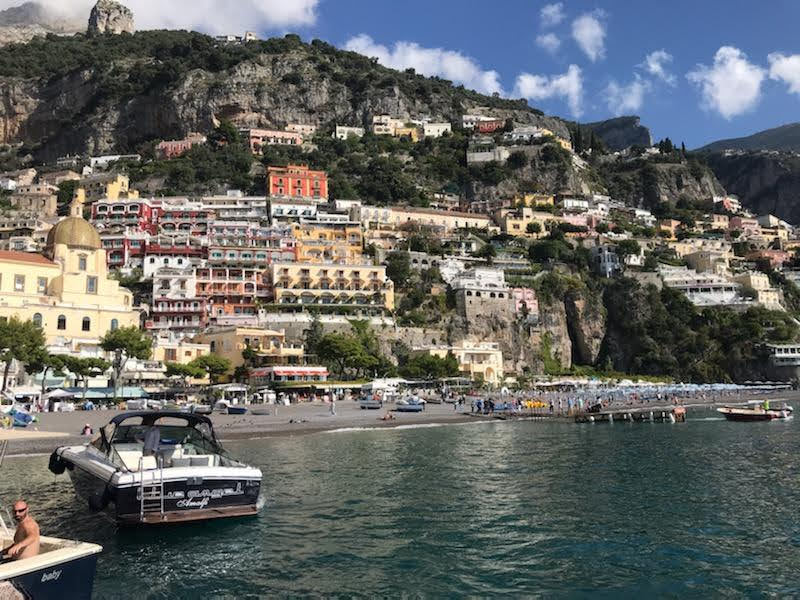
Positano, Campania

Italy is the second-most popular destination in the world for wedding tourism after the Maldives and before Bali. In 2022, 11,000 weddings were celebrated in Italy by foreign citizens who came to stay in the country to organize the wedding ceremony. The length of stay of married couples and their guests to the ceremony is on average 3.3 nights. In 2022, there were a total of 619,000 arrivals and over 2 million tourists connected to wedding tourism, with a turnover of around €599 million. Italy hosts three of the top five European honeymoon destinations for wedding tourists: Positano, Rome and the Amalfi Coast.

The Italian region chosen for marriage in Italy by foreign couples the most was Tuscany, with 21% of the total, followed by Lombardy, Campania, Apulia, Sicily, Lazio and Piedmont.

In 2022, 57% of marriages celebrated in Italy by foreign couples were connected to spouses and guests from other European countries, while the main country of origin (29.2%) of foreign couples who decided to celebrate their wedding in Italy was the United States, followed by the United Kingdom, Germany and France. Domestic wedding tourism is also noteworthy, given that in 2022 there were around 7,160 weddings of Italian couples celebrated in a region other than their own.

Weddings of famous foreign couples include those between David Bowie and Iman Abdulmajid in Florence in the American church of San Giacomo, between Tom Cruise and Katie Holmes on Lake Bracciano, between George Clooney and Amal Alamuddin at Palazzo Papadopoli in Venice, between Kim Kardashian and Kanye West at Forte Belvedere in Florence and between Justin Timberlake and Jessica Biel at Borgo Egnazia in Apulia.

=== Religious tourism ===
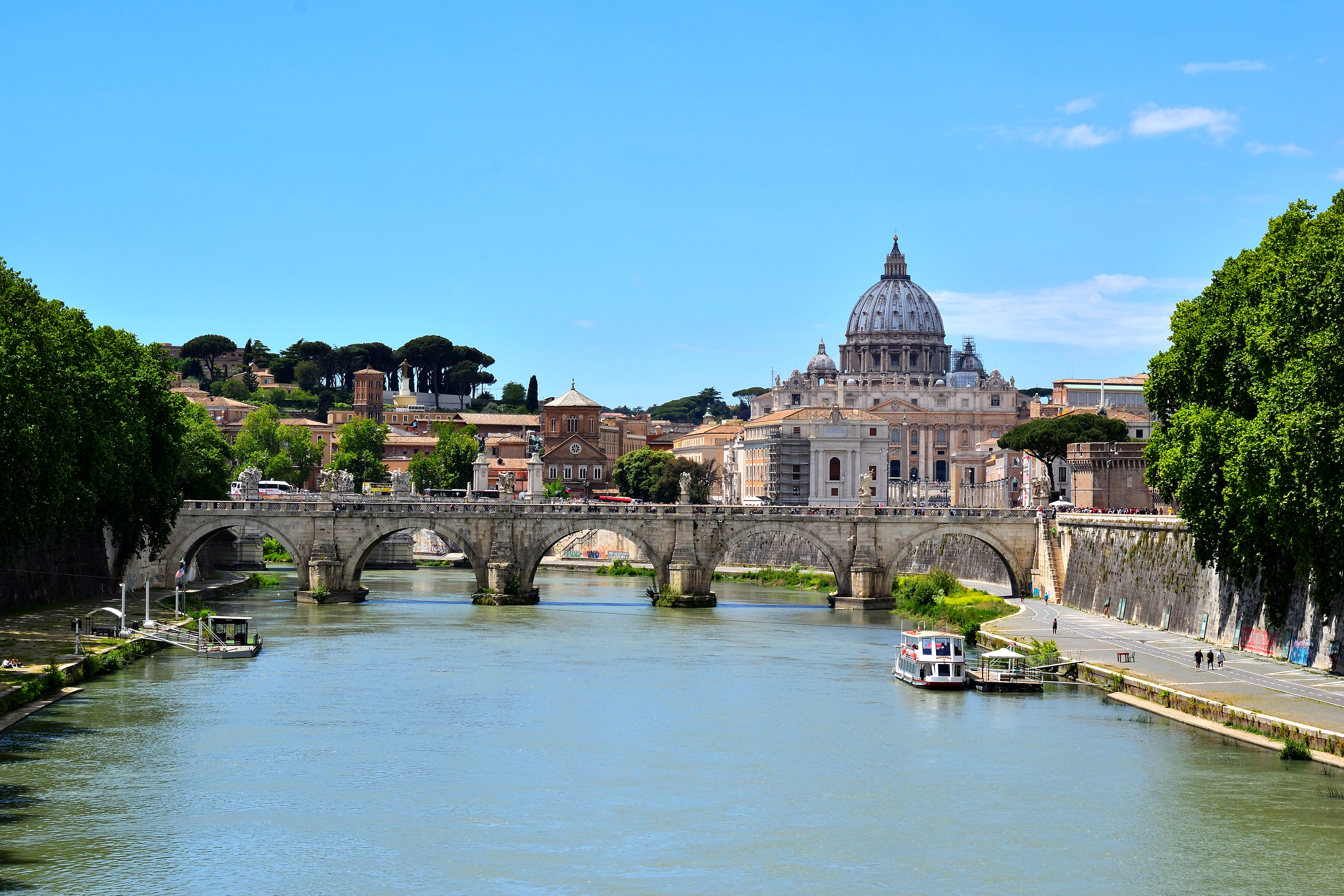
St. Peter's Basilica viewed from the Tiber; the Vatican Hill in the back and Castel Sant'Angelo in Rome to the right. Both the basilica and the hill are part of the sovereign state of Vatican City, the Holy See of the Catholic Church.

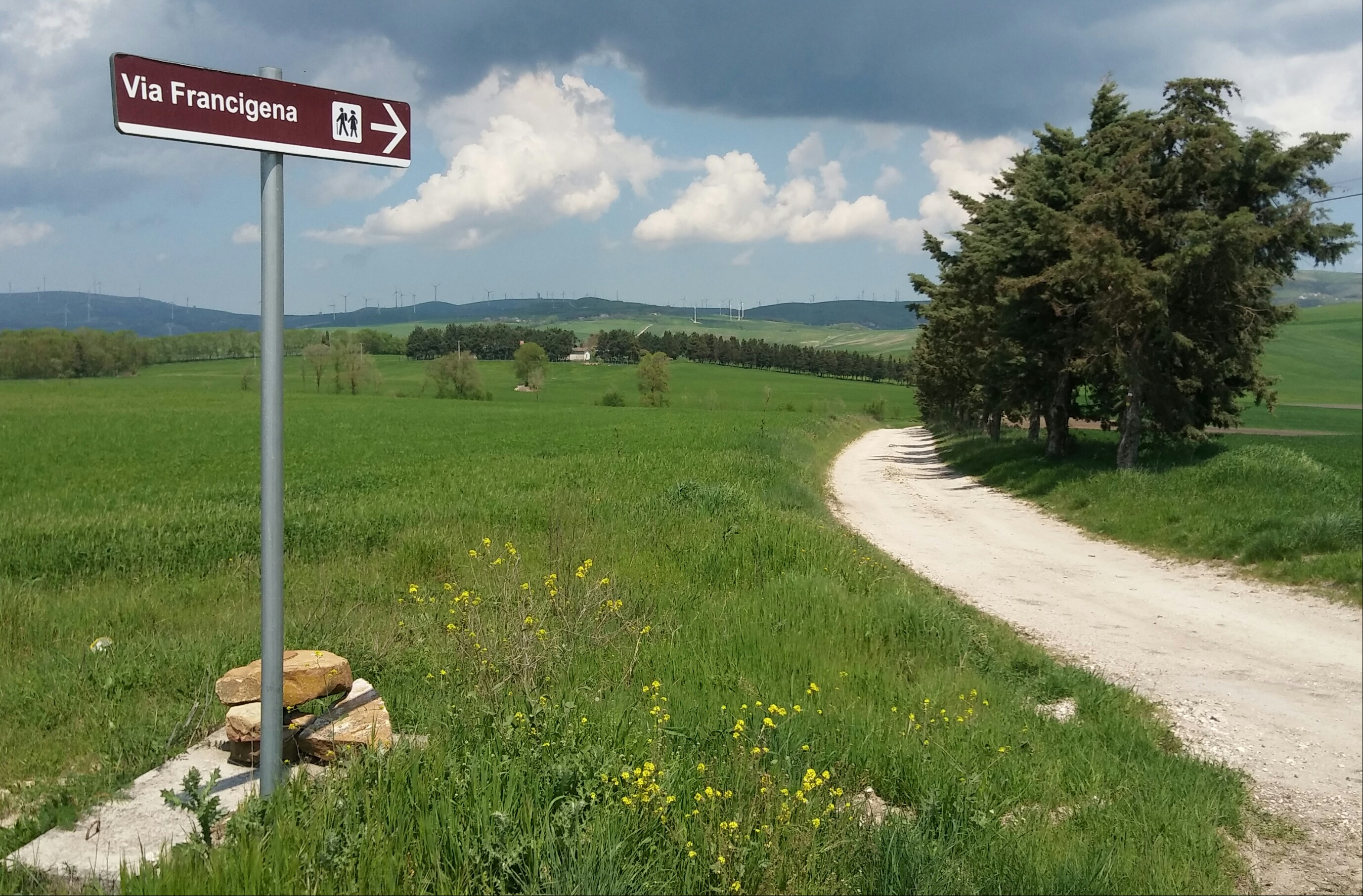
The Via Francigena in Ariano Irpino, Campania

There are numerous pilgrimage destinations in Italy, first of all Rome, the residence of the Pope (who is its bishop) and the seat of the Catholic Church. The city is a pilgrimage destination especially during the main events of Catholic religious life, especially during the Jubilees. Although his figure is not officially recognized by the faithful of other Christian denominations, the presence of the Pope in Rome also attracts others and is an important figure within the Christian creed.

The Seven Pilgrim Churches of Rome are Basilica of St. John Lateran (Major Papal archbasilica), St. Peter's Basilica (Major Papal basilica), Basilica of Saint Paul Outside the Walls (Major Papal basilica), Basilica of St. Mary Major (Major Papal basilica), Basilica of Saint Lawrence outside the Walls (Minor Papal basilica), Basilica of the Holy Cross in Jerusalem (Minor basilica), Sanctuary of Our Lady of Divine Love (Shrine). In addition to the Holy See, there are numerous pilgrimage sites given by the presence of relics and remains of important figures linked to Christianity, rather than by the memory of events that have occurred that the faithful consider miraculous.

Notable churches that are a destination for pilgrimages, in addition to St. Peter's Basilica in Rome, include Sanctuary of Saint Pio of Pietrelcina in San Giovanni Rotondo, Basilica of Saint Francis of Assisi, Basilica della Santa Casa in Loreto, Shrine of the Virgin of the Rosary of Pompei, Basilica of Saint Anthony of Padua, Basilica santuario Madonna delle Lacrime in Syracuse, Church of St. Mary of Mount Berico in Vicenza, Basilica of San Vitale in Ravenna, Basilica of Sant'Apollinare Nuovo in Ravenna and Sanctuary of the Madonna of San Luca in Bologna.

The Via Francigena is an ancient road and pilgrimage route running from the cathedral city of Canterbury in England, through France and Switzerland, to Rome and then to Apulia, Italy, where there were ports of embarkation for the Holy Land. In medieval times it was an important road and pilgrimage route for those wishing to visit the Holy See and the tombs of the apostles Peter and Paul. Today the Via Francigena is travelled by pilgrims, especially in the last stretch of the road, the one in Italian territory. Along the Via Francigena there are numerous places of worship such as sanctuaries, convents and churches that attract pilgrims and tourists, also for their artistic and architectural beauties.

The Cammino Celeste ("Celestial Way") is also very popular with pilgrims. It is a network of pilgrimage routes that connects the places of worship of Aquileia in Italy, Maria Saal in Austria and Brezje in Slovenia with the Sanctuary of Monte Lussari, located in the Julian Alps in the Italian municipality of Tarvisio, made official as an international pilgrimage route in the summer of 2006. Its name derives from the union of the numerous places of ancient Marian devotion it passed through.

=== Naturalistic tourism ===
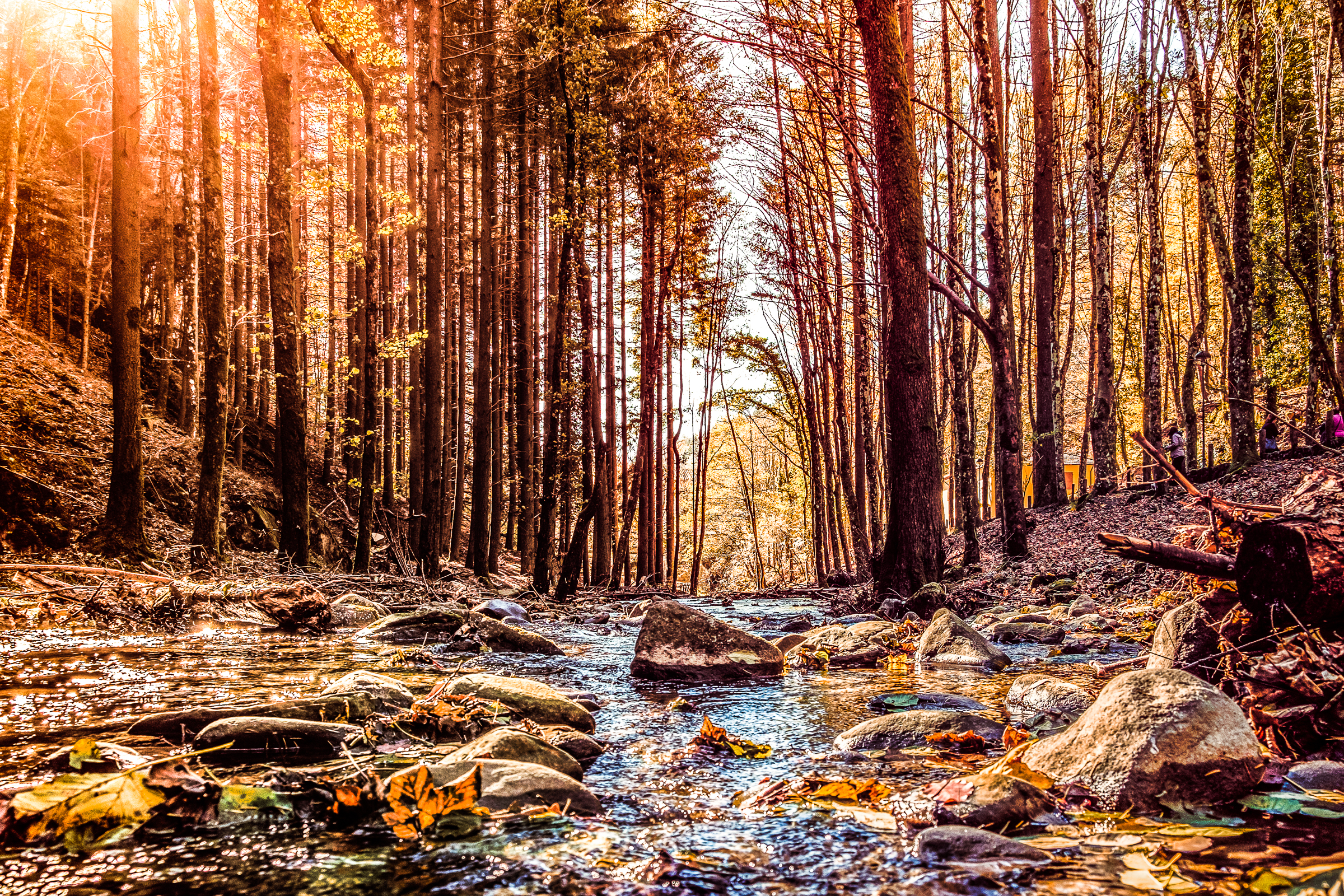
Casentinesi Forests, Emilia-Romagna

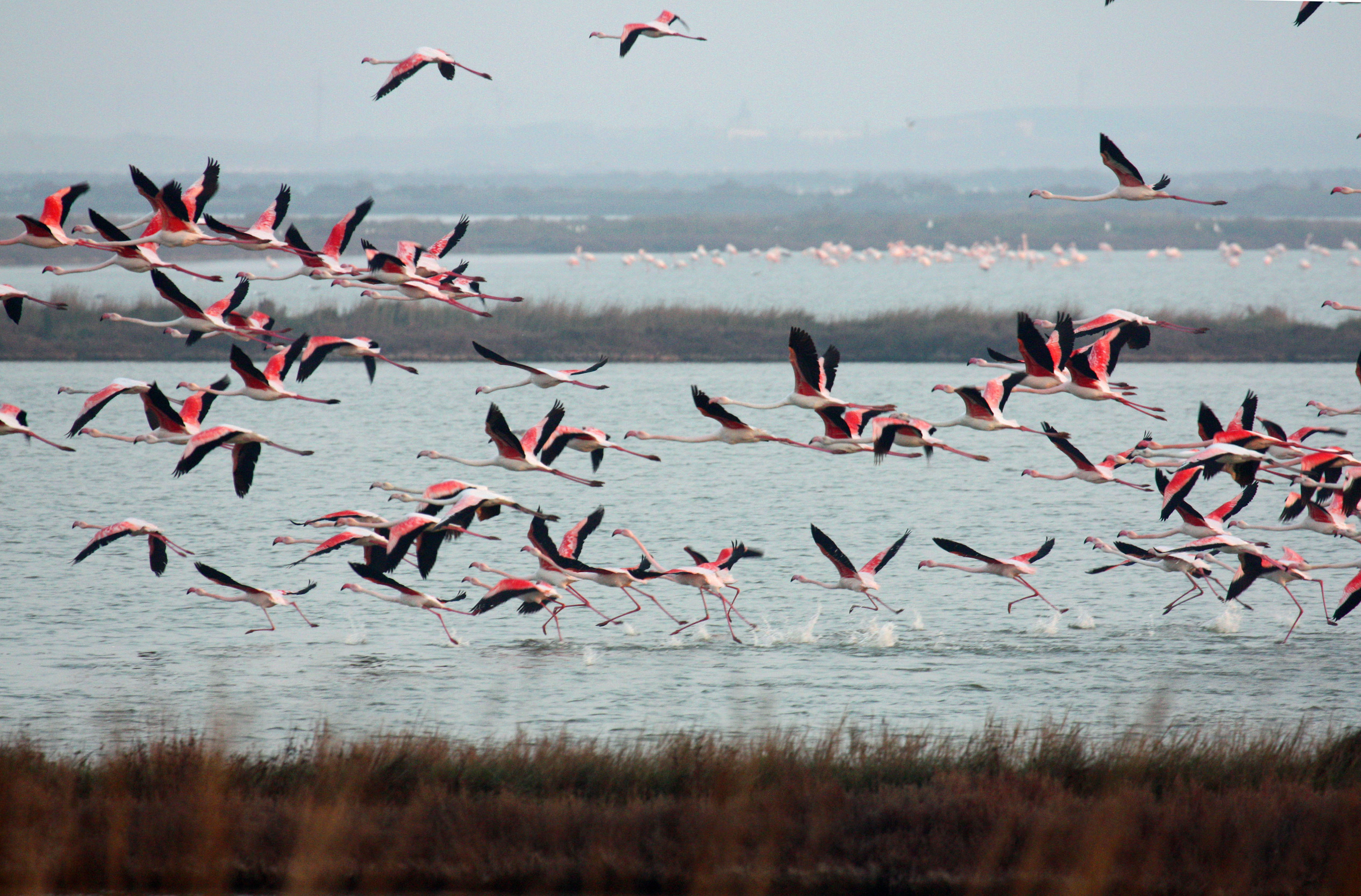
Flamingos in the delta of the Po river

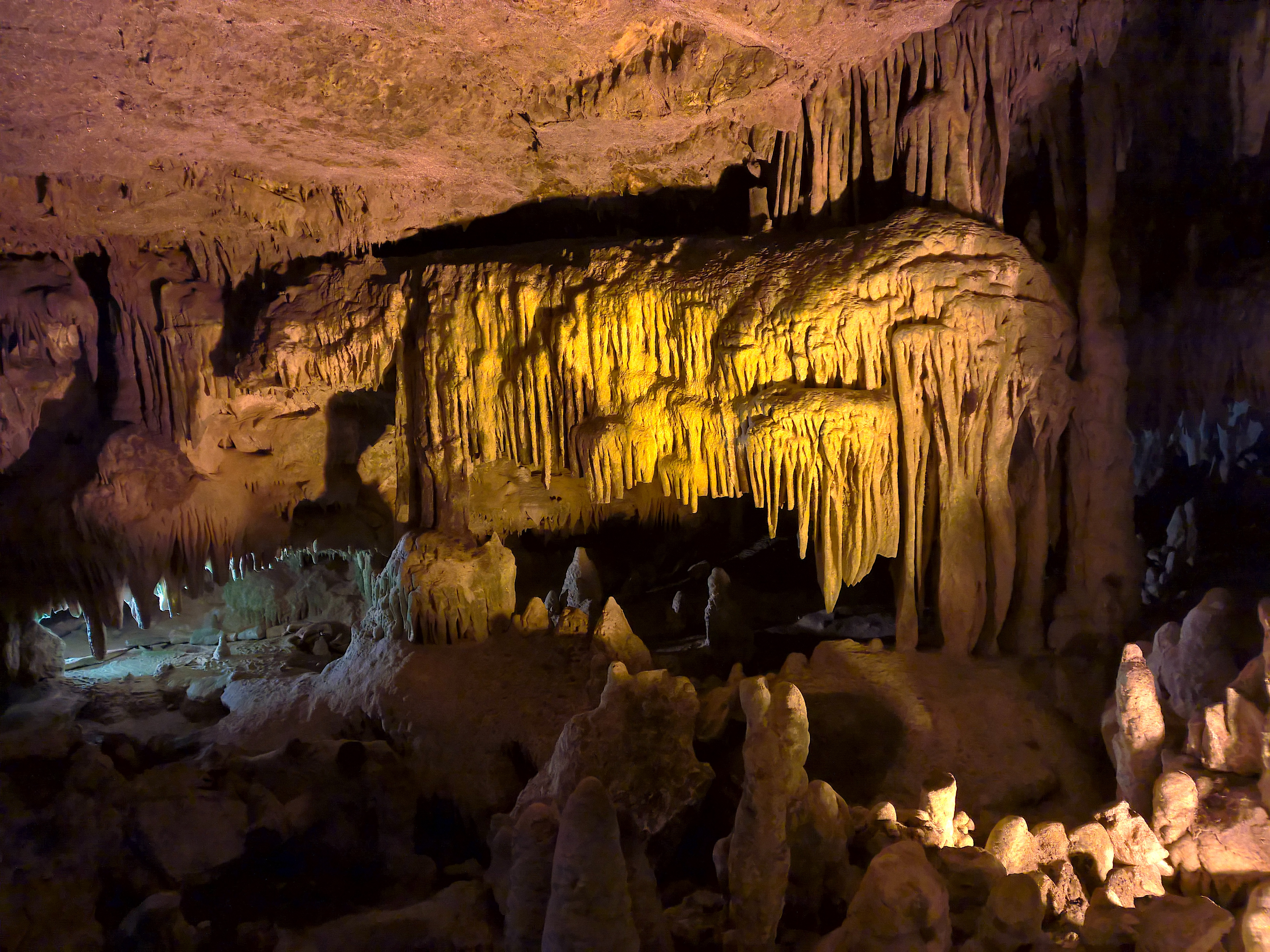
Castellana Caves, Apulia

In Italy, there are several protected areas of various types: natural, mountain or marine parks, regional or local parks, and natural, wildlife or zoological reserves. In addition to this, there are numerous natural sites not necessarily protected by a park.

The parks of Italy include areas of land, sea, rivers and their banks, lakes and their environs which have environmental or naturalistic importance and are often valued for their landscape features and for representing particular local traditions. National parks of Italy cover about 5% of the country, while the total area protected by national parks, regional parks of Italy and nature reserves covers about 10.5% of the Italian territory, to which must be added 12% of coasts protected by Marine Protected Areas of Italy.

Italy has one the highest levels of faunal biodiversity in Europe, with over 57,000 species recorded, representing more than a third of all European fauna. The fauna of Italy includes 4,777 endemic animal species, which include the Sardinian long-eared bat, Sardinian red deer, spectacled salamander, brown cave salamander, Italian newt, Italian frog, Apennine yellow-bellied toad, Italian wall lizard, Aeolian wall lizard, Sicilian wall lizard, Italian Aesculapian snake, and Sicilian pond turtle. In Italy there are 119 mammals species, 550 bird species, 69 reptile species, 39 amphibian species, 623 fish species and 56,213 invertebrate species, of which 37,303 insect species.

The flora of Italy was traditionally estimated to comprise about 5,500 vascular plant species. However, as of 2005, 6,759 species are recorded in the Data bank of Italian vascular flora. Italy has 1,371 endemic plant species and subspecies, which include Sicilian Fir, Barbaricina columbine, Sea marigold, Lavender cotton and Ucriana violet.

Italy has many botanical gardens and historic gardens, some of which are known outside the country. The Italian garden is stylistically based on symmetry, axial geometry and on the principle of imposing order over nature. It influenced the history of gardening, especially French gardens and English gardens. The Italian garden was influenced by Roman gardens and Italian Renaissance gardens.

The Italian caves attract around 1.5 million tourists every year. Main concentration of Italian caves is close to the Alps and the Apennins, principally due to karst. Notable Italian caves are Castellana Caves, Frasassi Caves, Pertosa Cave, Giant Cave, Castelcivita Cave, Toirano Caves, Pastena Caves, Borgio Verezzi Caves, Grotto Calgeron, Grotta del Cavallone, Ear of Dionysius, Grotta del Gelo, Grotta di Ispinigoli, Paglicci Cave, Grotta dell'Addaura, Arene Candide, Castelcivita Caves, Fumane Cave, Neptune's Grotto, Nereo Cave, Pertosa Caves, Grotta dello Smeraldo and Blue Grotto.

=== Business tourism ===
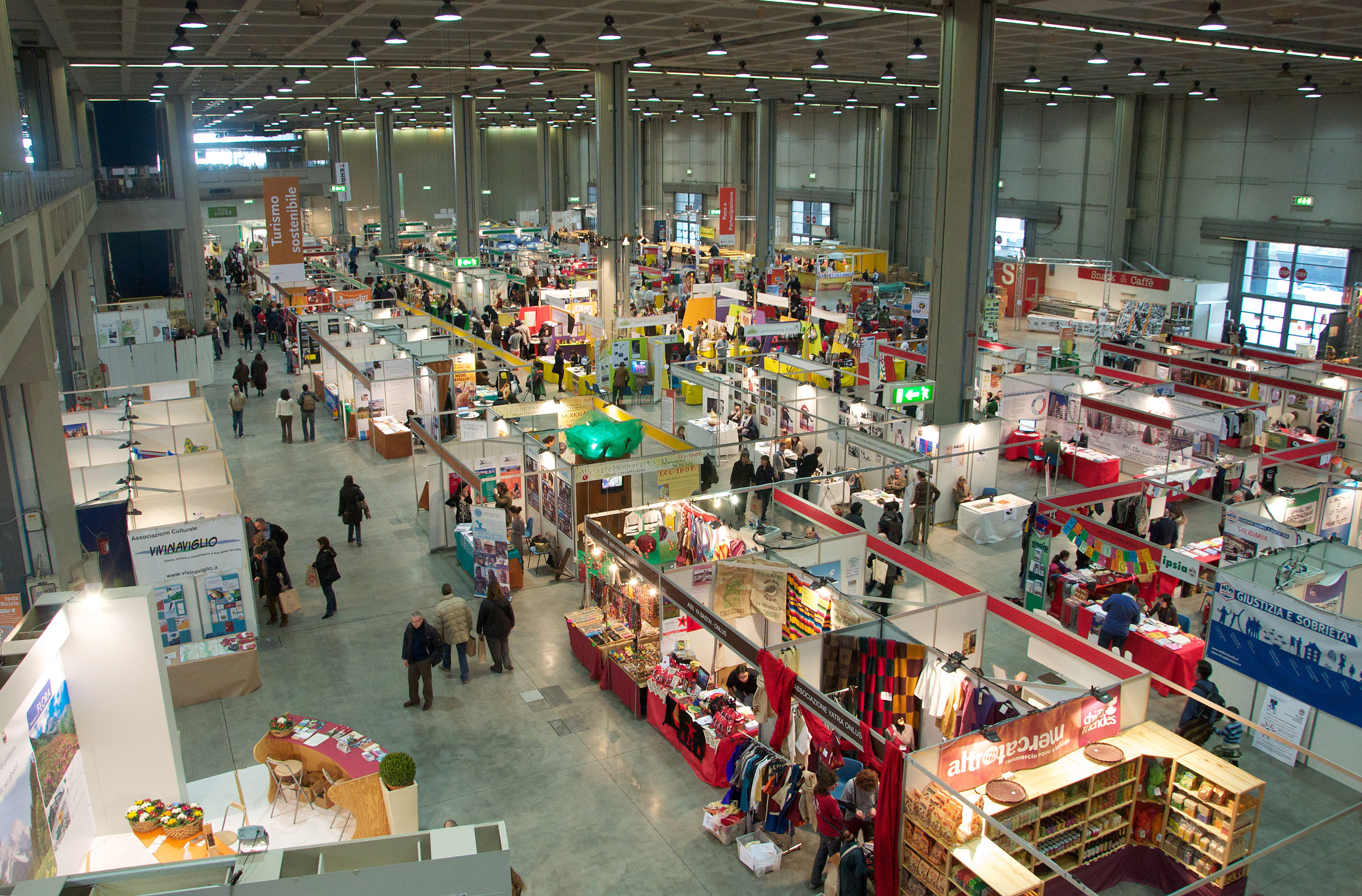
Fiera Milano

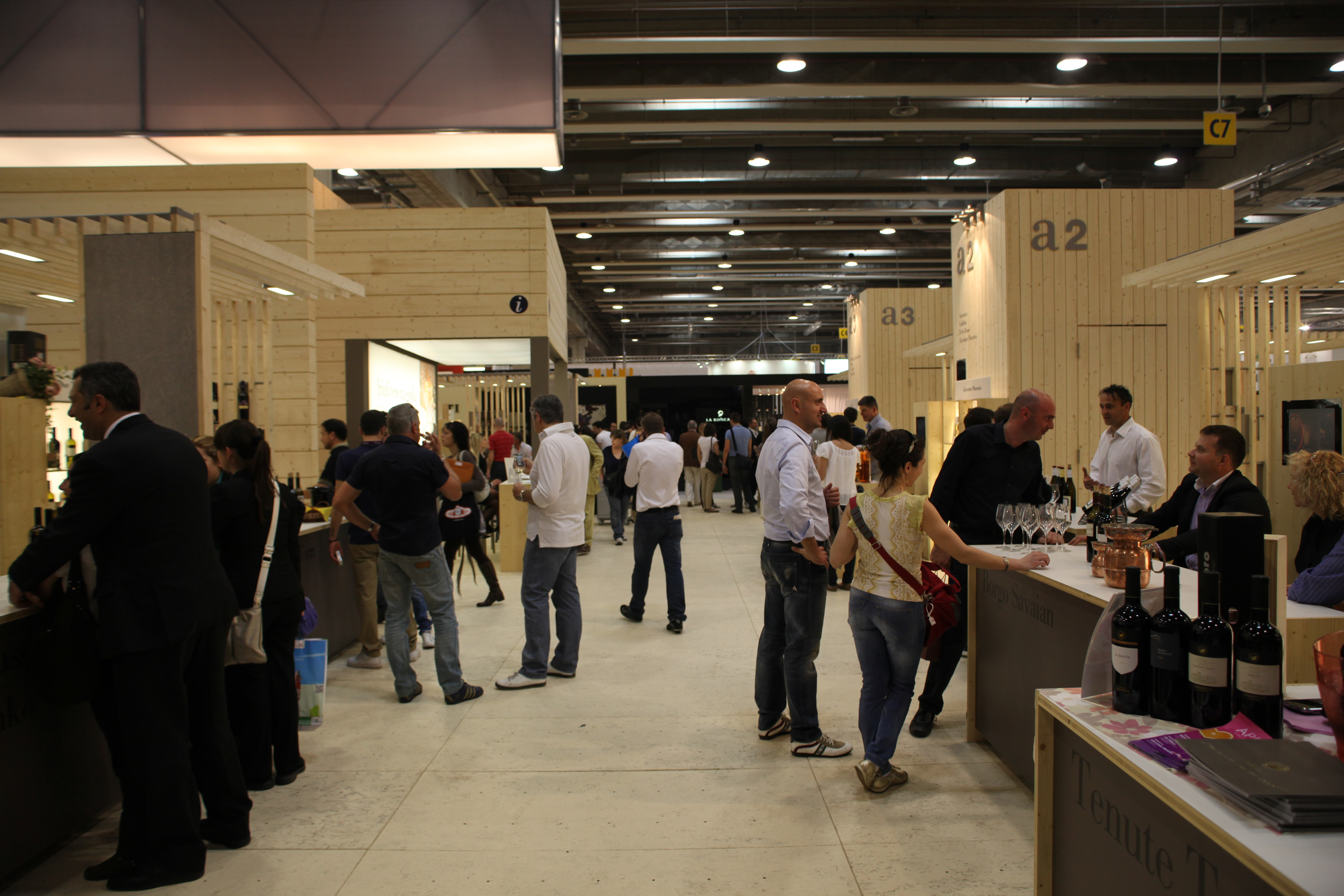
Vinitaly

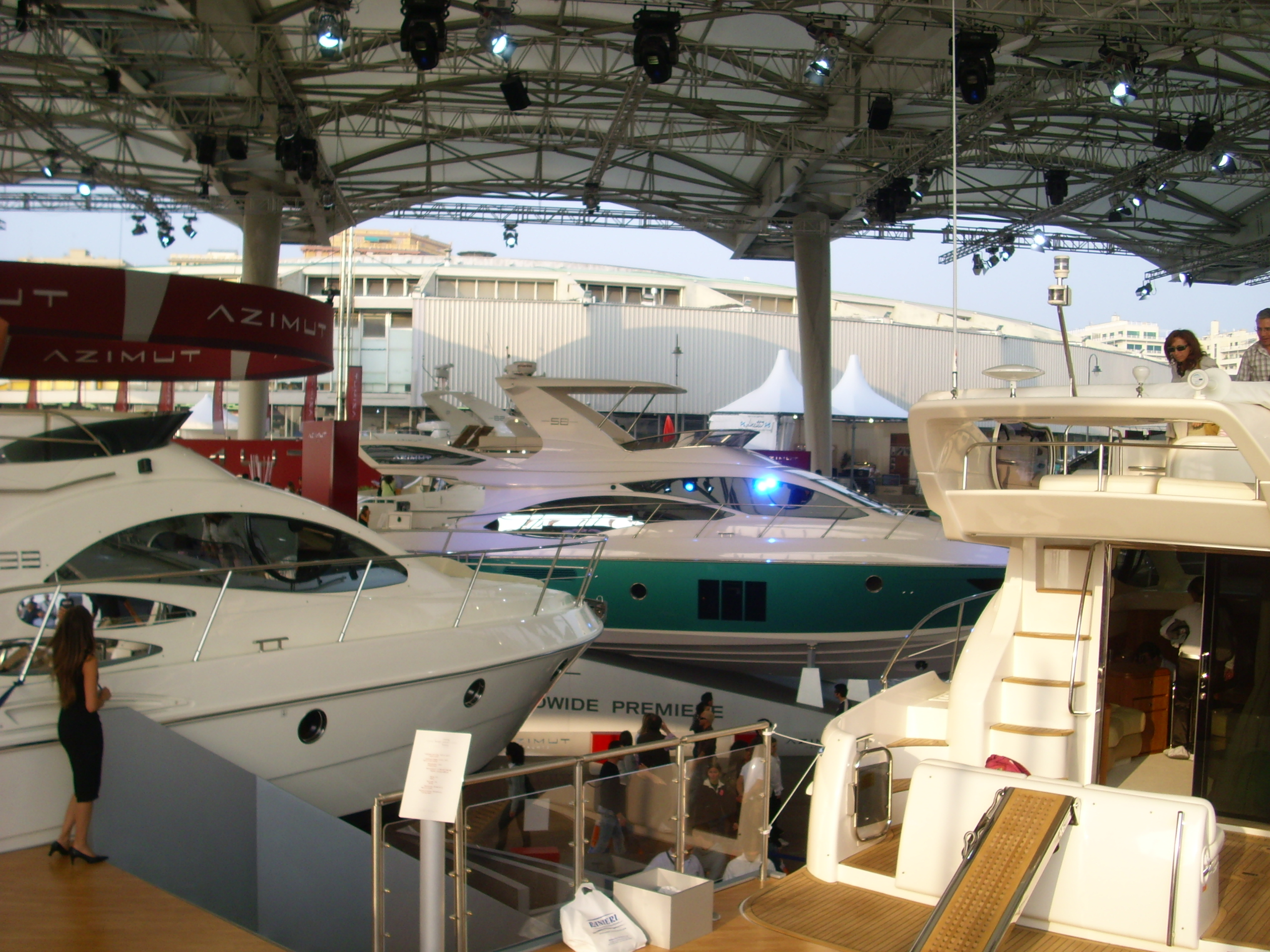
Genoa International Boat Show

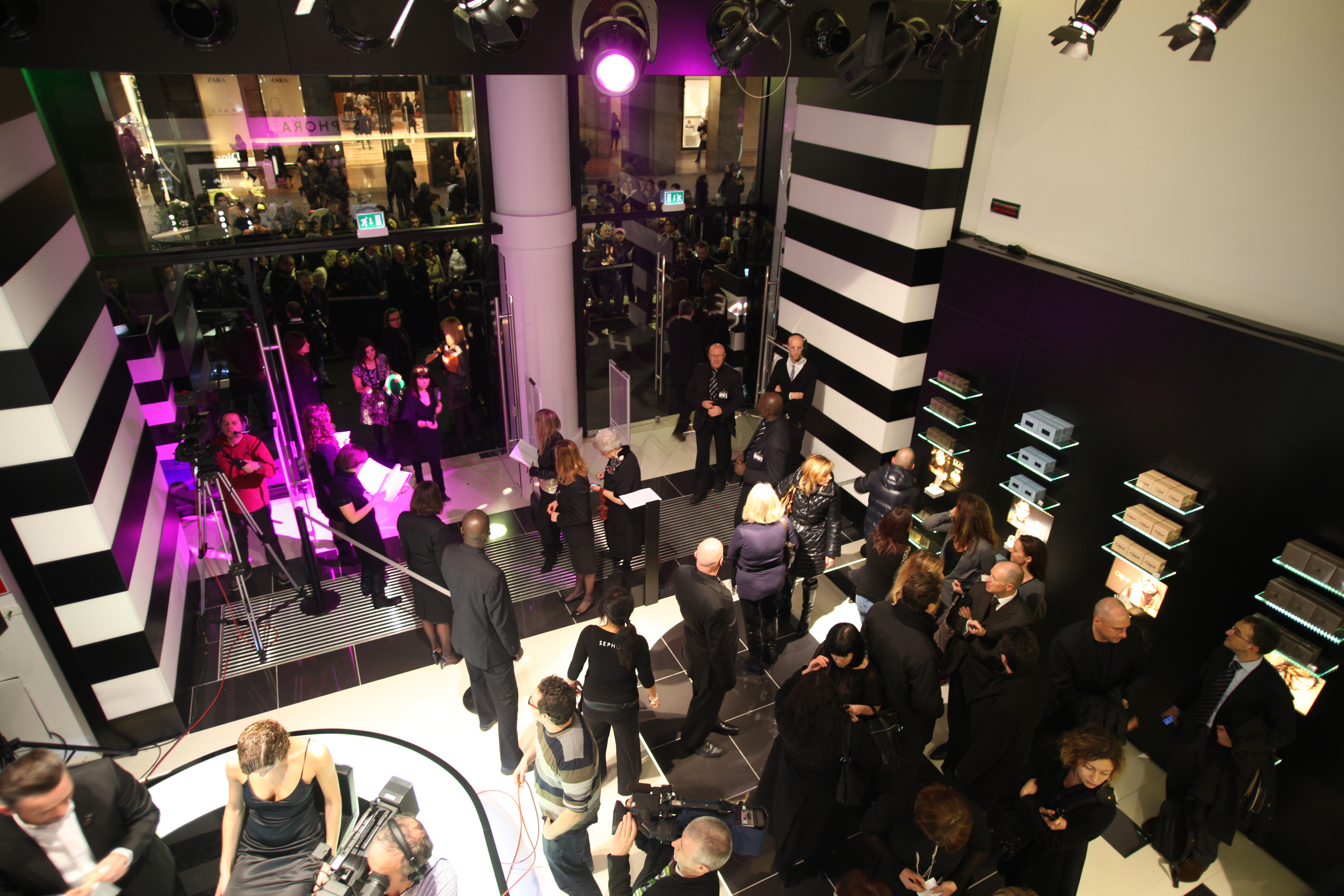
Milan Fashion Week

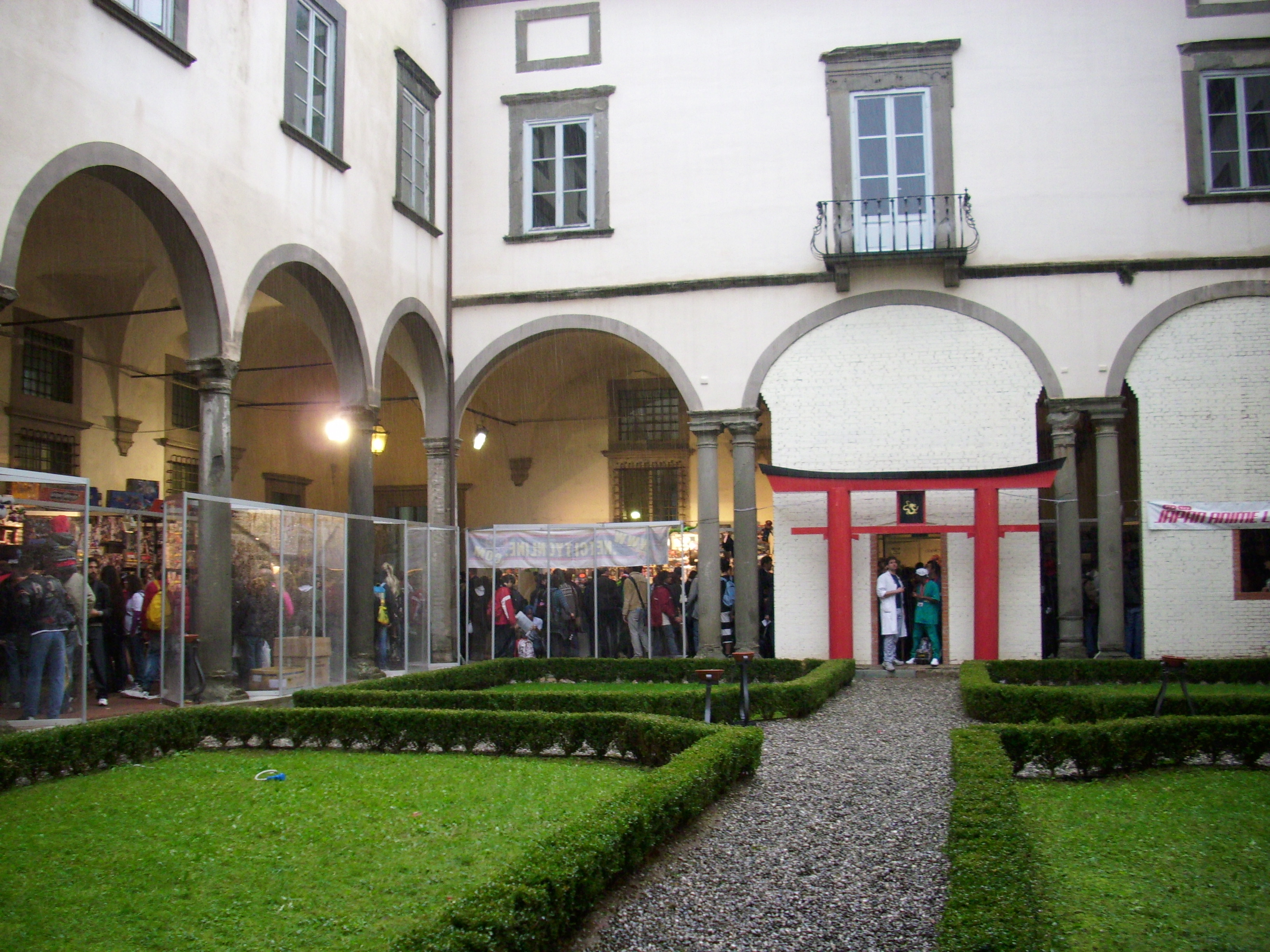
Lucca Comics & Games

Business tourism enlivens entrances to the country and constitutes a fundamental part of the sector. Businessmen who travel to Italy also take advantage of their stay to visit the country. This type includes those who use the accommodation facilities for business trips or to participate in events related to the production or marketing of various goods developed within the most disparate economic sectors. Businessmen who travel to Italy also take advantage of their stay to visit the country. By way of example, some events that attract businessmen to Italy are reported:

- the Fiera Milano is a trade fair and exhibition organiser headquartered in Milan. The firm is the most important trade fair organiser in Italy and one of the largest in the world.
- the Milan Motorcycle Show, one of the most important exhibitions in the world dedicated to motorcycles.
- the Venice Film Festival is the oldest film festival in the world and one of the "Big Three" alongside Cannes and Berlin.
- the Milan Furniture Fair is the most important showcase for the interiors and furnishings of the world.
- the Milan Fashion Week, held twice a year, is one of the most important worldwide
- the Genoa International Boat Show, one of the world's premier boat shows, held every year towards the end of September.
- the Euroflora, held in Genoa every five years, is the most important floral festival in Europe.
- the Terra Madre Salone del Gusto in Turin is an international gastronomy exhibition held every two years.
- the Turin International Book Fair is one of the largest book fairs in Europe.
- the Lucca Comics & Games is an annual comic book and gaming convention in Lucca, the most important exhibition in Europe and second in the world after the Comiket in Tokyo.
- the Vinitaly is an international wine competition and exposition that is held annually in April in Verona. VinItaly has been called the "most important convention of domestic and international wines" and the "largest wine show in the world".
- the Bologna Children's Book Fair is the leading professional fair for children's books in the world. It is held yearly for four days in March or April in Bologna
- the Milano Monza Open-Air Motor Show is an annual auto show held in June 2021 in Milan and Monza, Italy.
- the Concorso d'Eleganza Villa d'Este is a Concours d'Elegance event in Italy for classic and vintage cars. It takes place annually near the Villa d'Este hotel in Cernobbio, on the western shore of Lake Como. Since 2011, the event has taken place in the second half of May.
- the Genoa Science Festival is an annual science festival held in Genoa since 2003. In 2006, the year in which it had 250,000 visits, the Genoa Science Festival has been selected, the only Italian initiative, among the ten best events selected in 31 countries in the field of the promotion of culture scientific and technological at European level.
- the Pitti Immagine is a collection of fashion industry events in Italy. Pitti Immagine, is one of the world's most important platforms for men's clothing and accessory collections, and for launching new projects in men's fashion. It's held twice yearly in Florence, at the Fortezza da Basso. The first edition of Pitti Immagine was held in Florence in September 1972.
- the EuroChocolate is an annual chocolate festival that takes place in Perugia, the capital of the Umbria region in central Italy. The festival has been held since 1993, and is one of the largest chocolate festivals in Europe.
- the Giffoni Film Festival is one of the most well-known children's film festivals in the world. It takes place in a small Italian town of Giffoni Valle Piana in Campania, close to Salerno and Naples. The Giffoni Film Festival has had a great impact in the history of entertainment and culture, not only in Italy, and it has developed a high reputation internationally.
- the Ambrosetti Forum organized by The European House – Ambrosetti, a consulting firm – is an annual international economic conference held at Villa d'Este, in the Italian town of Cernobbio on the shores of Lake Como. Since its inception in 1975, the Forum has brought together heads of state, ministers, Nobel laureates and businesspeople to discuss current challenges to the world's economies and societies.

=== Food and wine tourism ===
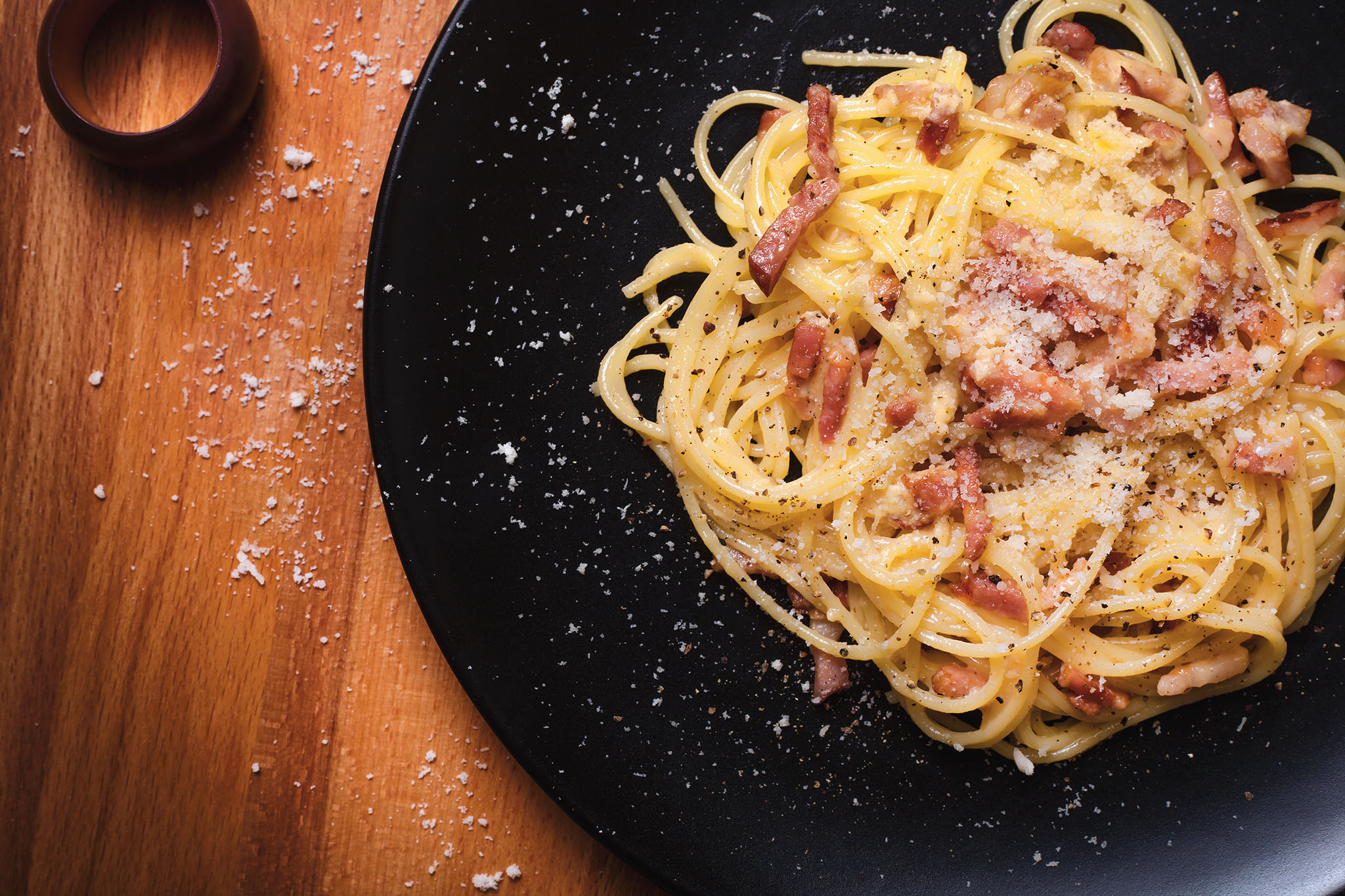
Spaghetti alla carbonara

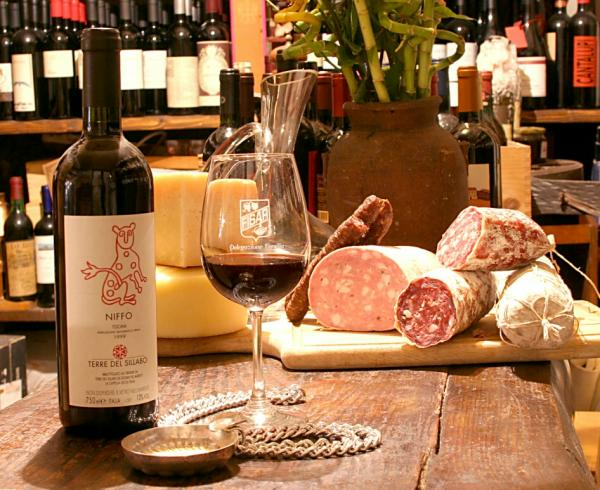
Italian wine and salumi

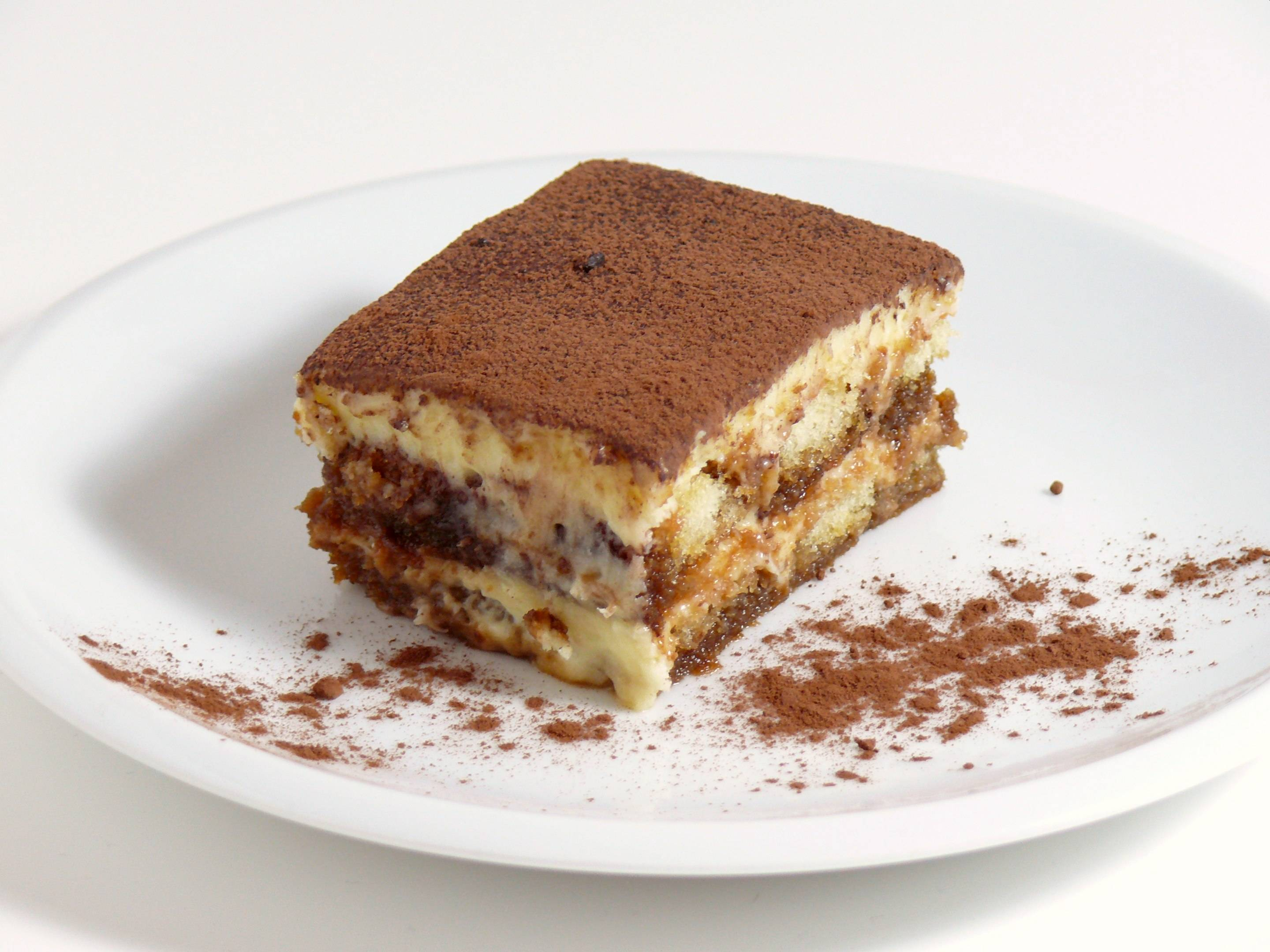
Tiramisu

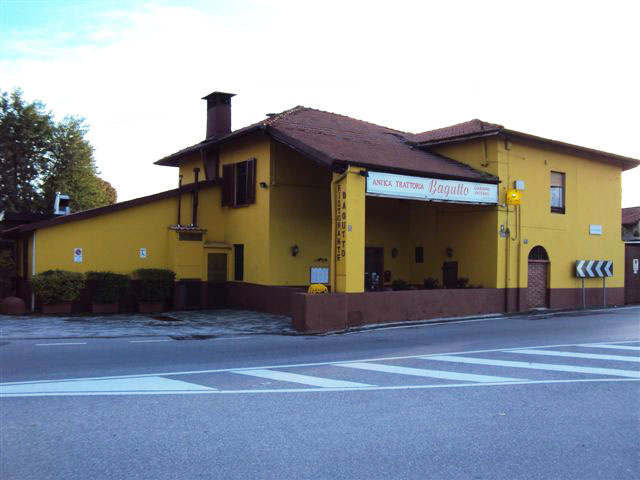
The Antica trattoria Bagutto in Milan, the oldest restaurant in Italy and the second in Europe

Italian cuisine is one of the best known and most appreciated gastronomies worldwide. Italian cuisine includes deeply rooted traditions common to the whole country, as well as all the regional gastronomies, different from each other, especially between the north and the south of Italy, which is in continuous exchange. Many dishes that were once regional have proliferated with variations throughout the country. Italian cuisine offers an abundance of taste, and is one of the most popular and copied around the world. Italy is the world's largest producer of wine, as well as the country with the widest variety of indigenous grapevine varieties in the world.

One of the main characteristics of Italian cuisine is its simplicity, with many dishes made up of few ingredients, and therefore Italian cooks often rely on the quality of the ingredients, rather than the complexity of preparation. The most popular dishes and recipes, over the centuries, have often been created by ordinary people more so than by chefs, which is why many Italian recipes are suitable for home and daily cooking, respecting regional specificities, privileging only raw materials and ingredients from the region of origin of the dish and preserving its seasonality.

Italian meal structure is typical of the European Mediterranean region and differs from North, Central, and Eastern European meal structure, though it still often consists of breakfast (colazione), lunch (pranzo), and supper (cena). However, much less emphasis is placed on breakfast, and breakfast itself is often skipped or involves lighter meal portions than are seen in non-Mediterranean Western countries. Late-morning and mid-afternoon snacks, called merenda (plural merende), are also often included in this meal structure.

The Mediterranean diet forms the basis of Italian cuisine, rich in pasta, fish, fruits and vegetables. Cheese, cold cuts and wine are central to Italian cuisine, and along with pizza and coffee (especially espresso) form part of Italian gastronomic culture. Desserts have a long tradition of merging local flavours such as citrus fruits, pistachio and almonds with sweet cheeses like mascarpone and ricotta or exotic tastes as cocoa, vanilla and cinnamon. Gelato, tiramisù and cassata are among the most famous examples of Italian desserts, cakes and patisserie.

Italian cuisine relies heavily on traditional products; the country has a large number of traditional specialities protected under EU law. From the 1950s onwards, a great variety of typical products of Italian cuisine have been recognized as PDO, PGI, TSG and GI by the Council of the European Union, to which they are added to the Indicazione geografica tipica (IGT), the regional Prodotti agroalimentari tradizionali (PAT) and the municipal Denominazione comunale d'origine (De.C.O.). In the oenological field, there are specific legal protections: the Denominazione di origine controllata (DOC) and the Denominazione di origine controllata e garantita (DOCG). Protected designation of origin (PDO) and Protected Geographical Indications (PGI) have also been established in olive growing.

Milan is home to the oldest restaurant in Italy and the second in Europe, the Antica trattoria Bagutto, which has existed since at least 1284. The cuisine is therefore often a reason for tourism in the peninsula, perhaps combined with one or more reasons previously described. There are countless food festivals and fairs spread throughout the area, from small agricultural centres to large metropolises. The hospitality sector is slowly updating by including cultural food and wine elements in its offer to tourists, both in traditional hotels and in specially created structures such as agritourisms. In 2018 the food and wine expenditure by foreign tourists amounted to 9.23 billion euros, with an average expenditure of 117 euros each.

=== Sports tourism ===
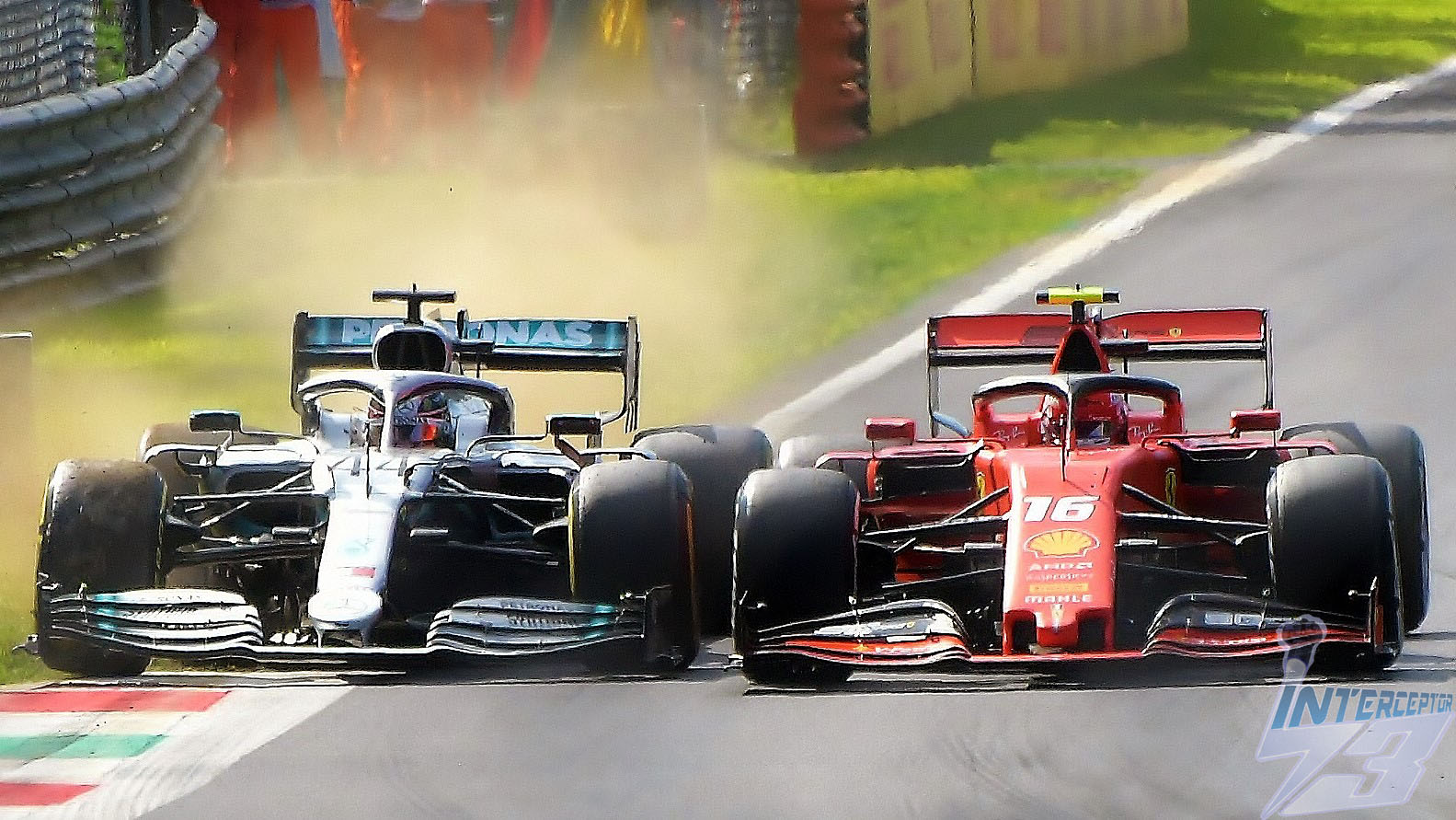
2019 Italian Grand Prix

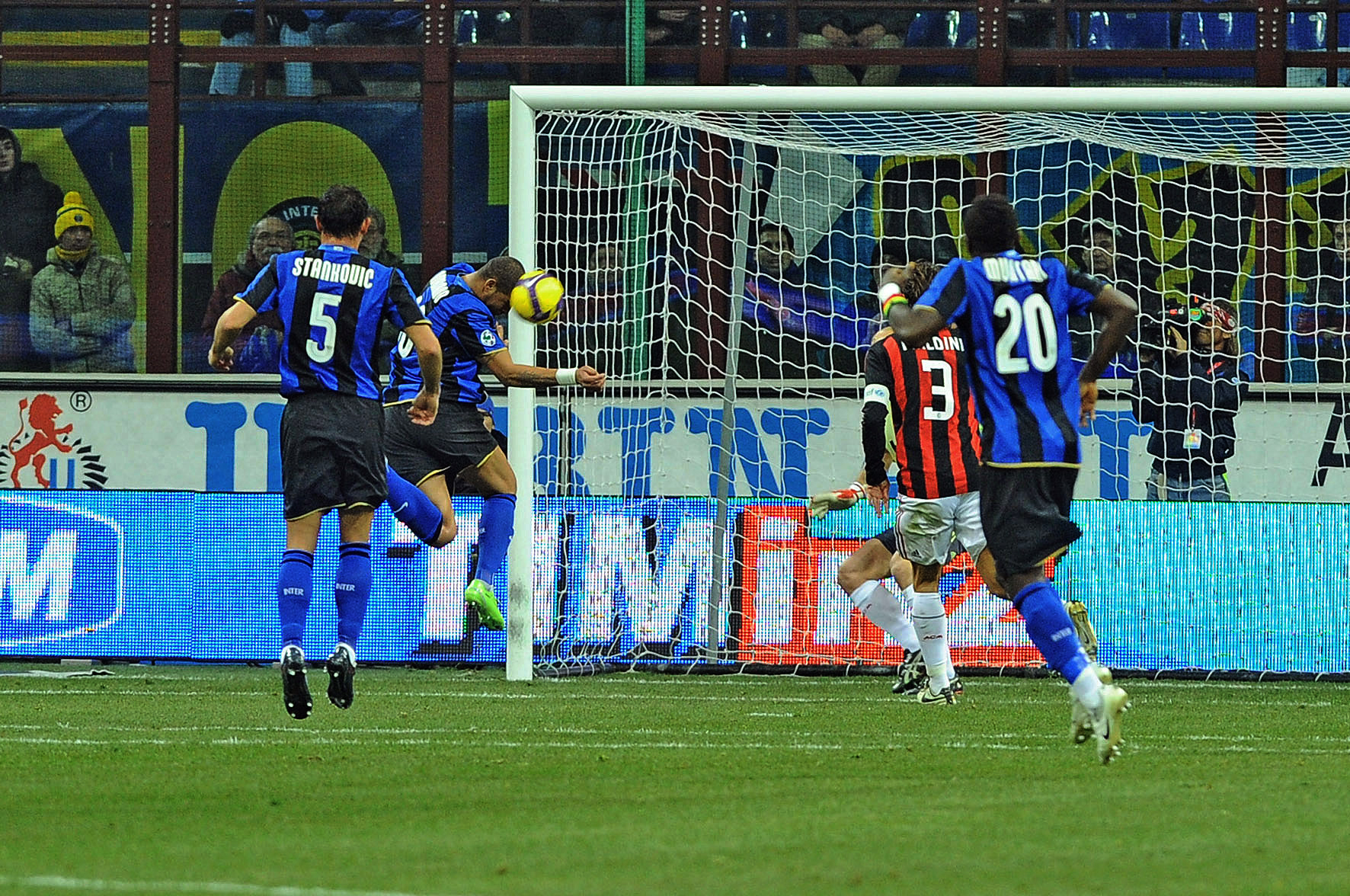
Derby della Madonnina (15 February 2009)

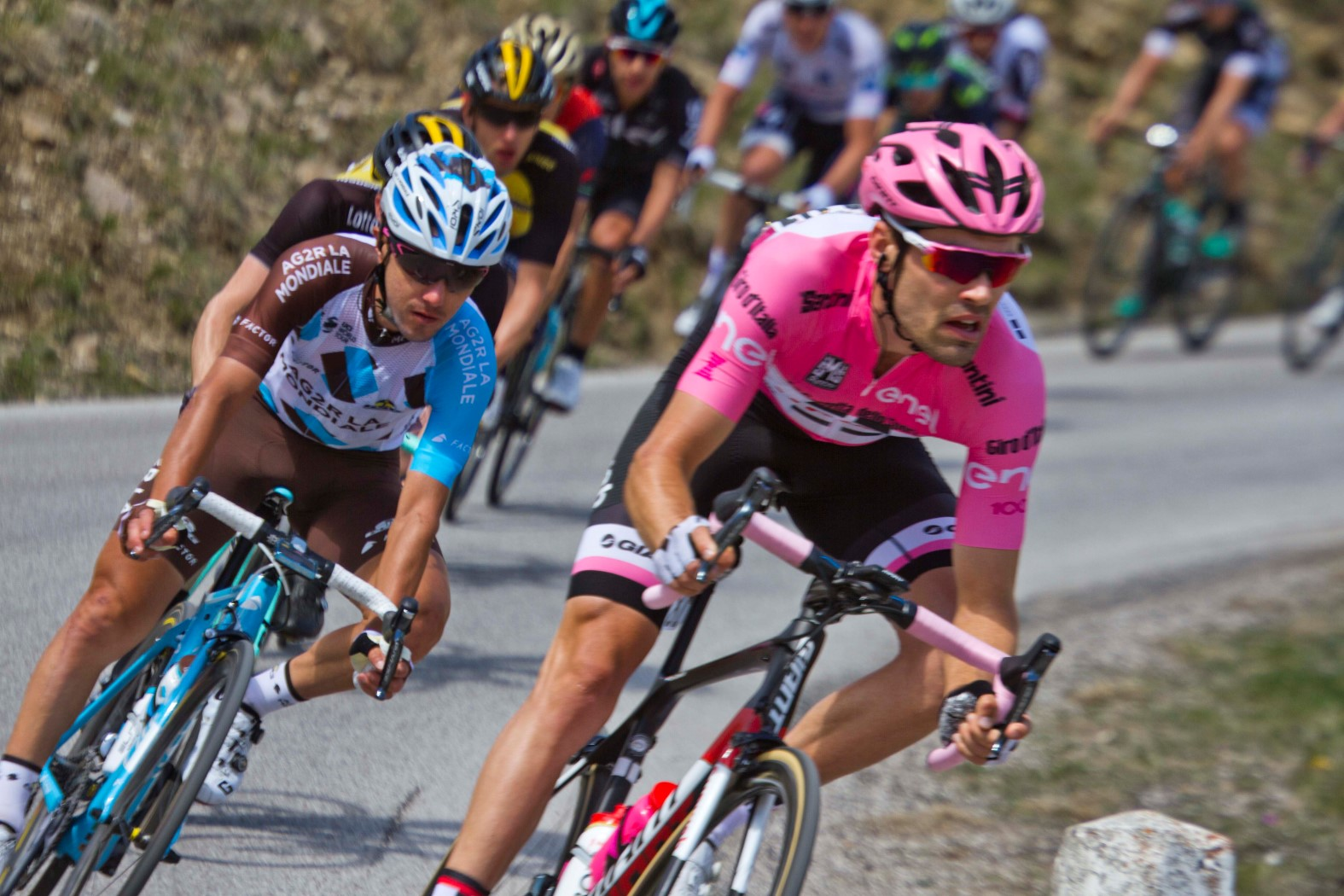
Starting in 1909, the Giro d'Italia is the Grands Tours' second oldest.

Sport in Italy has a long tradition. In several sports, both individual and team, Italy has good representation and many successes. Football is the most popular sport in Italy. Italy has won four FIFA World Cups championship (1934, 1938, 1982 and 2006), and is (along with Germany) currently the second most successful football team in World Cup history, after Brazil. Basketball, volleyball, and cycling are the next most popular/played sports, with Italy having a rich tradition in all three. Italy also has strong traditions in swimming, water polo, rugby union, tennis, athletics, fencing, and Formula One.

Tourism linked to sporting events is capable of attracting fans of various disciplines who, in several cases, then decide to stay to visit the country. In addition to events of a global nature, capable of attracting a large number of visitors for a longer period of time (among the major ones the 1960 Summer Olympics, the 2006 Winter Olympics and the 1990 FIFA World Cup), minor events also contribute to the development of this factor of tourism, such as individual international matches of various sports (for example the home matches of Italy during the Six Nations Championship or the matches of clubs of various sports involved in continental competitions) or tournaments of more local importance.

The Serie A is a professional league competition for football clubs located at the top of the Italian football league system and the winner is awarded the Scudetto and the Coppa Campioni d'Italia. Serie A is regarded as one of the best football leagues in the world and it is often depicted as the most tactical and defensively sound national league. Serie A was the world's strongest national league in 2020 according to IFFHS, and is ranked third among European leagues according to UEFA's league coefficient, behind La Liga and the Premier League and ahead of the Bundesliga and Ligue 1, which is based on the performance of Italian clubs in the Champions League and the Europa League during the previous five years. Serie A led the UEFA ranking from 1986 to 1988 and from 1990 to 1999.

The Italian Grand Prix is the fifth oldest national Grand Prix (after the French Grand Prix, the American Grand Prize, the Spanish Grand Prix and the Russian Grand Prix), having been held since 1921. In 2013 it became the most-held Grand Prix (the 2021 edition was the 91st). It is one of the two Grands Prix (along with the British) which has run as an event of the Formula One World Championship Grands Prix every season, continuously since the championship was introduced in 1950. Every Formula One Italian Grand Prix in the World Championship era has been held at Monza except in 1980, when it was held at Imola.

The Giro d'Italia is an annual multiple-stage bicycle race primarily held in Italy, while also starting in, or passing through, other countries. The first race was organized in 1909 to increase sales of the newspaper La Gazzetta dello Sport; and is still run by a subsidiary of that paper's owner. The Giro is a UCI World Tour event, which means that the teams that compete in the race are mostly UCI WorldTeams, with some additional teams invited as 'wild cards'. Starting in 1909, the Giro d'Italia is the Grands Tours' second oldest.

The Mille Miglia was an open-road, motorsport endurance race established in 1927 by the young Counts Francesco Mazzotti and Aymo Maggi, which took place in Italy twenty-four times from 1927 to 1957 (thirteen before World War II, eleven from 1947). From 1953 until 1957, the Mille Miglia was also a round of the World Sports Car Championship. Since 1977, the "Mille Miglia" has been reborn as a regularity race for classic and vintage cars. Participation is limited to cars, produced no later than 1957, which had attended (or were registered to) the original race. The route (Brescia–Rome round trip) is similar to that of the original race, maintaining the point of departure/arrival in Viale Venezia in Brescia.

=== Traditions tourism ===
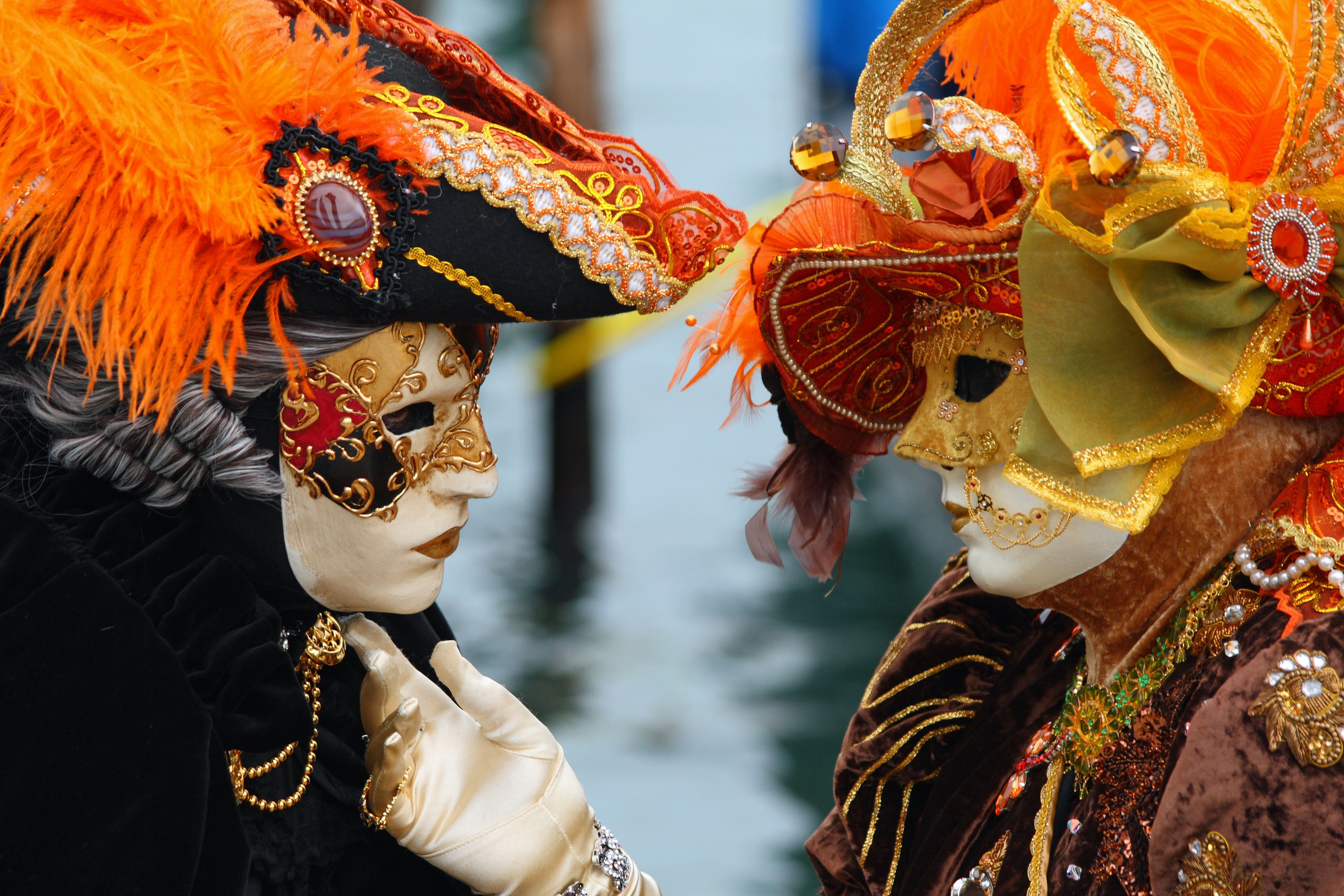
Carnival of Venice

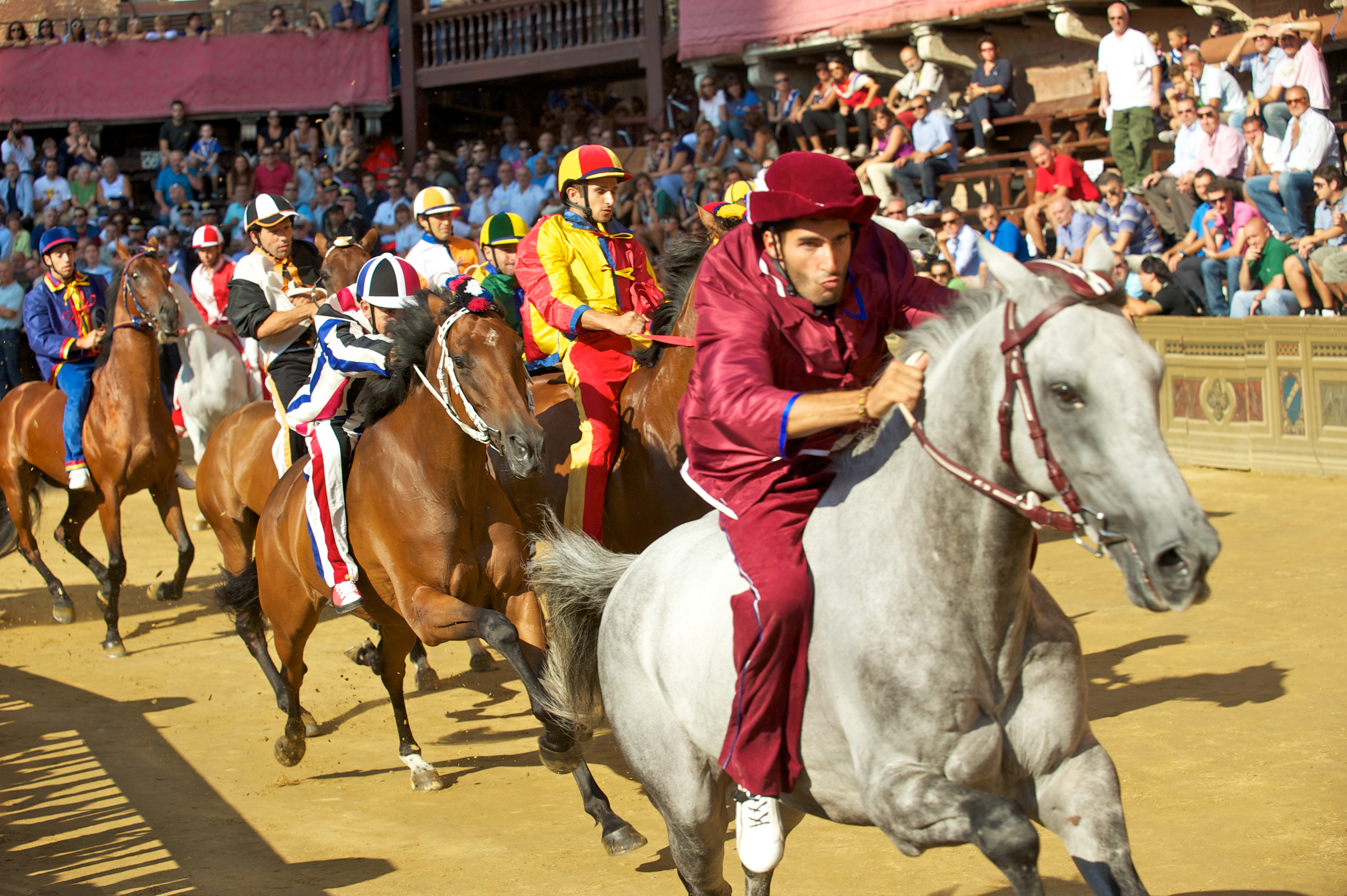
Palio di Siena

Traditions of Italy are some set of traditions, beliefs, values, and customs that belongs within the culture of Italian people. These traditions have influenced life in Italy for centuries, and are still practised in our modern days.

Notable traditional Italian events that attract tourists are the celebrations of the Epiphany in Rome, the Festival of Saint Agatha of Catania, the Scoppio del carro in Florence, the Fish Festival of Camogli, the Infiorate di Spello, the Festival of Saint Rosalia of Palermo, the Notte della Taranta of Salento, the Chilli Festival of Diamante, the Grape Festival of Marino, the Christmas markets of Trentino-Alto Adige, the Nativity play of Sassi di Matera, the Battle of the Oranges of Ivrea, Almond Blossom Festival of Agrigento, Tulip Festival of Castiglione del Lago, May Day of Assisi, Festival of the Knot of Love of Valeggio sul Mincio, Medieval Festivals of Brisighella, Prosciutto di San Daniele Festival of San Daniele del Friuli, Festa del Redentore of Venice, Macchina di Santa Rosa of Viterbo, Rice Fair of Isola della Scala, Barcolana regatta of Trieste, Regatta of the Historical Marine Republics and Nougat Festival of Cremona.

Carnival in Italy plays a very important role in Italian folklore, traditionally linked to regional masks, and is celebrated in many cities, some of which are known throughout the world for the special celebrations they organize for this occasion. The Carnival in Venice was first documented in 1296, with a proclamation by the Venetian Senate announcing a public festival the day before the start of Lent. Today, about 3 million people travel to Venice to take part in the famous Carnival. The Carnival of Viareggio is the second-most popular in Italy. The first Carnival of Viareggio parade was held in 1873. Every year, the Carnival of Viareggio attracts more than 500,000 spectators. The Carnival of Ivrea is famous for its "Battle of the Oranges" fought with fruit between the people on foot and the troops of the tyrant on carts, to remember the wars of the Middle Ages, allegory of struggle for freedom. It is the largest food fight in Italy and surrounding countries.

Traditional sports also attract tourists in Italy, such as the Palio, the name given in the country to an annual athletic contest, very often of a historical character, pitting the neighbourhoods of a town or the hamlets of a comune against each other. Typically, they are fought in costume and commemorate some event or tradition of the Middle Ages and thus often involve horse racing, archery, jousting, crossbow shooting, and similar medieval sports. The Palio di Siena is the only one that has been run without interruption since it started in the 1630s and is definitely the most famous all over the world, attracting tourists from every continent.

Another traditional Italian sport that attracts tourists is the Calcio Fiorentino (also referred to as calcio storico, "historic football"), an early form of football (soccer and rugby) that originated during the Middle Ages and is still played annually today in the Piazza Santa Croce in Florence. Other important Italian traditional competitions that attract tourists are the Palio di Asti, the Palio di Legnano, the Palio di Ferrara, the Giostra del Saracino and the Giostra della Quintana.

=== UNESCO World Heritage Sites tourism ===
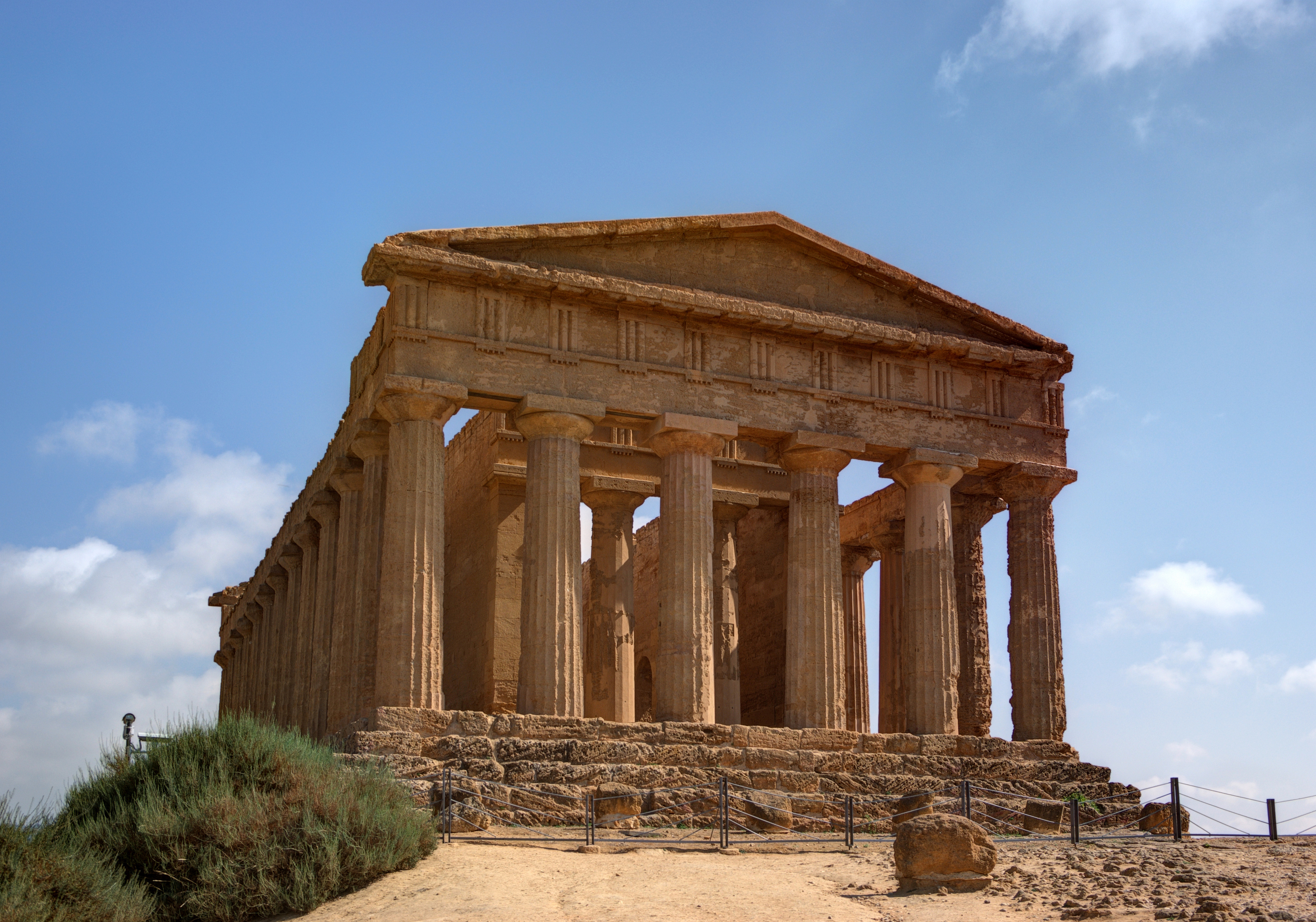
Temple of Concordia, Valle dei Templi, Sicily

Italy is the country with the highest concentration in the world of the UNESCO World Heritage Sites. As of 2021, Italy has a total of 58 inscribed sites, making it the country with the most World Heritage Sites just above China (56). Out of Italy's 58 heritage sites, 53 are cultural and 5 are natural. 50% of the tourists who visit the UNESCO heritage sites in Italy are foreigners, and of these, 75% are in Italy for a cultural holiday.

Among the most famous Italian UNESCO World Heritage Sites there are Sassi di Matera; Porto Venere, Palmaria, Tino, Tinetto and Cinque Terre; Val d'Orcia; Early Christian Monuments of Ravenna; Valle dei Templi; Alberobello; Etruscan Necropolises of Cerveteri and Tarquinia; Pompeii, Torre Annunziata and Herculaneum; Palmanova; Barumini nuraghes; Dolomites; Santa Maria delle Grazie and The Last Supper; Castel del Monte; Royal Palace of Caserta, Aqueduct of Vanvitelli and San Leucio Complex; Syracuse and Necropolis of Pantalica; Villa d'Este; Langhe-Roero and Montferrat; Aeolian Islands; Val di Noto; Amalfi Coast; Rhaetian Railway in the Albula/Bernina Landscapes; Aquileia; Duomo and the Leaning Tower of Pisa; Arab-Norman Palermo and the Cathedral Churches of Cefalù and Monreale; Residences of the Royal House of Savoy; Parco Nazionale del Cilento, Vallo di Diano e Alburni, Paestum, Velia and Certosa di Padula; Scrovegni Chapel.

=== Historical and artistic villages tourism ===
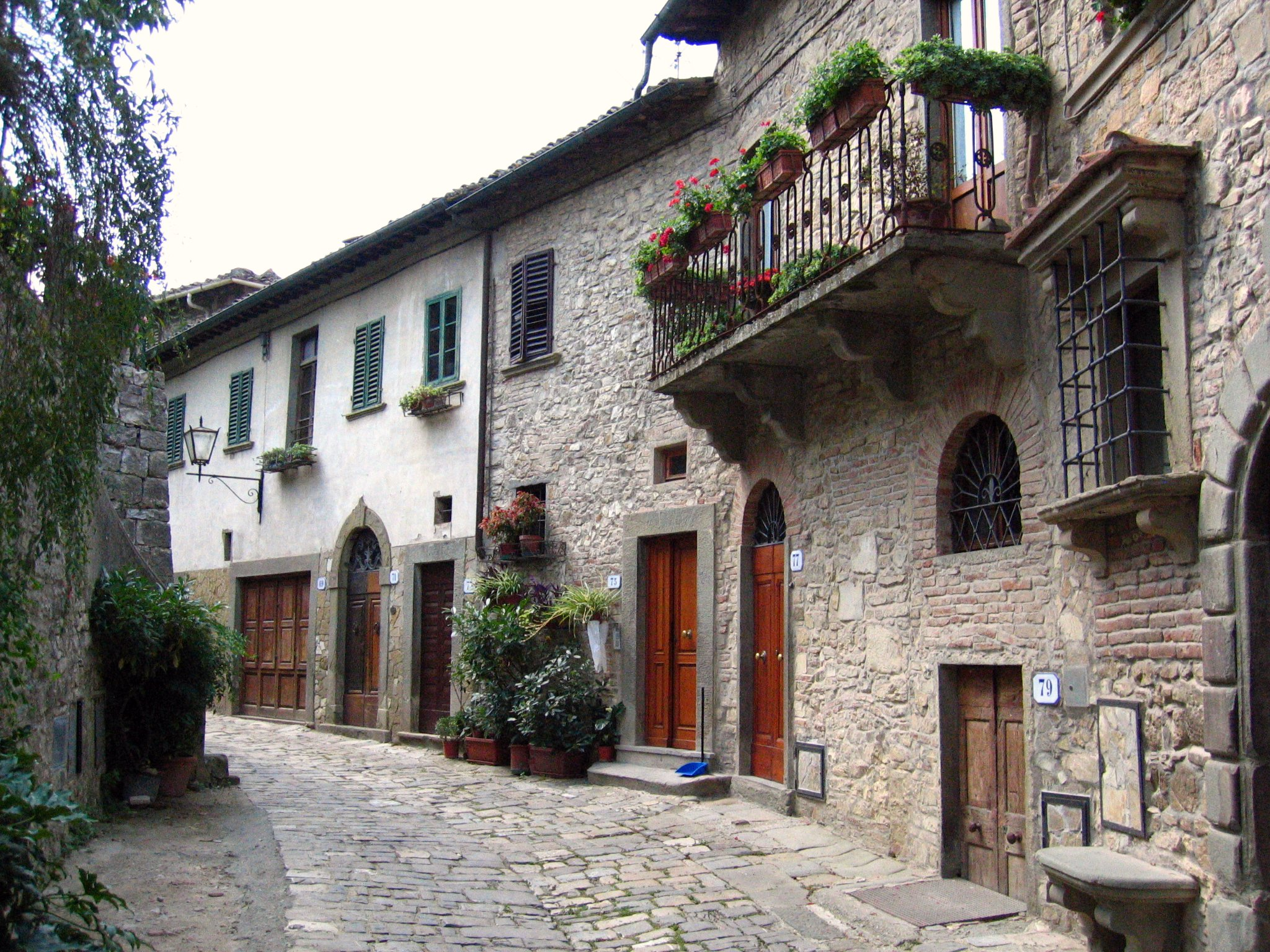
Montefioralle, Tuscany, is one of "The Most Beautiful Villages in Italy".

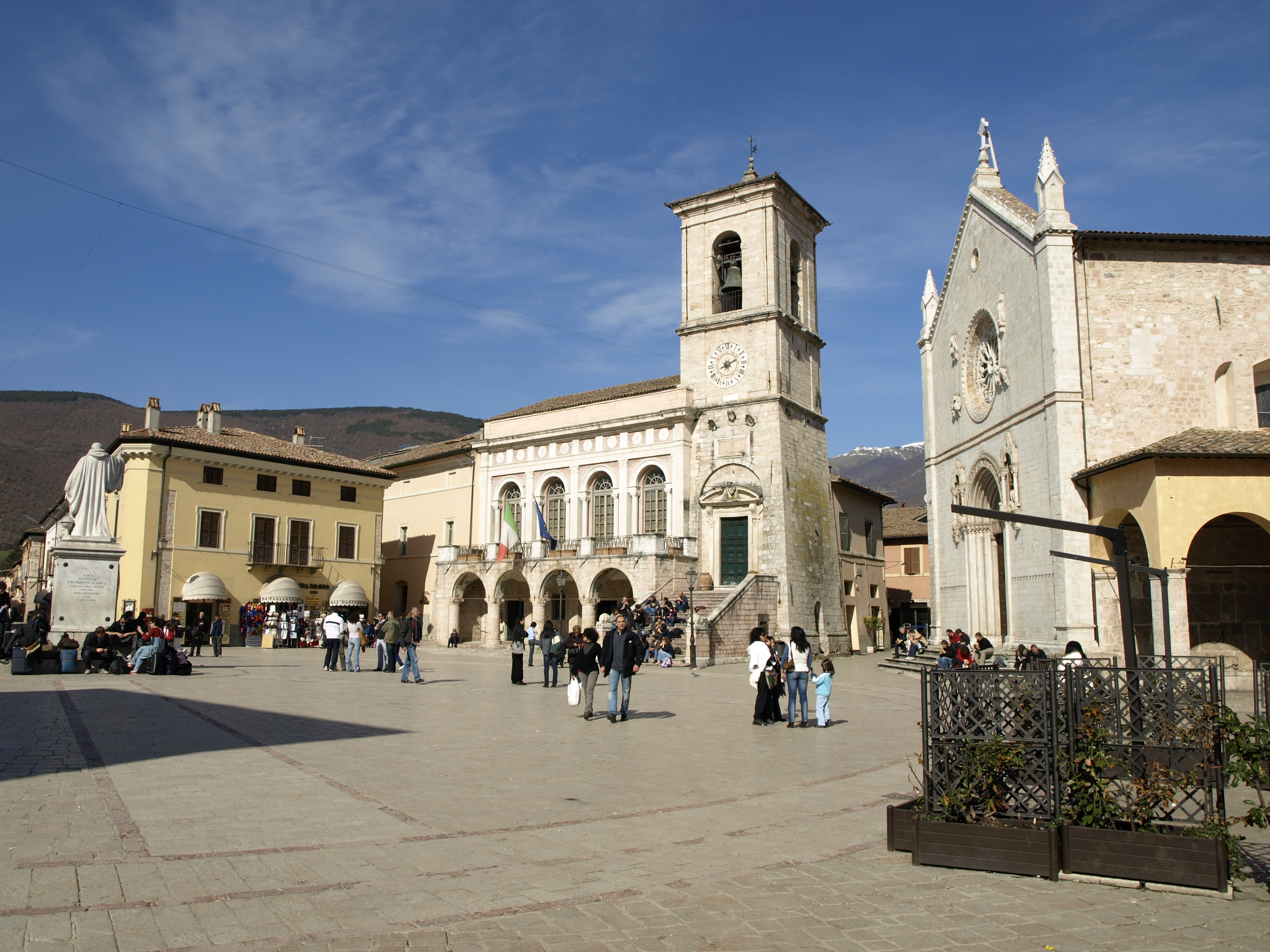
Norcia, Umbria, is one of "The Most Beautiful Villages in Italy".

The historical and artistic Italian villages are attracting an increasing number of tourists. A non-profit private association of small Italian towns of strong historical and artistic interest named I Borghi più belli d'Italia (English: The most beautiful Villages of Italy) and affiliated to the international association The Most Beautiful Villages in the World, was created in 2001 on the initiative of the Tourism Council of the National Association of Italian Municipalities with the aim of preserving and maintaining villages of quality heritage. Founded to contribute to safeguarding, conserving and revitalizing small villages and municipalities, but sometimes even individual hamlets, which, being outside the main tourist circuits, they risk, despite their great value, being forgotten with consequent degradation, depopulation and abandonment. Its motto is Il fascino dell'Italia nascosta ("The charm of hidden Italy").

As of November 2023, 361 villages in Italy have been listed in "The Most Beautiful Villages of Italy". This association organizes initiatives within the villages, such as festivals, exhibitions, fetes, conferences and concerts that highlight the cultural, historical, gastronomic and linguistic heritage, involving residents, schools, and local artists. The club promotes numerous initiatives on the international market. In 2016, the association signed a global agreement with ENIT, to promote tourism in the most beautiful villages in the world. In 2017, the club signed an agreement with Costa Cruises for the enhancement of some villages, which are offered to cruise passengers arriving in Italian ports aboard the operator's ships.

The Bandiera arancione is a tourist-environmental quality recognition conferred by the Touring Club Italiano (TCI) to small towns in the Italian hinterland (maximum 15,000 inhabitants) which stand out for their quality hospitality. The idea was born in 1998 in Sassello (in Liguria), from the need of the regional body to promote and enhance the hinterland. The TCI, therefore, developed an analysis model (called territorial analysis model or MAT) to identify the first deserving localities. Subsequently, the recognition was promoted on a national scale, identifying small places of excellence in each region. The group, as of June 2021, includes 252 villages. The project is the only Italian one included by the World Tourism Organization among the programs successfully implemented for the sustainable development of tourism worldwide.

=== Tourist railways ===
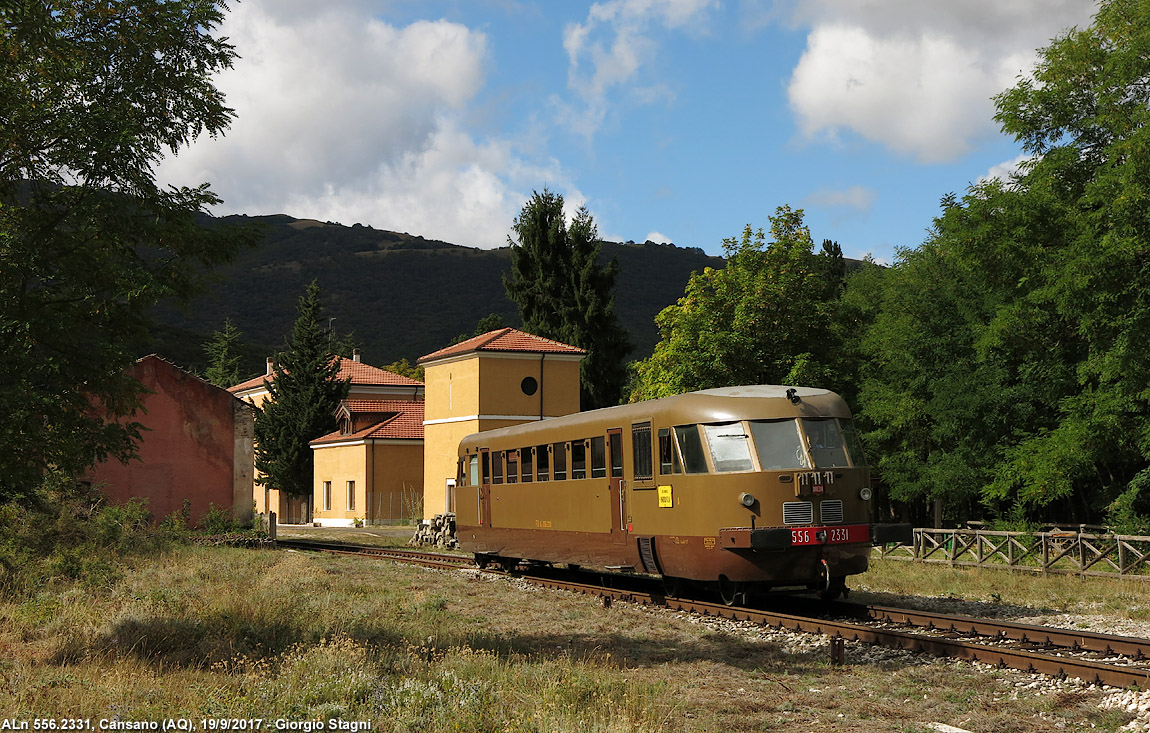
Historic train at the Cansano railway station, along the now tourist Sulmona-Castel di Sangro railway route

In Italy the heritage railway institute is recognized and protected by law no. 128 of 9 August 2017, which has as its objective the protection and valorisation of disused, suspended or abolished railway lines, of particular cultural, landscape and tourist value, including both railway routes and stations and the related works of art and appurtenances, on which, upon proposal of the regions to which they belong, tourism-type traffic management is applied (art. 2, paragraph 1). At the same time, the law identified a first list of 18 tourist railways, considered to be of particular value (art. 2, paragraph 2).

The list is periodically updated by decree of the Ministry of Infrastructure and Transport, in agreement with the Ministry of Economy and Finance and the Ministry of Culture, also taking into account the reports in the State-Regions Conference, a list which in 2022 reached 26 railway lines. According to article 1, law 128/2017 has as its purpose: "the protection and valorisation of railway sections of particular cultural, landscape and tourist value, which include railway routes, stations and related works of art and appurtenances, and of the historic and tourist rolling stock authorized to travel along them, as well as the regulation of the use of ferrocycles".

In July 2023, Ferrovie dello Stato established a new company, the "FS Treni Turistici Italiani" (English: FS Italian Tourist Trains), with the mission "to propose an offer of railway services expressly designed and calibrated for quality, sustainable tourism and attentive to rediscovering the riches of the Italian territory. Tourism that can experience the train journey as an integral moment of the holiday, an element of quality in the overall tourist experience". There are three service areas proposed: Luxury trains, Express and historic trains, and Regional trains.

=== Nightlife tourism ===
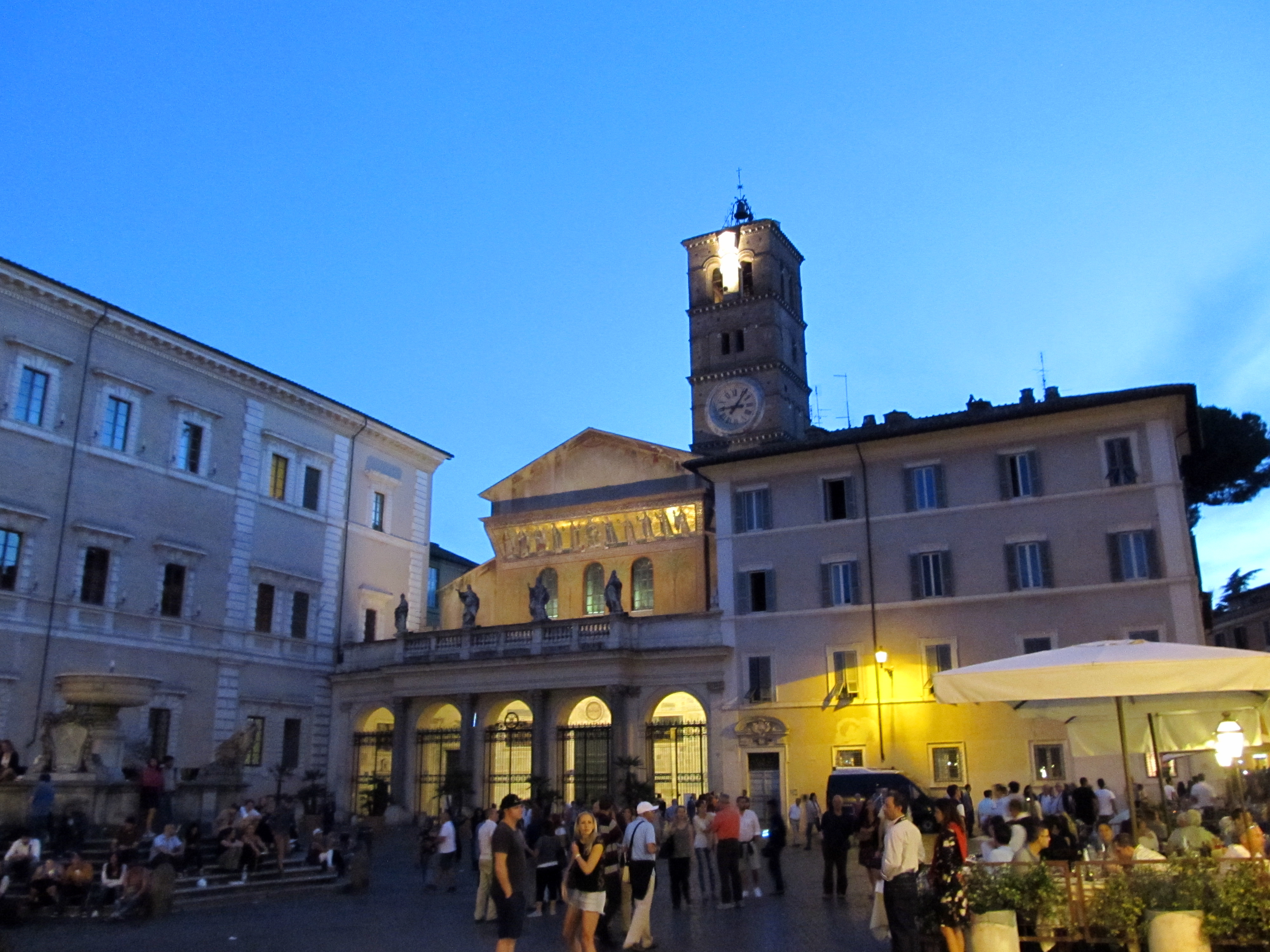
Trastevere nightlife, major tourist spot in Rome at night

The nightlife in Italy is attractive to both tourists and locals. Italy is known to have some of the best nightlife in the world. The best known Italian destinations for nightlife are:

- Milan (Lombardy), in particular Navigli, Brera, Isola, Porta Romana, Lambrate, Idroscalo, Corso Como, Corso Sempione and Colonne di San Lorenzo;
- Florence (Tuscany), in particular, the neighbourhoods of Oltrarno, Santo Spirito and Santa Croce;
- Rome (Lazio), in particular, the neighbourhoods of Trastevere, Pigneto, San Lorenzo and Ostiense;
- Venice (Veneto), in particular, the neighbourhoods of Erbaria, Fondamenta Misericordia and Santa Margherita;
- Salento (Apulia), in particular Gallipoli, Otranto and Lecce;
- Riviera of Romagna (Emilia-Romagna), in particular Riccione, Rimini and Milano Marittima;
- Jesolo (Veneto);
- Riviera del Corallo (Sardinia), in particular Alghero;
- Ischia (Campania);
- Coast of the Gods (Calabria), in particular Tropea, Capo Vaticano and Scilla.

=== LGBT tourism ===
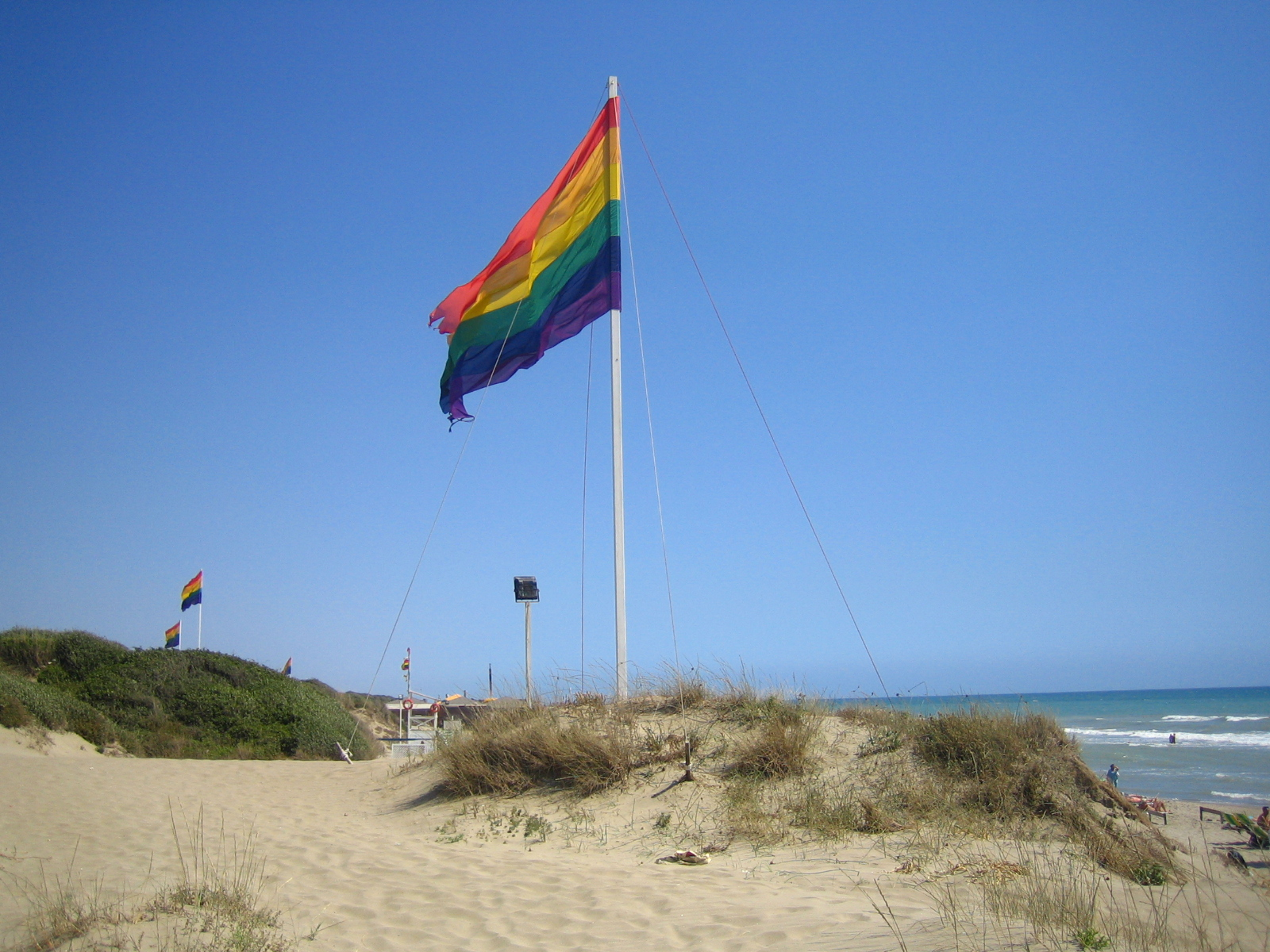
The rainbow flag flies in Capocotta, Ostia (Rome), a gay-friendly beach on the Italian Mediterranean Sea.

Italy represented one of the main homosexual male tourist destinations between the end of the 19th century and the beginning of the 20th century. In fact, in Italy there were no anti-homosexual laws, which were widespread in the countries of Northern Europe, such as the German paragraph 175 or the sentences suffered by Oscar Wilde in the United Kingdom. Places such as Capri, Taormina, Florence, Venice, Rome and Naples were the favourite places of homosexual tourism of the time.

This type of tourism disappeared in Italy in the 1950s due to changed political and social conditions, which favoured other types of tourism, such as "family" tourism. As a consequence, other Mediterranean cities (such as Mykonos, Ibiza and Sitges) took the place of the Italian ones for LGBT tourism.

Today LGBT tourism in Italy is mainly an urban phenomenon, such as in Milan and Rome due to the high variety of discos, pubs, bars, cruising, saunas, B&B, restaurants, which meet all needs. of the nightlife. In summer, however, the first Italian gay resort is Gallipoli which, with bars, discos, B&B and beaches, attracts people from all over Italy and abroad, taking away the primacy of Versilia. The naturist beaches of Spiaggia D'Ayala, Campomarino di Maruggio, Torre Guaceto and Brindisi attract LGBT crowds from all over the world.

=== Luxury tourism ===
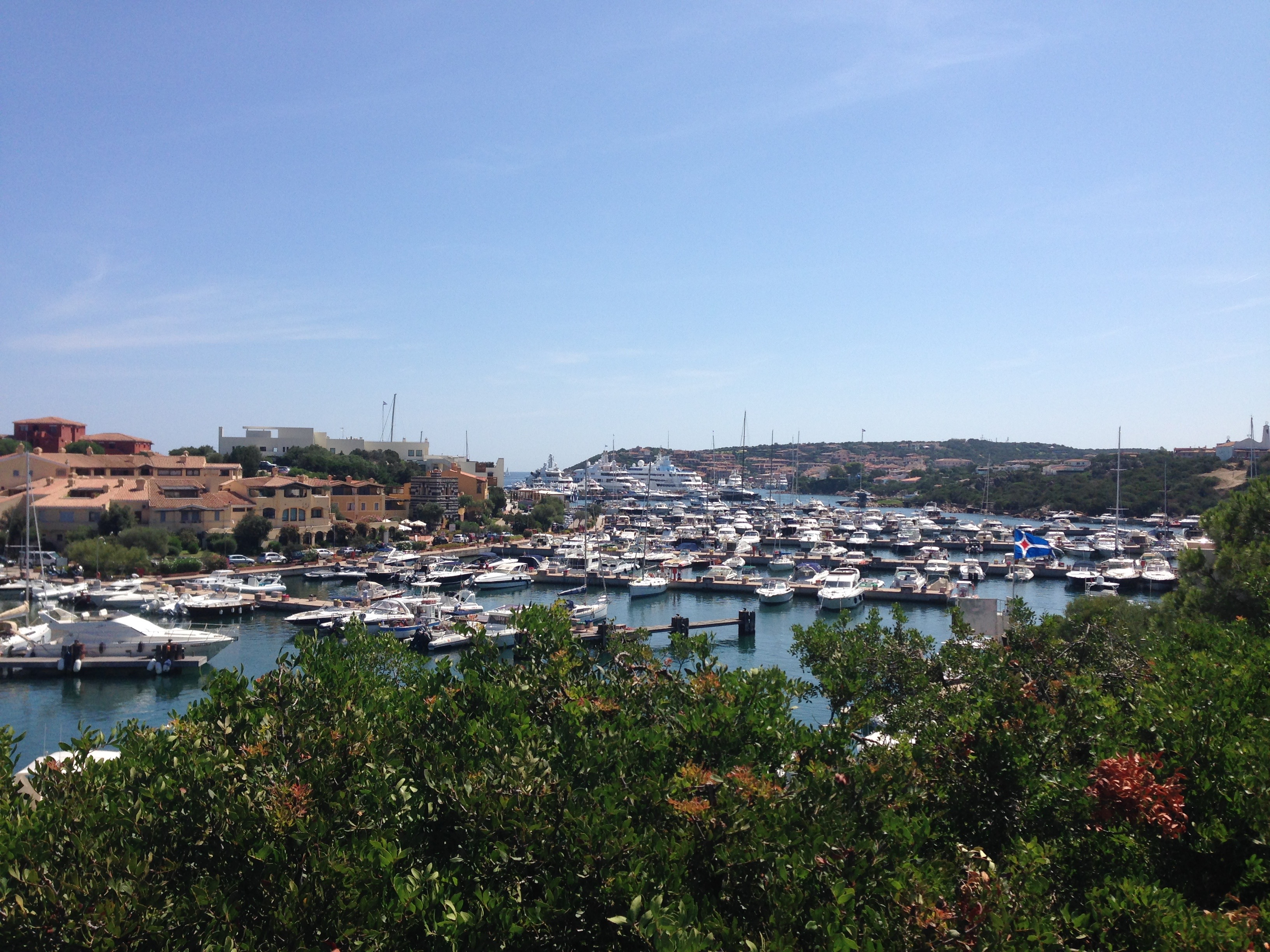
Porto Cervo, Costa Smeralda, Sardinia, in summer

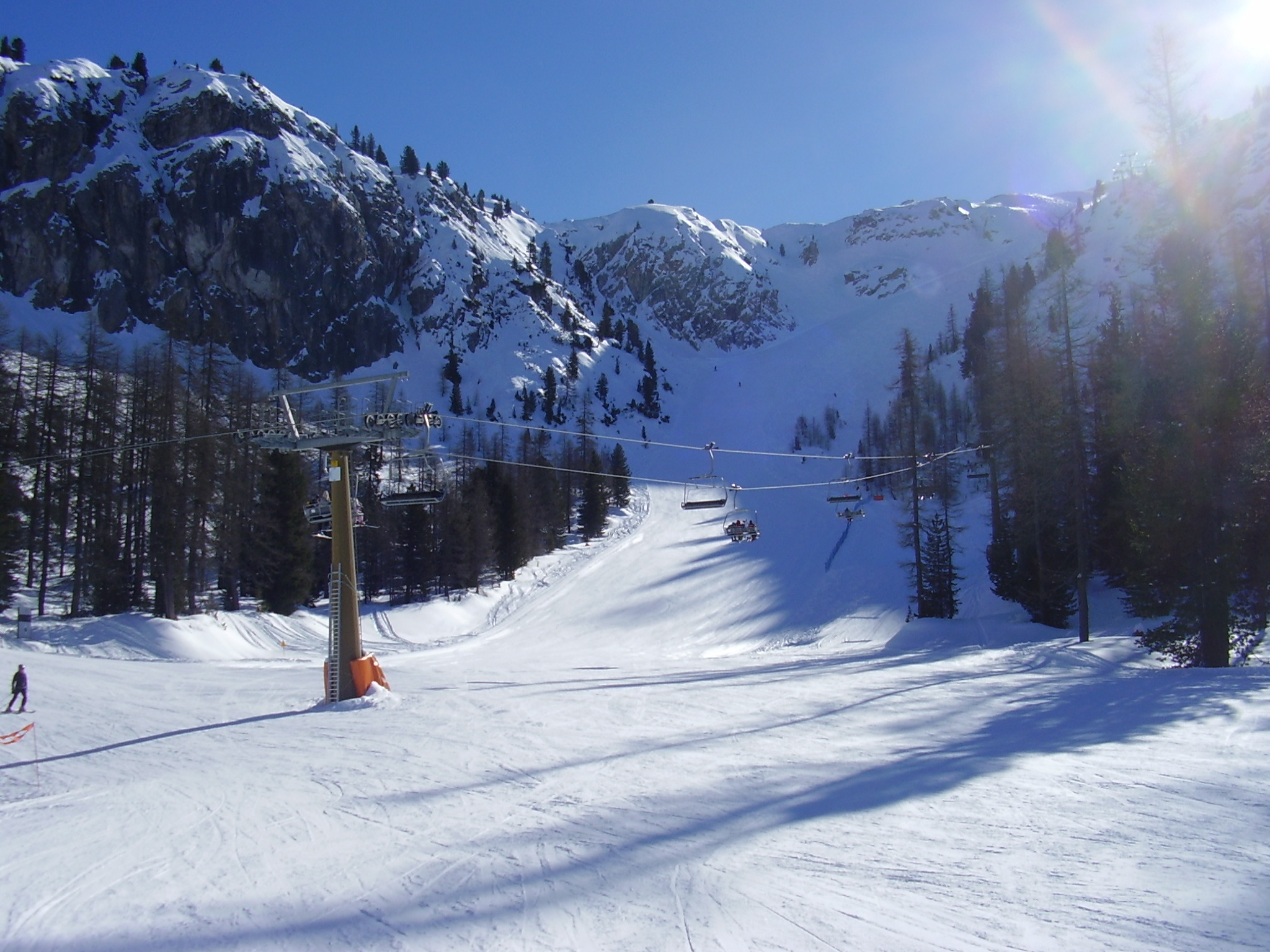
Cortina d'Ampezzo, Veneto, in winter

Luxury tourism in Italy is highly developed, corresponding to €25 billion (in particular €2 billion for catering and €14 billion for visits, excursions and shopping), a figure that increases, also considering the related activities and the indirect expenses of luxury tourists, to €60 billion, which corresponds to 3% of Italy's GDP.

The companies operating in the luxury tourism sector in Italy are 1% of the accommodation businesses present in the country, corresponding to approximately 3% of the nights spent in Italian accommodation facilities, but generate 25% of the total expenditure of tourists who choose Italy as their destination, and 15% of the total turnover of accommodation facilities. These data can be explained by considering some characteristics of luxury tourism where these tourists who travel to Italy spend nine times more than the average, and the most expensive hotels employ twice as many employees as an average quality hotel.

Regarding luxury tourism, Italy ranks 1st in the world for artistic-cultural tourism and food and wine tourism, 2nd place for mountain tourism and tourism in large cities and 4th place for seaside tourism. As for the most popular destinations for luxury tourists in Italy, in mountain tourism are the Dolomites, especially Cortina d'Ampezzo and Madonna di Campiglio, Trentino-Alto Adige, especially Selva di Val Gardena, and Aosta Valley, in particular Courmayeur, for lake tourism Lake Como and Lake Garda, in particular Gardone Riviera, while for seaside tourism the Cinque Terre and Portofino, the Amalfi Coast, in particular Amalfi, Ravello and Positano, the island of Capri, the Costa Smeralda (especially Porto Cervo), Porto Ercole, Forte dei Marmi, Santa Margherita Ligure and Taormina. As for the Italian cities, the most visited by luxury tourists are Venice, Milan, Florence and Rome.

In particular, Costa Smeralda is the most expensive location in Europe. House prices reach up to €300,000 ($392,200) per square metre. Development of the Costa Smeralda started in 1961 and was financed by a consortium of companies led by Prince Karim Aga Khan. Spiaggia del Principe, one of the beaches along the Costa Smeralda, was named after this Ishmaelite prince.

=== Amusement and theme park tourism ===
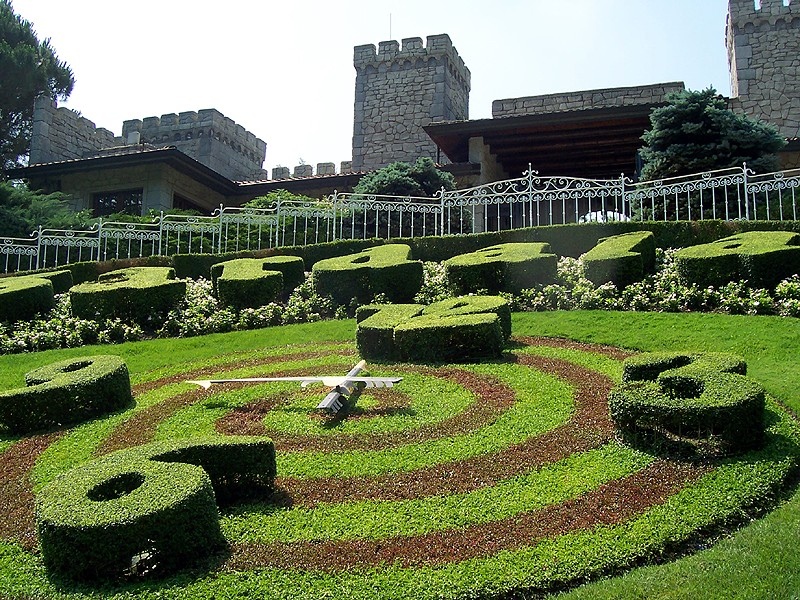
The entrance to Gardaland seen from inside the amusement park

The most visited amusement park in Italy is Gardaland, with 3 million visitors per year (2019). Located in Castelnuovo del Garda, is adjacent to Lake Garda. The entire complex covers an area of 445,000 m^{2} (4,789,940 sq ft), while the theme park alone measures 200,000 m^{2} (2,152,782 sq ft). Gardaland is the eighth in Europe by the number of amusement park visitors (2019). In June 2005 Gardaland ranked fifth in the Forbes ranking of the top ten best amusement parks in the world.

The second most visited Italian amusement park is Mirabilandia, with 2 million annual visitors (2019). Located in Savio, a frazione of Ravenna, with a total area of 850,000 m^{2} (9,149,324 sq ft) it is the biggest amusement park in Italy. Other popular Italian amusement/theme parks are Cinecittà World in Rome, Zoomarine in Torvaianica, Cavallino Matto in Marina di Castagneto Carducci, Italia in miniatura in Rimini, Cowboyland in Voghera, Pombia Safari Park in Pombia, Aquarium of Genoa, Parco Natura Viva in Bussolengo, Zoom Torino in Cumiana and Le Cornelle in Valbrembo.

=== Roots tourism ===
Map of the Italian diaspora in the world

Italy has experienced a conspicuous emigration to foreign countries following Italian unification, World War I and World War II. By 1980, it was estimated that about 25,000,000 Italians were residing outside Italy. It is estimated that the number of their descendants, who are called "oriundi", is about 80 million worldwide.

This includes about 60% of Argentina's population (Italian Argentines), 1/3 of Uruguayans (Italian Uruguayans), 15% of Brazilians (Italian Brazilians, the largest Italian community outside Italy), more than 5 million Venezuelans (Italian Venezuelans), and people in other parts of Europe (e.g. Italians in Germany, Italians in France and Italians in the United Kingdom), the Americas (such as Italian Americans, Italian Canadians, Italian Colombians and Italians in Paraguay, among others), Australasia (Italian Australians and Italian New Zealanders), and to a lesser extent in the Middle East.

This phenomenon has led to an important flow of tourists of Italian origin who visit the country and discover their roots. The trip to Italy of these tourists is mainly about knowing the places, the language, the cuisine and the people to which their ancestors belonged. In 2018, about 10 million tourists of Italian origin went to the country to rediscover their roots.

=== Student programmes tourism ===
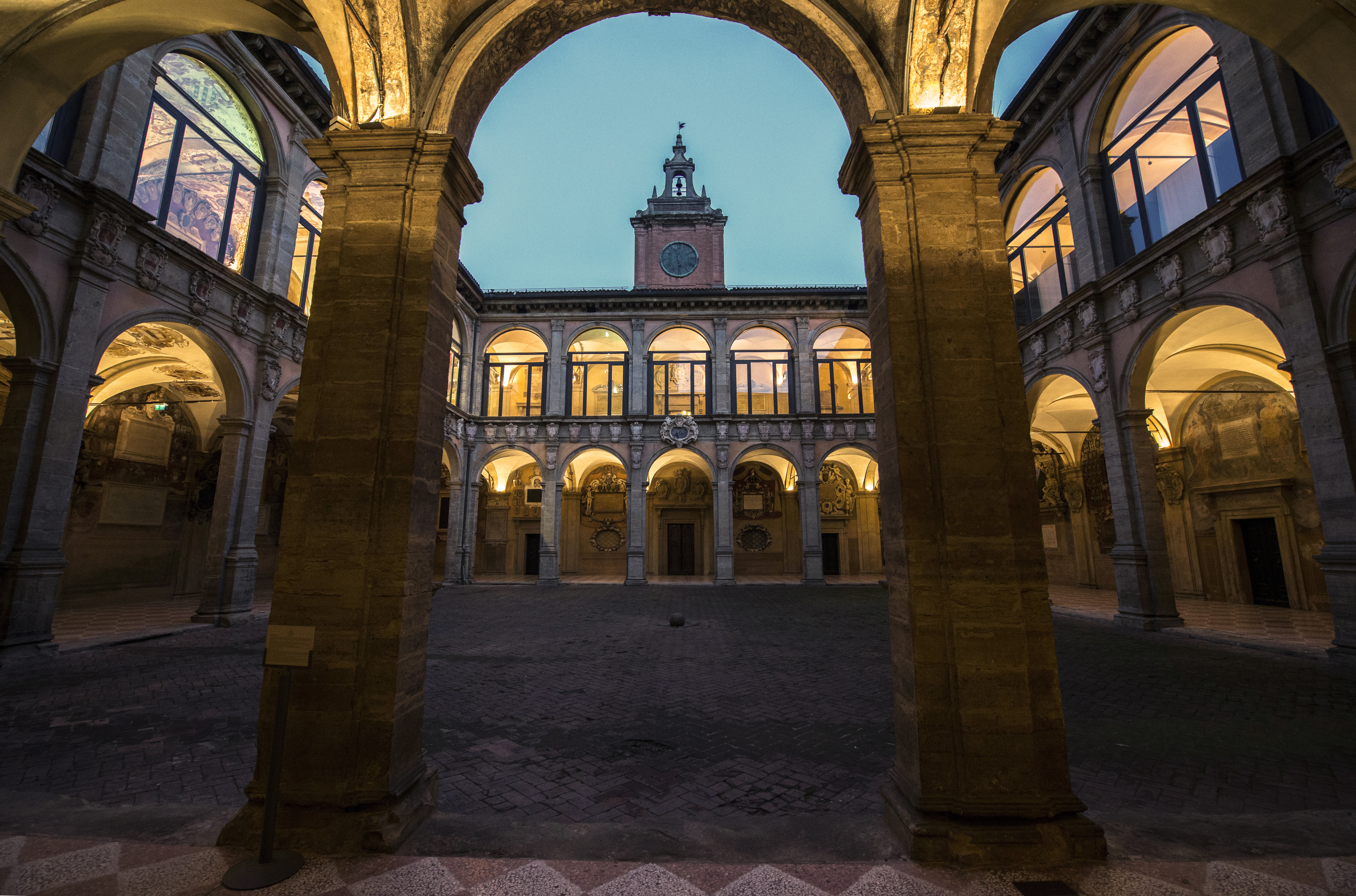
Bologna University, established in AD 1088, is the world's oldest university in continuous operation.

A student exchange programme is a programme in which students from a secondary school (high school) or university study abroad at one of their institution's partner institutions. Italy is one of the destinations of secondary school students and university students participating in exchange programmes. Students who go to study in Italy also take advantage of their stay to visit the country.

Italy is one of the main destinations of the Erasmus Programme, fifth in Europe after Spain, Germany, France and the United Kingdom respectively. The Erasmus Programme is a European Union (EU) student exchange programme established in 1987. Erasmus+, or Erasmus Plus, is the new programme combining all the EU's current schemes for education, training, youth and sport, which was started in January 2014.

The first five Italian universities that have hosted the largest number of students of the Erasmus Programme are, respectively, the University of Bologna, the Sapienza University of Rome, the University of Florence, the Polytechnic University of Milan and the University of Padua. In particular, the University of Bologna, founded in 1088, is the oldest university in continuous operation in the world, and the first university in the sense of a higher-learning and degree-awarding institute, as the word universitas was coined at its foundation. Also, University of Padua, founded in 1222, and University of Naples Federico II, founded in 1224, are the oldest universities in Europe. 33 Italian universities were ranked among the world's top 500 in 2019, the third-largest number in Europe after the United Kingdom and Germany.

== Regions ==
=== Northwest Italy ===
Regions: Piedmont, Liguria, Lombardy and Aosta Valley

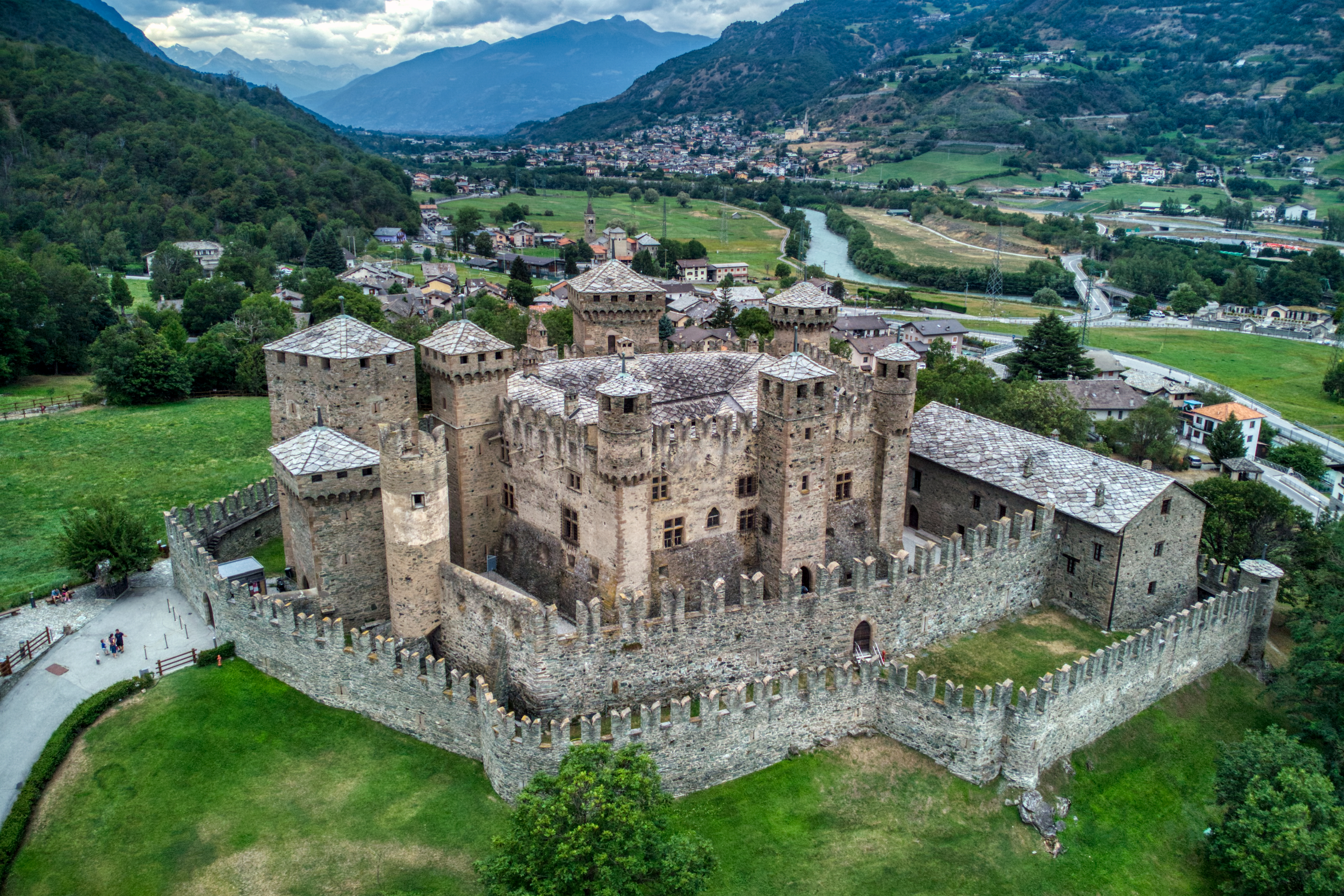
Fénis Castle, 13th century (Aosta Valley)

Home of the Italian Riviera, including Portofino, Sanremo, and of Cinque Terre. There are many historic cities in this part of Italy: Turin, the manufacturing capital of Italy, Milan, the business and fashion capital of the country and the important port of Genoa are the most popular tourist destinations of the area.

Other cities like Aosta, Bergamo, Brescia, Como and Mantua have a rich cultural heritage, which shares the region's visitors with beautiful landscapes such as the lakes Garda (with Grottoes of Catullus and Gardone Riviera), Como (with Bellagio and Varenna) and Maggiore (with Borromean Islands and Angera). There are also important ski resorts like Sestriere, Courmayeur, Breuil-Cervinia, Livigno and Bormio.

=== Northeast Italy ===
Regions: Emilia-Romagna, Friuli-Venezia Giulia, Trentino-Alto Adige/Südtirol and Veneto

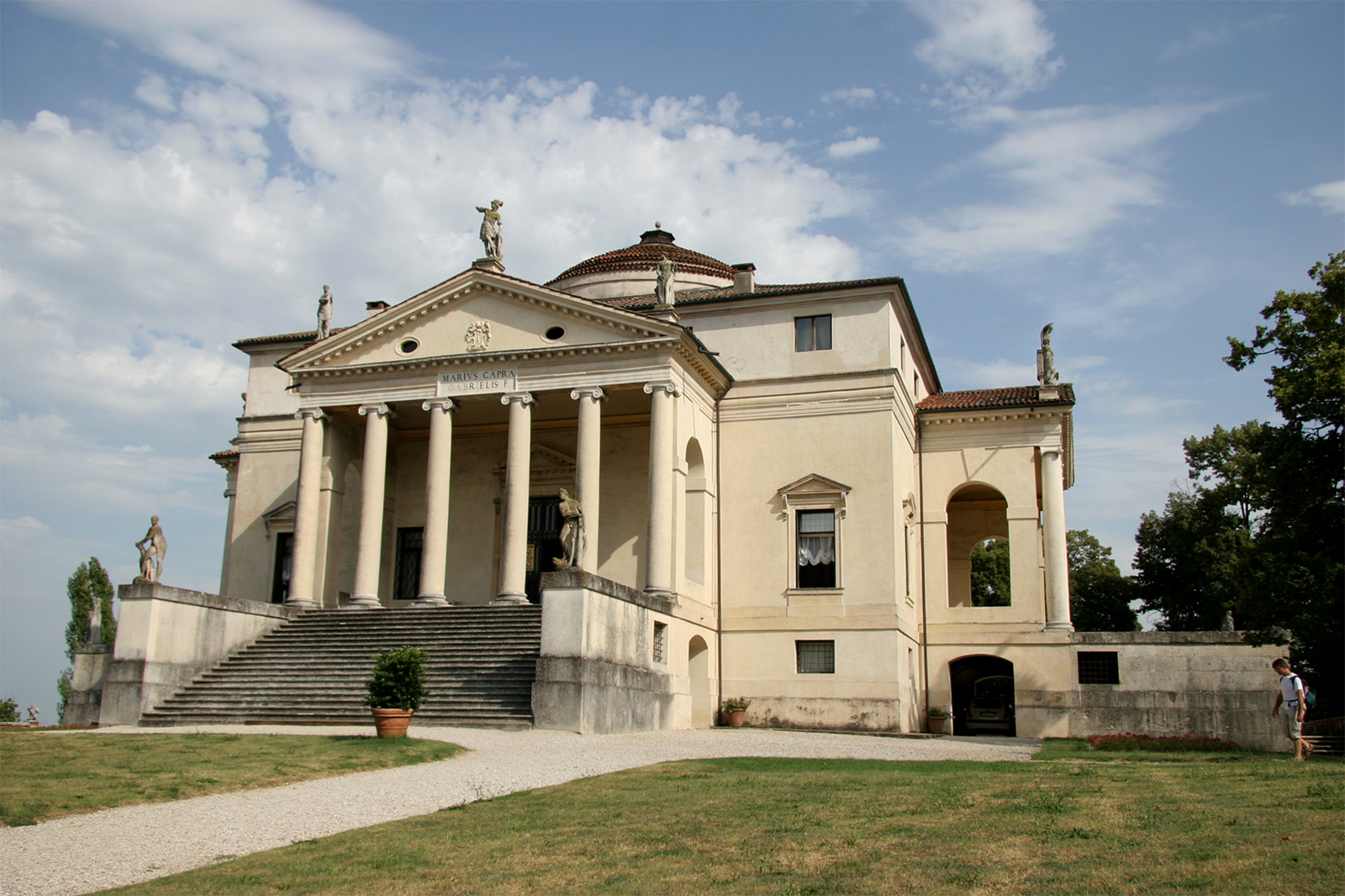
Villa Capra "La Rotonda" in Vicenza, one of Palladio's most influential designs

This part of Italy boasts several important tourist attractions, including the canal-filled city of Venice and the cities of Verona, Vicenza, Padua, Trento, Bolzano, Cremona, Bologna, Ferrara, Parma, Ravenna, Cesena, Rimini and Trieste.

There are several mountain ranges, such as the Dolomites, the Carnic, and the Julian Alps and first-class ski resorts, including Cortina d'Ampezzo and Madonna di Campiglio. These four regions are considered to offer much entertainment and enjoyment for their visitors. The area is considered to have unique cuisine, including wines and dishes such as Prosecco and Tiramisu in Veneto and Cotechino, Ragu and Parma ham in Emilia-Romagna, prosciutto di San Daniele, and D.O.C. wines in Valpolicella, Lake Garda, Valdobbiadene, Trentino and Friuli-Venezia Giulia.

=== Central Italy ===
Regions: Lazio, Marche, Tuscany and Umbria

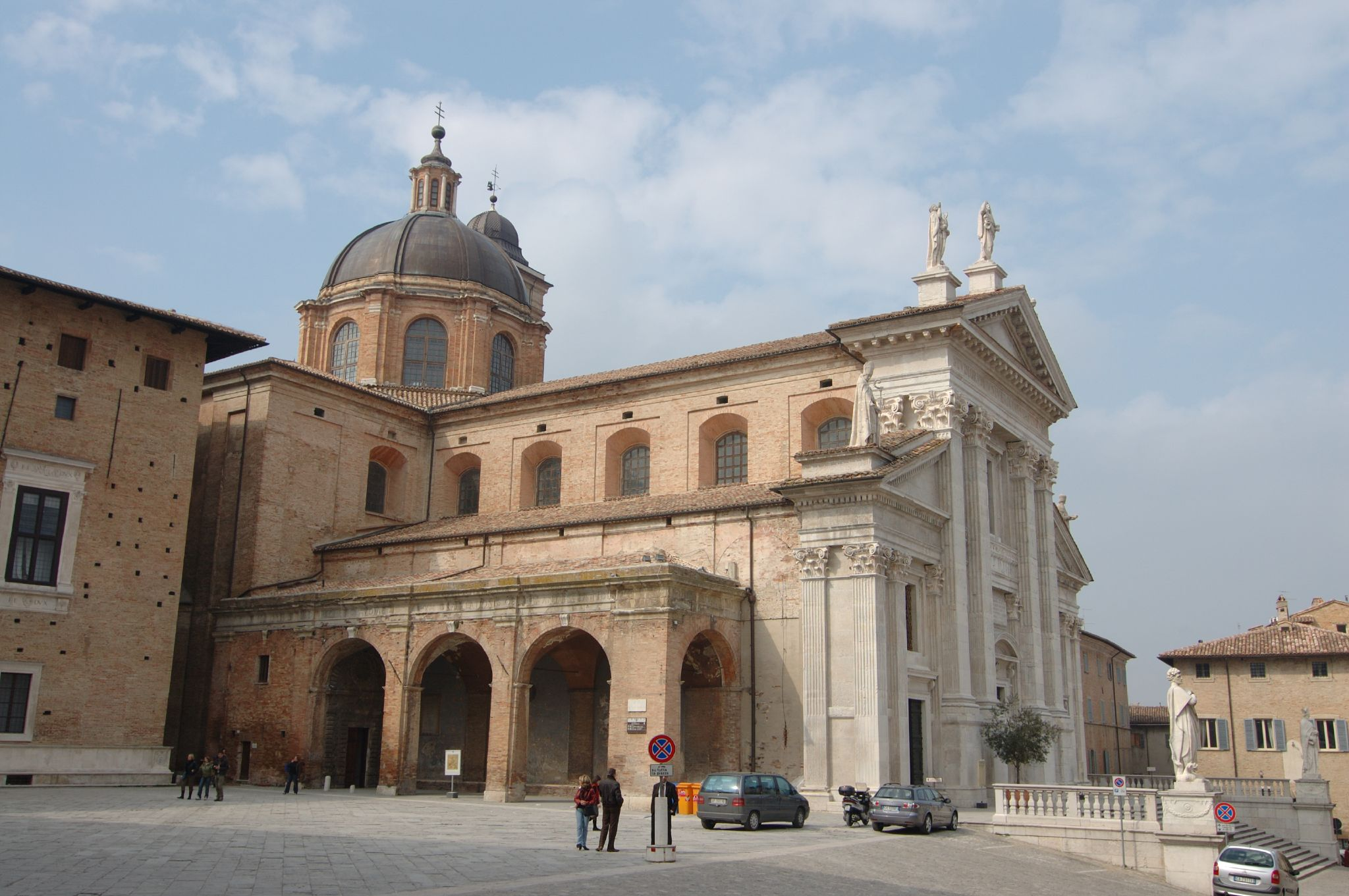
Urbino, Marche

This area is possibly the most visited in Italy and contains many popular attractions as well as sought-after landscapes. Rome boasts the remaining wonders of the Roman Empire and some of the world's best-known landmarks such as the Colosseum.

Florence, regarded as the birthplace of the Italian Renaissance, is Tuscany's most visited city, whereas nearby cities like Siena, Pisa, Arezzo and Lucca also have rich cultural heritage. Umbria's population is small but it has many important cities such as Perugia and Assisi. For similar reasons, Lazio and Tuscany are some of Italy's most visited regions and the main targets for Ecotourism.

Other cities in Marche like Pesaro, Fabriano and Urbino have a rich cultural heritage. This area is known for its picturesque landscapes and attracts tourists from all over the world, including Italy itself. Pristine landscapes serve as one of the primary motivators for tourists to visit central Italy, although there are others, such as a rich history of art.

=== Southern Italy ===
Regions: Apulia, Basilicata, Calabria, Campania, Abruzzo, and Molise

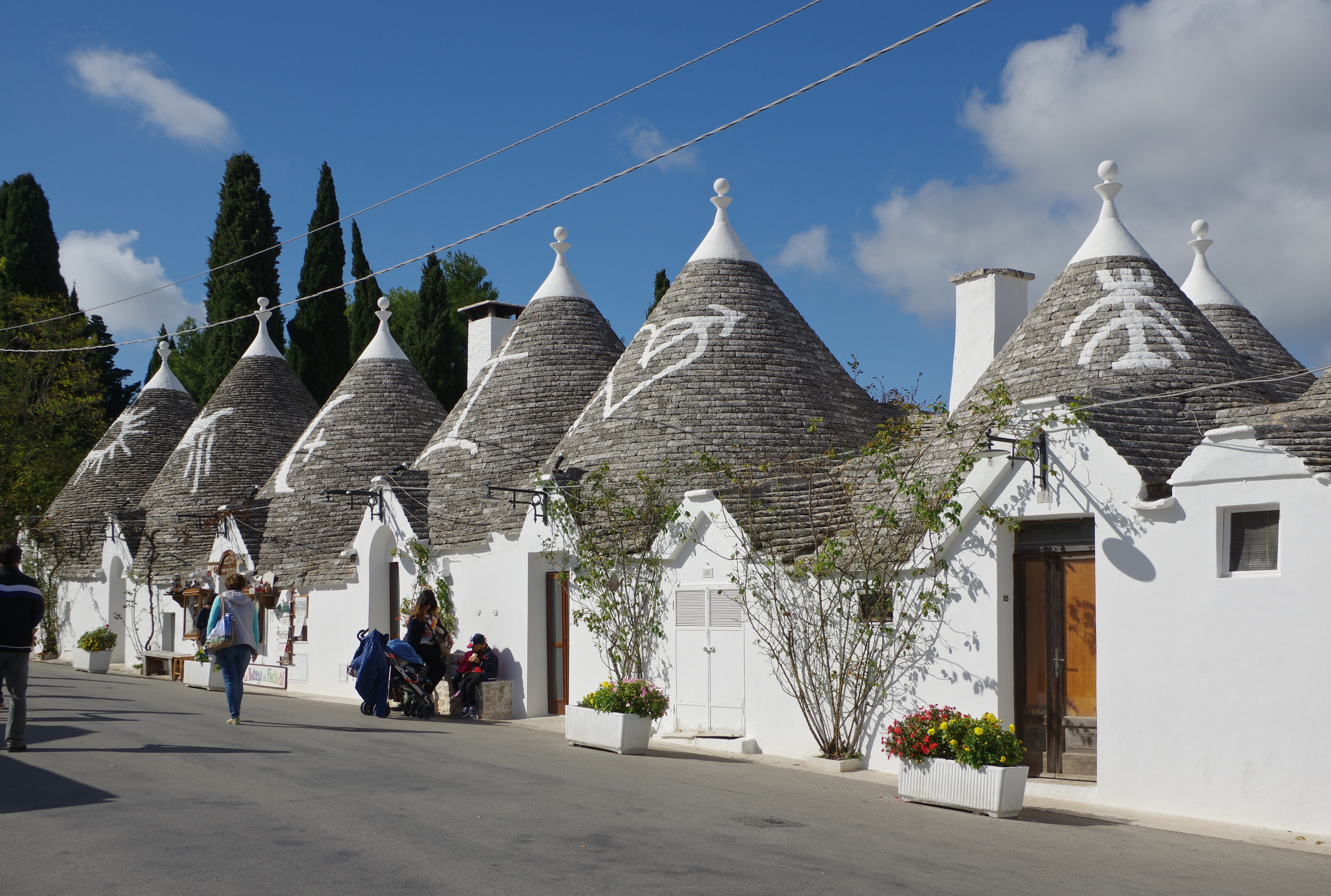
Trulli in Alberobello, Apulia

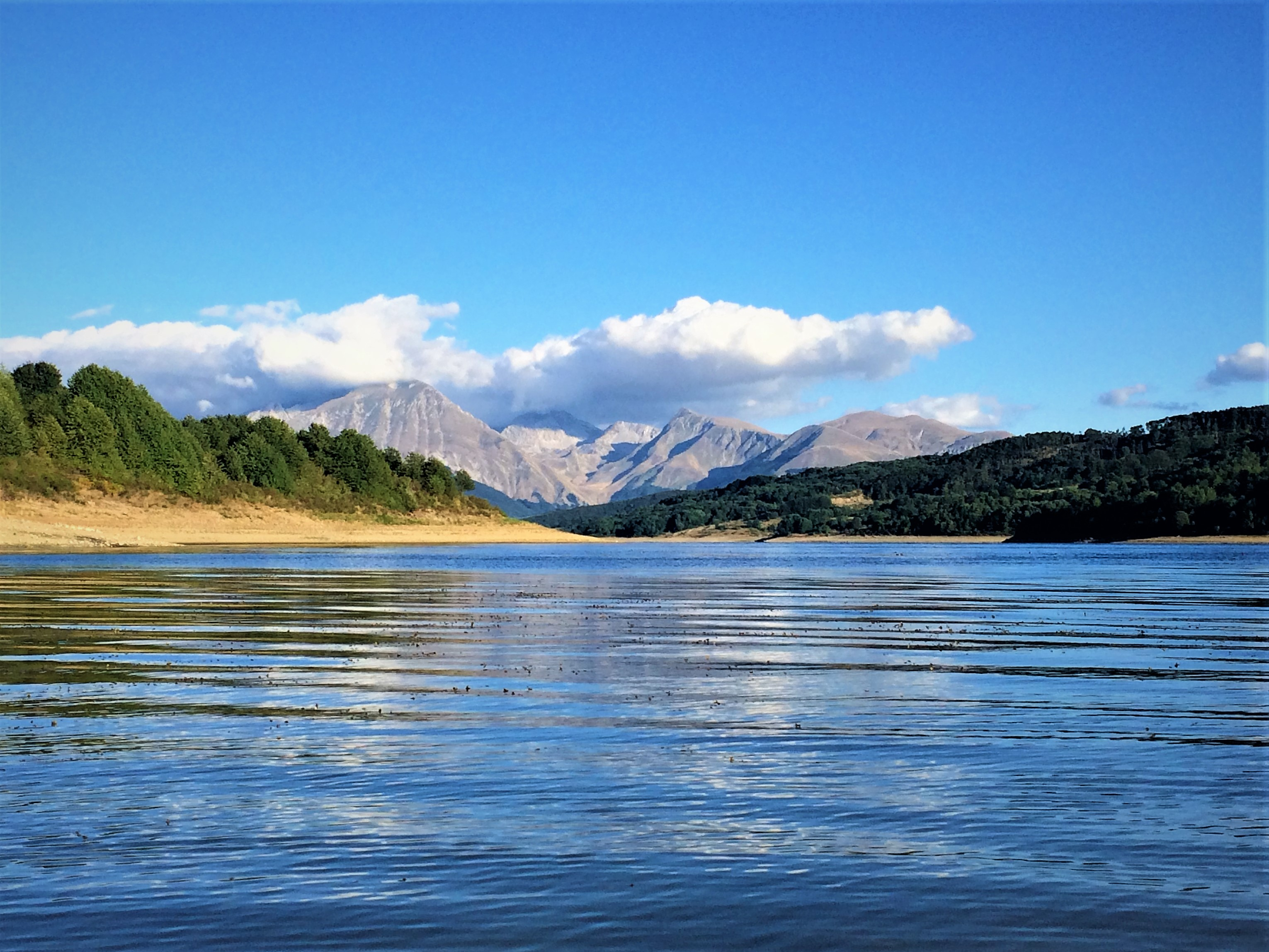
Campotosto Lake in National Park of Gran Sasso and Monti della Laga, Abruzzo

Southern Italy (also called Mezzogiorno) is well known for its cuisine, which offers a wide choice of food at lower prices. It is also known for the pairing of Mediterranean climate with the beautiful beaches of each region, an important element for local tourism. Naples is the most visited city in the area, and the ruins of Pompeii are the most visited sights.

Other important tourist destinations include the Amalfi Coast, Ravello, Benevento, Caserta, Salerno and Pozzuoli. The natural parks of Abruzzo, the greenest region in Europe, include the Abruzzo National Park, the National Park of Gran Sasso and Monti della Laga the Maiella National Park and Sirente-Velino Regional Park which attract thousands of visitors due to more than 30 protected Nature Reserves and the presence of 75% of all Europe's living species.

Apulia, which includes the historical cities of Lecce and Bari and villages composed of trulli; like Calabria it is famous for its coasts. Basilicata is very famous for so-called Sassi di Matera. The main cities of Molise are Campobasso and Isernia, the most important sight is the Basilica of Castelpetroso. Calabria coasts are very appreciated by tourists; the capital city is Catanzaro but its most populated city is Reggio Calabria.

=== Insular Italy ===
Regions: Sardinia and Sicily

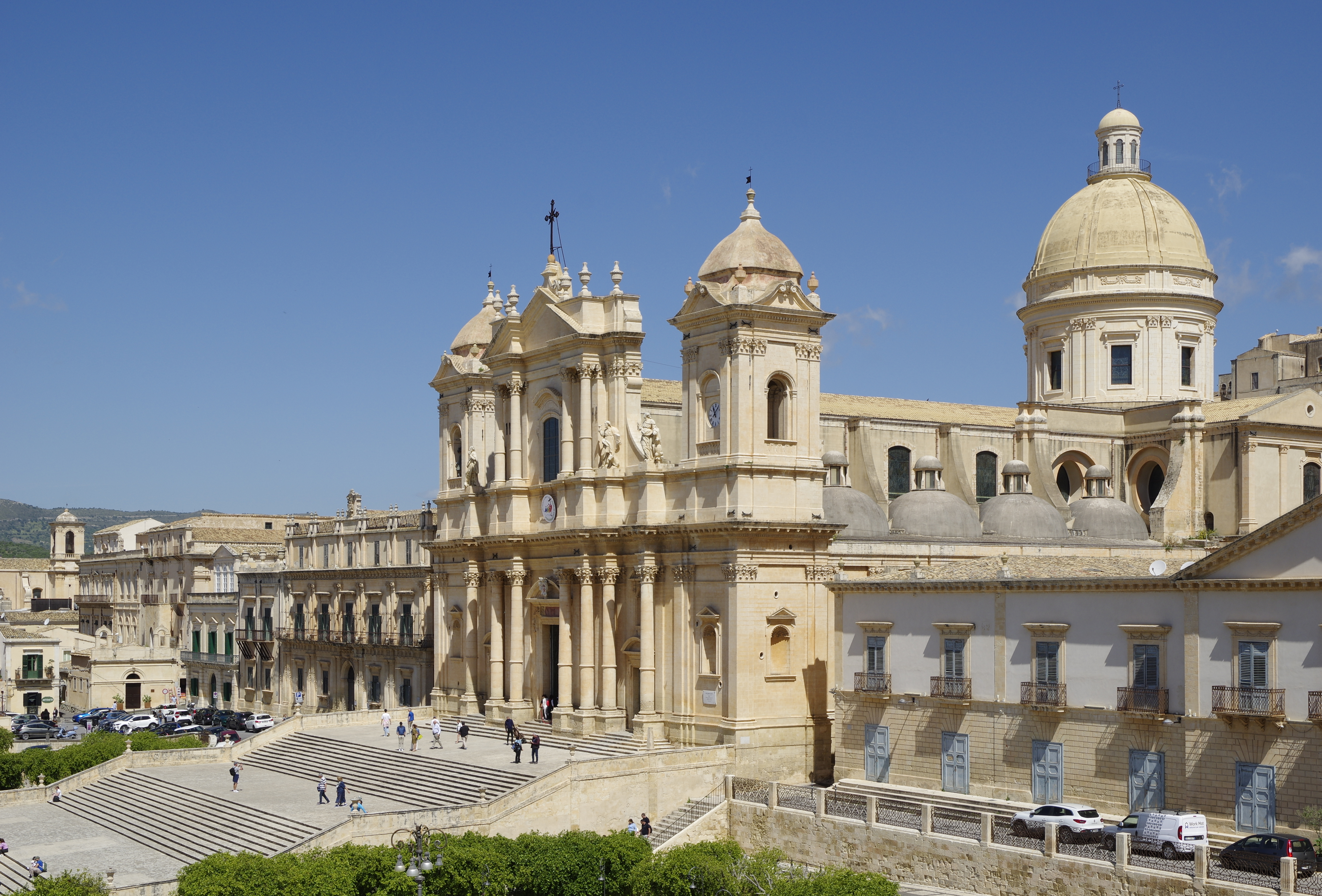
Noto Cathedral, Sicily

Sicily, the largest island in the country, is a diverse and popular tourist island, famous for its archaeology, seascape and unique Sicilian cuisine. Mount Etna, the beaches, the archaeological sites, and major cities such as Palermo, Catania, Trapani, Syracuse and Ragusa are the favourite tourist destinations, but the old town of Taormina and the neighbouring seaside resort of Giardini Naxos draw visitors from all over the world, as do the Aeolian Islands, the Aegadian Islands, Erice, Terrasini, Castellammare del Golfo, Monreale, Cefalù, Agrigento, the Pelagian Islands and Capo d'Orlando. An important sight is Val di Noto which offers a lot of Late Baroque cities built after the catastrophic earthquake of 1693.

Sardinia is a large island some 250 kilometres west of the Italian coastline. It includes several popular tourist attractions and has several beaches and archaeological ruins. It is also known for its beaches, which are among the most beautiful in the world, and include the famous pink beaches in the archipelago of La Maddalena. The most popular cities in Sardinia are: Cagliari, Sassari, Alghero, Olbia and Porto Cervo. Porto Cervo, located in Costa Smeralda, is a popular summer destination famous for its beaches and clubs among high-income earners.

== Vacation in Italy in ancient times ==
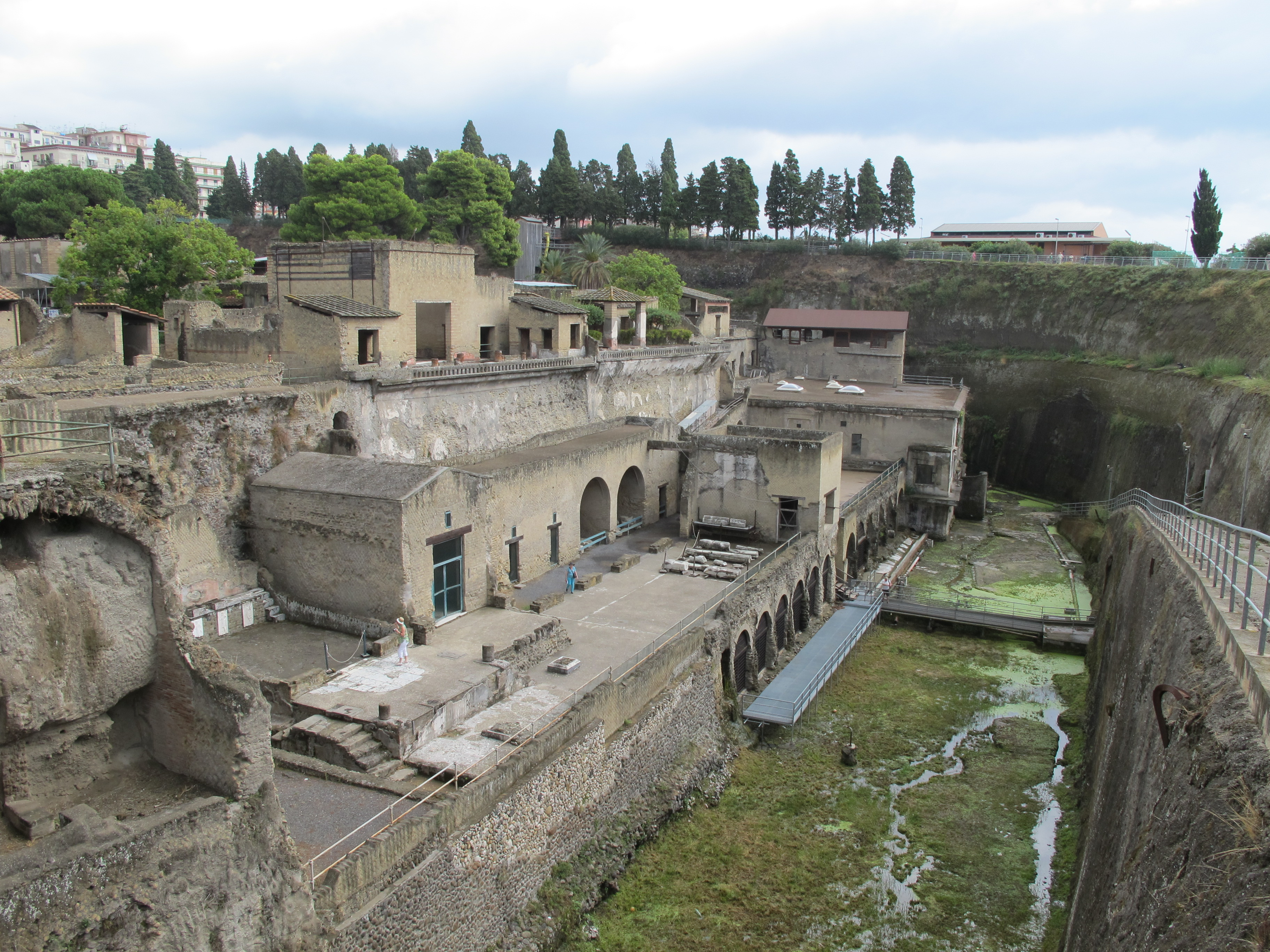
Ruins of Herculaneum

It was the ancient Romans who invented the concept of "vacation". The vacation was the prerogative of the patricians, the wealthiest social caste, who owned villas outside Rome, mainly in the Latium hinterland and on the Tyrrhenian coast. The most popular place in Roman Italy to vacation was Naples, an important cultural centre and a place that attracted artists, philosophers and scholars of the time.

The ancient Romans also visited Italy to learn about their origins, especially in regards to the history, ancient legends and myths related to the founding of Rome. Among the most popular destinations for this type of vacation were the Circeo, where the jug was kept which, according to tradition, had been used by Odysseus during his stay with the sorceress Circe. Another destination was a visit to the ship with which, according to tradition, Aeneas, a hero destined by fate to the founding of Rome, had arrived on the shores of Latium.

At the height of the imperial era, the city of Rome became a destination for aristocrats from all over the Roman province who visited the capital to admire its most important monuments such as the Colosseum, the Ara Pacis, the Pantheon and the Trajan's Column. However, the vacation resorts were numerous, from the lakes of Northern Italy to Sicily. The most visited by the ancient Romans were the Phlegraean Fields, Pozzuoli, the hill of Posillipo, Baiae, Cape Miseno and the island of Capri.

In particular, in Baiae, which was characterized by a favourable climate all year round, there were natural springs of sulphurous hot water with healing properties. The city then became a famous seaside resort, embellished by the presence of spas and luxurious villas. Here Julius Caesar, Pompey, Marcus Licinius Crassus, Cicero, Seneca the Younger, Caligula and Nero owned a villa for vacationing. Other important vacation localities of the ancient Romans were Pompeii and Herculaneum, which were destroyed by the eruption of Mount Vesuvius in 79 AD.

== Cities ==
=== Rome ===
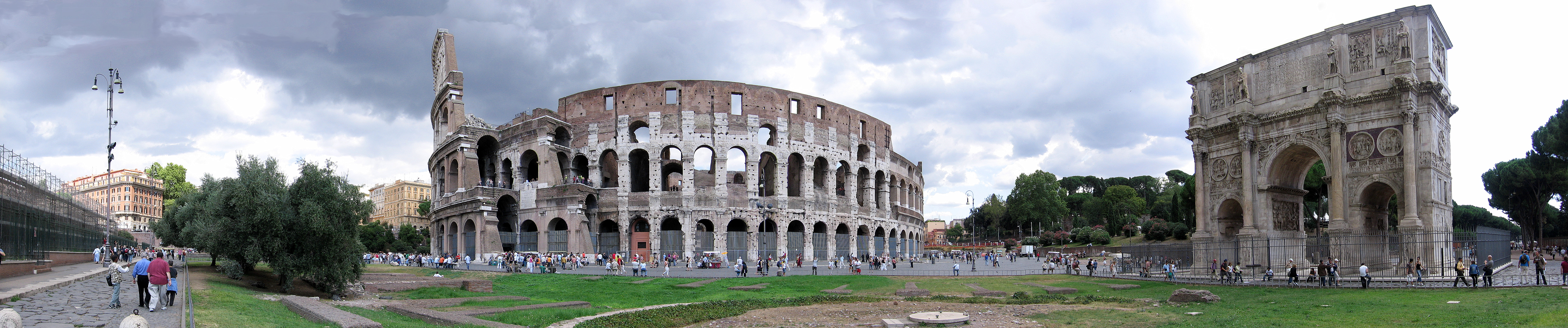
The Colosseum and the Arch of Constantine

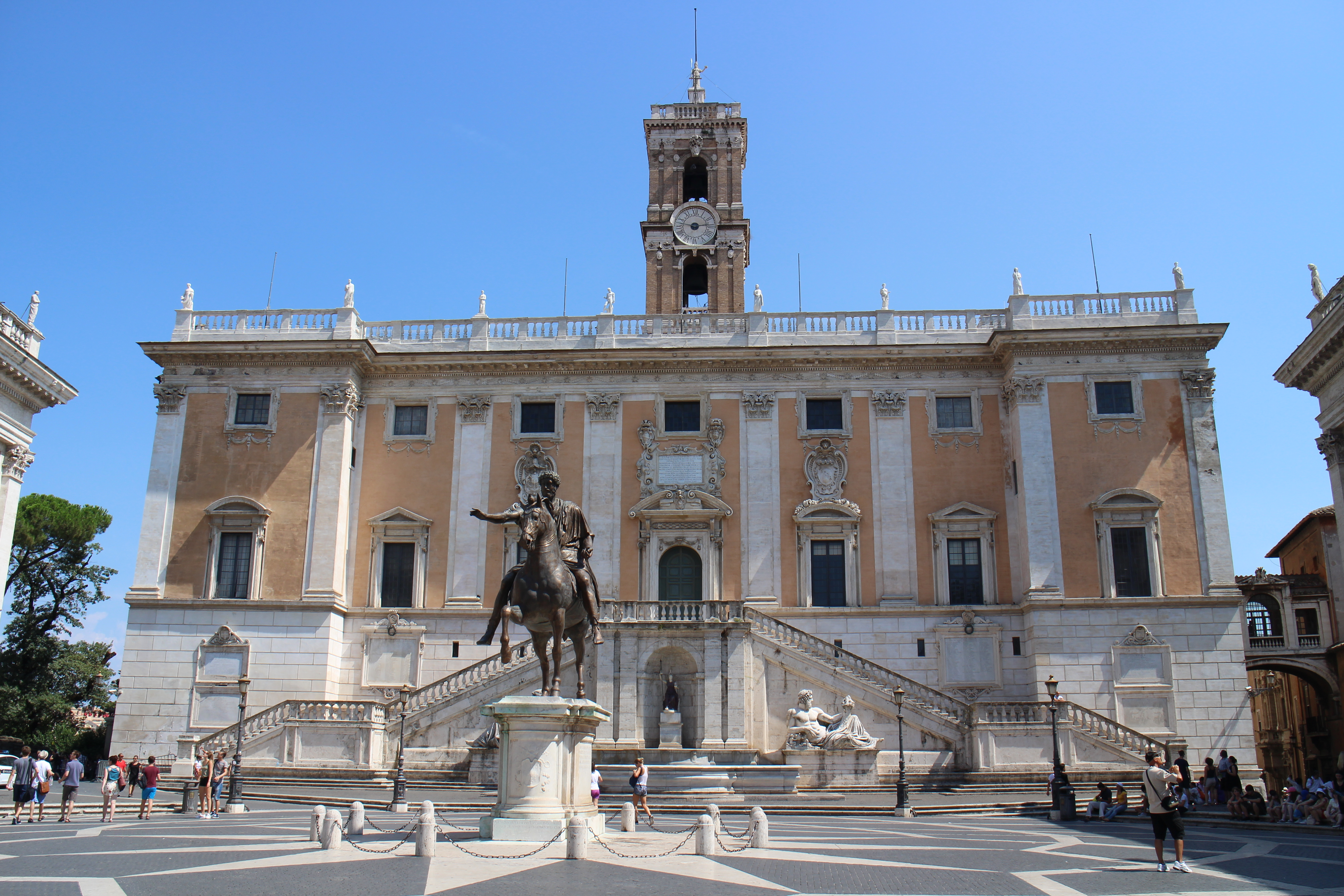
Palazzo Senatorio, seat of the municipality of Rome. It has been a town hall since AD 1144, making it the oldest town hall in the world.

Rome is the capital city of Italy. It is also the capital of the Lazio region, the centre of the Metropolitan City of Rome, and a special comune named Comune di Roma Capitale. Rome is the country's most populated comune and the third most populous city in the European Union by population within city limits. Rome is located in the central-western portion of the Italian Peninsula, within Lazio (Latium), along the shores of the Tiber. Vatican City (the smallest country in the world) is an independent country inside the city boundaries of Rome, the only existing example of a country within a city; for this reason, Rome has sometimes been described as the capital of two states.

Rome is often referred to as the City of Seven Hills due to its geographic location, and also as the "Eternal City". Rome is generally considered to be the "cradle of Western Christian culture and civilization", and the centre of the Catholic Church. Rome's history spans 28 centuries. While Roman mythology dates the founding of Rome at around 753 BC, the site has been inhabited for much longer, making it a major human settlement for almost three millennia and one of the oldest continuously occupied cities in Europe. The city's early population originated from a mix of Latins, Etruscans, and Sabines. Eventually, the city successively became the capital of the Roman Kingdom, the Roman Republic and the Roman Empire, and is regarded by many as the first-ever Imperial city and metropolis. It was first called The Eternal City (Latin: Urbs Aeterna; Italian: La Città Eterna) by the Roman poet Tibullus in the 1st century BC, and the expression was also taken up by Ovid, Virgil, and Livy. Rome is also called "Caput Mundi" (Capital of the World).

Rome has become increasingly popular as a tourist destination globally. 45.6% from 2006 (6.03 million), Rome hosted 8.78 million international tourists in 2014, placing itself as the 14th most visited city in the world. Popular tourists attractions in the city include the Colosseum, St Peter's Basilica, the Pantheon and so on, all of which are part of the World Heritage property. Other main sights in the city include, the Trevi Fountain, Piazza Navona, Roman Forum, Castel Sant'Angelo, the Basilica of St. John Lateran, the Spanish Steps, Villa Borghese park, Piazza del Popolo, the Trastevere and the Janiculum.

=== Milan ===
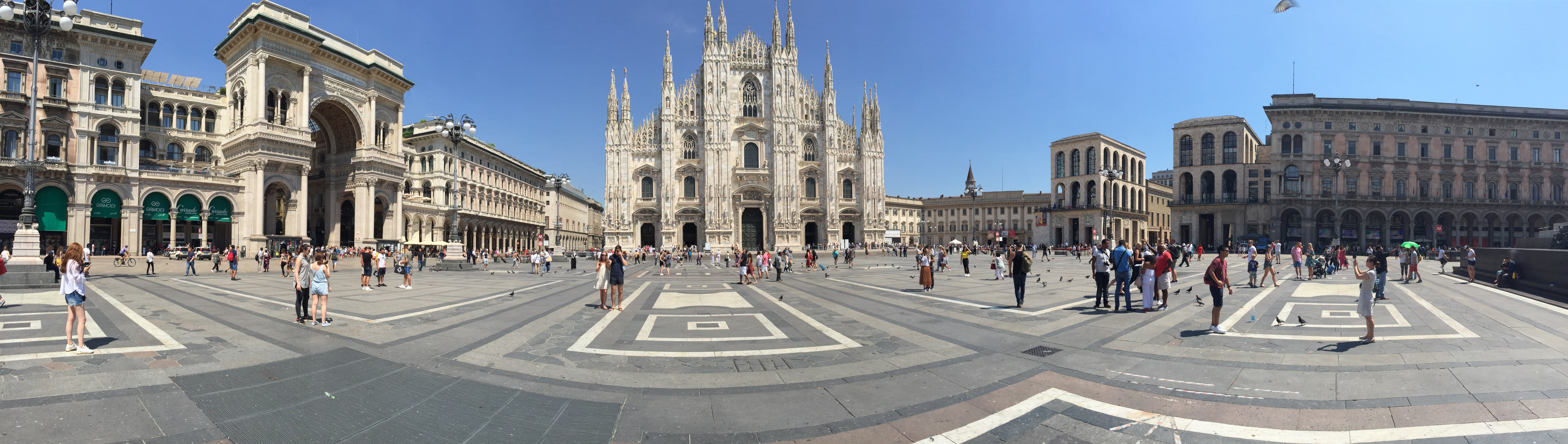
The Galleria Vittorio Emanuele II, the Milan Cathedral, the Royal Palace of Milan and the Palazzo dell'Arengario in Piazza del Duomo

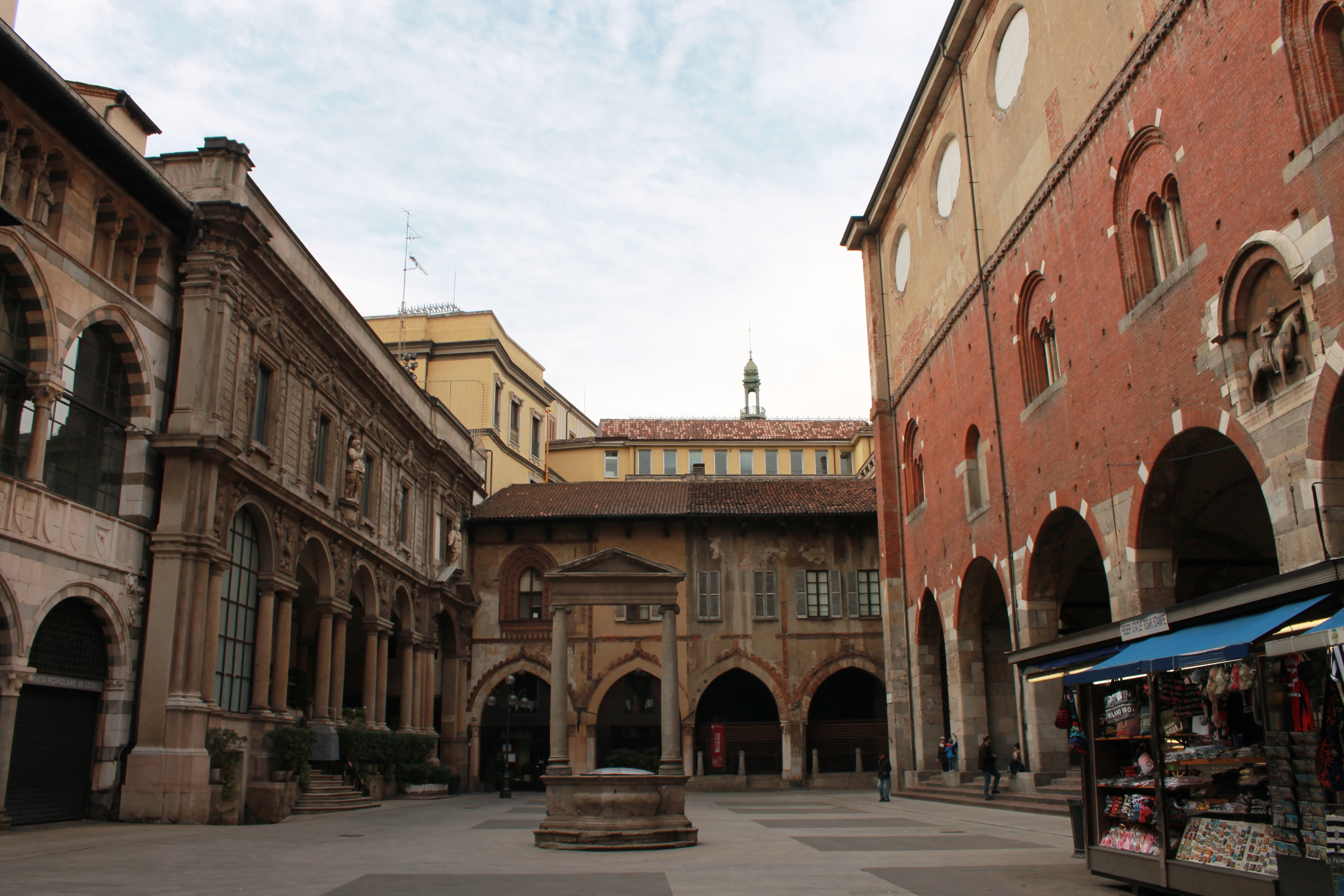
Piazza Mercanti used to be the heart of Milan in the Middle Ages.

Milan is a city in northern Italy, capital of Lombardy, and the second-most populous city proper in Italy after Rome. Milan is considered a leading alpha global city, with strengths in the fields of art, commerce, design, education, entertainment, fashion, finance, healthcare, media, services, research and tourism. Its business district hosts Italy's stock exchange (Italian: Borsa Italiana), and the headquarters of national and international banks and companies. In terms of GDP, Milan is the wealthiest city in Italy, it has the third-largest economy among EU cities after Paris and Madrid and is the wealthiest among EU non-capital cities. Milan is viewed along with Turin as the southernmost part of the Blue Banana urban development corridor (also known as the "European Megalopolis"), and one of the Four Motors for Europe.

Milan is one of Europe's most important tourist destinations, and Italy's second; with 6.05 million international arrivals as measured in 2014, it placed itself as the 24th most visited city in the world. According to a particular source, 56% of international visitors to Milan are from Europe, whilst 44% of the city's tourists are Italian, and 56% are from abroad. The most important European Union markets are the United Kingdom (16%), Germany (9%) and France (6%). According to the same study, most of the visitors who come from the United States to the city go on business matters, whilst Chinese and Korean tourists mainly take up the leisure segment.

The city boasts several popular tourist attractions, such as the city's Duomo and Piazza, the Teatro alla Scala, the San Siro Stadium, the Vittorio Emanuele II Gallery, the Sforza Castle, the Pinacoteca di Brera and the Via Monte Napoleone. Most tourists visit sights such as Milan Cathedral, the Sforza Castle and the Teatro alla Scala, however, other main sights such as the Basilica of Sant'Ambrogio, the Navigli and the Brera district are less visited and prove to be less popular.

The city also has numerous hotels, including the ultra-luxurious Town House Galleria, which is the world's first seven-star hotel, ranked officially by the Société Générale de Surveillance, and one of The Leading Hotels of the World. The average stay for a tourist in the city is of 3.43 nights, whilst foreigners stay for longer periods of time, 77% of which stay for a 2-5 night average. Of the 75% of visitors who stay in hotels, 4-star ones are the most popular (47%), whilst 5-stars, or less than 3-stars, represent 11% and 15% of the charts respectively.

=== Naples ===
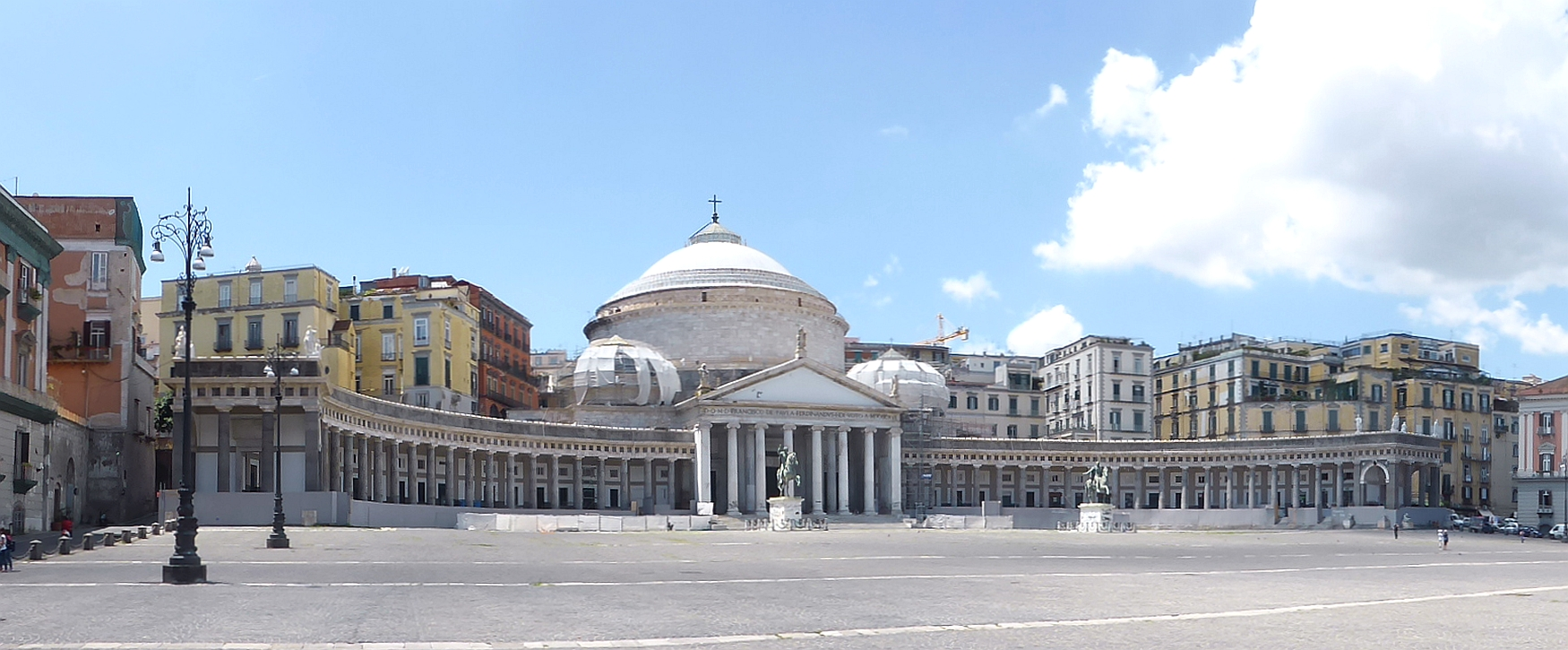
San Francesco di Paola, Naples, in Piazza del Plebiscito

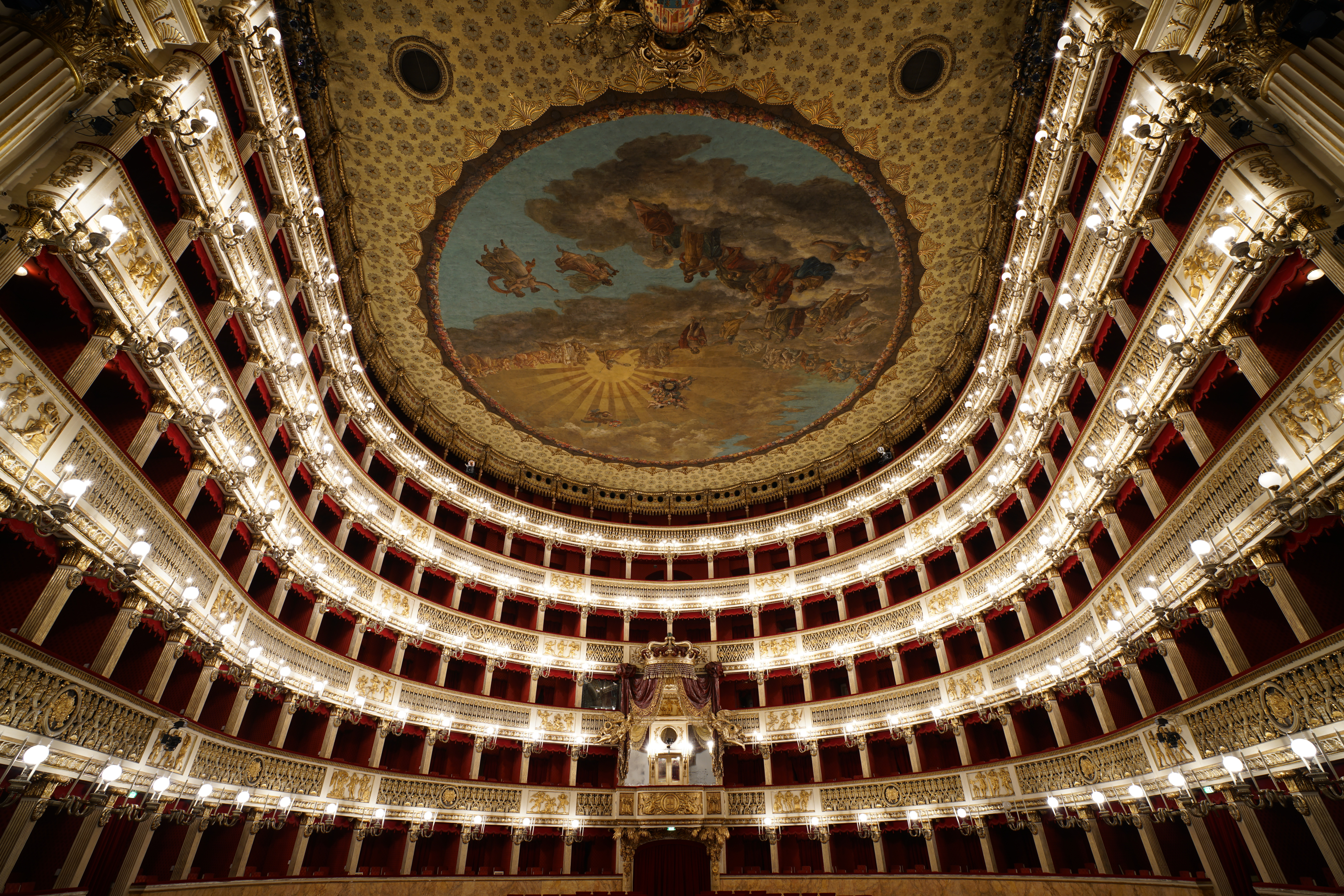
Teatro di San Carlo, the oldest continuously active venue for opera in the world

Naples is the regional capital of Campania and the third-largest city of Italy, after Rome and Milan. Founded by Greeks in the first millennium BC, Naples is one of the oldest continuously inhabited urban areas in the world. In the ninth century BC, a colony known as Parthenope (Ancient Greek: Παρθενόπη) was established on the Island of Megaride. In the 6th century BC, it was refounded as Neápolis. The city was an important part of Magna Graecia, played a major role in the merging of Greek and Roman society, and was a significant cultural centre under the Romans.

Its historic city centre is the largest in Europe and is listed as a UNESCO World Heritage Site. Naples is also near the famous volcano Vesuvius and the ruins of the ancient Roman towns of Pompeii and Ercolano. Before Italian unification, it was the capital of Kingdom of the Two Sicilies and the most important and populated city of Italy. Naples is well known for cuisine, especially for pizza. In the city there are many tourist attractions, such as the Royal Palace, the basilica of Santa Chiara, the Gesù Nuovo (New Jesus) church, Castel dell'Ovo, the Castel Nuovo, the Castel Sant'Elmo, the city's Duomo, the Real Teatro di San Carlo (the oldest continuously active opera house in the world), the Palace of Capodimonte, the Naples underground geothermal tunnels, the Via Tribunali, Spaccanapoli street, the Veiled Christ (one of the world's most remarkable sculptures), the various catacombs around the city (for example the Catacombs of San Gennaro, or the Fontanelle cemetery, or the Catacombs of Saint Gaudiosus), the Umberto I Gallery and the Via Toledo with its metro considered one of the most beautiful of Europe.

The Archaeological Museum of Naples includes Roman history as well as Egyptian and Greek artefacts. It is the home of the Federico II, the oldest public and secular university in the world, and of L'Orientale, the oldest school of Sinology and Oriental Studies in Europe.

Naples is known for its picturesque waterfront promenades and locations at Gaiola Island and Marechiaro. Close to Naples are widely recognized tourist attractions such as the Amalfi Coast, Capri island, Ischia island, Procida island, the city of Sorrento, and the city of Salerno.

=== Florence ===
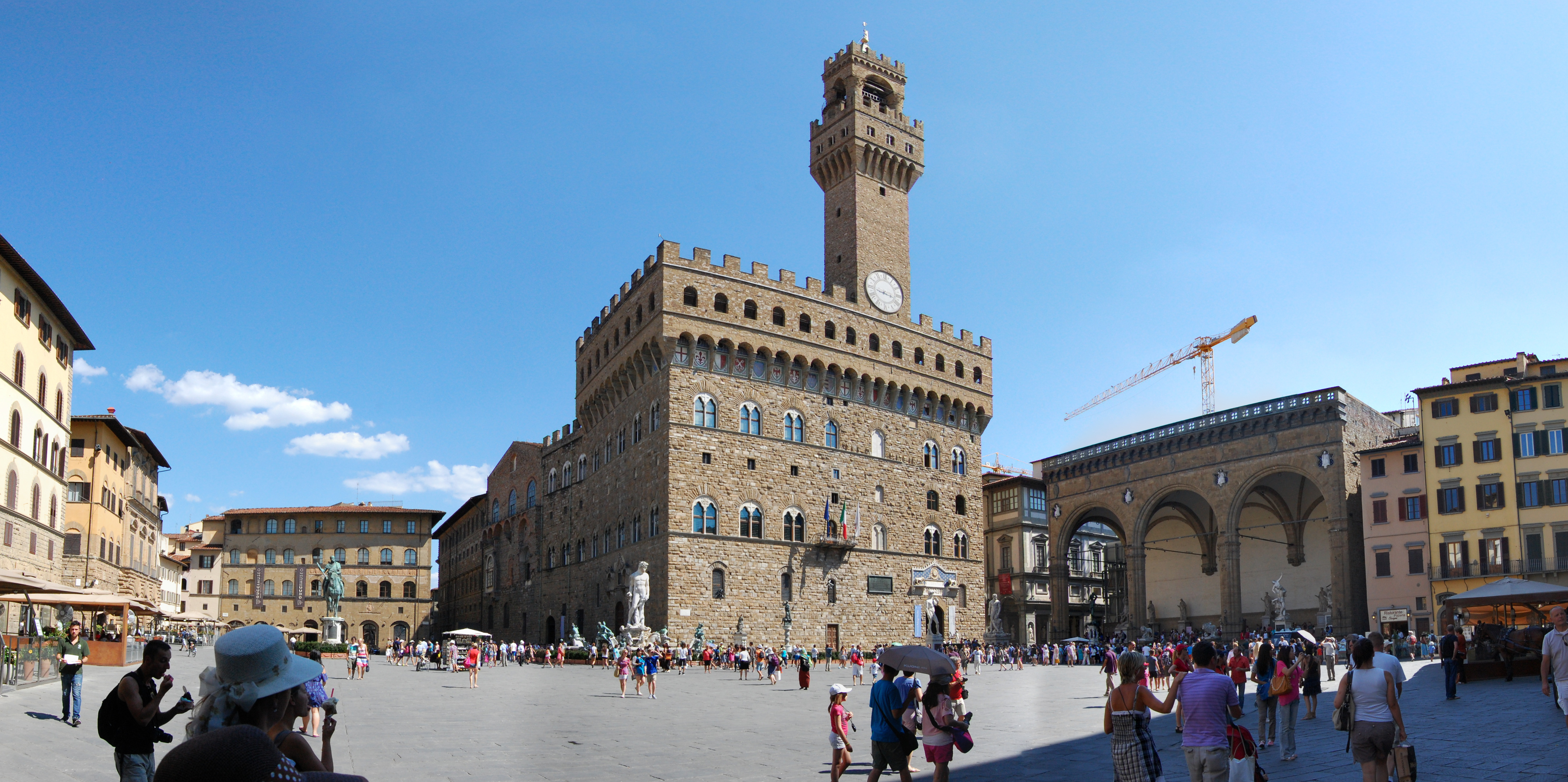
Piazza della Signoria in Florence with the Palazzo Vecchio and the Loggia dei Lanzi

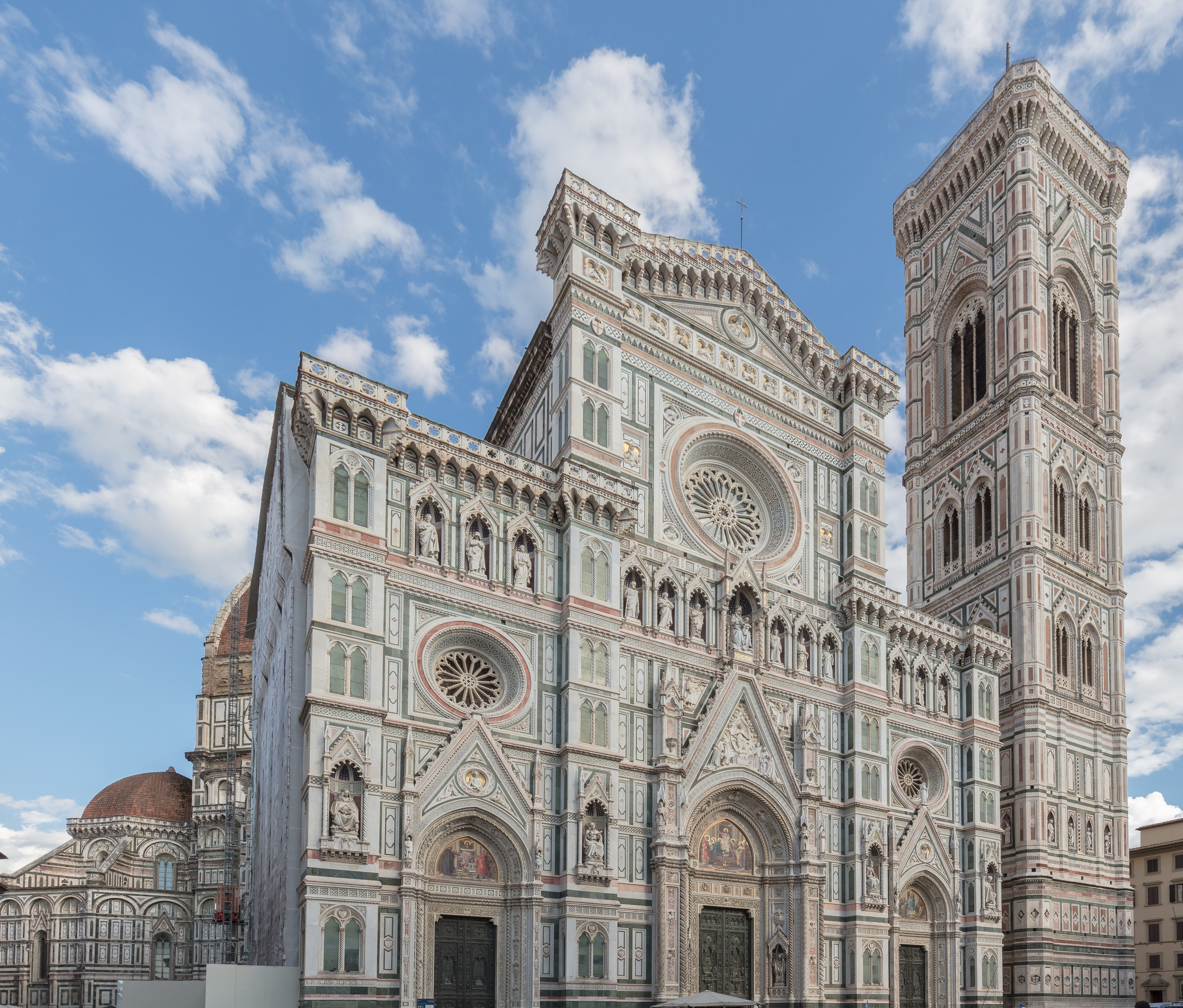
The Santa Maria del Fiore cathedral by Filippo Brunelleschi, which has the largest brick dome in the world

Florence is a city in Central-Northern Italy and the capital city of the Tuscany region. It is the most populated city in Tuscany, with 383,084 inhabitants in 2013, and over 1,520,000 in its metropolitan area.

Florence was a centre of medieval European trade and finance and one of the wealthiest cities of that era. It is considered by many academics to have been the birthplace of the Renaissance, becoming a major artistic, cultural, commercial, political, economic and financial center. During this time, Florence rose to a position of enormous influence in Italy, Europe, and beyond. Its turbulent political history includes periods of rule by the powerful Medici family and numerous religious and republican revolutions. From 1865 to 1871 the city served as the capital of the Kingdom of Italy (established in 1861). The Florentine dialect forms the base of Standard Italian and it became the language of culture throughout Italy due to the prestige of the masterpieces by Dante Alighieri, Petrarch, Giovanni Boccaccio, Niccolò Machiavelli and Francesco Guicciardini.

The city attracts millions of tourists each year, and UNESCO declared the Historic Centre of Florence a World Heritage Site in 1982. The city is noted for its culture, Renaissance art and architecture and monuments. The city also contains numerous museums and art galleries, such as the Uffizi Gallery and the Palazzo Pitti, and still exerts an influence in the fields of art, culture and politics. Due to Florence's artistic and architectural heritage, Forbes has ranked it as the most beautiful city in the world.

Florence plays an important role in Italian fashion, and is ranked in the top 15 fashion capitals of the world by Global Language Monitor; furthermore, it is a major national economic centre, as well as a tourist and industrial hub. It is the 4th richest Italian city.

=== Venice ===
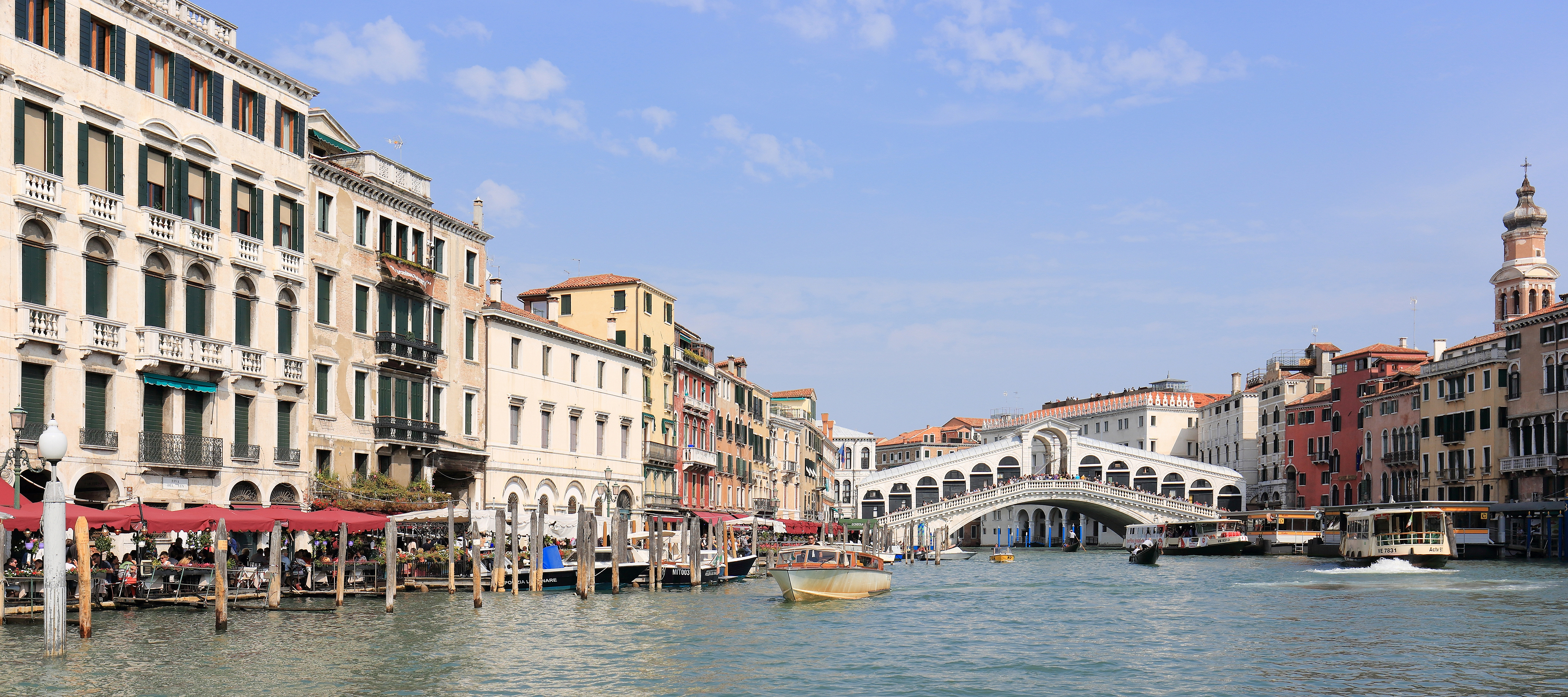
Venice, with the Rialto Bridge in the background

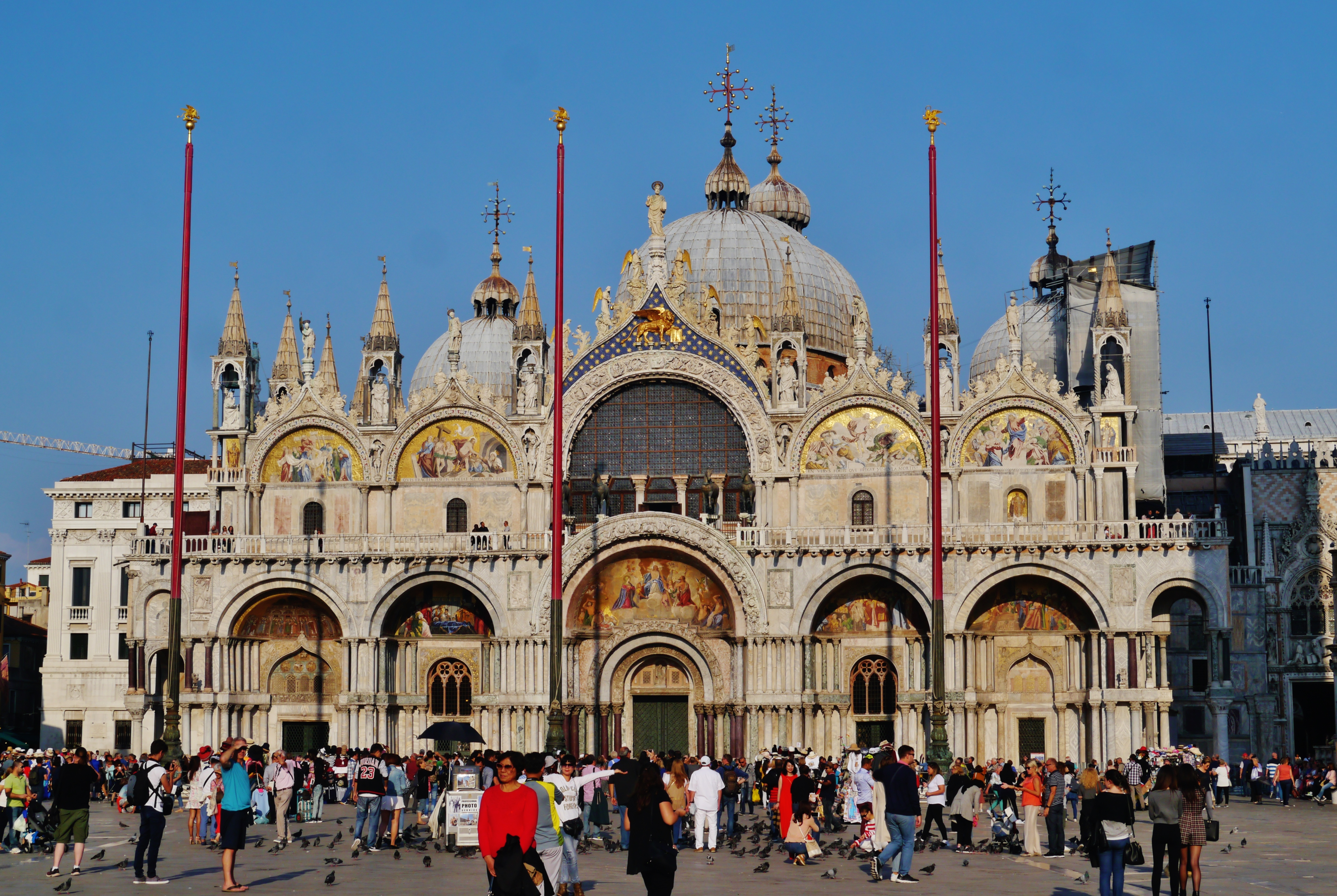
St Mark's Basilica in Venice, one of the best known examples of Italo-Byzantine architecture

Venice is a city in northeastern Italy and the capital of the Veneto region. It is built on a group of 118 small islands that are separated by canals and linked by over 400 bridges. The islands are in the shallow Venetian Lagoon, an enclosed bay lying between the mouths of the Po and the Piave rivers (more exactly between the Brenta and the Sile). In 2020, 258,685 people resided in the Comune di Venezia, of whom around 55,000 live in the historical city of Venice (centro storico). Together with Padua and Treviso, the city is included in the Padua-Treviso-Venice Metropolitan Area (PATREVE), which is considered a statistical metropolitan area, with a total population of 2.6 million.

The name is derived from the ancient Veneti people who inhabited the region by the 10th century BC. The city was historically the capital of the Republic of Venice for over a millennium, from 697 to 1797. It was a major financial and maritime power during the Middle Ages and Renaissance, and a staging area for the Crusades and the Battle of Lepanto, as well as an important centre of commerce—especially silk, grain, and spice, and of art from the 13th century to the end of the 17th. The city-state of Venice is considered to have been the first real international financial centre, emerging in the 9th century and reaching its greatest prominence in the 14th century. This made Venice a wealthy city throughout most of its history. After the Napoleonic Wars and the Congress of Vienna, the Republic was annexed by the Austrian Empire, until it became part of the Kingdom of Italy in 1866, following a referendum held as a result of the Third Italian War of Independence.

Venice has been known as "La Dominante", "La Serenissima", "Queen of the Adriatic", "City of Water", "City of Masks", "City of Bridges", "The Floating City", and "City of Canals". The lagoon and a part of the city are listed as a UNESCO World Heritage Site. Parts of Venice are renowned for the beauty of their settings, their architecture, and artwork. Venice is known for several important artistic movements—especially during the Renaissance period—and has played an important role in the history of instrumental and operatic music, and is the birthplace of Baroque composers Tomaso Albinoni and Antonio Vivaldi.

Although the city is facing some challenges (including an excessive number of tourists and problems caused by pollution, tide peaks and cruise ships sailing too close to buildings), Venice remains a very popular tourist destination, a major cultural centre, and has been ranked many times the most beautiful city in the world. It has been described by the Times Online as one of Europe's most romantic cities and by The New York Times as "undoubtedly the most beautiful city built by man".

=== Other cities ===
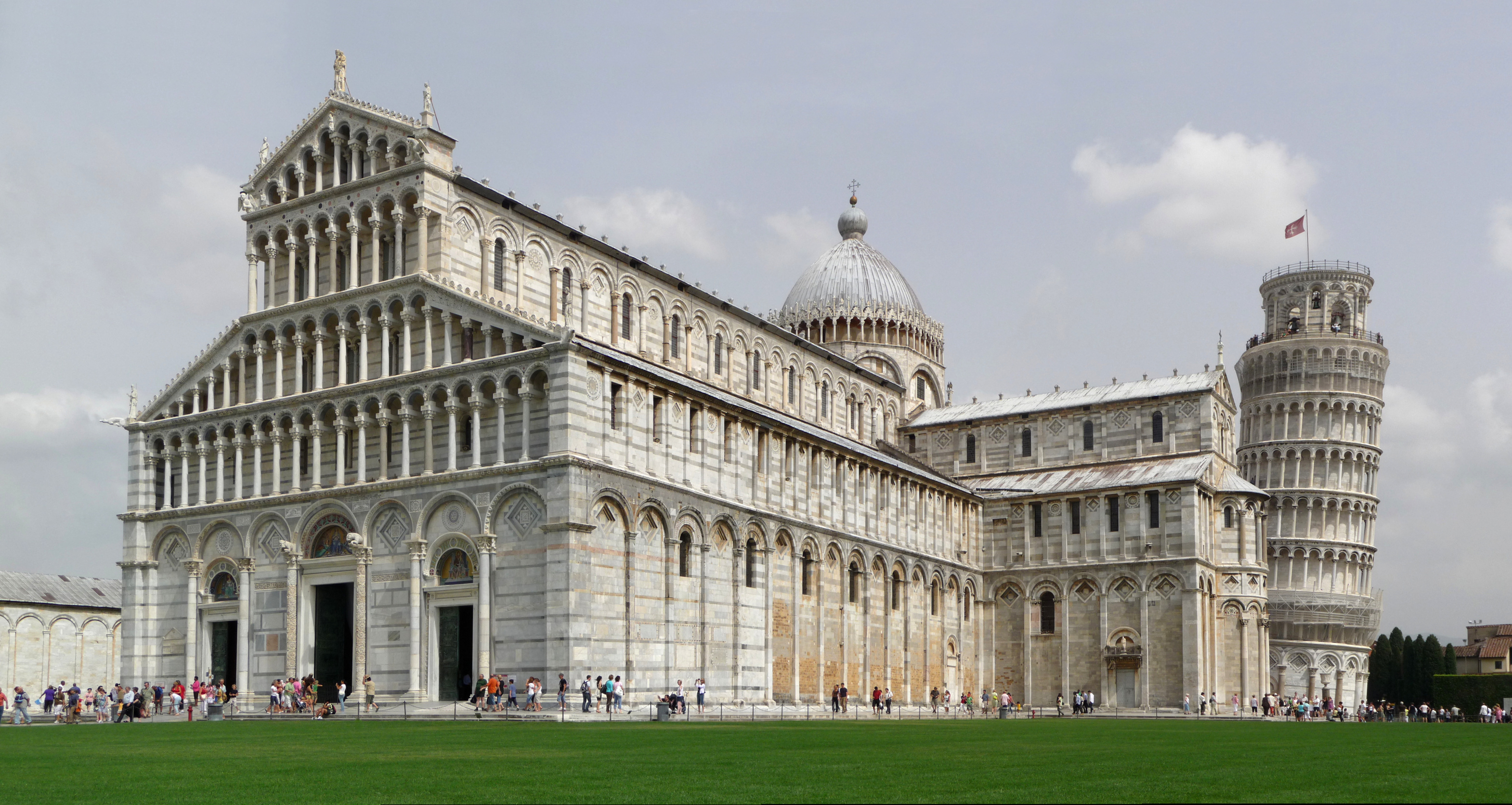
The Duomo and the Leaning Tower of Pisa

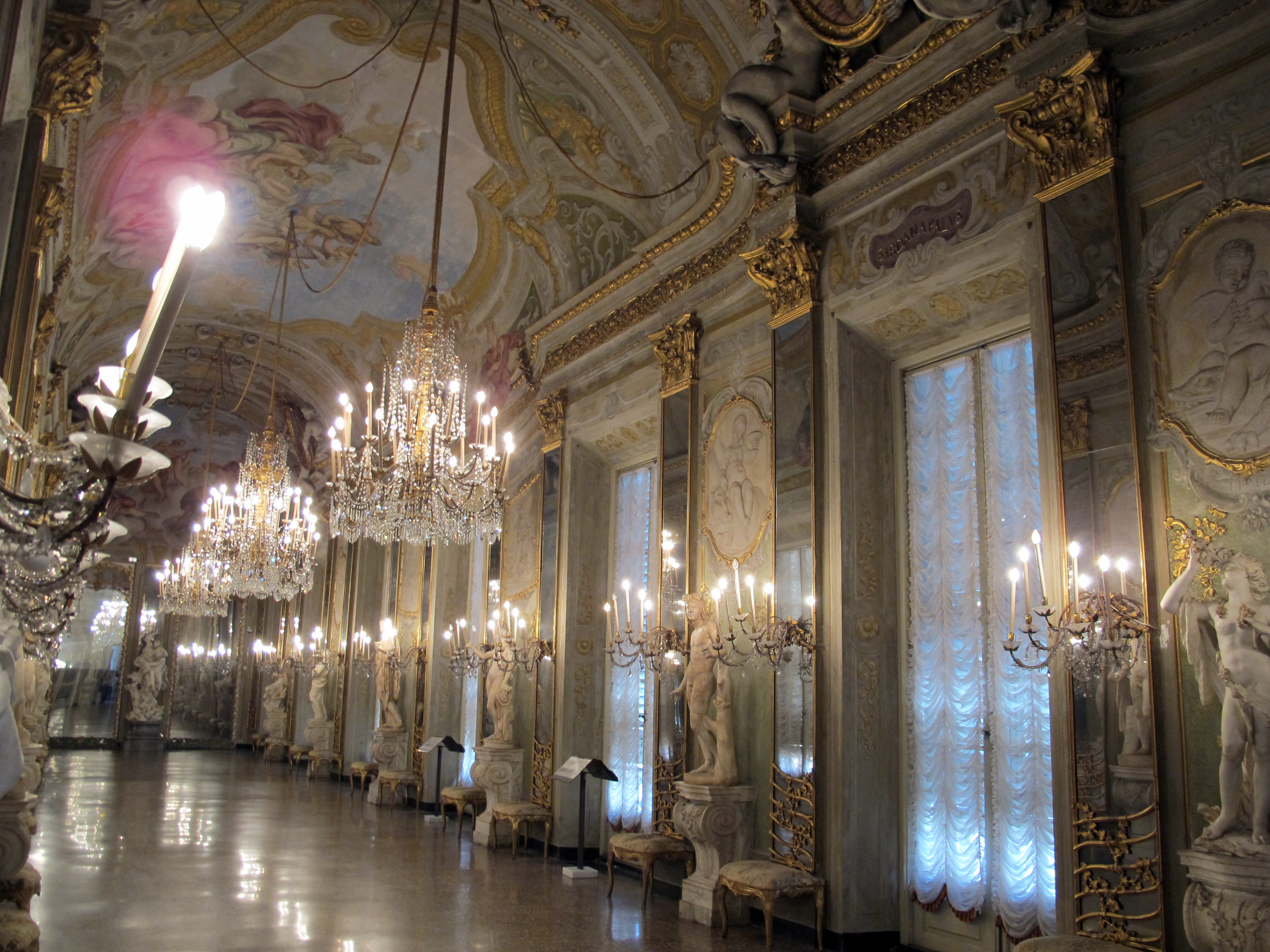
The Mirror Gallery of the Royal Palace of Genoa

- Palermo—ancient capital of the Kingdom of Sicily and of the Holy Roman Empire under Frederick II. It is noted for its history, gastronomy and architecture; the particularity of the city (such as the rest of Sicily) is that is a meeting point of Greek, Roman, Arabian, Norman and Aragonian cultures.
- Bologna—home of the first university in the western world. This city has a rich history, culture, and technology. Bologna is well known for its cuisine.
- Bari—is well known as a port and university city as well as the city of Saint Nicholas. Capital of Apulia and second most important economic centre of Southern Italy after Naples. The city has a rich culture and history.
- Genoa (Genova)— the Republic of Genoa was one of the most important maritime republics of the Middle Ages. Very wealthy and diverse city. Its port brings in tourism and trade, along with art and architecture. Genoa is the birthplace of Christopher Columbus and the originator of jeans.
- Pisa—the Republic of Pisa was one of the medieval maritime republics, and the city has many medieval palaces and squares. Home to the unmistakable image of the Leaning Tower of Pisa. A very touristy city. Famous too for the Scuola Normale Superiore di Pisa.
- Turin (Torino)—the first capital of Italy, after being the capital of Kingdom of Piedmont-Sardinia, which had promoted national reunification. The city has a rich culture and history. Home of the FIAT, the most important industry in Italy, Turin is a well-known industrial city, based on the aerospace industry and, of course, the automobile industry. Home of the 2006 Winter Olympics.
- Verona—it is one of the main tourist destinations in northern Italy because of its artistic heritage and several annual fairs and shows as well as the opera season in the Arena, an ancient Roman amphitheatre.
- Padua (Padova)—it is picturesque, with a dense network of arcaded streets opening into large communal piazze, and many bridges crossing the various branches of the Bacchiglione, which once surrounded the ancient walls like a moat.

== Other popular destinations ==
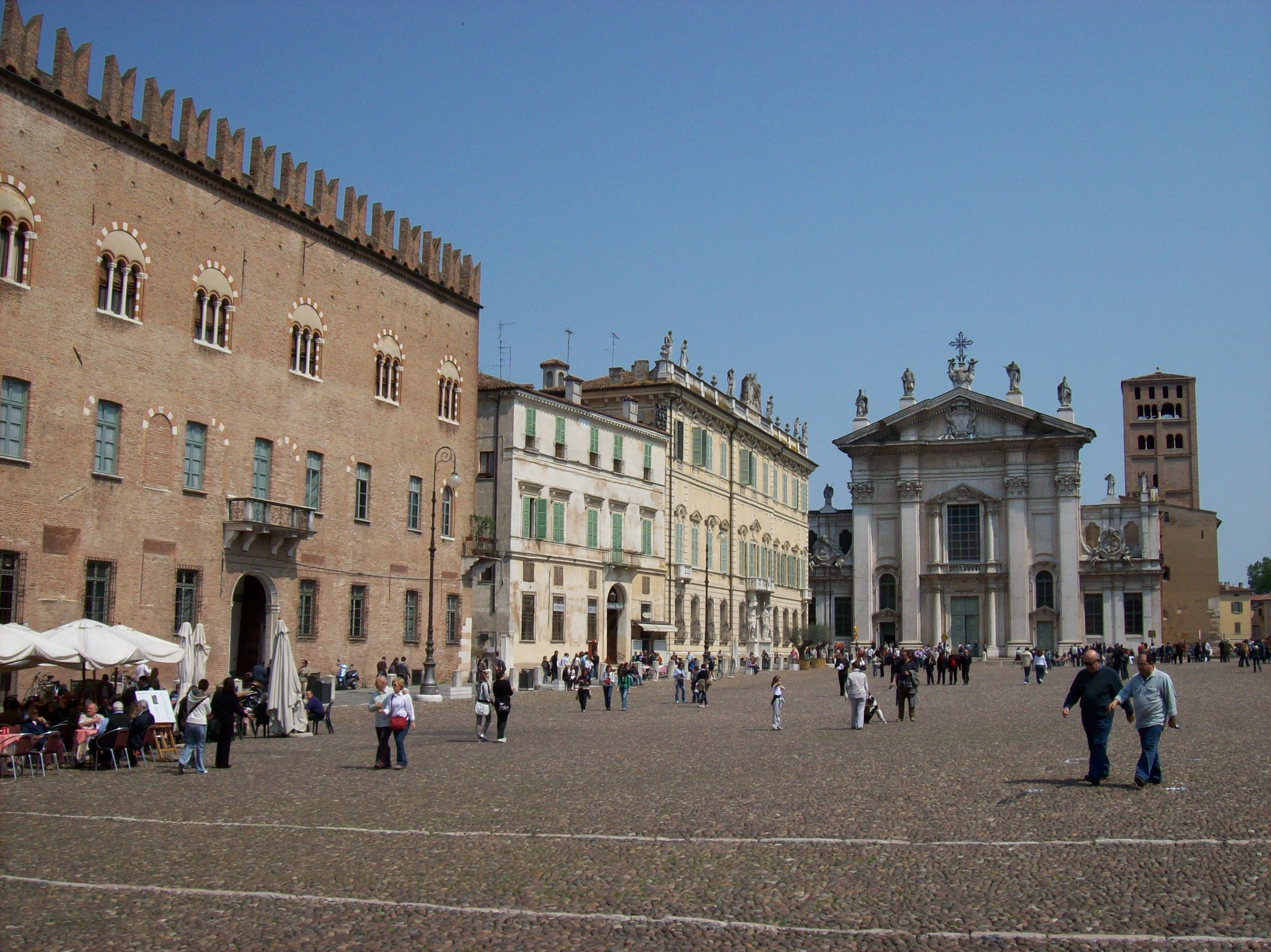
Mantua, Lombardy

Apart from Rome, Milan, Naples, Venice, and Florence are the top destinations for tourism in Italy. Other major tourist locations include Turin, Verona, Bari, Padua, Bologna, Mantua, Messina, Perugia, Palermo, Genoa, Sicily, Sardinia, and Salento.

Two factors in each of these locations are history and geography. The Roman Empire, Middle Ages, Renaissance and the following centuries of the history of Italy have left many cultural artefacts that attract tourists. Winter and summer tourism are present in many locations in the Alps and the Apennines, while seaside tourism is widespread in coastal locations along the Mediterranean Sea.

Italy is home to 60 UNESCO World Heritage Sites, more than any other country, including many entire cities such as Verona, Siena, Vicenza, Ferrara, San Gimignano, Urbino, Matera, Pompei, Noto and Siracusa. Ravenna hosts an unprecedented eight different internationally recognized sites.

== Accommodation capacity in Italy ==
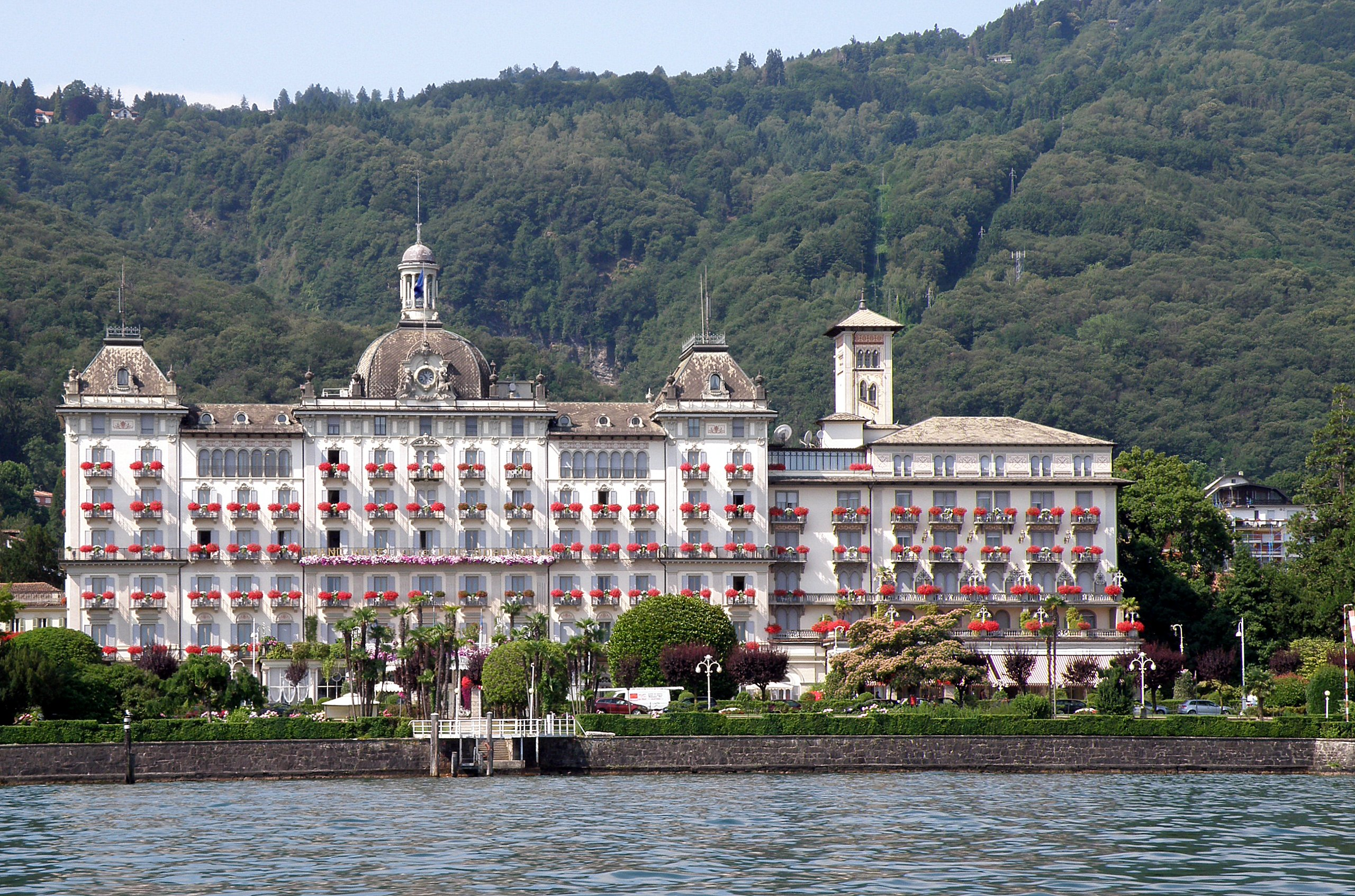
The Grand Hotel des Iles Borromées, which is located in front of the Borromean Islands, hence the name of the hotel, on the shores of Lake Maggiore

In Italy, there is a broad variety of hotels, going from 1-5 stars. According to ISTAT, in 2017, there were 32,988 hotels with 1,133,452 rooms and 2,239,446 beds. As far as extra-hotel facilities (campsites, tourist villages, accommodations for rent, agritourism, etc.) are concerned, in 2017, there are 171,915 with 2,798,352 beds. The tourist flow to coastal resorts is 53 percent; the best equipped cities are Grosseto for farmhouses (217), Vieste for campsites and tourist villages (84) and Cortina d'Ampezzo for mountain huts (20).

The number of hotels, according to their rating, in 2017, went like this:

- 7-star hotels: 2 (the Town House Galleria located in Milan and Aman Canal Grande in Venice).
- 5-star hotels and 4-star hotels: 6,335 with 859,621 beds.
- 3-star hotels: 18,116 with 1,133,452 beds.
- 2-star hotels and 1-star hotels: 8,537 with 246,373 beds.

== See also ==
- Economy of Italy
- ENIT
- Grand Tour
- List of World Heritage Sites in Italy
