= Nuraghe Mannu =

Archaeological site

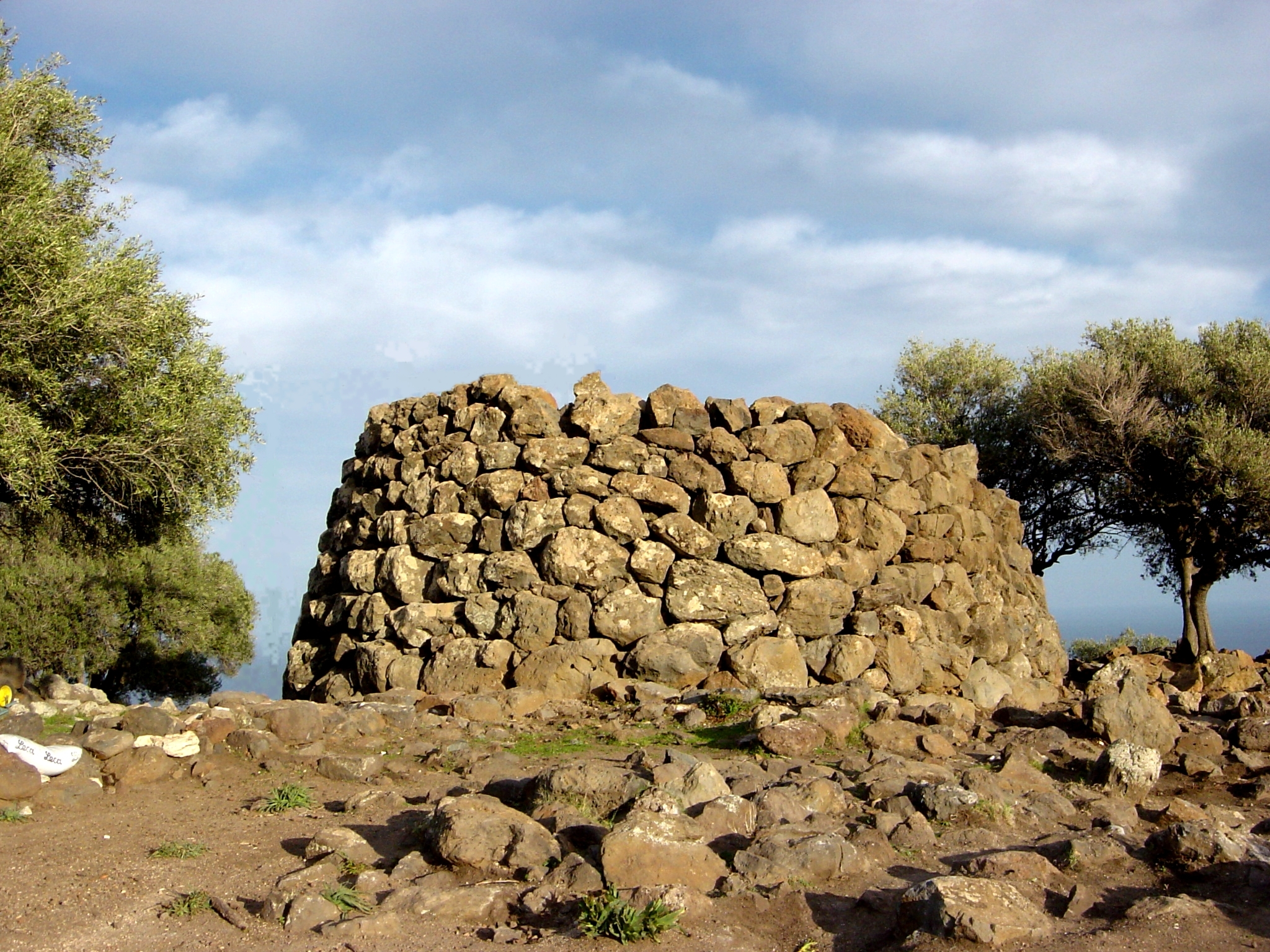
- The Nuraghe

- Map showing location in Sardinia
- 40°15′33.69″N 9°37′12.91″E
- Periods: 17th-15th century B.C.
- Cultures: Nuragic civilization
- Location: Dorgali, Sardinia, Italy

Nuraghe Mannu is a nuragic archaeological site located about 180 metres (590 ft) above sea level overlooking the village of Cala Gonone. It is located on the east coast of Sardinia, in the middle of the gulf of Orosei, province of Nuoro and the municipality of Dorgali. The Nuraghe is partially visible from below and from the coast, from the top it gives a clear view over the surrounding area.

== History ==
Currently the area surrounding the site is the subject of research and archaeological excavations. The first explorer of the area was Antonio Taramelli who in 1927 denounced the damage that the local people did, caused by them using the stones of the monument for the construction of their homes and streets. The scholar discovered the northernmost and the southernmost building dating back to the Roman Period.

== Structure ==
The Nuraghe is a single small tower, is 4.70 meters tall at the highest point and is built with large polyhedral stones of basaltic and trachyte rock. The main facade overlooks the stretch of mountainous coast above the beach of Cala Fuili. The structure of the tower is very modest compared to the great extension of the Nuragic village that lies at its feet. The village consists of various circular huts made of unpolished stones and of rectangular buildings constructed with stones placed on top of each other without any kind of adhesive.

== Function ==
The function of this large and imposing structure is assumed to be a watch tower because the Nuraghe is located next to another larger archaeological site "On Nuragheddu" which apparently had the function of defending the population from attack.

== Finds ==
Brick fragments and Roman pottery were found around the Nuraghe. The youth employment group that works in the territory of Dorgali / Cala Gonone has unearthed fragments of vases and cups dating back to the Nuragic; while other fragments found near the wall, belong to pots and pans.

== Image gallery ==
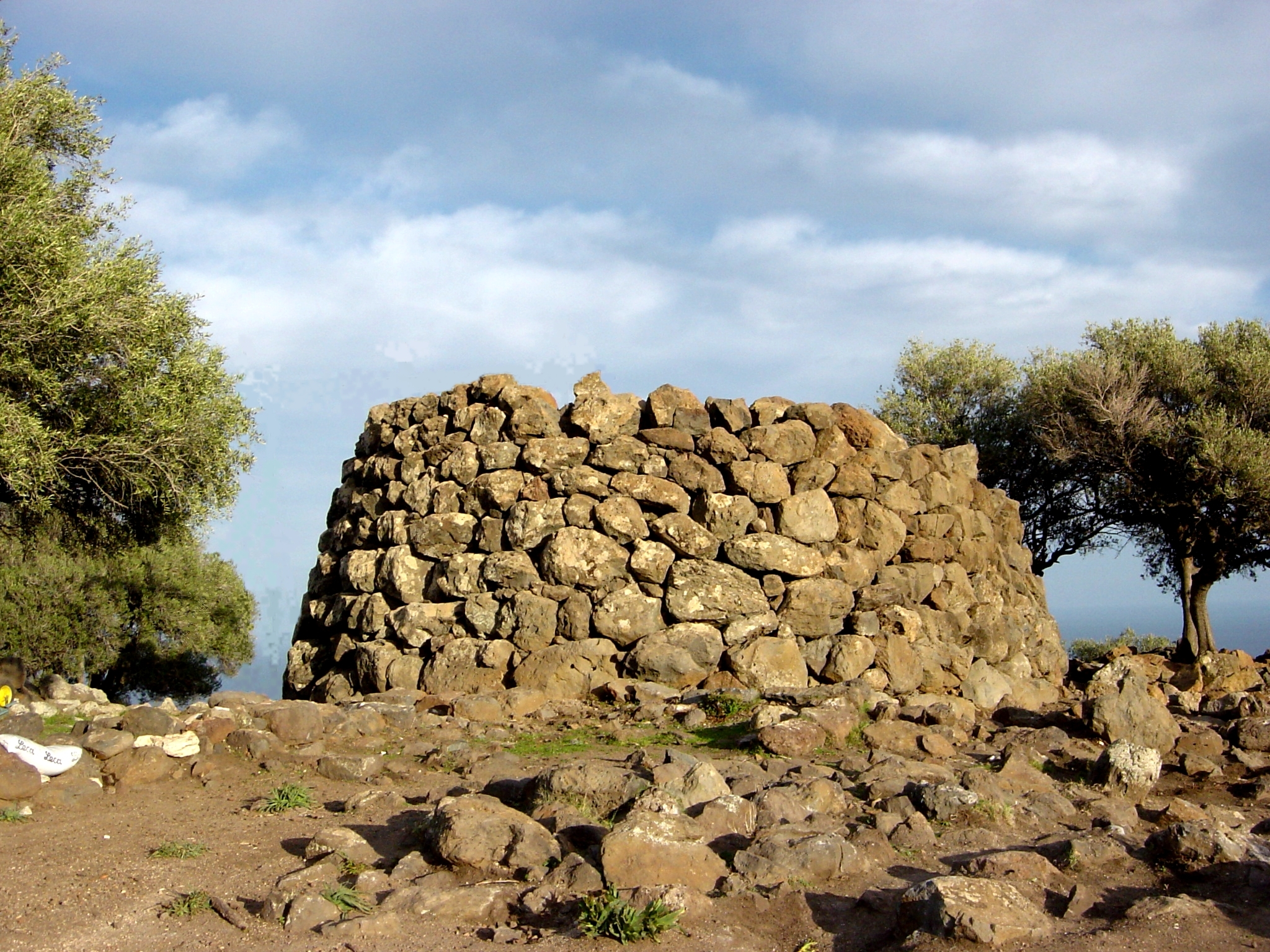
The Nuraghe Mannu

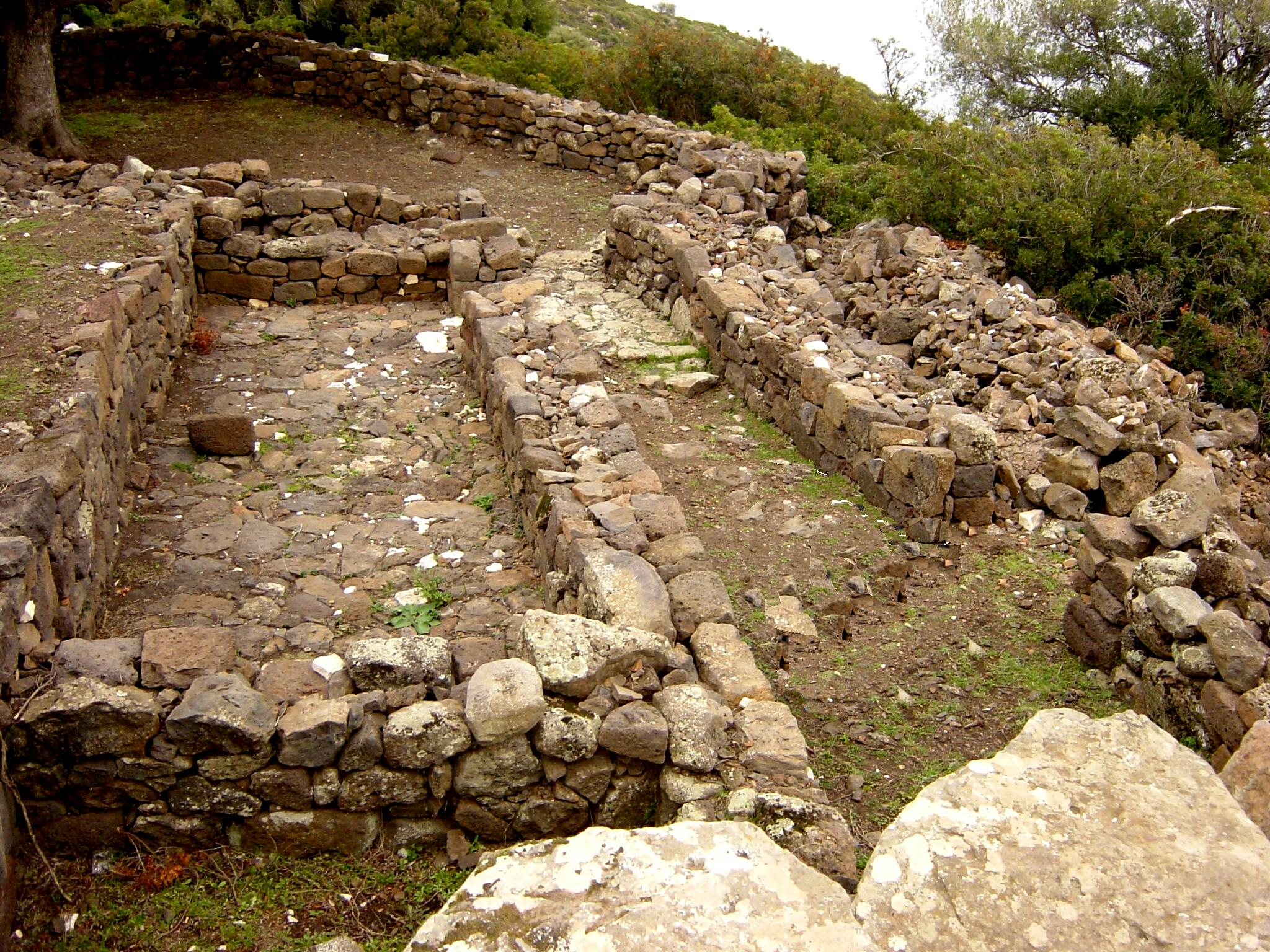
The huts around the Nuraghe

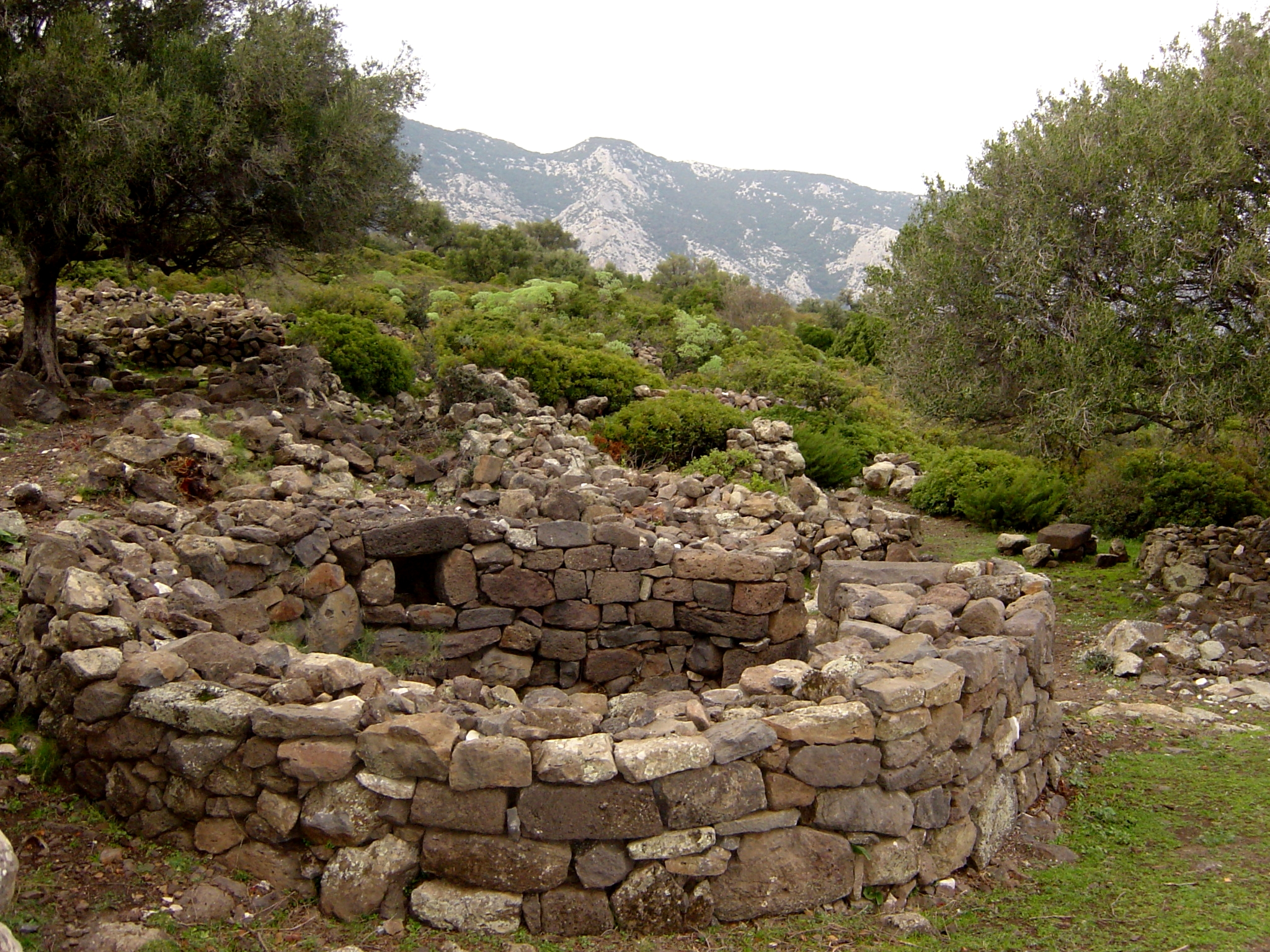
Circular Hut

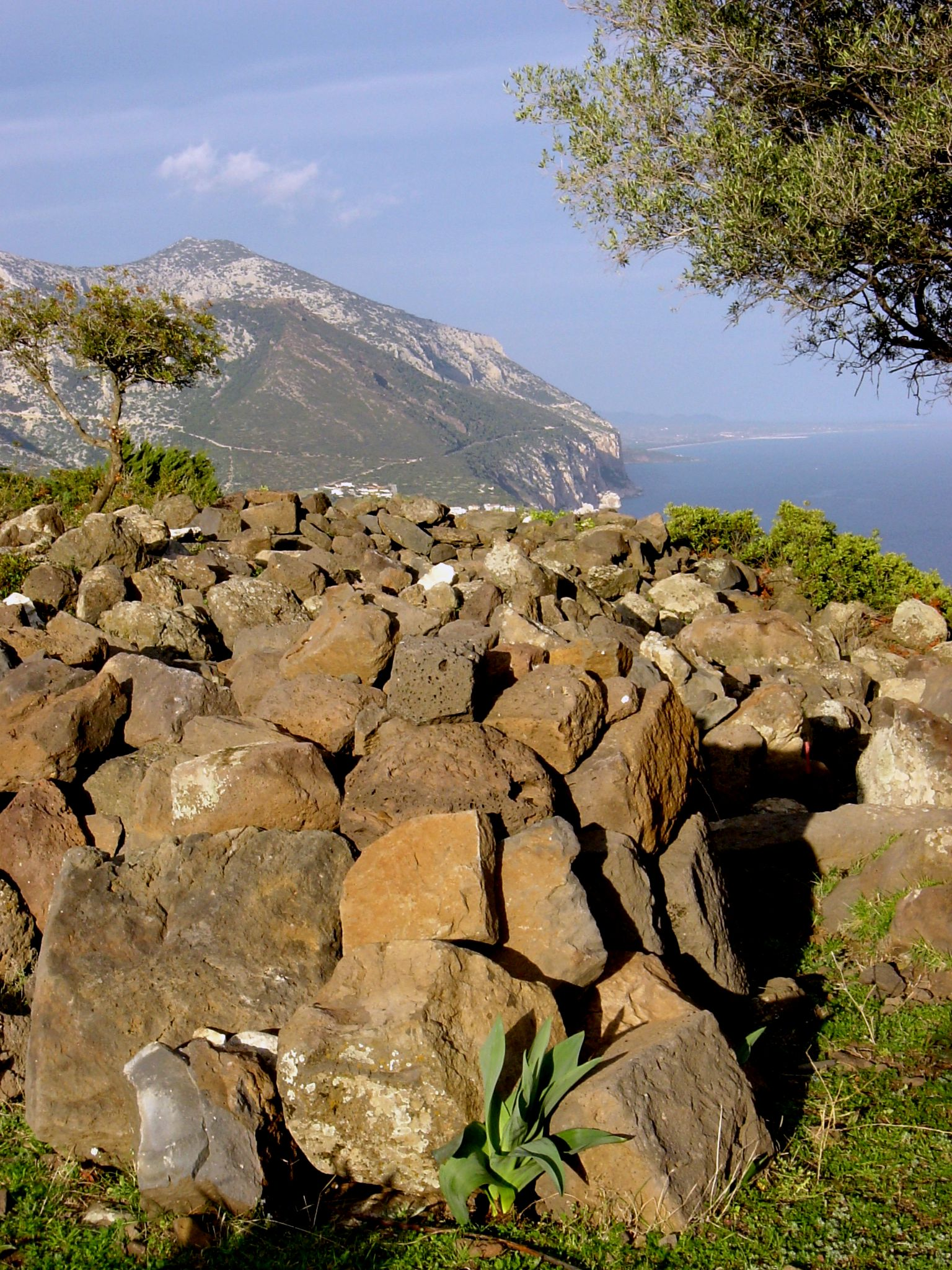
Walls of the village

== Bibliography ==
- Antonio Taramelli, Foglio 208. Dorgali, in the Edizione della Carta Archeologica d'Italia, Florence, Military Geographical Institute, 1929
- Antonio Taramelli, in Notizie degli Scavi, IX, 1933
- M.A. Fadda, Nuraghe Mannu, in Dorgali. Documenti Archeologici, Sassari, Chiarella, 1980, pp. 199–205
- M.A. Fadda, Dorgali (Nuoro). Nuraghe Mannu, in I Sardi. La Sardegna dal paleolitico all'età romana, Milano, Jaca Book, 1984, pp. 216–217
- M.A. Fadda-P. Pruneti, Operazione Nuraghe Mannu, in Archeologia Viva, 48, novembre-dicembre 1994
- M.A. Fadda-S. Massetti, Quattro campagne di scavo con l'Operazione nuraghe Mannu, in Bollettino di Archeologia, 1997, 43-45, pp. 217–221
- Dorgali. Documenti archeologici, Sassari, 1980, Chiarella, p. 109-113, 115-140
