= Cala Gonone =

- Frazione
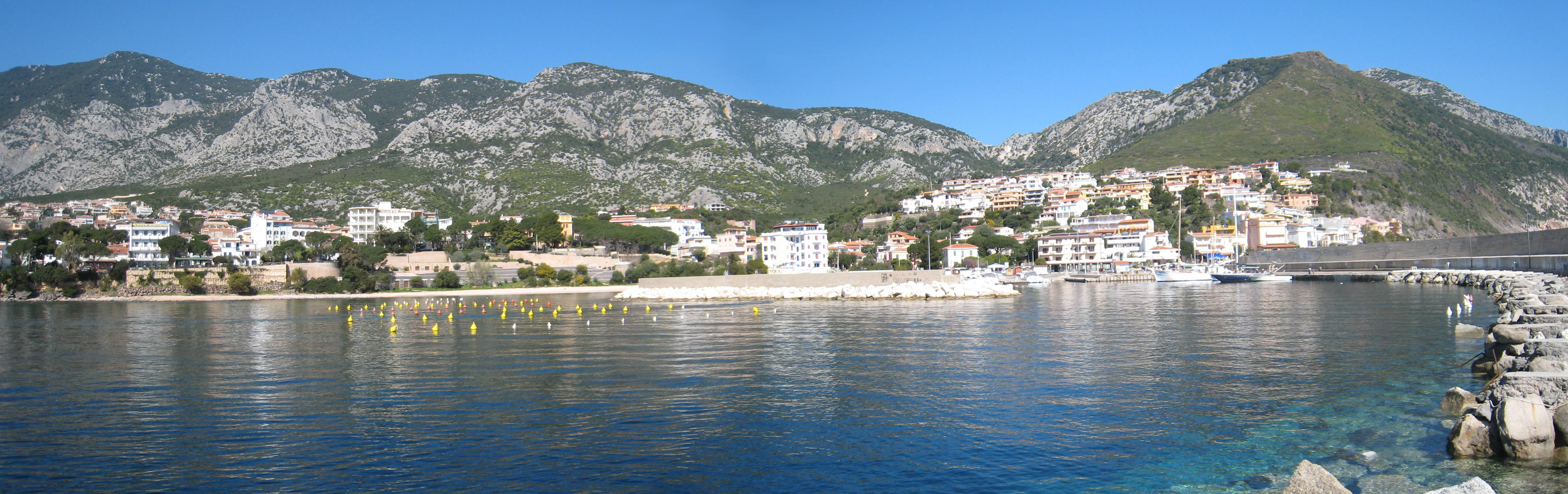
- Cala Gonone from the pier

- Location of Cala Gonone in Italy
- Coordinates: 40°16′57″N 9°37′55″E
- Country: Italy
- Region: Sardinia
- Province: Nuoro (NU)
- Comune: Dorgali
- Elevation: 20 m (66 ft)

Population (2007)
  - Total: 1,278
- Demonym: Gononesi
- Time zone: UTC+1 (CET)
  - Summer (DST): UTC+2 (CEST)
- Postal code: 08020
- Dialing code: (+39) 0784
- Website: Comune of Dorgali

Cala Gonone is an Italian seaside town and a civil parish (frazione) of the municipality (comune) of Dorgali, Province of Nuoro, in the region of Sardinia. In 2007 it had 1,279 inhabitants.

== History ==
The area around Cala Gonone was inhabited in the Nuragic Era. The remains of a Nuragic settlement can be seen at Nuraghe Mannu on the outskirts of the village, just off the road to Dorgali. The modern village was founded by a colony of fishermen from the island of Ponza at the beginning of the 20th century. The town however remained largely isolated from the rest of Sardinia until the tunnel through the hills from Dorgali was opened in 1860.

== Geography ==
The town is situated in the Bay of Orosei on the east of the island and in the geographical region of Supramonte, 9 kilometers from Dorgali, 41 from Nuoro and 108 from Olbia. Close to the village, and reachable by the sea, is the show cave of Bue Marino. Many boats from small speedboats to large tourist boats dock in at the Bue Marino or travel further down the coast to Cala Luna to let the passengers bath in the turquoise water or explore the caves that have been hollowed out by the sea. Almost everyone that goes to the small caves writes their name in charcoal, from a small fire, on the wall, creating a huge mass of writing across several meters of the cave wall.

Due to its natural environment (the territory is included in the Gennargentu National Park) and to the quality of its waters, Cala Gonone is a popular tourist venue. The beaches of the village are: the Spiaggia Centrale (central beach), S'Abba Durche, Cala Luna, Cartoe, Osalla, Cala Fuili, Sos Dorroles, S'Abba Meica, Ziu Martine and Cala Fuili.

== Gallery ==
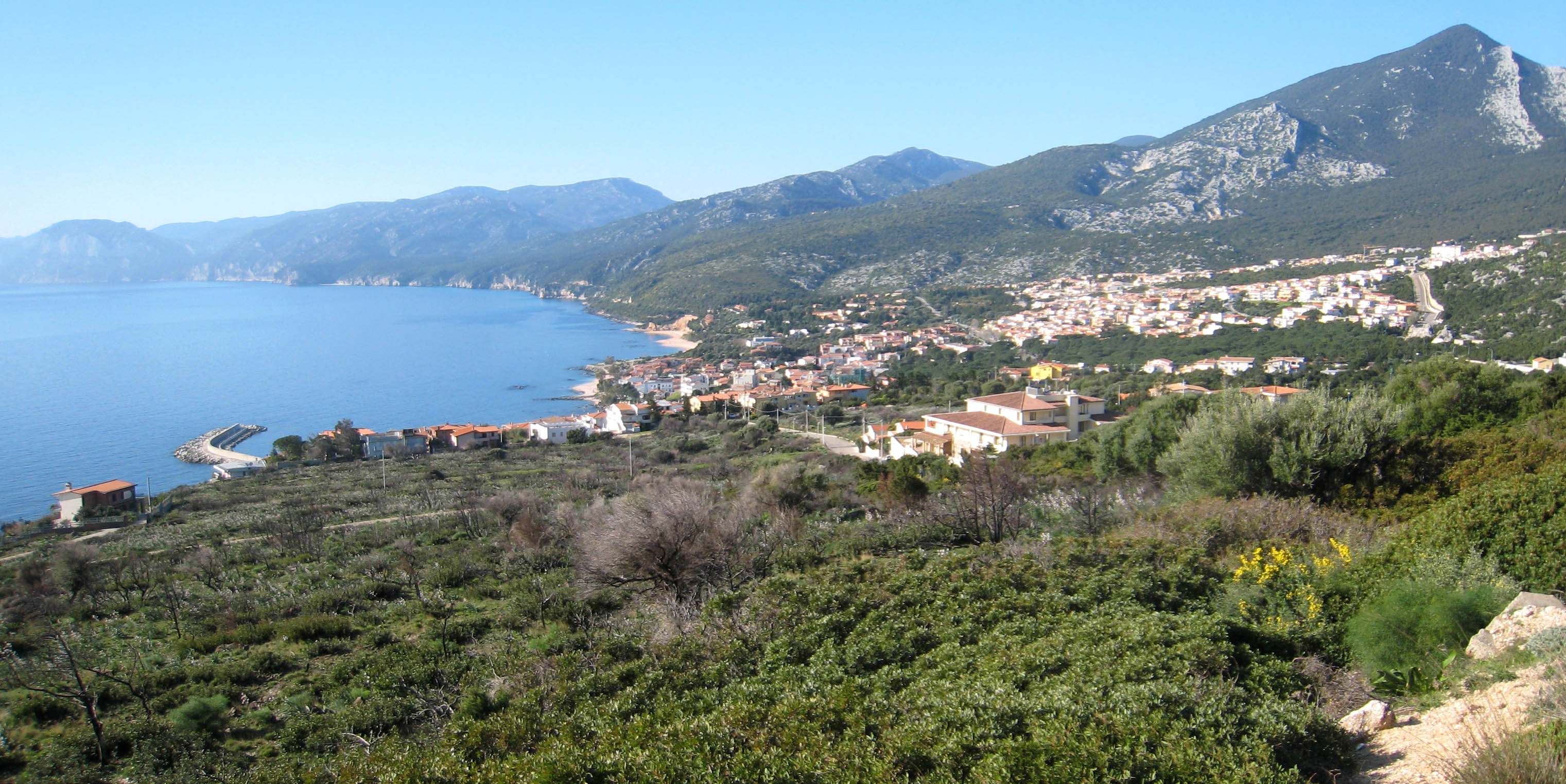
Looking down on Cala Gonone and the Bay of Orosei from the north

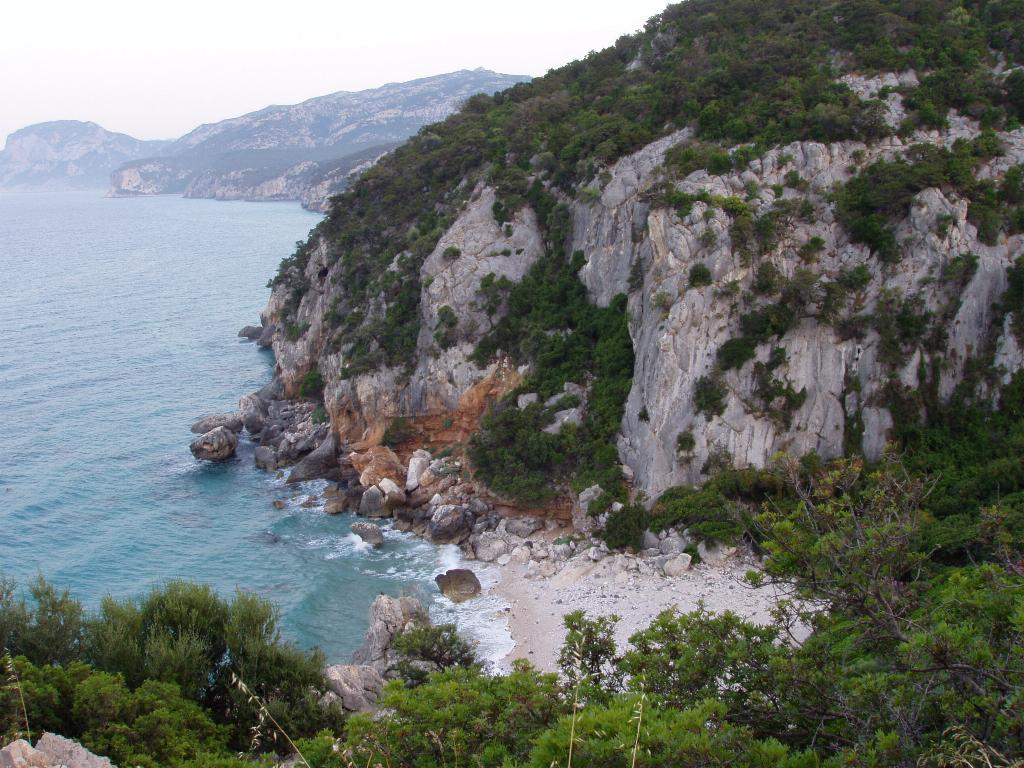
The beach of Cala Fuili

== See also ==
- Bue Marino Grotto
- Ispinigoli Cave
- Supramonte
- Tiscali, situated nearby
