= Motorra Dolmen =

- Dolmen di Motorra
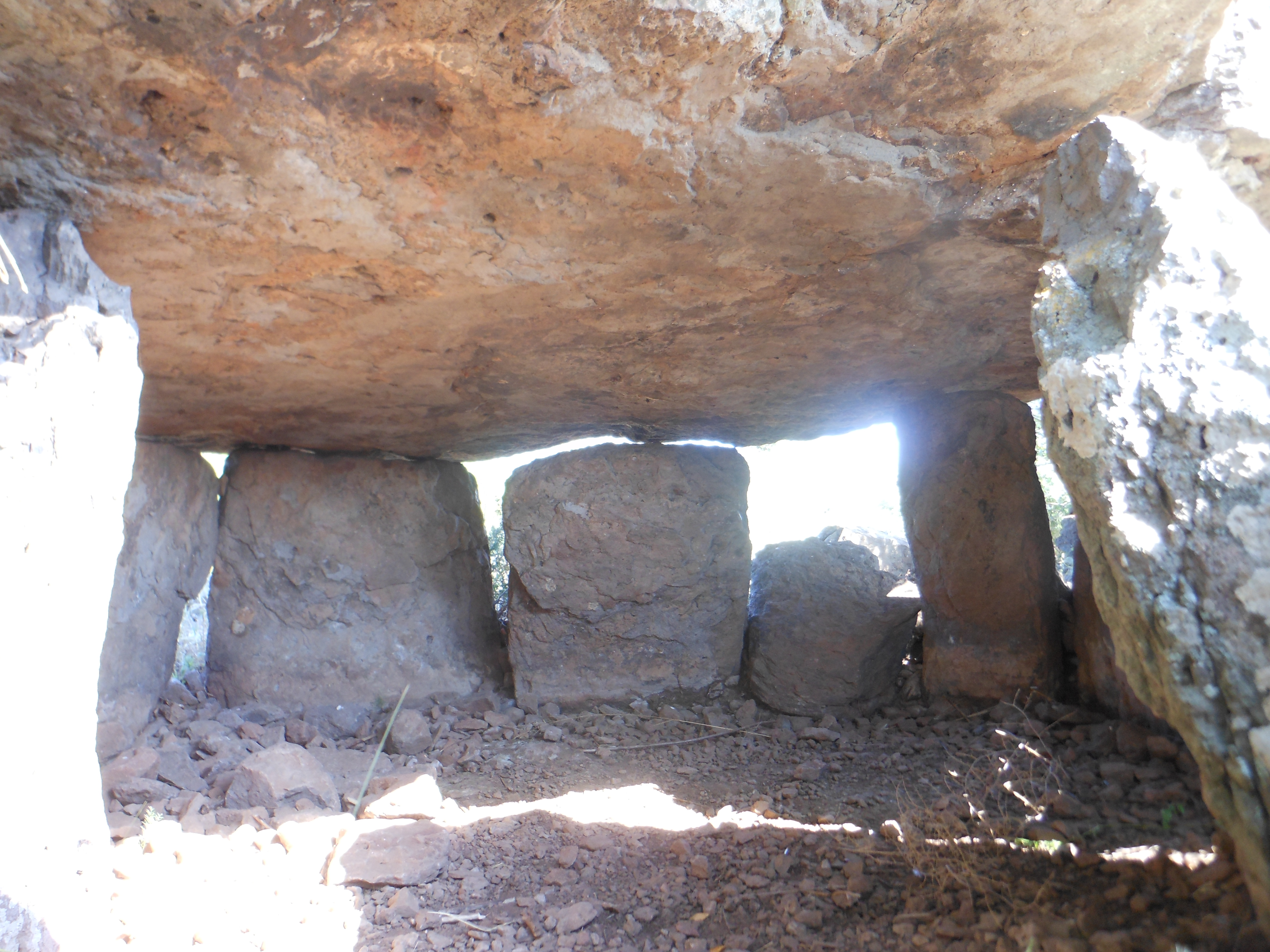
- Interior of the dolmen

- Location within Italy
- 40.306203°N 9.575186°E
- Type: Dolmen
- Periods: Bronze Age
- Location: Sardinia

The Motorra Dolmen (Italian: Dolmen di Motorra) is a Bronze Age tomb or dolmen situated in the comune of Dorgali in the Province of Nuoro, Sardinia, Italy.

== Location ==
The dolmen is situated 8 kilometres (5 miles) to the north of Dorgali on the S125 road towards Orosei. A sign by the side of the road marks the track that leads to the dolmen. A few kilometres away is the Ispinigoli Cave.

== Description ==
The dolmen consists of an entranceway that leads to a polygonal chamber. The eight upright stones of the chamber support an almost circular slab of schist. The dolmen is one of many ancient sites around Dorgali, and is one of the best preserved dolmens in Sardinia. Finds of pottery have linked the dolmen to the Ozieri culture of the Bronze (or Chalcolithic) age, and is dated to around 2800 BC.
