= Giants' grave of S'Ena'e Thomes =

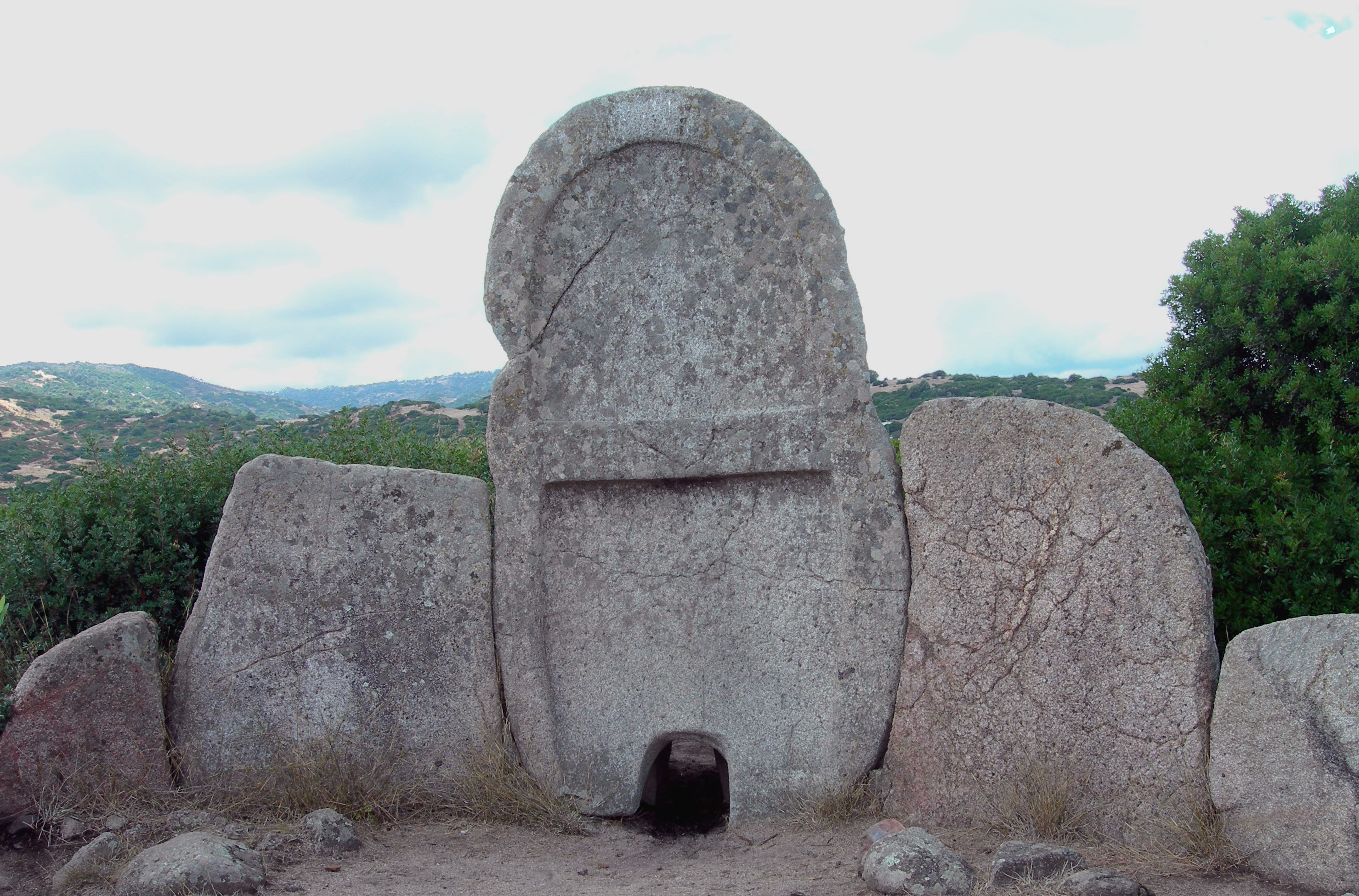
- The dolmen in 2005

- Location in Italy
- 40.3790°N 9.5153°E
- Type: Dolmen
- Location: Nuoro, Italy

History
- Built: c. 1350 BC

Site notes
- Material: Stone
- Length: c. 11 meters

The Giants' grave of S'Ena'e Thomes (known as Tomba dei Giganti di S’ena’e Thomes in Italian) is a Nuragic-era archaeological site located in the municipality of Dorgali, in Nuoro, Italy.

The site’s name, “S’ena’e Thomes,” is derived from Sardinian and translates to Valley of the Tombs.

The tomb, dating back to the Bronze Age (approximately between 1500 and 1200 BC), has a dolmen structure with a central stele. The large exedra is composed of slabs stuck into the ground and sorted by descending size from the stele. The funeral hall, rectangular in shape and about 11 meters length, is covered with large stone slabs arranged in a Jack arch.

Giant's tomb at sa Ena 'e Thomes, Dorgali

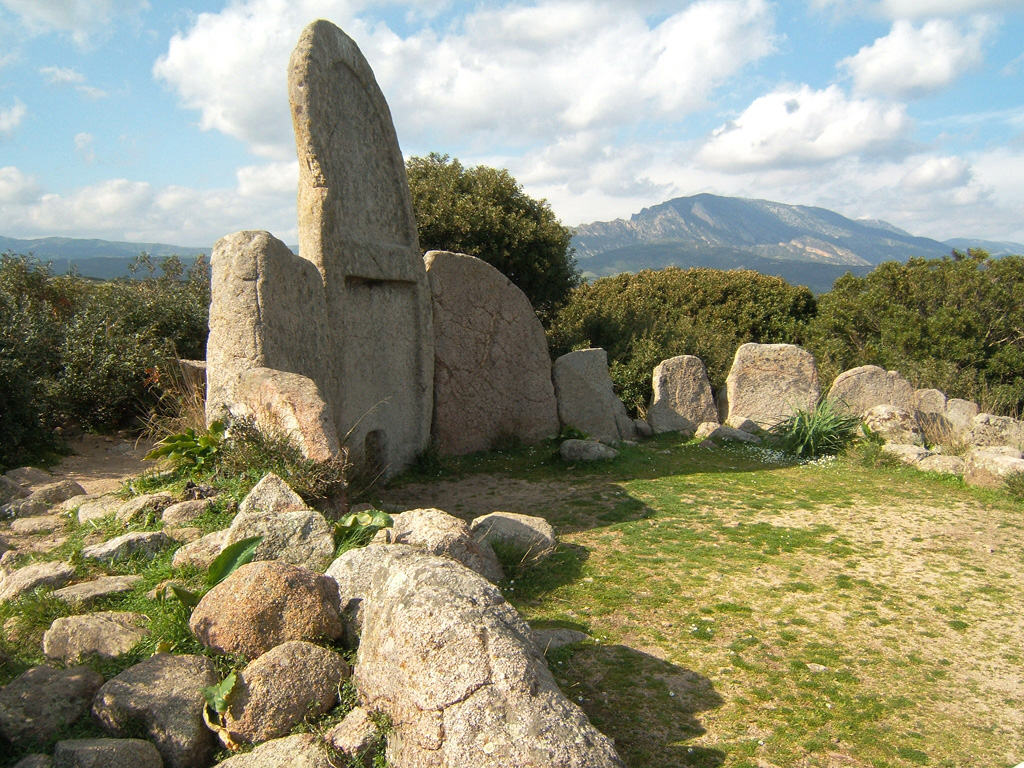
Entrance

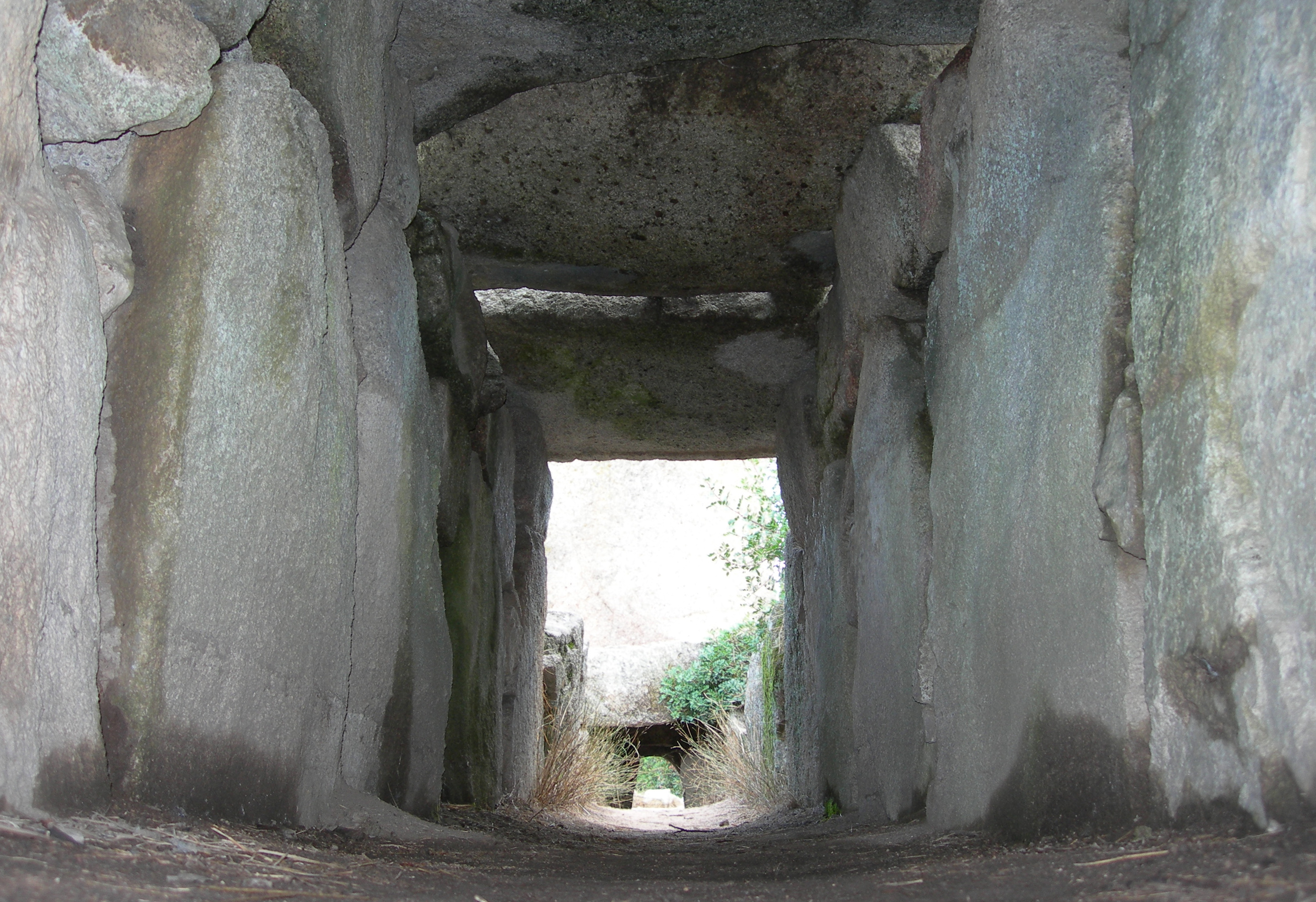
Interior

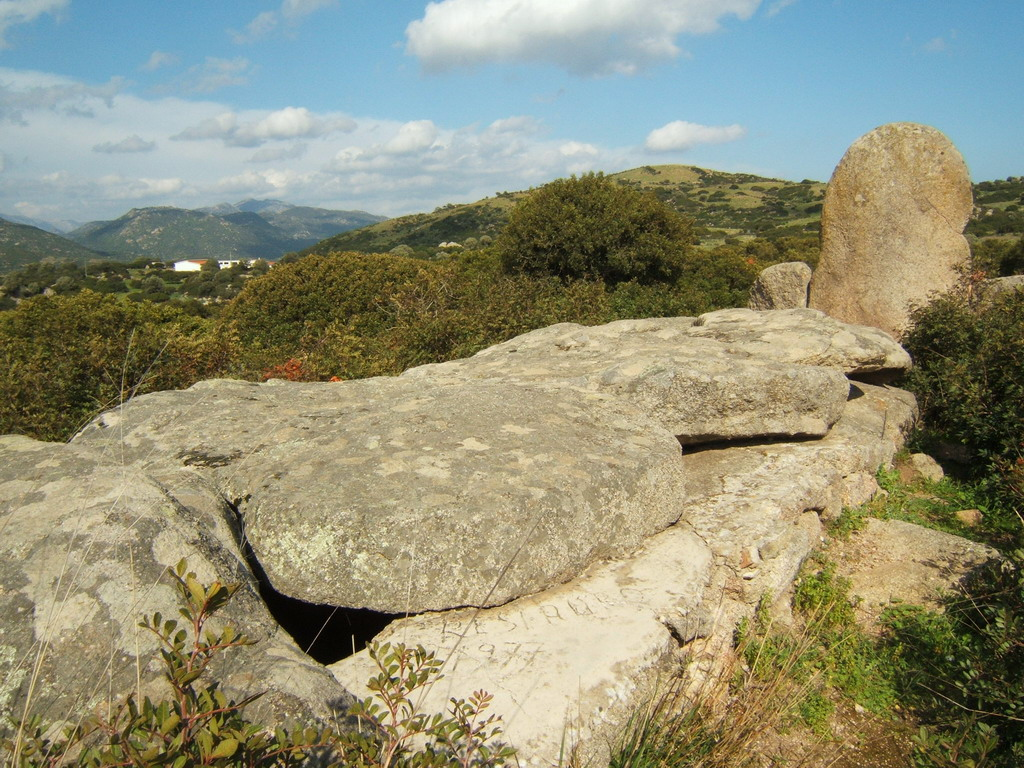
Exterior

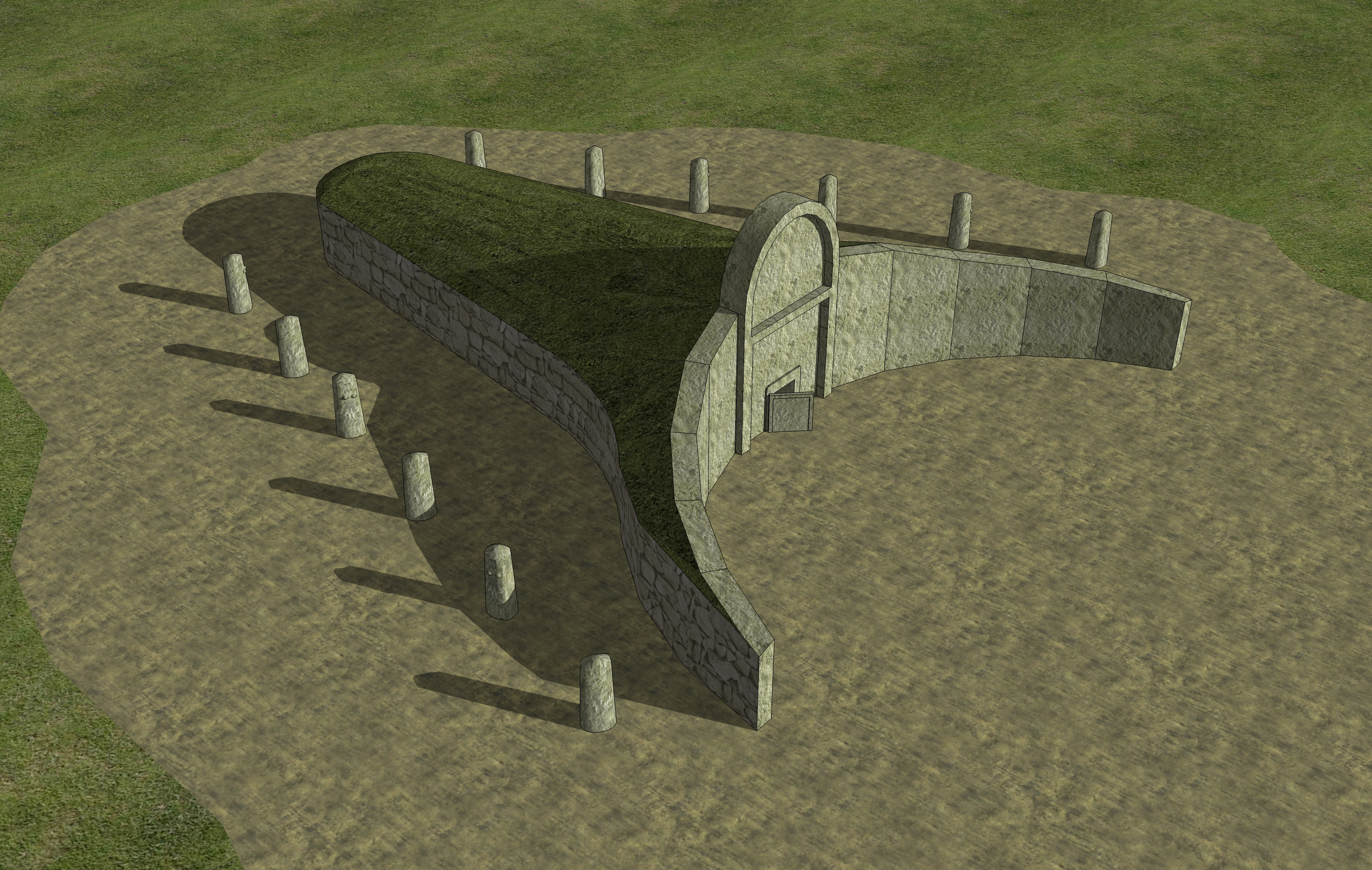
3D model

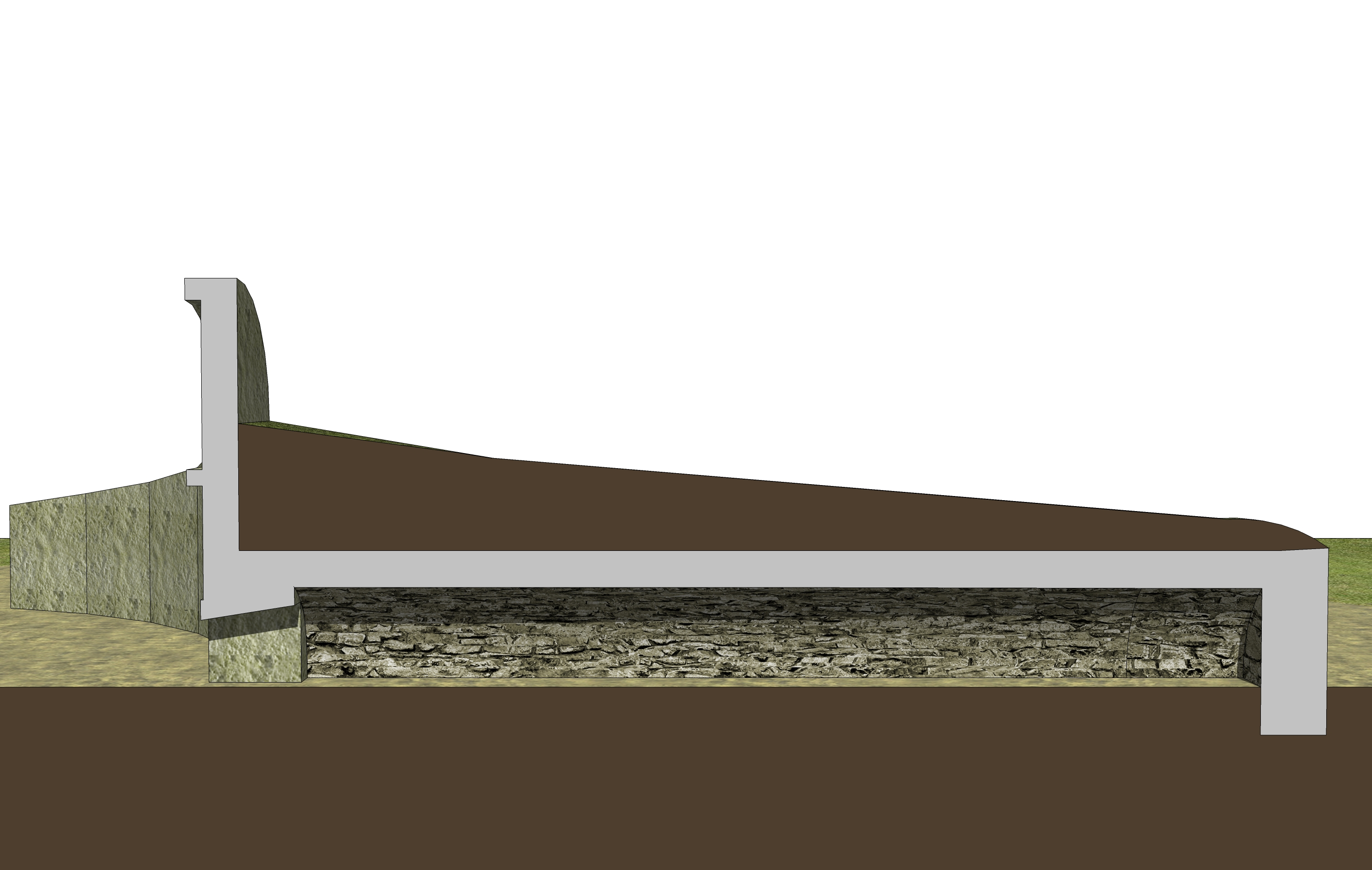
3D model cross-section
