= Nuragic complex of Serra Orrios =

Serra Orrios
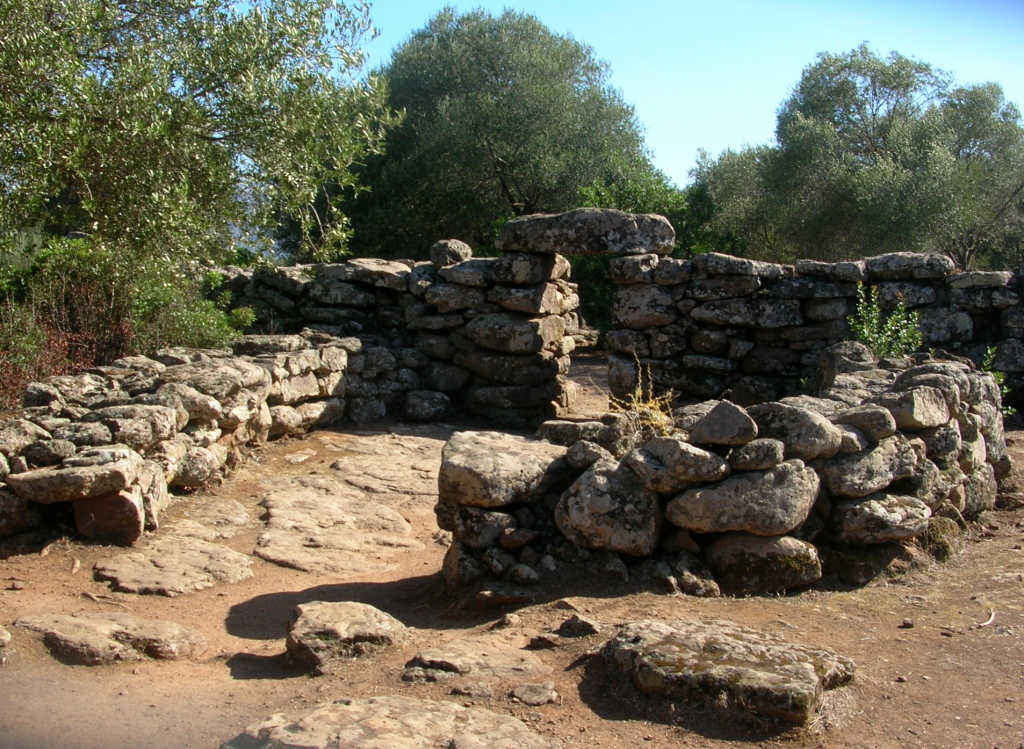
- Interactive map of Serra Orrios
- Type: Village
- Periods: Bronze Age
- Cultures: Nuragic civilization
- Location: Dorgali, Sardinia, Italy

Serra Orrios is an important Nuragic archaeological complex located in the municipality of Dorgali, in the province of Nuoro.

== Description ==
Dating back to the 2nd millennium BC, the site is a sanctuary village and one of the most well-preserved examples in Nuragic Sardinia, consisting of about a hundred circular huts, simples or even complexes and clustered in blocks, and two sacred areas surrounded by sacred fences that separate them from the dwellings, inside which there are two temples of the "Megaron" type.

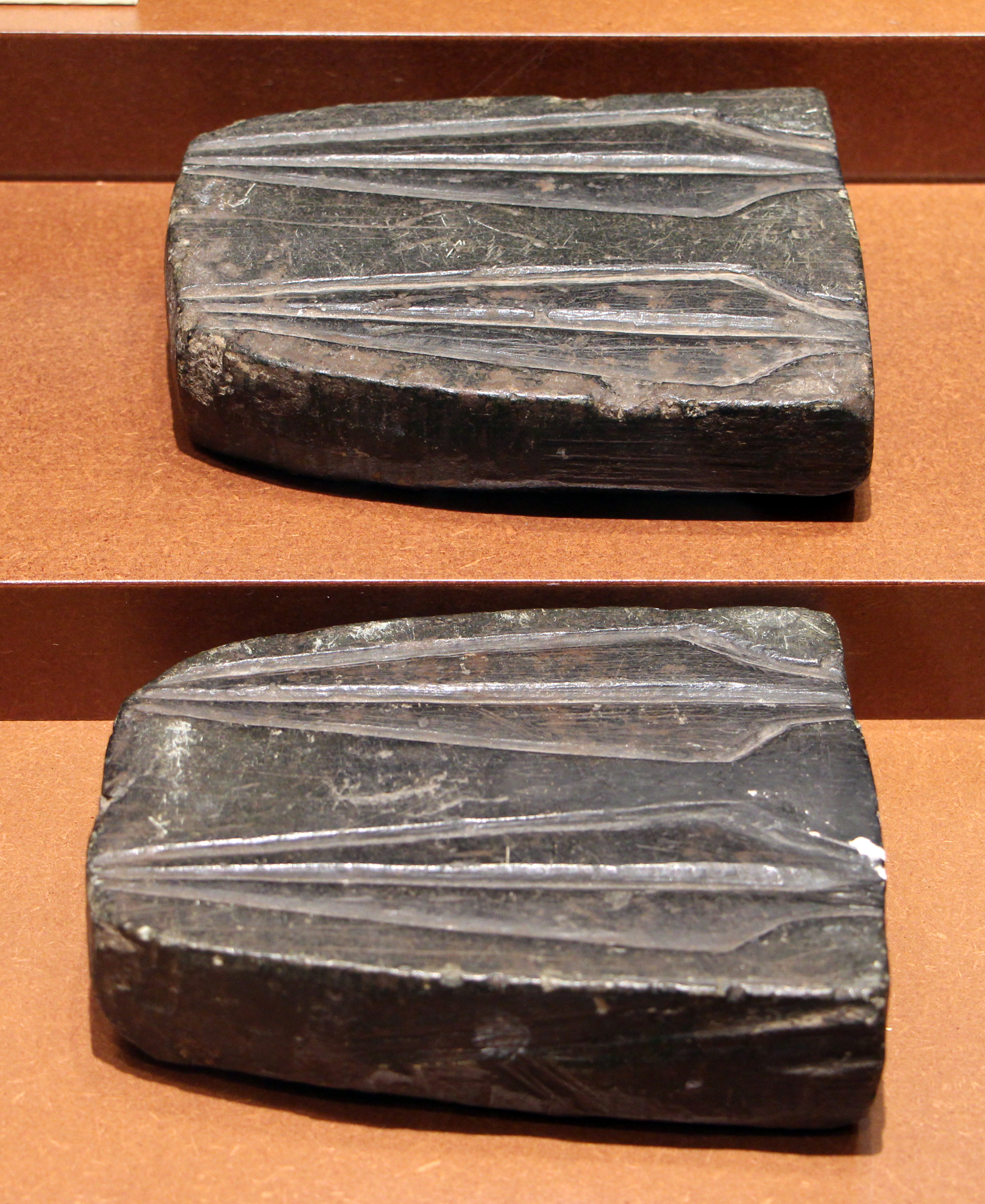
Soapstone casting mold

It was excavated between 1936 and 1938 by Doro Levi. Subsequently, in 1961, the site was restored under the direction of Guglielmo Maetzke.

== Bibliography ==
- Albero Moravetti, Serra Orrios e i monumenti archeologici di Dorgali (PDF), sardegnacultura.it.
