= Dorgali =

Dorgali Durgali (Sardinian)
- Comune
- Comune di Dorgali
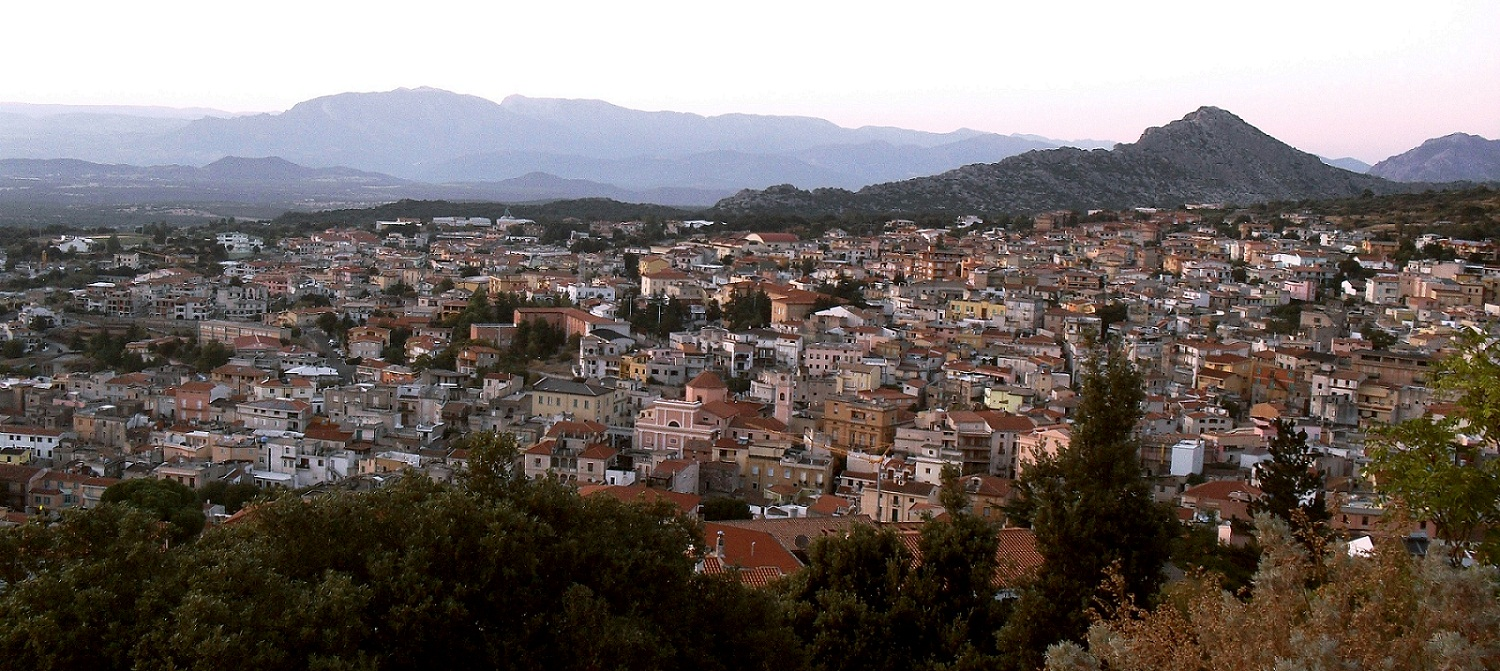
- View of Dorgali

- Coat of arms

- Location within Sardinia
- Coordinates: 40°18′N 9°35′E
- Country: Italy
- Region: Sardinia
- Province: Nuoro (NU)
- Frazioni: Cala Gonone

Government
  - Mayor: Maria Itria Fancello

Area
  - Total: 226.54 km^{2} (87.47 sq mi)
- Elevation: 400 m (1,300 ft)

Population (2026)
  - Total: 8,238
  - Density: 36.36/km^{2} (94.18/sq mi)
- Demonym: Dorgalesi
- Time zone: UTC+1 (CET)
  - Summer (DST): UTC+2 (CEST)
- Postal code: 08022
- Dialing code: 0784
- Patron saint: St. Catherine of Alexandria
- Saint day: November 25
- Website: Official website

Dorgali (Sardinian: Durgali) is a town and comune (municipality) in the Province of Nuoro in the autonomous island region of Sardinia in Italy, located about 230 kilometres (140 mi) northeast of Cagliari and about 38 kilometres (24 mi) east of Nuoro in the seaside Supramonte mountain area. It has 8,238 inhabitants.

Economy is mostly based on the vine and wine production and, in summertime, on tourism.

In one of the caves, Ispinigoli, the only known specimen of the extinct giant otter Megalenhydris was found.

It is the birthplace of blessed Maria Gabriella Sagheddu.

== Demographics ==
As of 2026, the population is 8,238, of which 50.0% are male, and 50.0% are female. Minors make up 14.8% of the population, and seniors make up 24.9%.

Historical population

Year	Pop.	±%
1861	3,912	—
1871	4,044	+3.4%
1881	4,373	+8.1%
1901	5,220	+19.4%
1911	5,584	+7.0%
1921	5,596	+0.2%
1931	6,051	+8.1%
1936	6,140	+1.5%

Year	Pop.	±%
1951	6,721	+9.5%
1961	7,189	+7.0%
1971	7,074	−1.6%
1981	7,595	+7.4%
1991	8,035	+5.8%
2001	8,190	+1.9%
2011	8,524	+4.1%
2021	8,368	−1.8%

Source: ISTAT

=== Immigration ===
As of 2025, immigrants make up 5.3% of the population. The 5 largest foreign countries of birth are Germany, France, Romania, Belgium, and Switzerland.

== Main sights ==
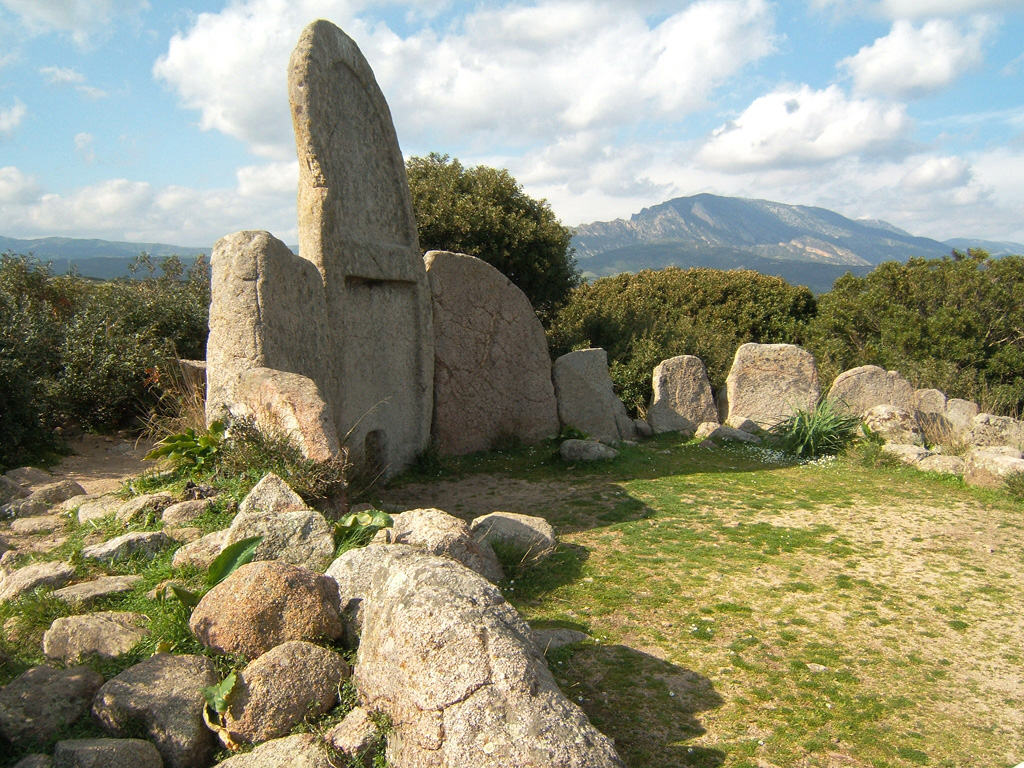
Giants' grave of S'Ena'e Thomes

Grotta Bue Marino

- Nuraghe villages of Tiscali and Serra Orrios
- Other prehistoric nuraghes, dolmens, menhirs and Domus de janas
- Giants' grave of S'Ena'e Thomes
- Motorra Dolmen
- Beach of Cala Gonone
- Grotta del Bue Marino
- Ispinigoli Cave
- Tiscali Cave
