= Grotta di Ispinigoli =

Grotta di Ispinigoli (Ispinigoli Cave)
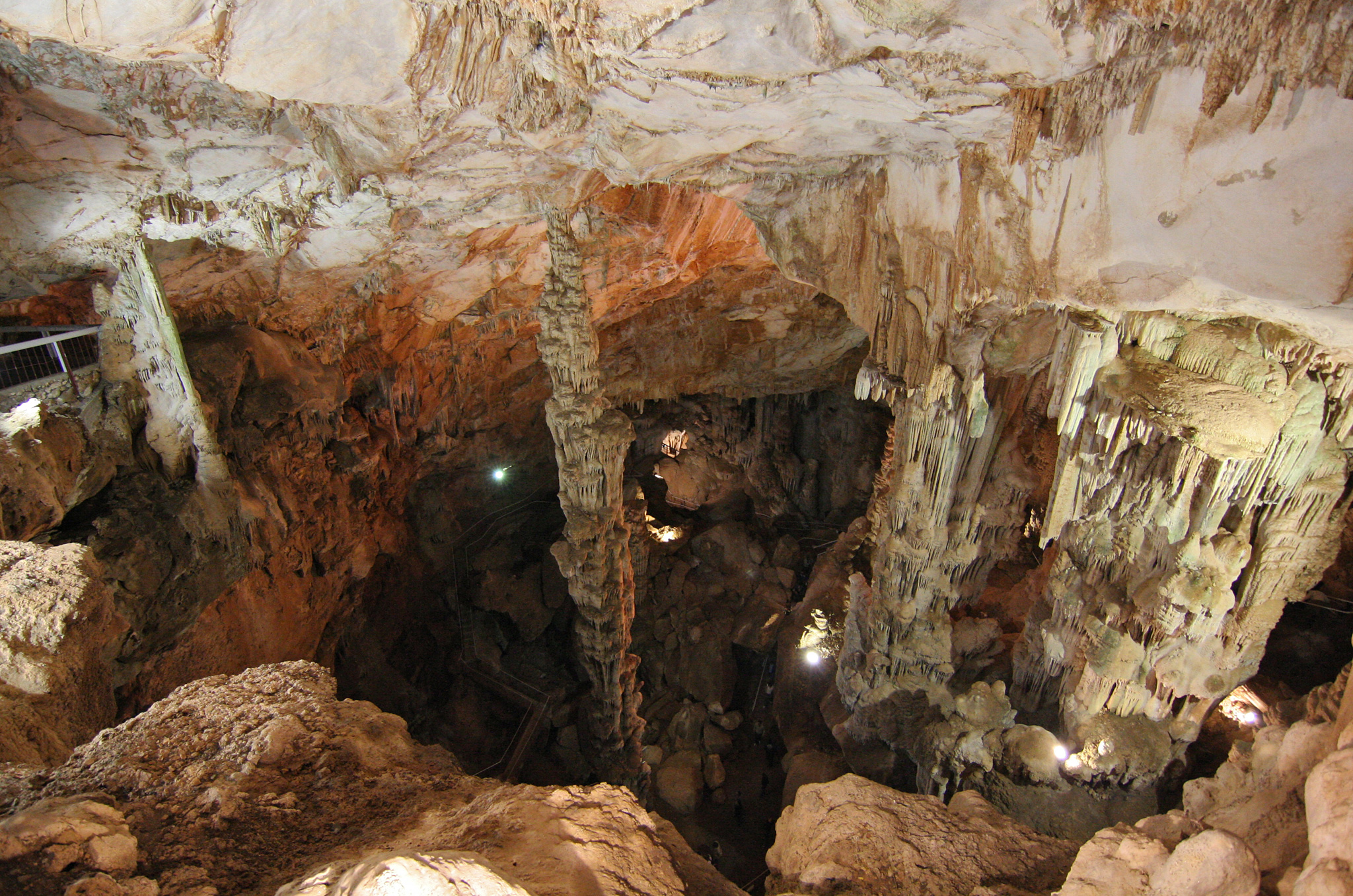
- View of the cave

- Location within Italy
- Location: Ispinigoli, Dorgali (NU, Sardinia, Italy)
- Coordinates: 40°19′12″N 9°36′1.2″E
- Depth: 35 m
- Elevation: 1,300 m
- Discovery: 1971
- Geology: Karst cave
- Entrances: 1
- Access: Public
- Show cave opened: 1974
- Website: Grotta di Ispinigoli

The Grotta di Ispinigoli is a karst cave in the Supramonte range, near Dorgali, Sardinia, Italy.

== Overview ==
One of the largest caves on the island, it contains the tallest column, the tallest in Europe and one of the tallest in the world, measuring circa 38 m in total. The cave also includes the so-called Abisso delle Vergini ("Abyss of the Virgins"), a c. 60 m-deep hole leading to a 12 km series of caves connecting Ispingoli to San Giovanni su Anzu cave. Inside the cave were found traces of human bones and jewelry dating back the Bronze Age, the site was used as burial place by the Nuragic people.

At the bottom of the abyss, were found traces of the extinct giant otter Megalenhydris. This animal is one of four species of extinct endemic otters on the island.

== See also ==
- Bue Marino Grotto
- Tiscali Cave
- List of caves
- List of caves in Italy
