= Cala Fuili =

Beach in Sardinia, Italy

Coordinates: 40°15′22″N 9°37′30″E

Cala Fuili is a beach located south along the coast from Cala Gonone, Sardinia.
