= Tiscali (village) =

Archaeological site situated in Sardinia

Coordinates: 40°14′12.31″N 9°29′21.9″E

Tiscali (Tiscali Village)
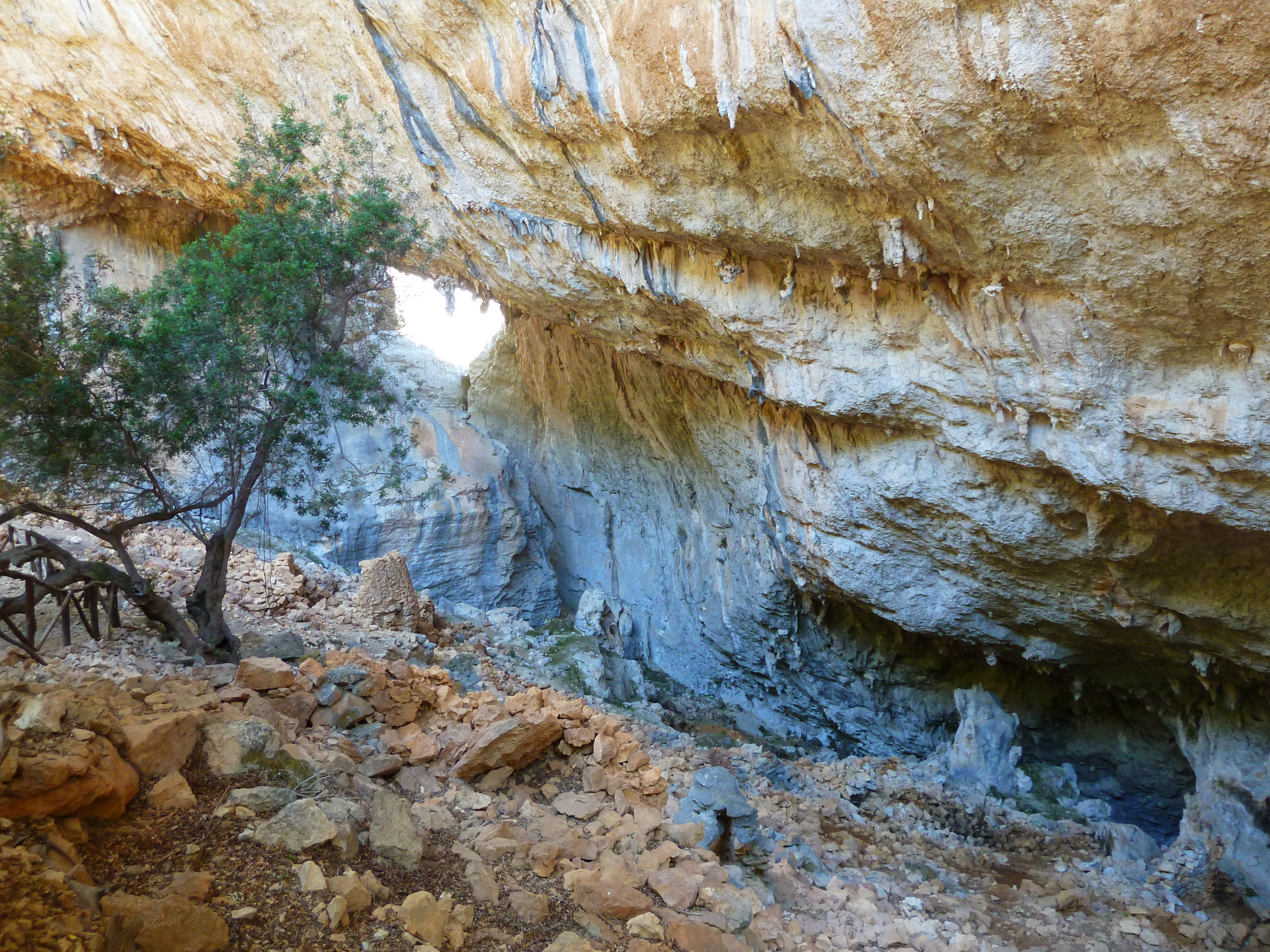
- Inside of the cave at Tiscali

- Location within Sardinia
- Type: Settlement
- Cultures: Nuragic civilization

Site notes
- Excavation dates: 1910; 1927; 2000-
- Condition: ruined
- Management: I Beni Culturali della Sardegna
- Public access: yes
- Website: Dorgali, villaggio di Tiscali (in Italian)

Tiscali Village is an archaeological site situated in Sardinia, in the comune of Dorgali.

It is situated within a large cave in Monte Tiscali. It consists of the remains of a number of round dwellings dating from the first millennium BC.

The site was re-discovered a little over a century ago and was first documented by the Italian historian Ettore Pais in 1910 and later in greater detail by Antonio Taramelli in 1927. There was a short excavation campaign in 2000 by the Soprintendenza per i Beni Archeologici per le Provincie di Sassari e Nuoro.

Telecommunications company Tiscali took its name from the site.

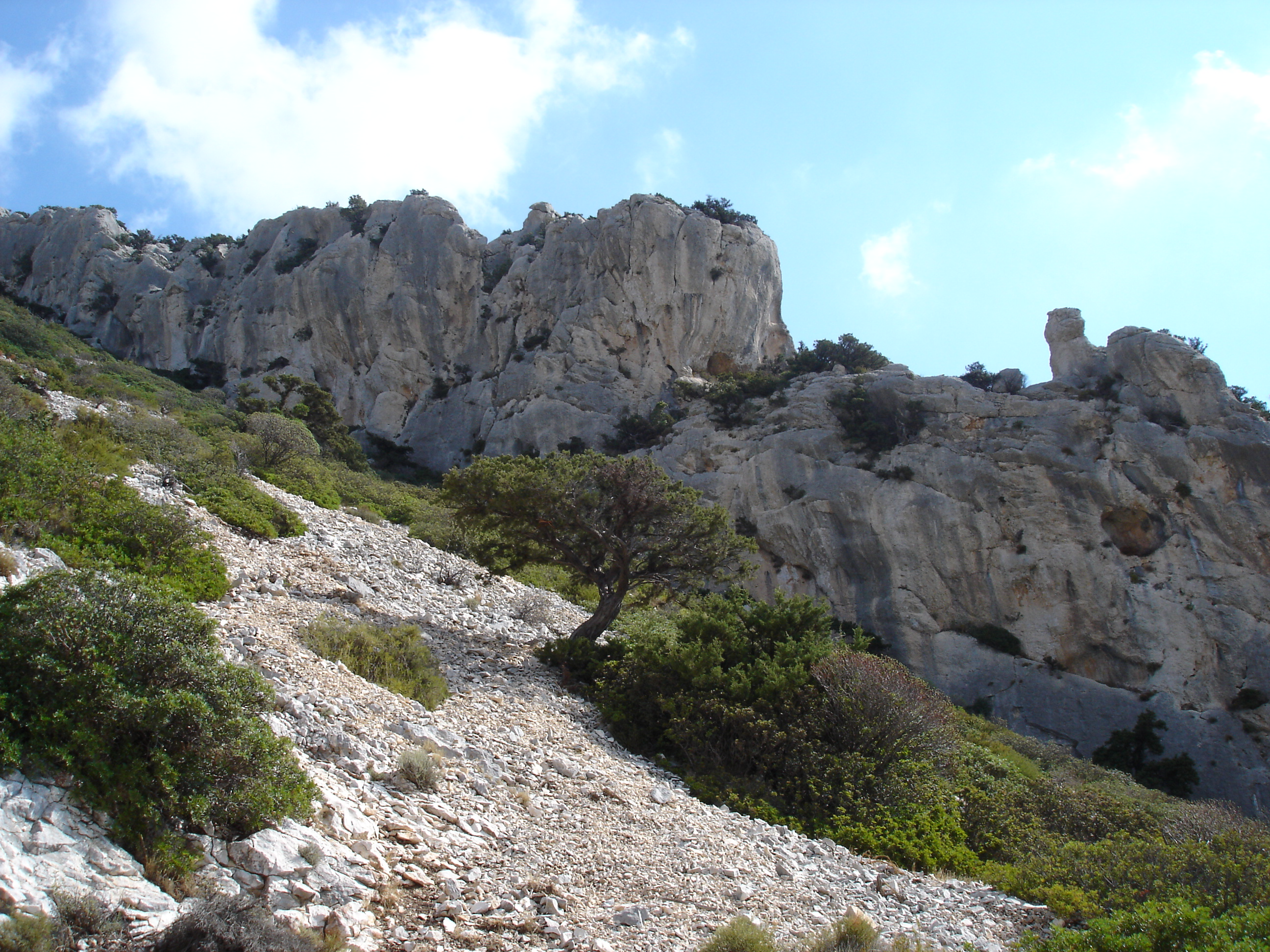
View of Monte di Tiscali.
